= Idaho State Forester's Building =

U.S. historic building

- U.S. National Register of Historic Places
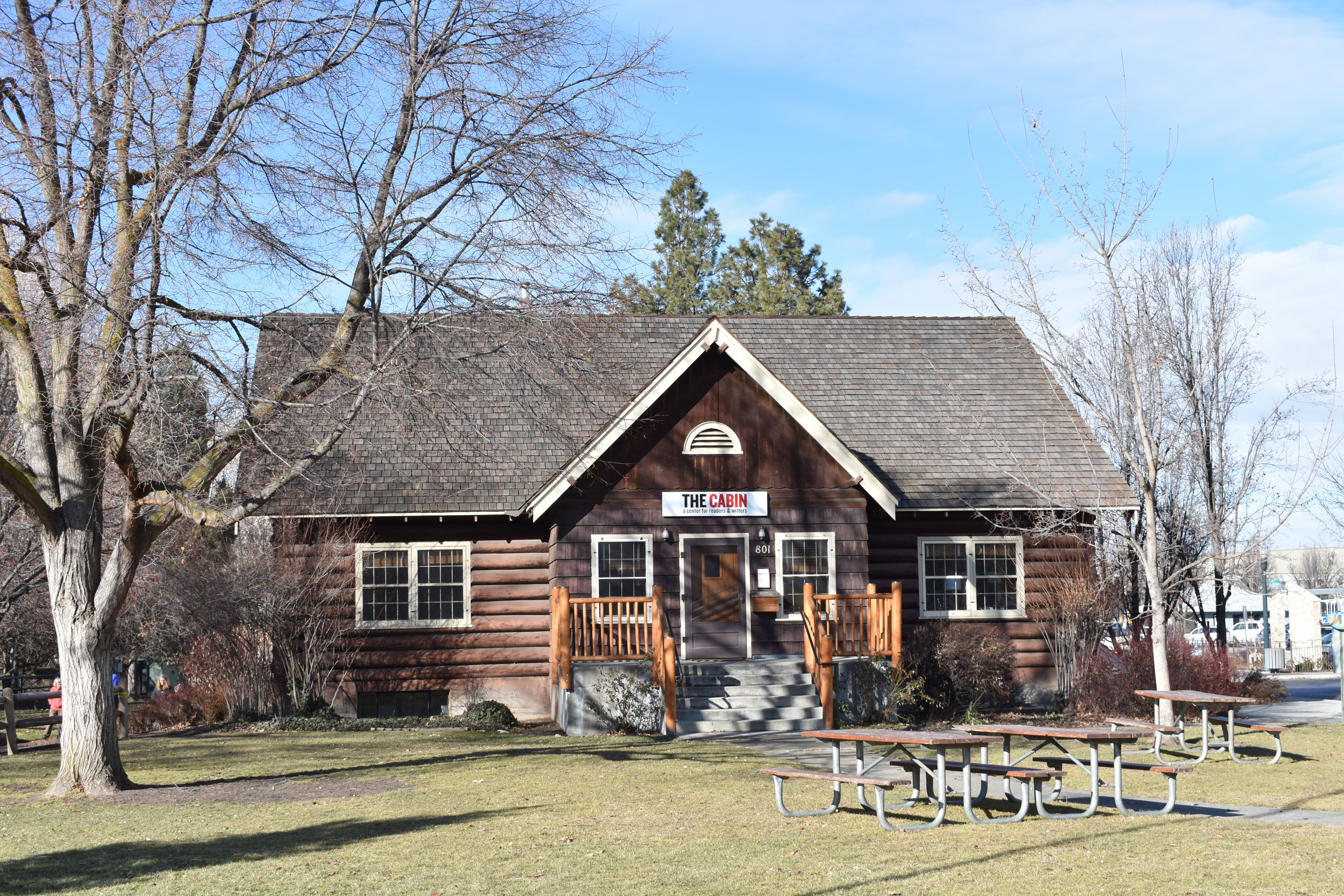
- The Idaho State Forester's Building in 2019

- Location within Idaho Location within the United States
- Location: 801 S. Capitol Blvd., Boise, Idaho
- Coordinates: 43°36′35″N 116°12′27″W
- Area: 1 acre (0.40 ha)
- Built: 1940
- Built by: John Heillila; Gust Lapinoja
- Architect: Hulbe, Hans C.
- Architectural style: Log cabin
- NRHP reference No.: 96001591
- Added to NRHP: January 16, 1997

The Idaho State Forester's Building, also known as The Cabin, in Boise, Idaho, is a 1 1/2-story log cabin designed by Boise Payette Lumber Company architect Hans C. Hulbe and constructed in 1940 by round-log artists John Heillila and Gust Lapinoja. Logs for the cabin are peeled Engelmann spruce with full dovetail notch and oakum chinking. Inside paneling on office walls includes yellow pine, white pine, and western red cedar, and all of the wood came from Idaho forests and was donated by lumber companies with business interests in Idaho. The building was added to the National Register of Historic Places in 1997.

== History ==
In 1907 legislators in Idaho began to consider creation of a state forester who would be responsible for public safety and policy enforcement in Idaho's forests. Legislation again was considered in 1921 and in 1924, and finally in 1925 the legislature approved a bill establishing the position of state forester. Ben E. Bush, an agent of the state land board, became the first state forester in Idaho, and he served until 1933. Bush was also the brother in law of Senator Borah.

Although the state forester's office had been established in Coeur d'Alene, a second office was opened in 1935 in the Capitol Building in Boise. The Capitol office was open only while the legislature was not in session, and when Franklin Girard became state forester, his Boise office moved eight times in three years. As a result of frequent relocations, Girard established the Idaho State Forester's Building in 1940.

The cabin required 44 logs, each 55 feet long and one-foot diameter, and after the logs were cut and set, the cabin walls were given time to cure to prevent warping. Most of the materials were donated, and the Civilian Conservation Corps provided most of the labor.

The cabin was occupied in 1940 by the state forester's office, later the State Forestry Department, and it provided office space for the Soil Conservation Corps until 1990, when the building was acquired by the City of Boise.

A lease agreement with the city allowed the Log Cabin Literacy Center, later known as The Cabin, to hold meetings at the building in 1995 until the present.

== Boise Public Library Expansion ==
In 1973 the main library of the Boise Public Library system renovated and occupied the Salt Lake Hardware Company warehouse adjacent to the Idaho State Forester's Building. In 2018 a proposed expansion of the main library included a plan either to demolish or to move The Cabin. In November, 2018, the Boise city council voted to move The Cabin to Julia Davis Park to allow room for expansion of the library.
