= Boise, Idaho =

Capital of Idaho, U.S.

Boise
- State capital city
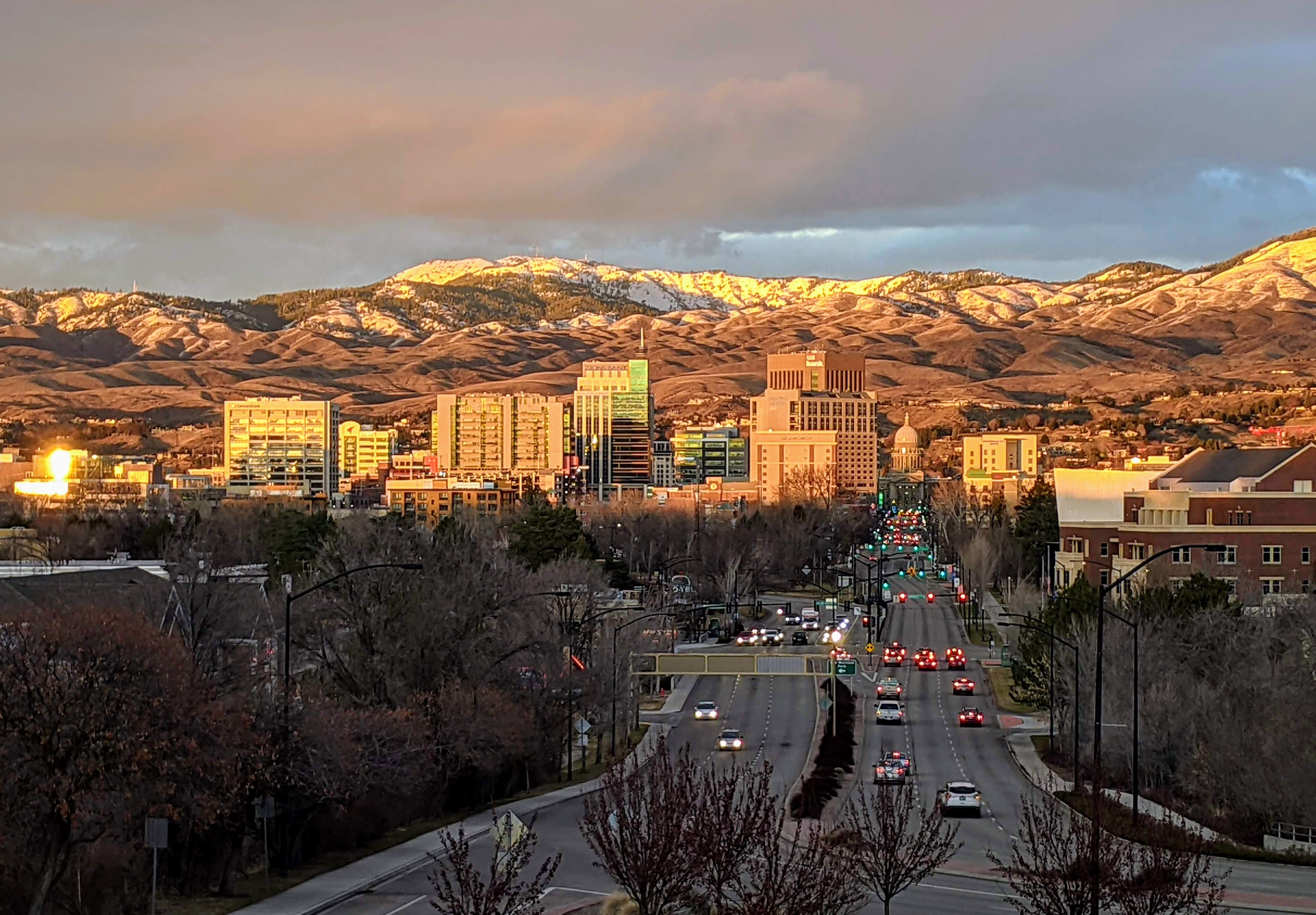
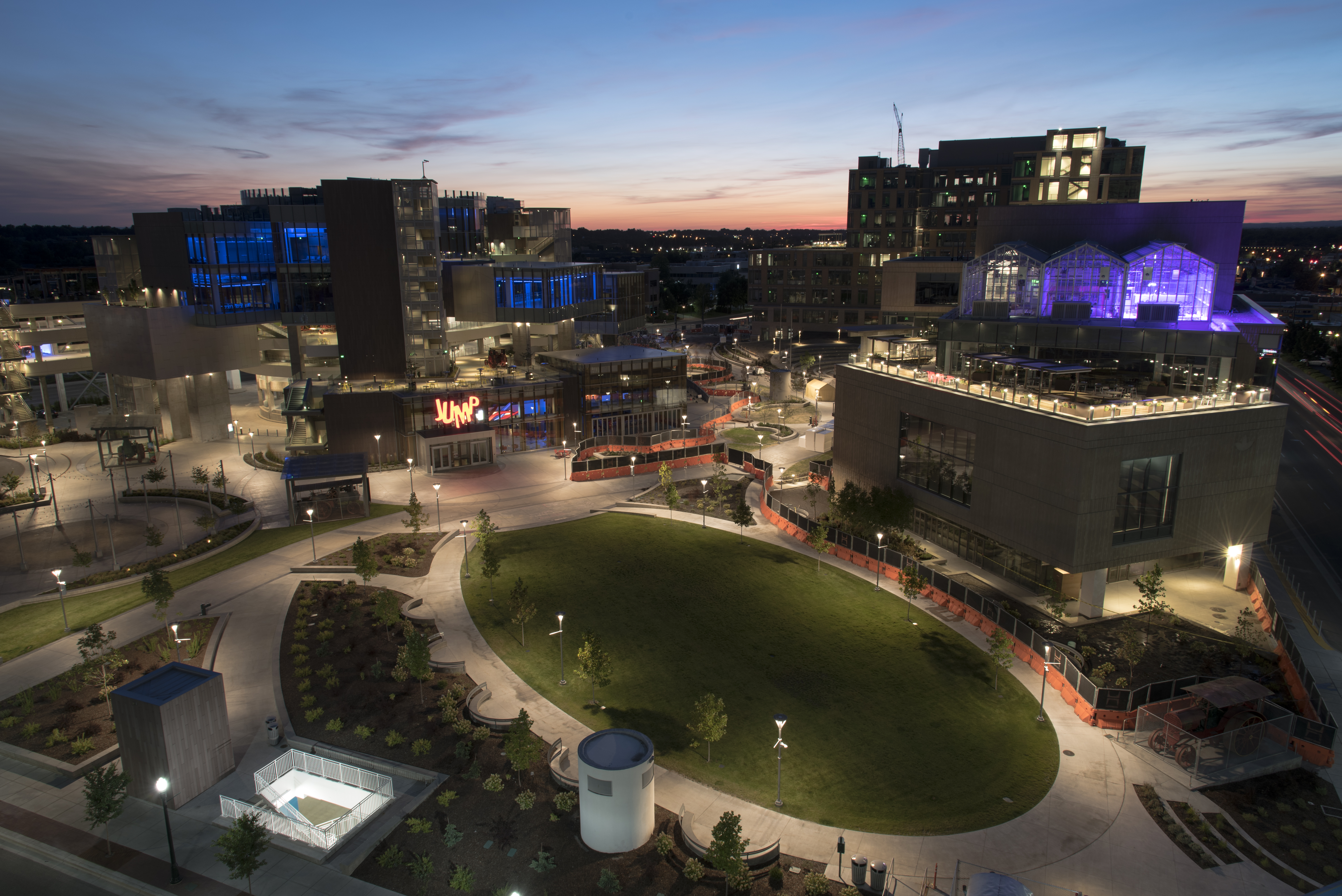
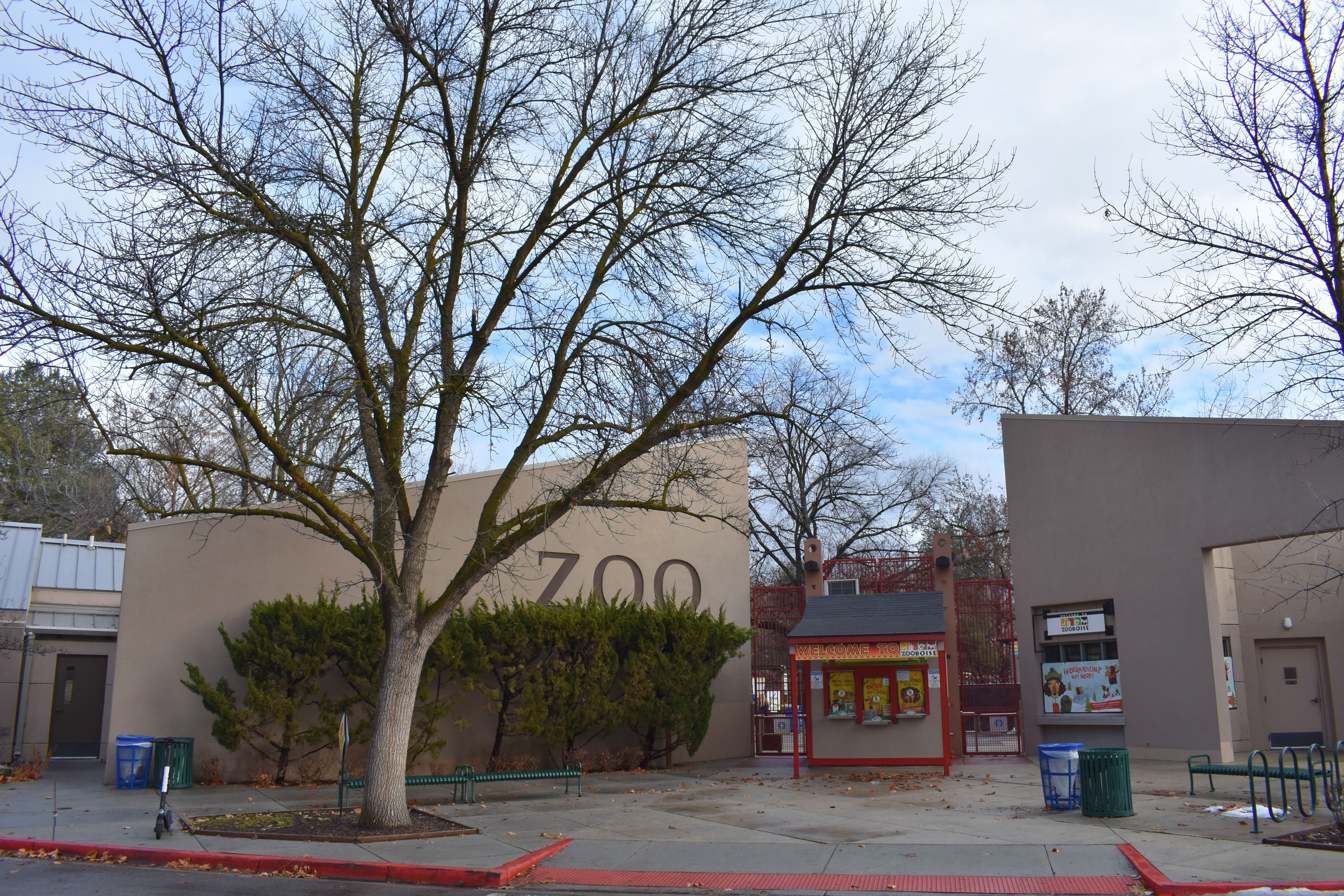
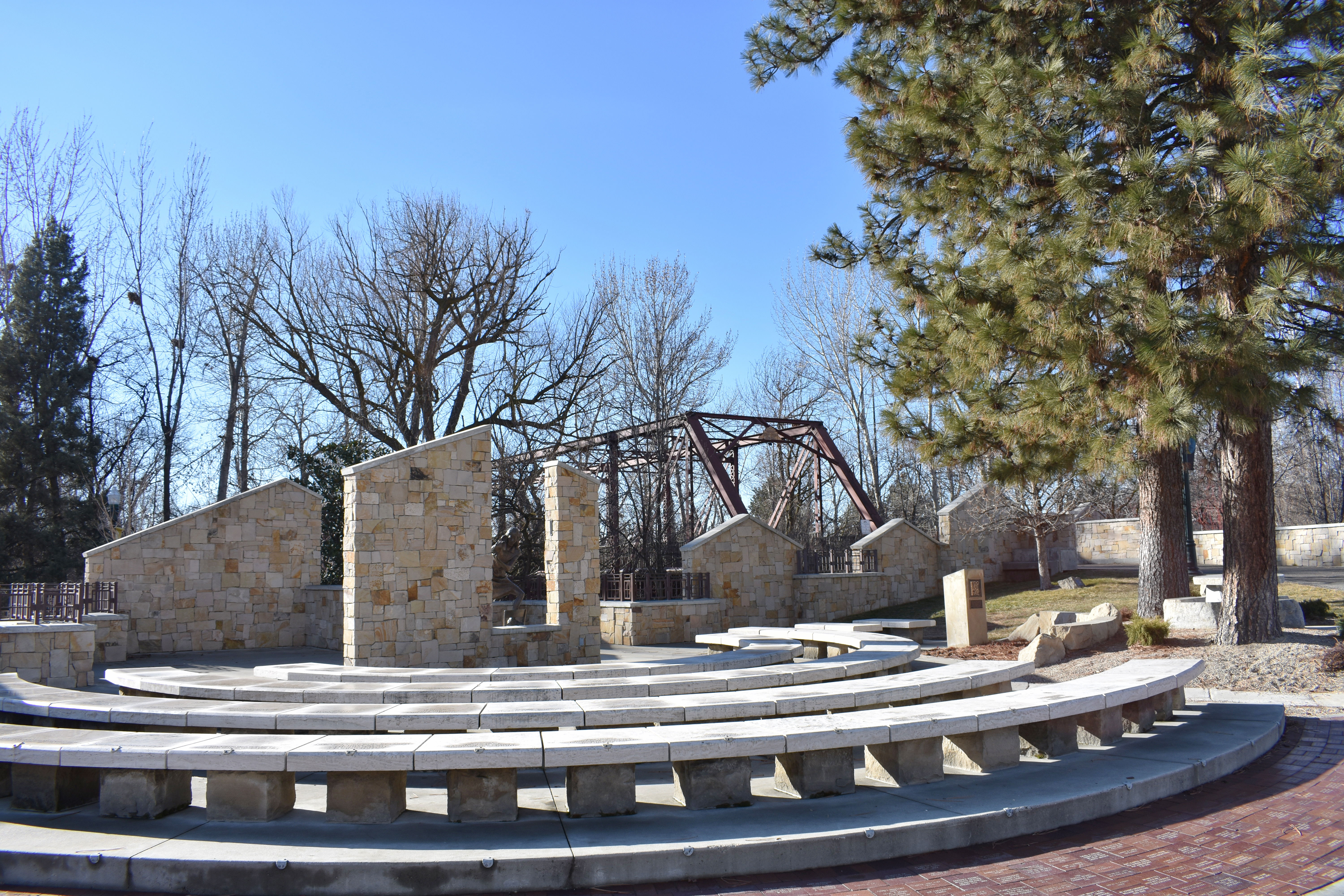
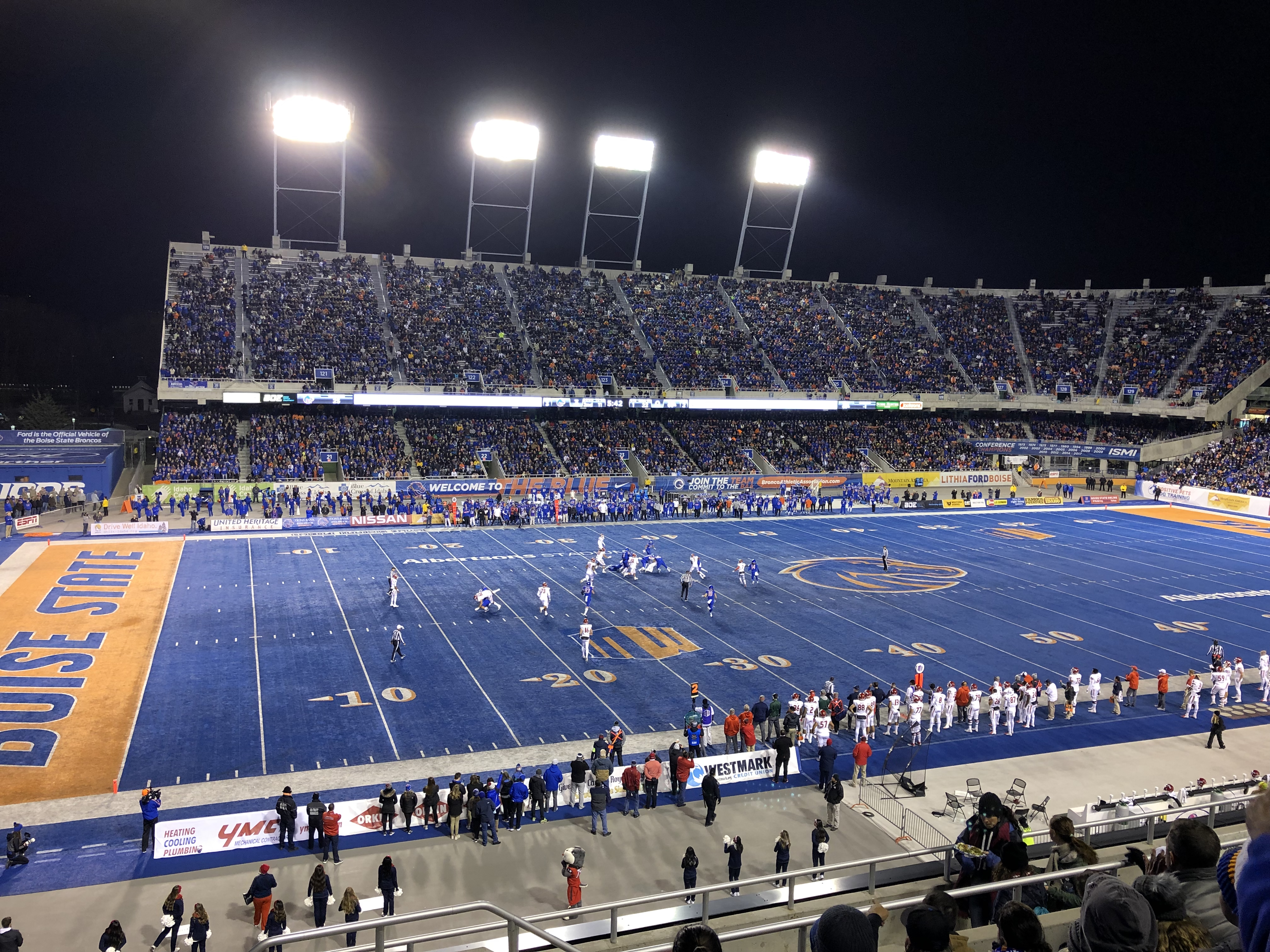
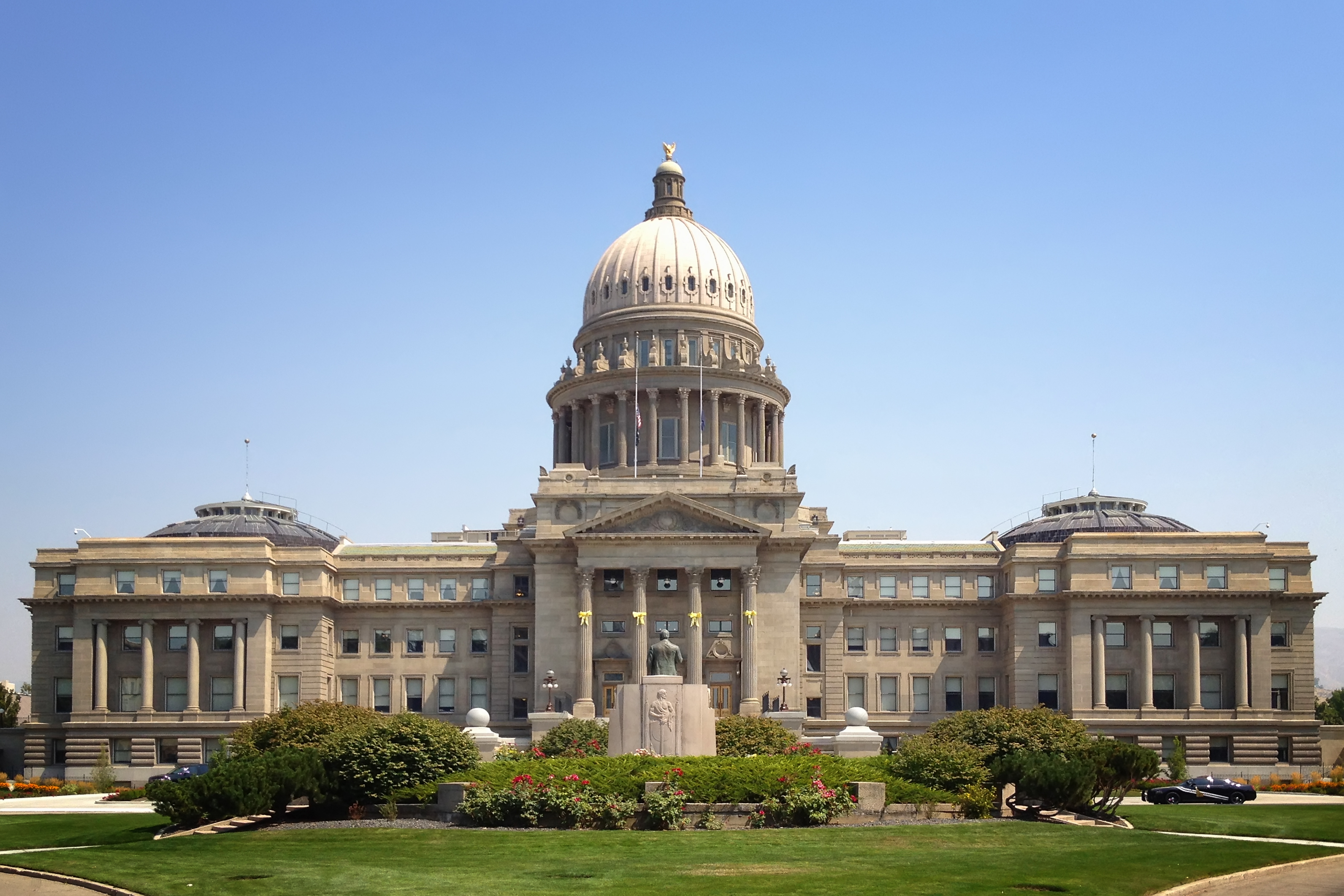
- Downtown Boise skyline Jack's Urban Meeting Place Zoo Boise at Julia Davis Park Anne Frank Human Rights Memorial Albertsons Stadium Idaho State Capitol

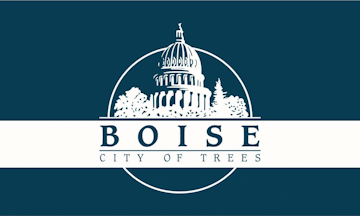
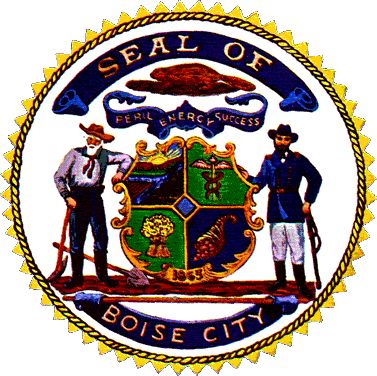
- Flag Seal Logo
- Nickname: The City of Trees
- Motto: Energy Peril Success
- Interactive map of Boise
- Location within Idaho Location within the United States
- Coordinates: 43°36′57″N 116°12′06″W
- Country: United States
- State: Idaho
- County: Ada
- Founded: 1863
- Incorporated: 1864

Government
  - Type: Strong-mayor
  - Body: Boise City Council
  - Mayor: Lauren McLean (D)

Area
  - State capital city: 84.73 sq mi (219.45 km^{2})
  - Land: 83.77 sq mi (216.96 km^{2})
  - Water: 0.96 sq mi (2.49 km^{2})
- Elevation: 2,703 ft (824 m)

Population (2020)
  - State capital city: 235,684
  - Estimate (2025): ▲238,429
  - Rank: U.S.: 95th ID: 1st
  - Density: 2,733.2/sq mi (1,055.28/km^{2})
  - Urban: 433,180 (US: 94th)
  - Urban density: 3,111/sq mi (1,201.3/km^{2})
  - Metro: 845,877 (US: 74th)
- Demonym: Boisean
- Time zone: UTC−7 (MST)
  - Summer (DST): UTC−6 (MDT)
- ZIP codes: 83701-83709, 83711-83717, 83719-83720, 83722, 83724-83726, 83728-83729, 83732, 83735, 83756, 83799
- Area code(s): 208, 986
- FIPS code: 16-08830
- GNIS feature ID: 2409876
- Website: cityofboise.org

Boise (locally /ˈbɔɪsi/ also /bɔɪzi/) is the capital and most populous city in the U.S. state of Idaho. It is the county seat of Ada County. The population of the city was 235,685 at the 2020 census. The Boise metropolitan area, located in the Treasure Valley, includes five counties of Idaho with an estimated population of 846,000, the most populous metropolitan area in Idaho and 74th-most populous in the United States.

Located on the Boise River in southwestern Idaho, it is 41 miles (66 km) east of the Oregon border and 110 miles (177 km) north of the Nevada border. Downtown Boise's elevation is 2,704 feet (824 m) above sea level.

Boise is home to major employers in the technology, manufacturing, and service sectors, including companies such as Micron Technology and Hewlett-Packard. The city is home to the Boise Art Museum, Idaho State Capitol, the annual Treefort Music Fest, and the Basque Block.

== History ==
=== Etymology ===
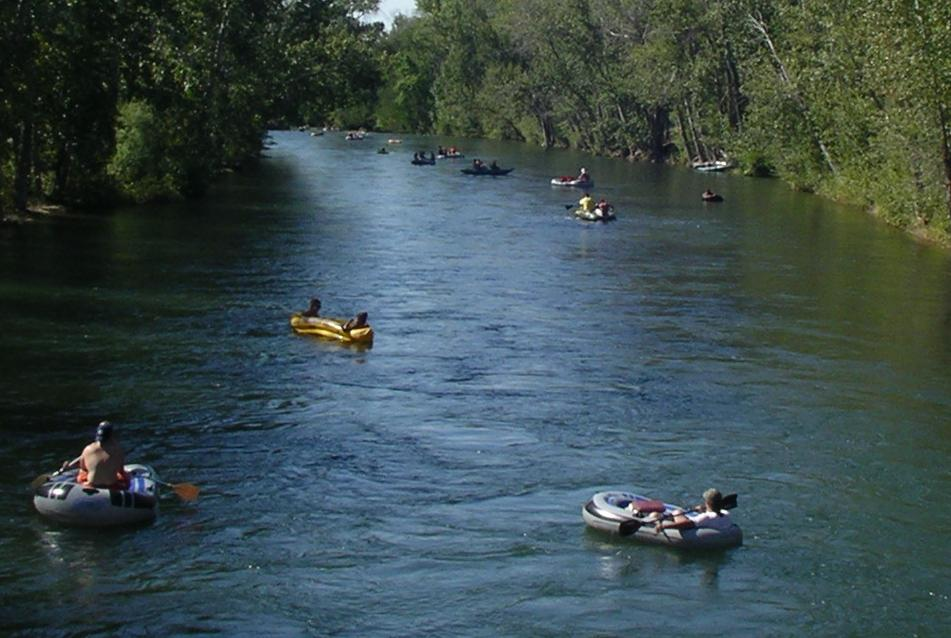
Floating the Boise River

The origin of the name is uncertain. One account credits Capt. B. L. E. Bonneville of the U.S. Army as its source. After trekking for weeks through dry and rough terrain, his exploration party reached an overlook with a view of the Boise River Valley. The place where they stood is called Bonneville Point, located on the Oregon Trail east of the city. According to the story, a French-speaking guide, overwhelmed by the sight of the verdant river, yelled "Les bois! Les bois!" ("The woods! The woods!")—and the name stuck.

The name may also derive from earlier mountain men who named the river that flows through the city. In the 1820s, French Canadian fur trappers associated with the British-owned Hudson's Bay Company set trap lines in the vicinity. Set in a high-desert area, the tree-lined valley of the Boise River became a distinct landmark, an oasis dominated by cottonwood trees. This led the French trappers to call the area "la rivière boisée" ("the wooded river").

==== Pronunciation ====
Most local and longtime residents use the pronunciation /ˈbɔɪsiː/ (BOY-see), as given on the city's website. The pronunciation is sometimes used as a shibboleth, as those from elsewhere tend to pronounce the city's name as /ˈbɔɪziː/ (BOY-zee). In French, the name of the city is pronounced /ˈbwaz/ (Bwaz).

=== Indigenous history and fur trading ===
The Boise Valley is the traditional homeland of several indigenous groups, including the Northern Shoshone and Bannock tribes. The valley had been a gathering place for trade and winter settlement. The Bannock tribe in the valley belonged to the "tuuˀagaidɨkaˀa" (black trout eaters). The Northern Shoshone belonged to the "Yahandeka" (groundhog eaters) grouping and had their main hunting lands along the lower Boise River and Payette River.

In 1811, Wilson Hunt, employed as an agent in the fur trade under John Jacob Astor, organized and led the greater part of a group of about 60 men on an overland expedition to establish a fur trading outpost at the mouth of the Columbia River. This expedition passed through the Boise valley, and was the first ever time a white American has entered the region. The War of 1812 delayed use of the trade route, and the Boise Valley initially drew little attention while the rest of the Oregon Country came to be dominated by the British Hudson's Bay Company (HBC). The company established a fort in the region, the Old Fort Boise, 40 miles (64 km) west, near Parma, down the Boise River near its confluence with the Snake River at the Oregon border. The HBC was present at the fort until 1844, and afterward handed it over to the United States Army.

=== Oregon Trail ===
Starting in the early 1840s, developments further west, in modern Oregon, meant significant changes to the region of Boise. At this time, HBC and the British started moving their operations further North into British Columbia, while there was a slow and steady rise in the number of settlers in Oregon Country, who demanded annexation. These developments eventually culminated in the Oregon Treaty, in which the British gave the region up to the US, thus ending the era of "Joint occupation". This meant that Boise Valley and much of Snake Country was claimed as Oregon Territory.

With the discovery of gold in California in 1848 and the passage of Donation Land Claim Act, the settler incursions increased exponentially. The increased settler incursions through Shoshone and Bannock territories, and their increased exploitation of the valley's game and resources on their trip, resulted in an increasing sense of frustration among the Indigenous bands along the entire Oregon Trail. Thus, starting in the early 1850s, to deter settler caravans from using the route and trespassing on their lands, Native peoples along the entire length of the trail, from modern Eastern Idaho to modern Central Oregon started staging low-intensity attacks against passing caravans.

One such attack, referred to as the "Ward Massacre", was in Boise Valley, about 20 miles west of modern Boise. On August 20, 1854, Alexander Ward's five-wagon caravan of 20 emigrants was passing through, when a group of Shoshone and Bannock warriors ambushed the caravan. The goal of the ambush was initially to take away the horses of the caravan. However, the shooting of one of the Shoshone warriors with a revolver, resulted in the killing of everyone except for two of Alexander Ward's children by the Shoshone warriors. In response, the United States Army launched the Winnas Expedition, which involved raids on Native encampments for a period of several months during the summer of 1855. In the period between 1846 and 1856, 700 white settlers were killed along the entire length of the Oregon Trail due to attacks and raids by Native warriors on their caravans while intruding native land. American military intrusion and retaliation only further angered the native tribes and escalated the conflict, which forced the United States Army to abandon Old Fort Boise. Intensified attacks against passing caravans made travel impossible for settlers except with US Army escort, which started in 1858.

=== Discovery of gold and silver ===
The decline of the California gold rush prompted white settlers to search for gold elsewhere, including much of Idaho. The 1860 discovery of gold in Nez Perce territory near Pierce, Idaho and the resultant arrival of settlers raised tensions significantly. In September of that year, the Utter Party Massacre happened about 100 miles Southeast of Boise, where 29 out of a group of 44 settlers were either killed or captured in an intense and organized ambush.

The discovery of gold around the Boise Valley in 1863, together with ongoing fighting, prompted the US Military to establish a new Fort Boise, where Boise is located today. The new location was selected because it was near the intersection of the Oregon Trail with a major road connecting the Boise Basin (Idaho City) and the Owyhee (Silver City) mining areas, both of which were booming. That year, the United States established Idaho Territory, whose boundaries included this region. After a year, with the creation of Montana Territory, Boise was made the territorial capital of a much reduced Idaho in a controversial decision that overturned a district court ruling by a one-vote majority in the territorial supreme court along geographic lines in 1866. There was no treaty and no agreement with any of the native tribes up to this point, and the violent resistance against incursion and settlement onto their territory along the Oregon Trail and at the newly found gold mines continued unabated. In order to resolve the matter of ownership and sovereignty over land, Caleb Lyon, the second governor of Idaho, negotiated with the Boise Valley Shoshone Tribe, and concluded the "Treaty of Fort Boise" on October 10, 1864. This treaty stipulated that the tribe will give up lands to 30 miles on each side of Boise River, land upon which Boise is located, while allowing an equal right to fishing in the river to both the Shoshone and the settlers. The treaty has not been ratified by the U.S. Senate to this date, and the tribe hasn't ever received any treaty payments.

Backlash from the perceived friendliness of Caleb Lyon in his dealings with the tribes led to an escalation of pressure and agitation among the White Settlers in Boise and the print media in the city, in demanding either genocide or removal of the tribes. Settler violence against Boise Valley native tribes increased considerably, with some going as far as introducing bounties to murder any native. Idaho Statesman, the daily newspaper of Boise, which started publishing in 1864, reflected many such incitements and demands:

...that the military should continue killing Indians 'until the last Indian in the Territories was either on his reservation or enriched the sagebrush with his decaying carcass.' ...if the Indians refused to move there, 'they will be killed or put on the reservation by force, and certainly shot if they don't stay there.' Furthermore, the editor continues, 'The idea that the Indians have any right to the soil is ridiculous. ...They have no more rights to the soil of the Territories of the United States than wolves or coyotes...'

— David B. Madsen's quotation of the opinion column in Idaho Statesman on July 29, 1867,

This would be our plan of establishing friendship upon an eternal basis with our Indians: Let all the hostile bands of Idaho Territory be called in (they will not be caught in any other manner) to attend a grand treaty; plenty of blankets and nice little trinkets distributed among them; plenty of grub on hand; have a real jolly time with them; then just before the big feast put strychnine in their meat and poison to death the last mother's son of them.

— A "Letter to the editor" that was printed in the Idaho Statesman newspaper on October 6, 1867,

At the same time, native warriors around the valley, under the leadership of Howluck, also known as "Bigfoot" among white settlers, among others, waged an escalating and intensified guerrilla campaign of harassment of passerby caravans along the Oregon Trail. The United States Army also escalated and intensified "punitive expeditions" against formations of warriors and against civilian communities as well. This marked the start of the "unofficial" Snake War in 1866. This war lasted until 1868 and is statistically the deadliest of the Indian Wars in the West in terms of casualties. In the end, 1,762 men were counted as casualties of this war from both sides.

In 1868, Fort Hall Indian Reservation was established in Southeastern Idaho, about 220 miles upstream, according to the terms of Fort Bridger Treaty. The Boise Valley Shoshone and Bannock Tribes were not party to this treaty. Nevertheless, in April 1869, the United States Military embarked on a campaign of "Removal, rounding up of natives in the region including in and around Boise, and expelling them with cavalry escort to Fort Hall Indian Reservation. This period is known among the Shoshone and Bannock people as Idaho's Trail of Tears. Some of the natives managed to escape, and they ran to either Duck Valley or Fort McDermitt in Nevada.

=== Incorporation and growth ===
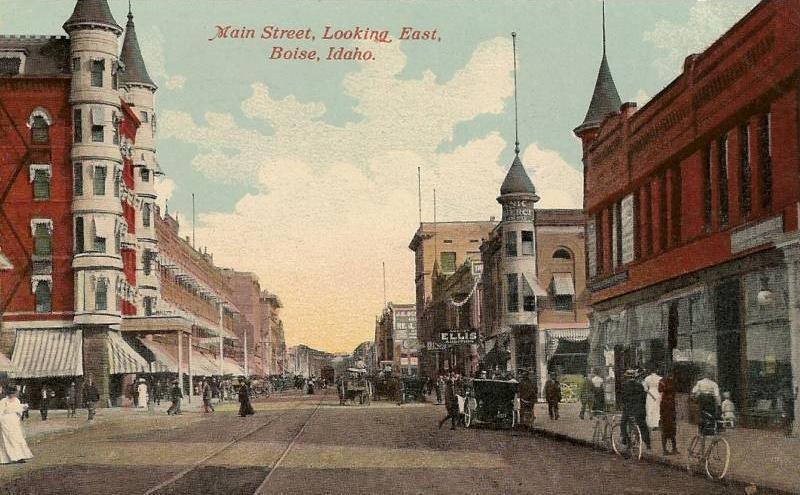
Main Street in 1911

Boise's early growth was significantly driven by its role in supplying the nearby gold towns that sprung up in the 1860s northeast and then southwest of the town. Miners sometimes wintered in Boise, and a number of early prominent businessmen were miners who settled in town in the years after the gold rush waned. By 1864 substantial agricultural production was underway on easily irrigated lands near the river and three canal companies had been incorporated. Early transportation improvements were largely a result of toll road franchises awarded by the territorial legislature starting in the 1860s. These first ran from Fort Boise to the mining centers in the Boise Basin and east to Rocky Bar and to Rattlesnake Station where they connected to the Oregon Trail.

Territorial census records from a special 1864 enumeration list the population of Boise as 1,658, and an act of December 12, 1864, was the first attempt by the Idaho Territorial Legislature to incorporate the city. This was rejected by voters the following March. Two more unsuccessful attempts were made to organize a city administration by election before the 1866 version of the city charter was approved by voters on January 6, 1868. The growing number of homes and businesses, for which owners wanted proper legal title, may have contributed to the eventual success of incorporation. All of these rejected efforts to incorporate the city came after Boise had been controversially made the state capital in 1864 over strong opposition from northern Idaho interests. This decision reflected the rapid shift of population growth from north to south after the discovery of gold in southern Idaho. By 1868 Boise had over 400 permanent buildings with a wide range of commercial services. 1868 also marked the formal beginning of a long advocacy for railroad connections to other Idaho communities and, just as importantly, to other growing cities in the west such as Portland, Oregon. Competing railroad and western state government interests frustrated these efforts for many years.

Designed by Alfred B. Mullett, the U.S. Assay Office at 210 Main Street was built in 1871 and today is a National Historic Landmark. It first began accepting gold and silver for purchase on March 2, 1872, largely eliminating the need to transport ore to the mint in San Francisco. A territorial penitentiary, now known as the Old Idaho State Penitentiary, opened the same month several miles east of town. Mining continued to be important to Boise's economic growth, and periodic booms contributed to population growth as well, though production of gold and silver probably peaked in the 1860s. 1882's gold and silver production of $3,500,000 declined to $1,488,315 (including lead) by 1899.

Boise began to earn its City of Trees nickname in this period with a popular focus on a range of tree planting projects. Thomas J. Davis planted several thousand fruit trees in 1864, and several other early businessmen either founded nurseries or orchards of their own. In the 1870s, tree planting began in earnest in downtown Boise, led by prominent hotels as well as businessmen and residents. In 1907 Davis donated 43 acres of his orchard property to the city for use as a park in the name of his wife Julia. Commercial agriculture continued to expand, but was slowed by the lack of reliable rail links to regional and national markets and by a lack of large scale irrigation projects, which themselves were often tied to hoped-for railroad projects for financing. A.D. Foote, a successful mining engineer, drew up plans to irrigate up to 500,000 acres immediately south of Boise in 1882, but progress was halting, and smaller farms were the norm until after the turn of the century, with most located near the river bottom where soil was productive and irrigation more easily achieved. Fruit orchards proliferated and sugar beets, still an important agricultural industry in Idaho, began to be widely cultivated in the 1890s. Cattle and sheep farming became increasingly important as the century closed. With the exception of dairy, most livestock products were exported from Idaho, unlike other agricultural products which were still largely scaled to support local markets. The timber industry also increasingly thrived in the Boise market in the 1880s and 1890s. Large quantities of timber were exported from elsewhere in Idaho, but a growing Boise supported the expansion of Alexander Rossi's sawmill, first established in 1865. Prominent early Boisean William Ridenbaugh had inherited control of the canal now bearing his name from his uncle William Morris in 1878 and later partnered with Rossi to expand the sawmill capacity under the name Rossi and Ridenbaugh Lumber Company. Their materials supported bridge building and the rapid expansion of Boise in the 1890s.

As with many early infrastructure ventures, electrification succeeded only after at least one false start. July 4, 1887, marked the start of electrical transmission from a plant located on the Bench. William Ridenbaugh provided expertise and manpower for the water supply, and several months were spent rigging poles and lines from the Bench to the service area across the river. Additional electrical supplies allowed the building of an electric streetcar line in 1891. This ran without interruption until buses replaced the lines in 1927, tracking—and sometimes driving—the development of Boise and nearby communities. This system expanded over several decades, reaching into the North End, South Boise, and across the river on Front St. A loop line, completed in 1912, ran as far as Caldwell and Nampa, providing transport throughout the valley. Three early trolley companies merged in 1912 to form the Idaho Traction Company with a depot at 7th and Bannock Streets downtown.

Additional services and urban amenities arrived in the 1890s as Boise grew. Exploratory drilling for hot water was successful in 1890, and by the end of the decade many homes along Warm Springs Avenue were being heated by this source. A natatorium was built in 1892 close to the source of the hot water near the Idaho State Penitentiary. Churches serving several denominations, a Jewish synagogue, a major hardware store and department store, a Masonic hall, the Columbia Theater, Saint Alphonsus' Hospital, a number of parochial and secular schools, a City Hall, and a new Union Pacific passenger station, constructed when service was finally extended to downtown, were all built during the 1890s. Falk's Department Store sponsored a semi-professional baseball team representing Boise from at least 1892, and the city supported other organized sports as they became popular. The 12th Census of the United States lists the population of Boise in 1900 as 5,957, up from 2,311 in 1890, when Idaho was admitted as the 43rd state.

=== 20th and 21st centuries ===
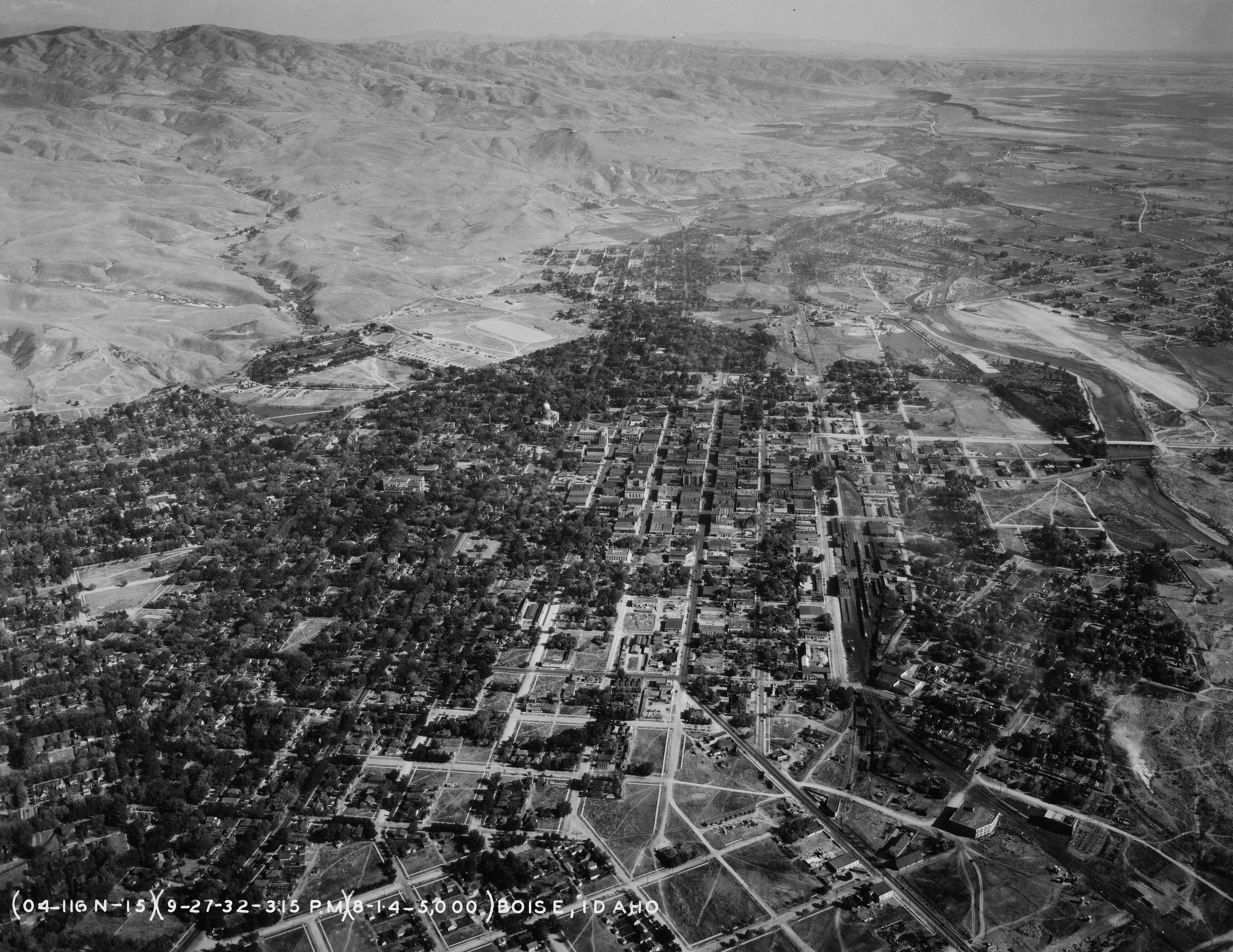
View of Boise, 1932

In the early 20th century, the development of large-scale irrogation infrastructure transformed the Boise Valley into an important agricultural region. The federal Boise Project, authorised in 1905 under the Reclamation Act of 1902, involved the construction of dams, reservoirs and irrigation canals to provide water to agricultural land in southwestern Idaho. Arrowrock Dam, constructed between 1911 and 1915, was the project’s principal storage facility and was the tallest dam in the world when completed. The irrigation system contributed significantly to the agricultural and economic development of the region.

In 1925, with the construction of Chicago-Portland railway line, Boise Union Pacific Depot was established in the city. This train station served passengers until 1997.

A "homosexual panic" erupted in the city in 1955 during the lavender scare. Police interrogated hundreds of Boise citizens, arresting sixteen men whom police believed were part of a "homosexual ring." Arrests included prominent citizens, including a bank vice president. Their trials, which received sensational coverage in the local press, resulted in lengthy prison sentences; one man was sentenced to life in prison.

In 2019, the city council approved the renaming of a park and natural preserve to names in the Shoshoni language to recognize their significance to local indigenous peoples.

Boise and the surrounding suburbs of the Treasure Valley have a system of irrigation canals and ditches. In the early 2020s, rats were observed in the Boise area using the canals and causing pest control issues across Ada County.

== Geography ==
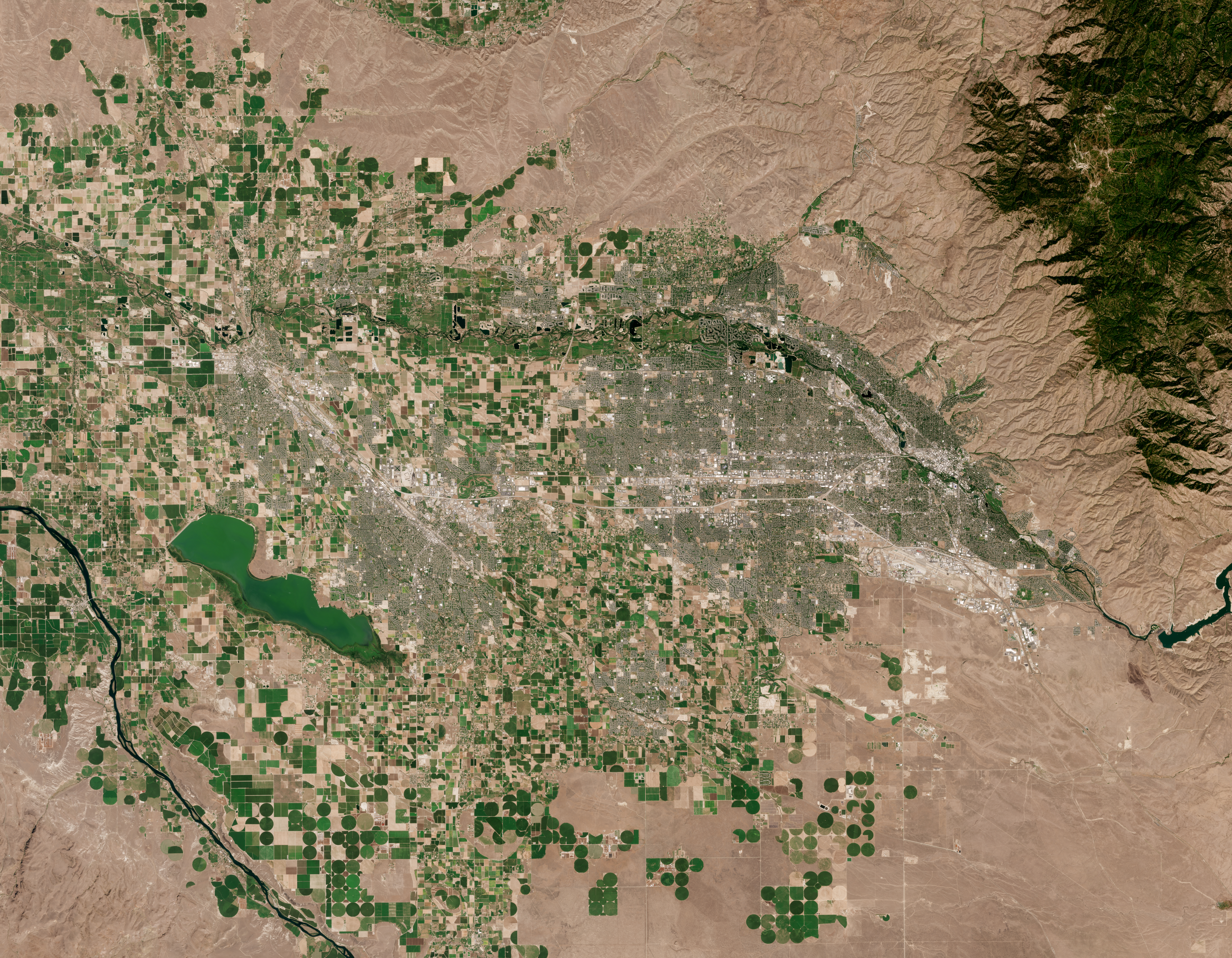
Satellite photo of Boise and surrounding area in 2021, taken from Copernicus Sentinel-2

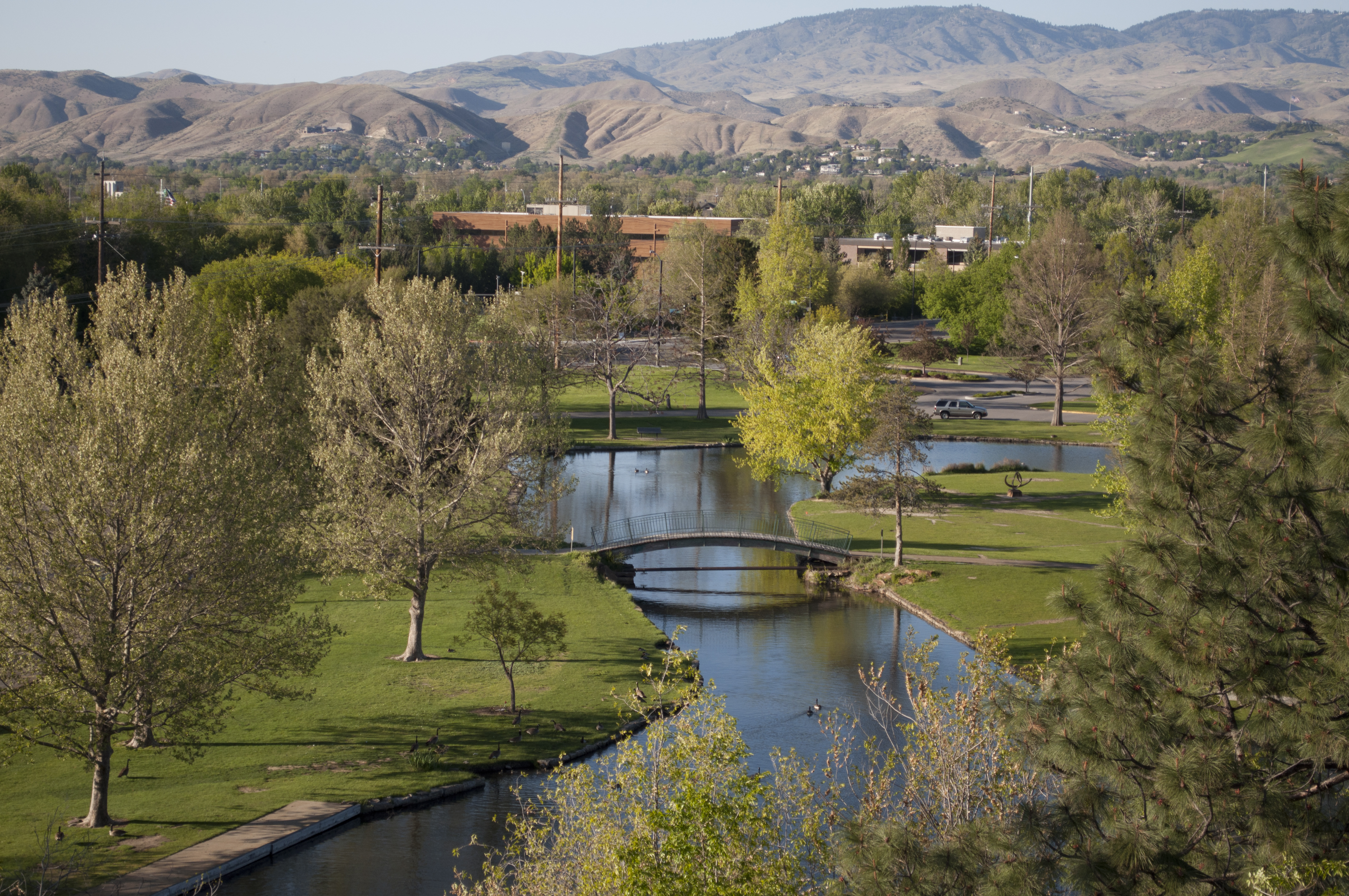
Ann Morrison Park in spring

Boise is in southwestern Idaho, about 41 miles (66 km) east of the Oregon border and 110 miles (177 km) north of the Nevada border. The downtown area's elevation is 2,704 feet (824 m) above sea level.

Most of the metropolitan area lies on a broad, flat plain, descending to the west. Mountains rise to the northeast, stretching from the far southeastern tip of the Boise city limits to nearby Eagle. These mountains are known to locals as the Boise foothills and are sometimes described as the foothills of the Rocky Mountains. About 34 miles (55 km) southwest of Boise, and about 26 miles (42 km) southwest of Nampa, the Owyhee Mountains lie entirely in neighboring Owyhee County.

According to the United States Census Bureau, the city has an area of 80.05 square miles (207.33 km^{2}), of which 79.36 square miles (205.54 km^{2}) is land and 0.69 square miles (1.79 km^{2}) is water. The city is drained by the Boise River and is considered part of the Treasure Valley.

=== Neighborhoods and areas ===
Boise occupies an area of 64 sq mi (170 km^{2}), according to the United States Census Bureau. Neighborhoods of Boise include the Bench, the North End, West Boise and Downtown. In January 2014, the Boise Police Department partnered with the neighborhood blogging site Nextdoor, the first city in the Northwest and the 137th city in the U.S. to do so. Since the app, which enables the city's police, fire, and parks departments to post to self-selected, highly localized areas, first became available in October 2011, 101 neighborhoods and sections of neighborhoods have joined.

==== Downtown Boise ====
Downtown Boise is Boise's cultural center and home to many small businesses as well as a growing number of high-rises. While downtown Boise lacks a major retail/dining focus like Seattle and Portland, the area has a variety of shops and growing option for dining choices. Centrally, 8th Street contains a pedestrian zone with sidewalk cafes and restaurants. The neighborhood has many local restaurants, bars, and boutiques and supports a vibrant nightlife. The area contains the Basque Block, which gives visitors a chance to learn about and enjoy Boise's Basque heritage. Downtown Boise's main attractions include the Idaho State Capitol, the classic Egyptian Theatre on the corner of Capitol Boulevard and Main Street, the Boise Art Museum on Capitol in front of Julia Davis Park, and Zoo Boise on the grounds of Julia Davis Park.

Boise's economy was threatened in the late 1990s by commercial development at locations away from the downtown center, such as Boise Towne Square Mall and at shopping centers near new housing developments.

Cultural events in Downtown Boise include Alive after Five and First Thursday.

==== Boise State University ====
To the south of downtown Boise is Boise State University and its surrounding environs. The area is dominated by residential neighborhoods and businesses catering to the student population. The unique blue playing field at the 37,000-seat Albertsons Stadium on the BSU campus, home to the Boise State Broncos football team, is a major city landmark. Other cultural and sports centers in the area include the Velma V. Morrison Center for the Performing Arts and ExtraMile Arena. Broadway Avenue to the east and south of the BSU campus features many college-themed bars and restaurants.

==== The North End ====
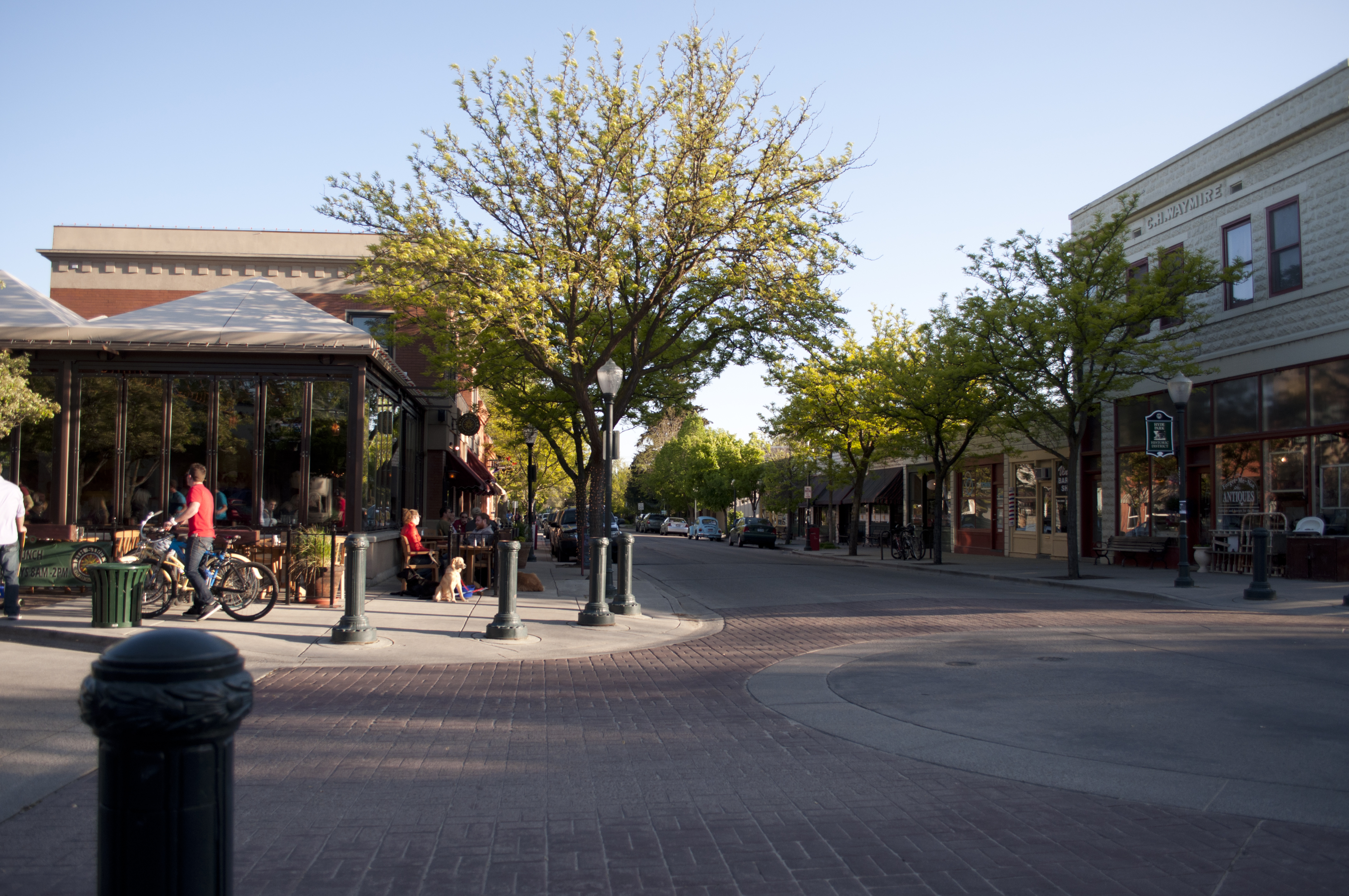
Hyde Park

View of north Boise from Camel's Back Park

The North End, generally defined as the part of Boise north of State Street, contains many of the city's older homes. It is known for its tree-lined drives such as Harrison Boulevard, and for its quiet neighborhoods near the downtown area. Downtown Boise is visible from Camel's Back Park. On 13th Street, Hyde Park is home to restaurants and other businesses. The North End also hosts events such as the annual Hyde Park Street Fair. In 2008, the American Planning Association designated Boise's North End one of 10 Great Neighborhoods.

==== Boise Highlands ====
The Boise Highlands is just north of the North End; its location is generally defined as north of Hill Road and east of Bogus Basin Road. Annexed by the city in late 1965, the neighborhood is mostly filled with homes constructed in the 1970s, as well as the golf course of Crane Creek Country Club.

==== Southwest Boise ====
Southwest Boise contains sparsely populated neighborhoods built from the 1960s to the early 1980s. Many include acre-sized plots and the occasional farmhouse and pasture. In the 1980s, growth in the area was stunted to prevent urban sprawl. Since this has been lifted, there has been widespread growth of new homes and neighborhoods. The area lies near Interstate 84, and features, the Boise Airport, theaters, shopping, golf and the Boise Bench area.

==== Northwest Boise ====
Northwest Boise lies against the Boise Foothills to the north, State Street to the south, the city of Eagle to the west, and downtown Boise to the east. It contains a mix of old and new neighborhoods, including Lakeharbor, which features the private Silver Lake, a reclaimed quarry. Northwest Boise has some pockets of older homes with a similar aesthetic to the North End. Downtown is minutes away, as is Veteran's Memorial Park and easy access to the Boise Greenbelt. Across the river sits the Boise Bench and to the west are the bedroom communities of Eagle, Star, and Middleton.

==== Warm Springs and East End ====
Warm Springs is centered on the tree-lined Warm Springs Avenue and contains some of Boise's largest and most expensive homes (many of which were erected by wealthy miners and businessmen around the turn of the 20th century; Victorian styles feature prominently). The area gets its name from the natural hot springs that flow from Boise's fault line and warm many of the area's homes. The Natotorium public swim center is here.

==== Harris Ranch and Riverland East ====
The far-east end of Warm Springs was once known as Barber Town, featuring a hotel with hot springs nestled into the foothills. It now has some new residential developments, with easy access to Highway 21, which leads to the south-central Idaho mountains, the Boise River, the Boise Foothills, Idaho Department of Parks and Recreation, and the Idaho Shakespeare Festival.

==== Southeast Boise ====
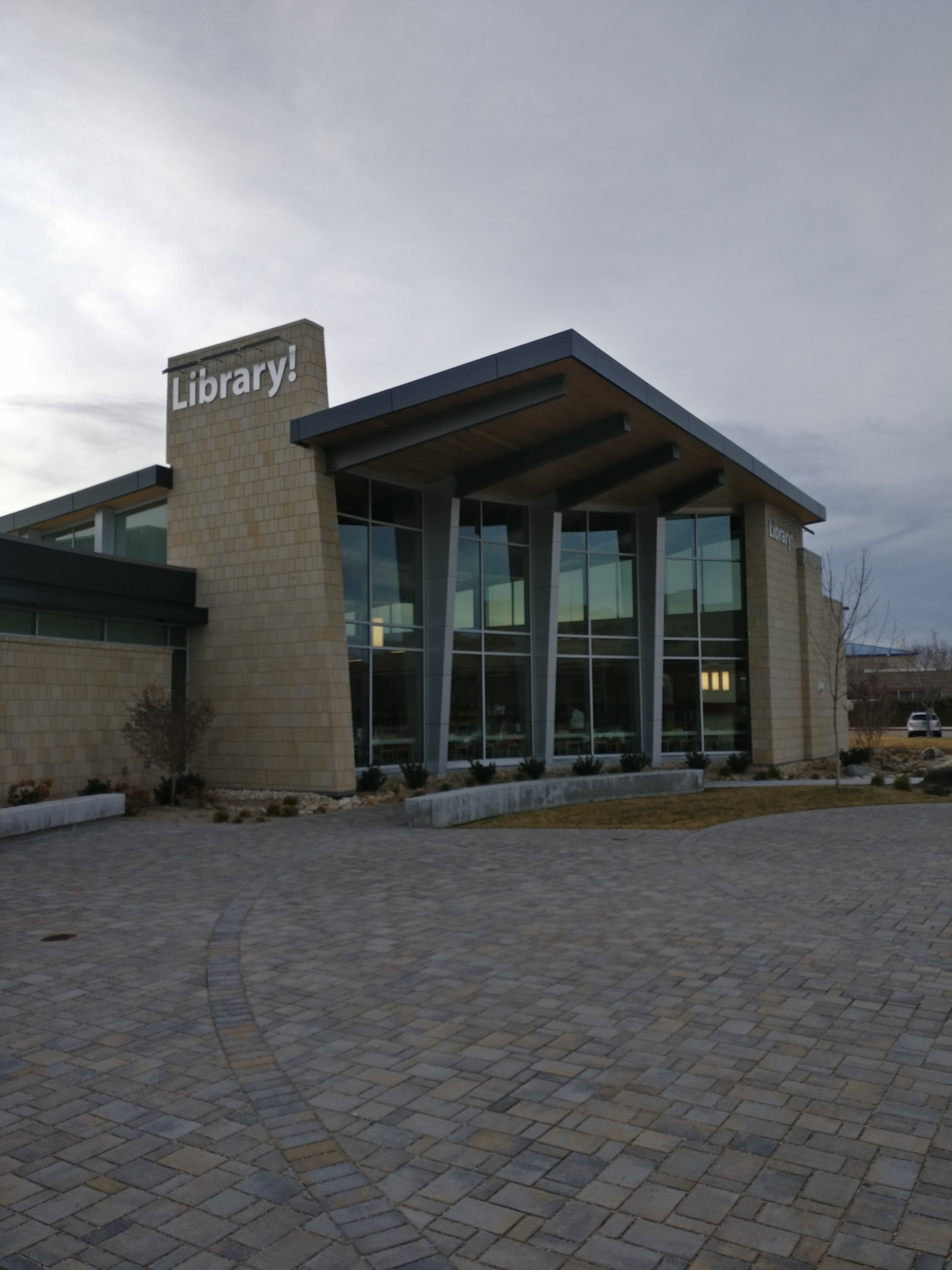
The newest Boise Public Library branch at Bown Crossing

Southeast Boise ranges from Boise State University to Micron Technology between Federal Way and the Boise River. Its oldest neighborhood, Original South Boise, was platted in 1890, and accordingly has variegated housing (assiduously maintained by zoning); it consists of 33 blocks bordered by W Beacon Street, S Boise Avenue, and S Broadway Avenue, and hence is a triangular neighborhood immediately adjoining BSU. The rest of Southeast Boise was developed over the decades, largely by a variety of suburban-style homes.

Columbia Village subdivision and the older Oregon Trail Heights were the first major planned communities in Southeast Boise with an elementary and middle school all within walking distance from all homes. The subdivision is at the intersections of Interstate 84, Idaho 21, and Federal Way (former U.S. Highway), which are all major arteries to get anywhere in Boise. The subdivision, a baseball complex, and swimming pools were developed around the Simplot Sports complex. The fields are built over an old landfill and dump, and the fields and gravel parking lot allow radon gases to escape through the ground. The most recent planned community is the 35-acre (14 ha) Bown Crossing, which has easy access to the Boise Greenbelt.

On August 25, 2008, at about 7:00 pm, a fire started near Amity and Holcomb during a major windstorm. It destroyed ten houses and damaged nine. One person died in the fire.

==== Boise Bench ====
The Bench, generally bounded by Federal Way to the east, Cole Road to the west and Garden City to the north, sits on an elevation approximately 60 feet (18 m) higher than downtown Boise to its northeast. Orchard Street is a major north–south thoroughfare in the neighborhood. The Bench is so named because of this sudden rise, giving the appearance of a step, or bench. The Bench (or Benches, there are three actual benches in the Boise Valley) was created as an ancient shoreline to the old river channel. The Bench is home to the Boise Union Pacific Depot. Like the North End, the Bench has older residential areas such as the Central Rim, Morris Hill, and Depot Bench neighborhoods. Due south of the Bench is the Boise Airport.

==== West Boise ====
West Boise is home to Boise Towne Square Mall, the largest in the state, as well as many restaurants, strip malls, and residential developments ranging from new subdivisions to apartment complexes. The Ada County jail and Hewlett-Packard's printing division are also here. It is relatively the flattest section of Boise, with sweeping views of the Boise Front. West Boise also borders the city of Meridian.

=== Cityscape ===
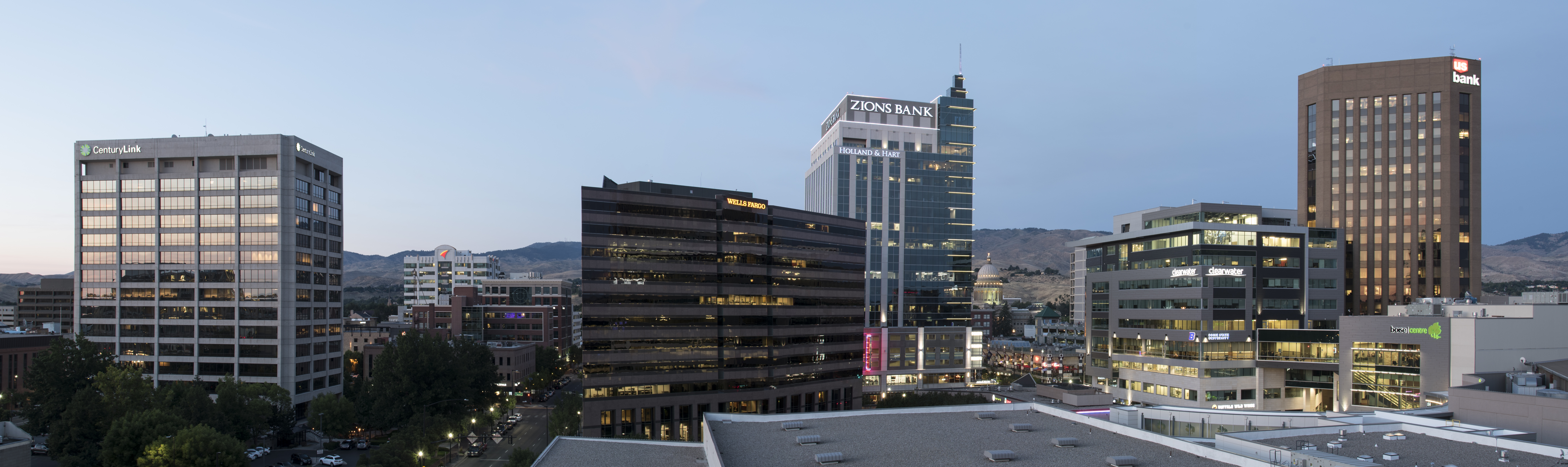
Boise from the Aspen Condos and Lofts
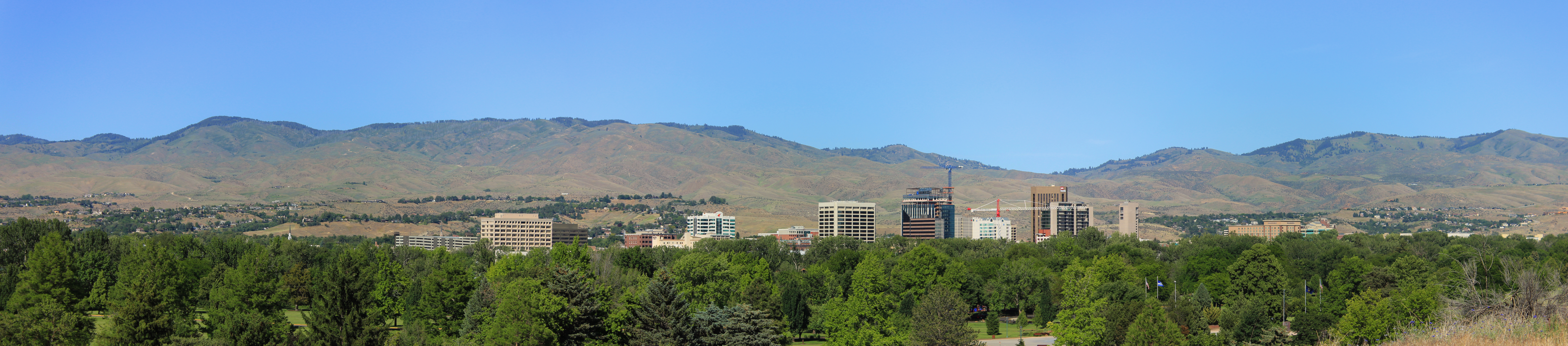
Downtown Boise as seen from the Boise Bench

=== Climate ===
Boise, Idaho

Climate chart (precipitation, max. and min. temperature)
J	F	M	A	M	J	J	A	S	O	N	D
1.4 39 26	1 46 29	1.3 56 35	1.2 62 40	1.5 72 48	0.8 81 54	0.2 93 62	0.2 91 61	0.4 80 53	0.8 65 42	1.2 49 32	1.5 39 25
- █ Average max. and min. temperatures in °F
- █ Precipitation totals in inches
Metric conversion
J	F	M	A	M	J	J	A	S	O	N	D
36 4 −4	25 8 −2	34 13 2	31 17 4	37 22 9	19 27 12	5.3 34 17	4.3 33 16	11 27 11	21 18 5	30 9 0	39 4 −4
- █ Average max. and min. temperatures in °C
- █ Precipitation totals in mm

Boise has a cool semi-arid climate (Köppen climate classification BSk, Trewartha climate classification BSak), with four distinct seasons. Boise experiences hot and dry summers with highs reaching 100 °F (38 °C) nine days in a typical year and 90 °F (32 °C) on 55 days. Yet because of the aridity, average diurnal temperature variation exceeds 30 °F (17 °C) in the height of summer. Winters are moderately cold, with a December average of 32.1 °F (0.1 °C), and lows falling to 0 °F (−18 °C) or below on around one night per year, with some winters having several such readings and most having none at all. Snowfall averages 18 inches (46 cm), but typically falls in bouts of 3 inches (8 cm) or less. Spring and fall are mild. Extremes have ranged from −28 °F (−33 °C) on January 16, 1888, to 111 °F (44 °C) on July 12, 1898, and July 19, 1960; temperatures have reached −25 °F (−32 °C) and 110 °F (43 °C) as recently as December 22, 1990, and August 10, 2018, respectively. Precipitation is usually infrequent and light, especially so during the summer months. It averages approximately 12 inches (30 cm) annually.

Tornadoes are rare in Ada County and the Boise area. Since 1950, only twelve tornadoes have been documented within the county, and four of those were during the same storm on August 3, 2000, which is also the most recent date a tornado was documented in the area. None of the tornadoes have been ranked higher than an F1 on the Fujita scale, and no injuries or fatalities were ever documented.

Climate data for Boise Airport, Idaho (1991–2020 normals, (Note: Mean monthly maxima and minima (i.e. the highest and lowest temperature readings during an entire month or year) calculated based on data at said location from 1991 to 2020.) extremes 1875–present (Note: Official records have been kept at downtown Boise from January 1875 to December 1939, and at Boise Air Terminal (Airport) since January 1940. For more information, see ThreadEx.))
Month	Jan	Feb	Mar	Apr	May	Jun	Jul	Aug	Sep	Oct	Nov	Dec	Year
Record high °F (°C)	66 (19)	71 (22)	83 (28)	92 (33)	100 (38)	110 (43)	111 (44)	110 (43)	104 (40)	94 (34)	78 (26)	70 (21)	111 (44)
Mean maximum °F (°C)	52.6 (11.4)	59.5 (15.3)	71.0 (21.7)	80.7 (27.1)	90.1 (32.3)	98.3 (36.8)	104.5 (40.3)	102.2 (39.0)	95.9 (35.5)	83.9 (28.8)	65.0 (18.3)	54.5 (12.5)	105.2 (40.7)
Mean daily maximum °F (°C)	38.8 (3.8)	46.0 (7.8)	55.5 (13.1)	62.3 (16.8)	72.3 (22.4)	81.4 (27.4)	92.7 (33.7)	90.7 (32.6)	80.0 (26.7)	64.8 (18.2)	48.8 (9.3)	38.8 (3.8)	64.3 (17.9)
Daily mean °F (°C)	32.2 (0.1)	37.5 (3.1)	45.2 (7.3)	50.9 (10.5)	59.9 (15.5)	67.8 (19.9)	77.3 (25.2)	75.8 (24.3)	66.3 (19.1)	53.2 (11.8)	40.3 (4.6)	32.1 (0.1)	53.2 (11.8)
Mean daily minimum °F (°C)	25.5 (−3.6)	29.0 (−1.7)	34.9 (1.6)	39.6 (4.2)	47.5 (8.6)	54.1 (12.3)	61.9 (16.6)	60.8 (16.0)	52.6 (11.4)	41.5 (5.3)	31.7 (−0.2)	25.4 (−3.7)	42.0 (5.6)
Mean minimum °F (°C)	10.0 (−12.2)	15.8 (−9.0)	22.8 (−5.1)	27.5 (−2.5)	33.0 (0.6)	41.0 (5.0)	50.4 (10.2)	48.2 (9.0)	38.4 (3.6)	26.6 (−3.0)	17.4 (−8.1)	10.9 (−11.7)	5.1 (−14.9)
Record low °F (°C)	−28 (−33)	−15 (−26)	5 (−15)	11 (−12)	22 (−6)	30 (−1)	35 (2)	32 (0)	23 (−5)	11 (−12)	−10 (−23)	−25 (−32)	−28 (−33)
Average precipitation inches (mm)	1.41 (36)	1.00 (25)	1.33 (34)	1.23 (31)	1.45 (37)	0.75 (19)	0.21 (5.3)	0.17 (4.3)	0.43 (11)	0.81 (21)	1.18 (30)	1.54 (39)	11.51 (292)
Average snowfall inches (cm)	5.3 (13)	3.3 (8.4)	1.2 (3.0)	0.1 (0.25)	0.0 (0.0)	0.0 (0.0)	0.0 (0.0)	0.0 (0.0)	0.0 (0.0)	0.1 (0.25)	2.0 (5.1)	5.6 (14)	17.6 (45)
Average precipitation days (≥ 0.01 in)	11.1	9.1	10.1	9.2	8.4	5.3	2.3	2.1	3.9	6.0	9.7	12.0	89.2
Average snowy days (≥ 0.1 in)	5.2	3.3	1.6	0.3	0.0	0.0	0.0	0.0	0.0	0.1	2.2	5.5	18.2
Average relative humidity (%)	75.0	69.9	59.5	52.3	48.7	44.7	36.1	37.2	45.1	53.6	68.5	74.6	55.4
Average dew point °F (°C)	21.6 (−5.8)	25.9 (−3.4)	27.3 (−2.6)	30.2 (−1.0)	36.0 (2.2)	41.4 (5.2)	43.2 (6.2)	42.3 (5.7)	37.9 (3.3)	32.7 (0.4)	28.9 (−1.7)	22.5 (−5.3)	32.5 (0.3)
Mean monthly sunshine hours	109.3	151.9	238.6	281.4	335.5	351.6	399.8	358.8	303.6	238.1	119.6	105.2	2,993.4
Percentage possible sunshine	38	52	64	70	74	76	86	83	81	70	41	38	67
Source: NOAA (relative humidity, dew point, and sun 1961–1990)

== Demographics ==
Historical population
Census	Pop.	Note	%±
1870	995		—
1880	1,899		90.9%
1890	2,311		21.7%
1900	5,957		157.8%
1910	17,358		191.4%
1920	21,393		23.2%
1930	21,544		0.7%
1940	26,130		21.3%
1950	34,393		31.6%
1960	34,481		0.3%
1970	74,990		117.5%
1980	102,249		36.4%
1990	125,738		23.0%
2000	185,787		47.8%
2010	205,671		10.7%
2020	235,684		14.6%
2025 (est.)	238,429		1.2%
U.S. Decennial Census

=== 2020 census ===
The 2020 U.S. census counted 235,684 people, 97,456 households, and 56,662 families in Boise. The population density was 2,805 per square mile (1,083/km^{2}). There were 102,295 housing units at an average density of 1,217 units per square mile (470 units/km^{2}). The racial makeup was 81.24% (191,462) white or European American (78.85% non-Hispanic white), 2.27% (5,345) black or African-American, 0.7% (1,639) Native American or Alaska Native, 3.58% (8,429) Asian, 0.29% (693) Pacific Islander or Native Hawaiian, 3.45% (8,133) from other races, and 8.48% (19,983) from two or more races. Hispanic or Latino residents of any race were 9.03% (21,276) of the population.

Of the 97,456 households, 26.2% had children under the age of 18; 43.7% were married couples living together; 27.1% had a female householder with no spouse or partner present. 30.2% of households consisted of individuals and 10.6% had someone living alone who was 65 years of age or older. The average household size was 2.4 and the average family size was 3.0. The percent of those with a bachelor's degree or higher was estimated to be 29.9% of the population.

20.3% of the population was under the age of 18, 11.2% from 18 to 24, 29.0% from 25 to 44, 23.7% from 45 to 64, and 15.7% who were 65 years of age or older. The median age was 37.1 years. For every 100 females, there were 101.9 males. For every 100 females ages 18 and older, there were 104.2 males.

Boise, Idaho – Racial and ethnic composition Note: the US Census treats Hispanic/Latino as an ethnic category. This table excludes Latinos from the racial categories and assigns them to a separate category. Hispanics/Latinos may be of any race.
Race / Ethnicity (NH = Non-Hispanic)	Pop 1990	Pop 2000	Pop 2010	Pop 2020	% 1990	% 2000	% 2010	% 2020
White alone (NH)	118,864	167,022	175,310	185,838	94.53%	89.90%	85.24%	78.85%
Black or African American alone (NH)	27	1,363	2,901	5,142	0.00%	0.73%	1.41%	2.18%
Native American or Alaska Native alone (NH)	743	1,147	1,107	1,145	0.59%	0.62%	0.54%	0.49%
Asian alone (NH)	1,933	3,812	6,398	8,293	1.54%	2.05%	3.11%	3.52%
Pacific Islander alone (NH)	1,933	281	432	640	1.54%	0.15%	0.21%	0.27%
Other race alone (NH)	72	239	309	1,331	0.00%	0.13%	0.15%	0.56%
Mixed race or Multiracial (NH)	72	3,513	4,608	12,019	0.00%	1.89%	2.24%	5.10%
Hispanic or Latino (any race)	3,423	8,410	14,606	21,276	2.72%	4.53%	7.10%	9.03%
Total	125,738	185,787	205,671	235,684	100.00%	100.00%	100.00%	100.00%

=== 2010 census ===
As of the 2010 census, there were 205,671 people, 85,704 households, and 50,647 families residing in the city. The population density was 2,591.6 inhabitants per square mile (1,000.6/km^{2}). There were 92,700 housing units at an average density of 1,168.1 units per square mile (451.0 units/km^{2}). The city's racial makeup was 89.0% White, 1.5% African American, 0.7% Native American, 3.2% Asian, 0.2% Pacific Islander, 2.5% from other races, and 3.0% from two or more races. Hispanic or Latino people of any race were 7.1% of the population.

There were 85,704 households, of which 29.6% had children under the age of 18 living with them, 44% were married couples living together, 10% had a woman householder with no husband present, 4.5% had a man householder with no wife present, and 41% were non-families. 31% of all households were made up of individuals, and 8.5% had someone living alone who was 65 years of age or older. The average household size was 2.36 and the average family size was 3.

The median age in the city was 35. 23% of residents were under the age of 18; 11% were between the ages of 18 and 24; 29% were from 25 to 44; 26% were from 45 to 64; and 11% were 65 years of age or older. The city's gender makeup was 49% men and 51% women.

== Economy ==
Boise is the headquarters for several major companies, such as Boise Cascade LLC, Albertsons, J.R. Simplot Company, Lamb Weston, Idaho Pacific Lumber Company, Idaho Timber, WinCo Foods, Bodybuilding.com, and Clearwater Analytics. Other major industries are headquartered in Boise or have large manufacturing facilities present. The state government is one of the city's largest employers.

The area's largest private, locally based, publicly traded employer is Micron Technology. Others include IDACORP, Inc., the parent company of Idaho Power, Idaho Bancorp, Boise, Inc., American Ecology Corp., and PCS Edventures.com Inc.

Technology investment and the high-tech industry have become increasingly important to the city, with businesses including Hewlett-Packard, Cradlepoint, Healthwise, Bodybuilding.com, ClickBank, Crucial.com, and MarkMonitor. The call center industry is also a major source of employment. There are over 20 call centers in the city employing more than 7,000 people, including WDSGlobal, Electronic Data Systems, Teleperformance, DirecTV, Taos, and T-Mobile.

Varney Air Lines, founded by Walter Varney in 1926, was formed in Boise, though headquartered at Pasco, Washington due to its more attractive prospects and increased economic support in Washington. The original airmail contract was from Pasco to Elko, Nevada, with stops in Boise in both directions. Varney Air Lines is the original predecessor company of present-day United Airlines, which still serves the city at the newly renovated and upgraded Boise Airport.

=== Top employers ===
According to the City of Boise 2023 Annual Comprehensive Report, the top employers in the city are:

Employer	# of Employees
St. Luke's Health Systems	6,000–6,999
Micron Technology	5,000–5,999
Saint Alphonsus Regional Medical Center	5,000–5,999
West Ada School District	4,000–4,999
Boise State University	3,000–3,999
Walmart	3,000–3,999
Albertsons Inc.	3,000–3,999
Idaho Department of Health and Welfare	3,000–3,999
City of Boise	3,000–3,999
J.R. Simplot Company	3,000–3,999

- Note: this list only includes companies who have given the Idaho Department of Labor permission to release their employment numbers.

== Culture ==
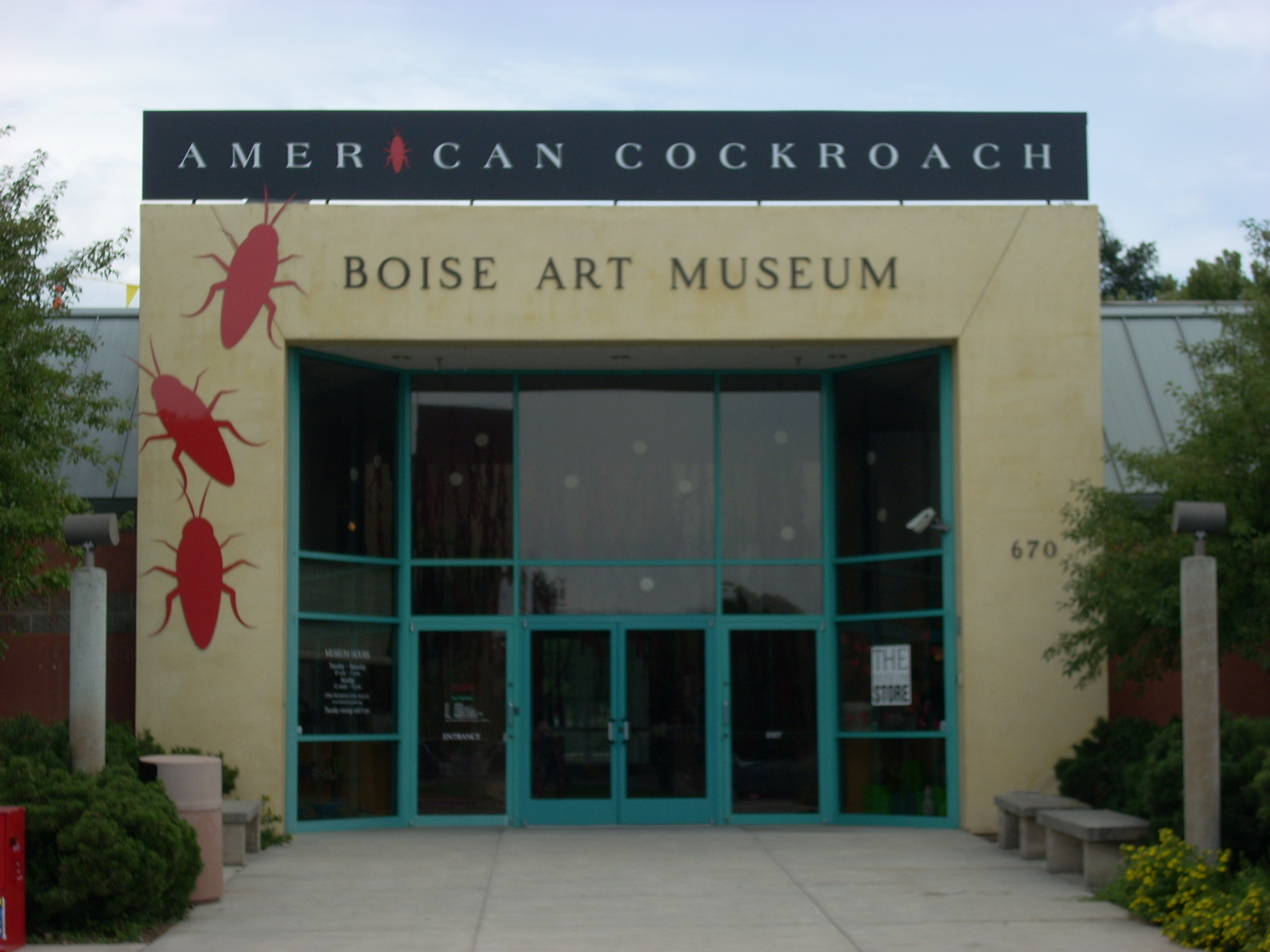
Boise Art Museum

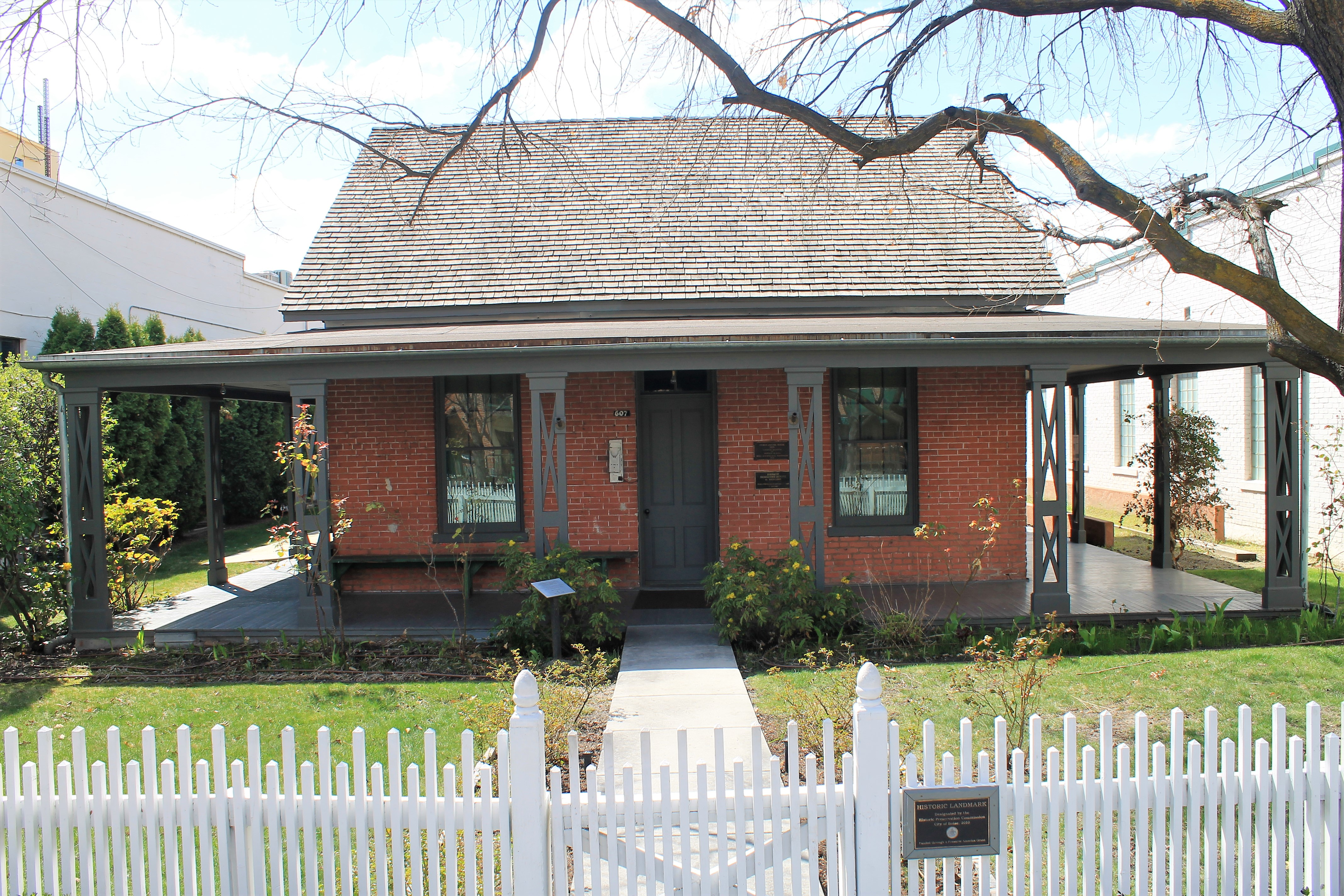
Historical Home on Boise's Basque Block

Boise is a regional hub for jazz, theater, and indie music. The Gene Harris Jazz Festival is hosted in Boise each spring. Several theater groups operate in the city, including the Idaho Shakespeare Festival, Boise Little Theatre, Boise Contemporary Theater, and ComedySportz Boise, amongst others. The Treefort Music Fest in late March features emerging bands, as well as many other artistic endeavors, and has perforce "morphed from quirky music festival to consuming community event," and the HomeGrown Theatre is notable for continuing the avant garde satirical tradition of puppetry for millennials. The renovated Egyptian Theatre hosts national and regional music acts, comedians, and special film screenings.

Idaho's ethnic Basque community is one of the largest in the United States, on the order of nearly 7,000 people in 2000, many of whom live in Boise. A large Basque festival known as Jaialdi is held once every five years (next in 2030). Downtown Boise features a vibrant section known as the "Basque Block". Boise's former mayor, David H. Bieter, is of Basque descent. Boise is also a sister region of the Basque communities.

Boise is home to several museums, including the Boise Art Museum, Idaho Historical Museum, the Basque Museum and Cultural Center, Idaho Black History Museum, Boise WaterShed and the Discovery Center of Idaho. On the first Thursday of each month, a gallery stroll known as First Thursday is hosted in the city's core business district by the Downtown Boise Association.

The arts scene in Boise includes the Boise Philharmonic, now in its 49th season, under the leadership of music director and Conductor Eric Garcia. The dance community is represented by the Ballet Idaho under artistic director Peter Anastos, and the nationally known and critically acclaimed Trey McIntyre Project also make their home in Boise. All of these perform at the Velma V. Morrison Center for the Performing Arts, on the Boise State University campus. The Morrison Center also hosts local and national fine arts performances. Rounding out the classical performing arts is Opera Idaho, under the direction of Mark Junkert, which brings grand Opera to various venues throughout the Treasure Valley.

The Boise City Department of Arts and History was created in 2008 with the goal of promoting the arts, culture, and history of the city among its residents and visitors. Since 1978 Boise had a public arts commission like many cities to promote public art and education. The Arts Commission provided expert advice on public art installations to the city and private groups, as well as to develop many educational programs within the city promoting the arts. In 2008 the city and the Arts Commission made the decision to introduce history into the scope of the art commission and rename this new commission the Boise City Department of Arts and History.

The Boise City Department of Arts and History oversees several ongoing projects and programs related to art, culture, and history, and a number of short-term projects at any given time. Ongoing projects include maintenance of a public art collection valued at over $3 million, creation and maintenance of city historical and art walks and tours, maintenance of a city historical research collection, artists in residence, and the Fettuccine Forum.

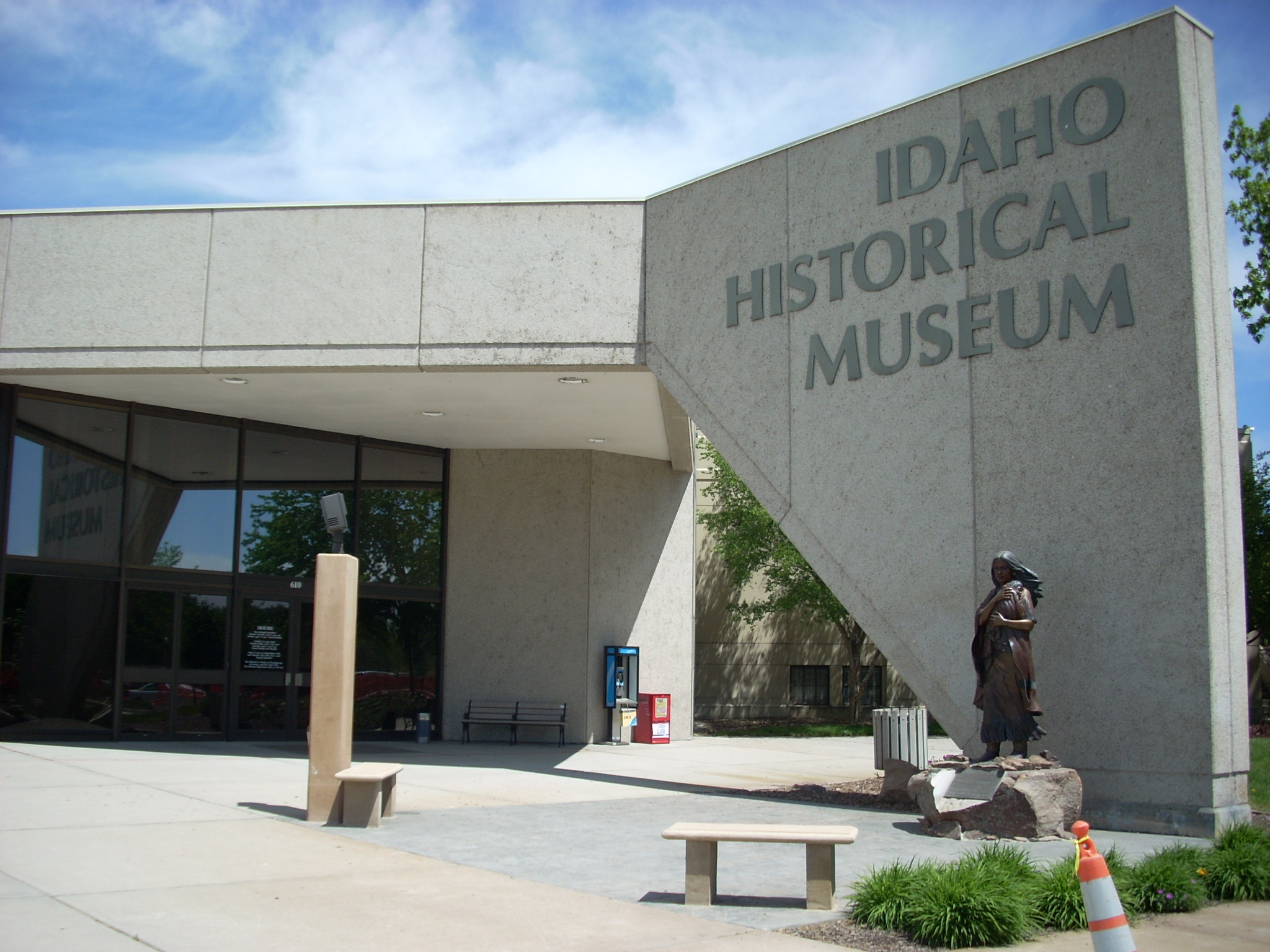
Idaho Historical Museum

According to a 2012 study performed by Americans for the Arts, arts, both public and private, in Boise is a forty-eight million dollar per year industry. The same study also cited the arts in and around Boise as a supplier of jobs for about 1600 people and producer of roughly $4.4 million in revenue to state and local government.

The Boise Centre on the Grove is an 85,000-square-foot (7,900 m^{2}) convention center that hosts a variety of events, including international, national, and regional conventions, conferences, banquets, and consumer shows. It is in the heart of downtown Boise and borders the Grove Plaza, which hosts many outdoor functions throughout the year including the New Year's Eve celebration, the Idaho Potato Drop hosted by the Idaho New Year's Commission. The Morrison-Knudsen Nature Center, located next to Municipal Park, features a streamwalk with wildlife experiences just east of downtown.

Boise has diverse and vibrant religious communities. The Jewish community is served by two synagogues: the Chabad Jewish Center, and the reform Ahavath Beth Israel Temple (completed 1896, is the nation's oldest continually used temple west of the Mississippi). The Church of Jesus Christ of Latter-day Saints dedicated a temple there in 1984. The first Christian Science Church in Boise, The First Church of Christ, Scientist, Boise, was built in 1898, with a new Church building built in 1989. The Boise Church is a branch of The Mother Church, The First Church of Christ, Scientist, in Boston, MA. The Catholic Diocese of Boise includes the entire state and is seated at St. John's Cathedral, completed in 1921. The Boise Hare Krishna Temple opened in August 1999.

Boise (along with Valley and Boise Counties) hosted the 2009 Special Olympics World Winter Games. More than 2,500 athletes from over 85 countries participated.

In 1972, John Waters set the final scene of his film Pink Flamingos in Boise.

The 1995 independent film Not This Part of the World was filmed in Boise.

Boise's sister city is Gernika, Spanish Basque Country.

=== Major attractions ===
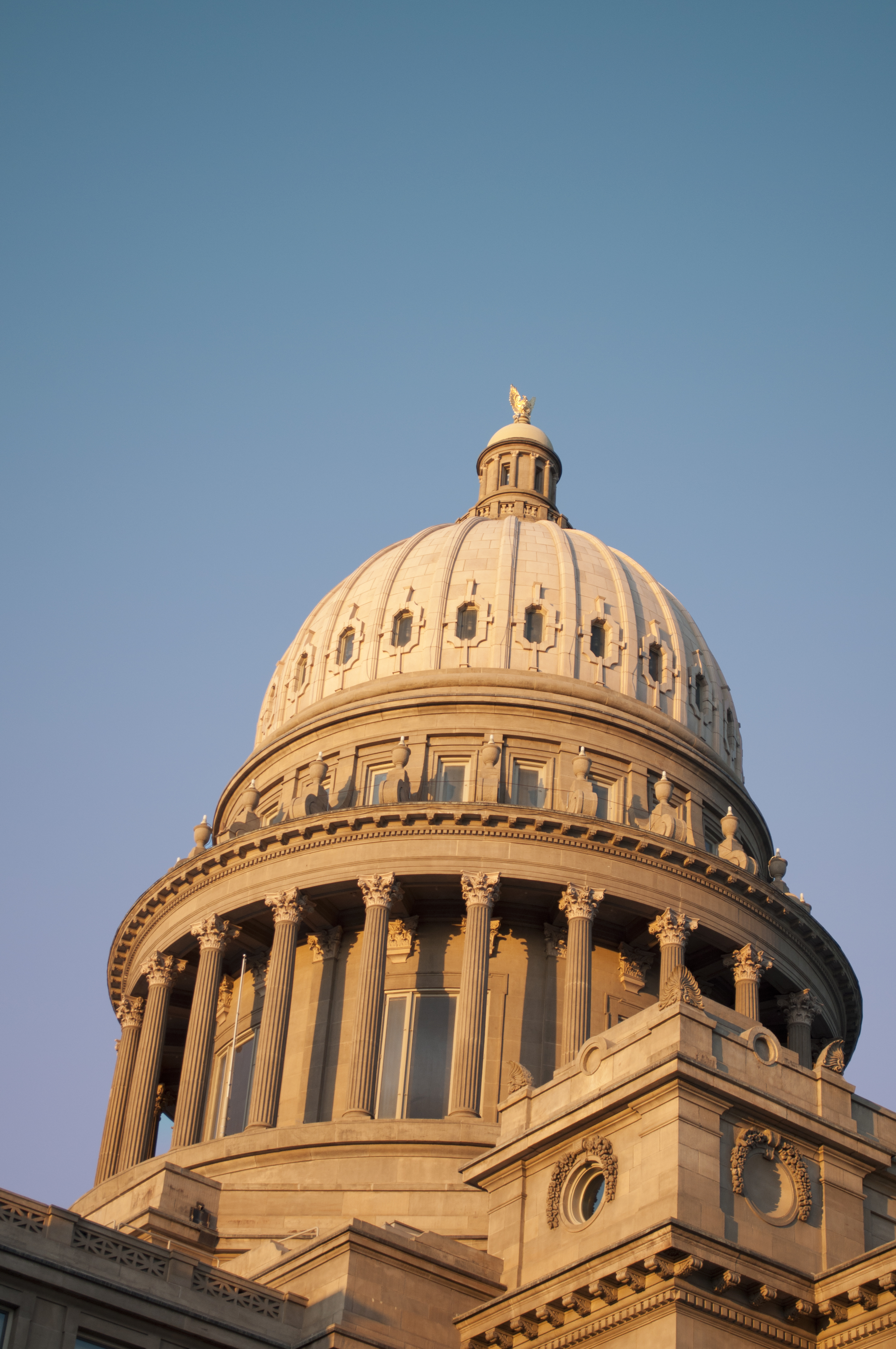
Capitol in July

Boise offers numerous recreational opportunities, including extensive hiking and biking in the foothills to the immediate north of downtown. Much of this trail network is part of Hull's Gulch and can be accessed by 8th street. An extensive urban trail system called the Boise River Greenbelt runs along the river and through Pierce Park. The Boise River is a common destination for fishing, swimming and rafting.

In Julia Davis Park is Zoo Boise, which has over 200 animals representing over 80 species from around the world. Its most recent exhibit, the Virginia R. Bartak Red Panda Passage, opened in May 2025. The city is also home to the Aquarium of Boise, a hands-on facility that houses over 250 species of animals and marine life.

The Bogus Basin ski area opened in 1942 and hosts multiple winter activities, primarily alpine skiing and snowboarding, but also cross-country skiing and snow tubing. "Bogus" is 16 mi (26 km) from the city limits (less than an hour drive from downtown) on a twisty paved road which climbs 3400 vertical feet (1036 m) through sagebrush and forest.

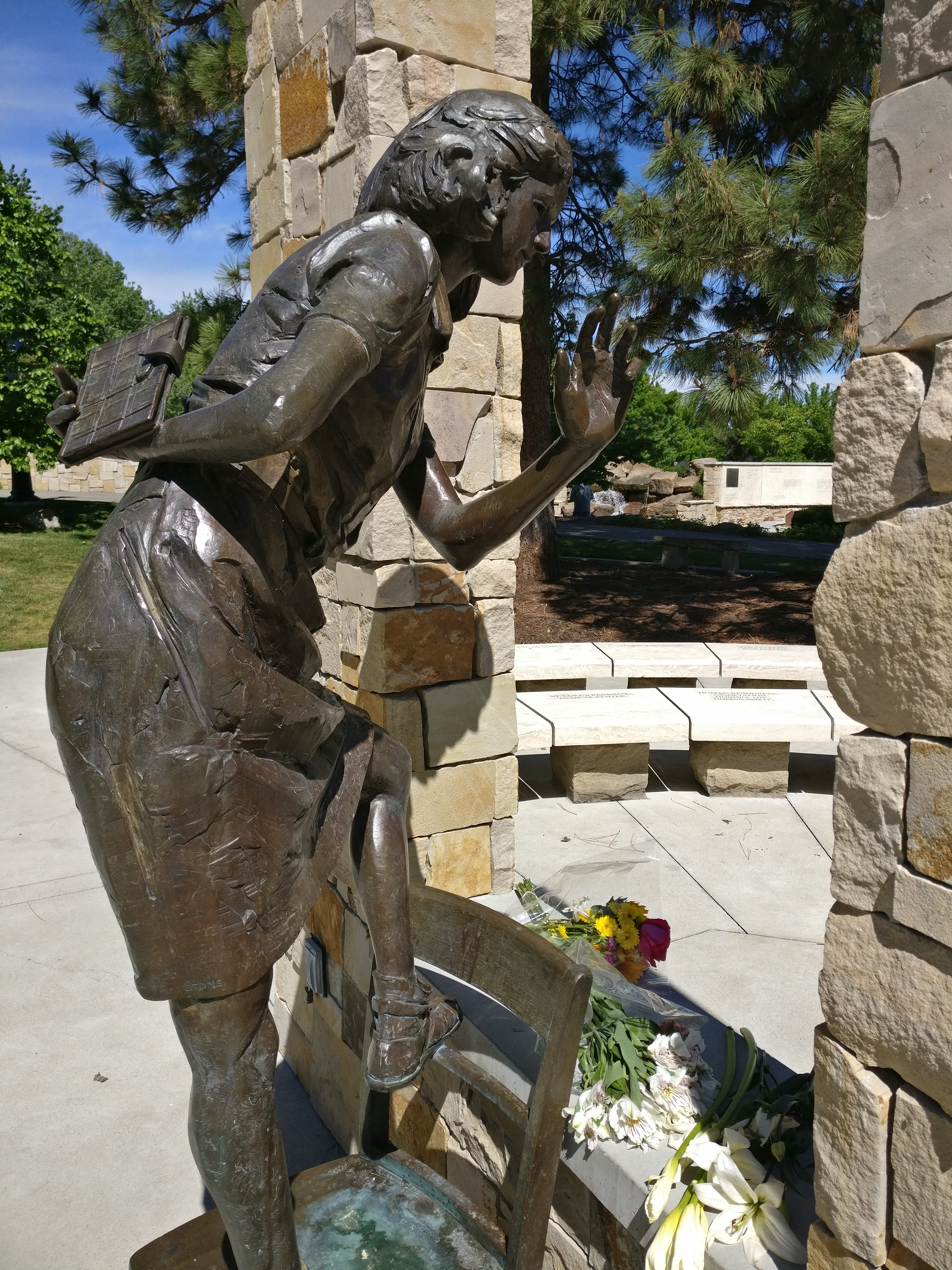
Anne Frank Human Rights Memorial

Boise is the site of the only human rights memorial in the U.S., the Anne Frank Human Rights Memorial, located next to its main library.

The World Center for Birds of Prey, just outside city, is a key part of the re-establishment of the peregrine falcon and its subsequent removal from the endangered species list. The center is breeding the rare California condor and the Aplomado Falcon, among many other rare and endangered species.

Publications such as Forbes, Fortune and Sunset have cited the city for its quality of life. An article published by Forbes in 2018 named Boise the fastest-growing city in America. In the wake of the pandemic, Boise was the fifth-fastest-growing city in the U.S. in 2022 and 2023. The metro area population of Boise in 2024 is 476,000, a 1.28% increase from 2023. Along with the population growth, the employment rate has grown 4.6% from 2012 to 2022.

The cornerstone mall in Boise, Boise Towne Square Mall, is also a major shopping attraction for Boise, Nampa, Caldwell, and surrounding areas. The mall received upgrades and added several new retailers in 1998 and 2006. Home prices, a proxy for wealth, increased 11.58%--number four in the U.S.

The state's largest giant sequoia, grown from a seedling that was a gift from the naturalist John Muir, was on the grounds of St. Luke's Medical Center until 2017 and now can be found in Fort Boise Park, to which it was moved over a four-day period that year.

=== Sports ===
Boise has several professional sports teams who play in minor leagues. These include AC Boise of USL League One in soccer, the Boise Hawks of the independent baseball Pioneer League and the Idaho Steelheads of the ECHL (minor league hockey). The Treasure Valley Spartans (semi-pro football) of the (Rocky Mountain Football League) operated from 2009 to 2012. An arenafootball2 franchise, the Boise Burn, began play in 2007 but folded after the 2009 season. Athletic Club Boise was established in 2024 and played their first season in the men's USL League One in 2026. The team plays at the Stadium at Expo Idaho, which seats 7,247 spectators and is planned to be expanded to 10,000 in 2027 after AC Idaho moves to the USL Championship, the second tier of American men's soccer. A women's team in the USL Super League is planned to begin play in 2028.

Boise is home to an all-female, DIY, flat track roller derby league, the Treasure Valley Rollergirls, which beginning on Labor Day Weekend 2010 hosted an international, two-day, double elimination tournament, the first Spudtown Knockdown, featuring eight teams from throughout the American West and Canada.

The Boise State University campus is home to Albertsons Stadium, a 36,800-seat outdoor football stadium known for its blue playing surface, currently FieldTurf, and ExtraMile Arena, a 12,000-seat basketball and entertainment venue which opened in 1982 as the BSU Pavilion. Boise State University is known primarily for the recent successes of its football team.

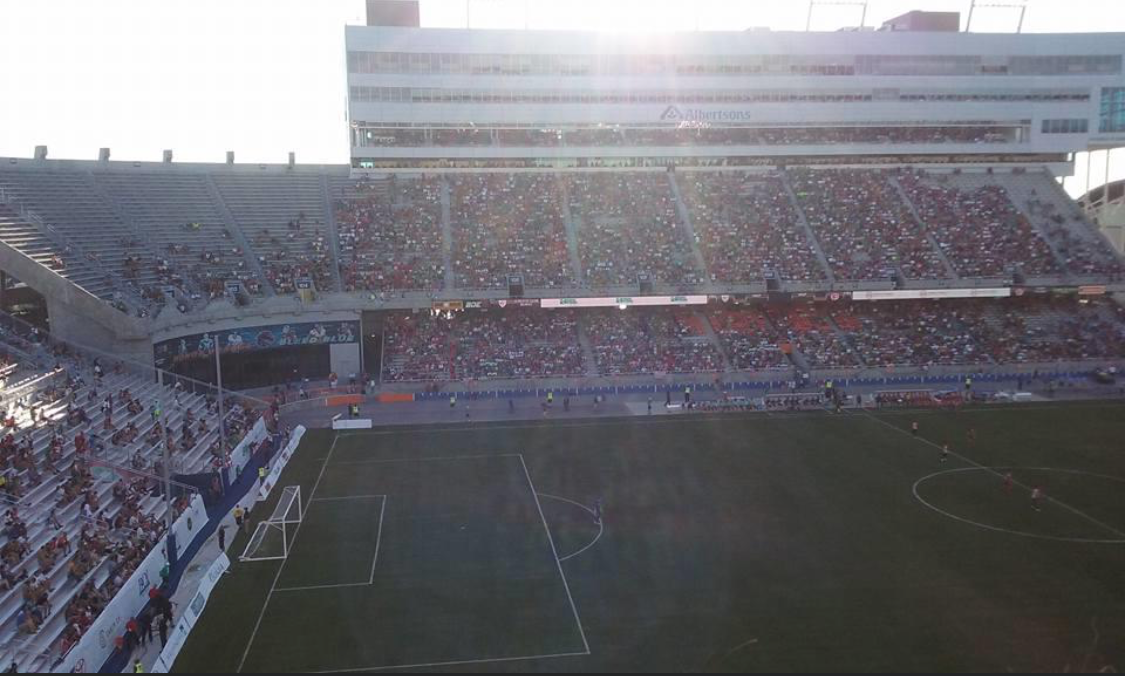
An international club soccer friendly match hosted at Albertsons Stadium in July 2015

The Famous Idaho Potato Bowl football game (formerly known as the Humanitarian Bowl and the MPC Computers Bowl) is held in late December each year, and pairs a team from the Mountain West Conference with a Mid-American Conference team.

Club	League	Sport	Venue	Established	Championships
Boise Hawks	Pioneer League	Baseball	Memorial Stadium	1987	6
Idaho Steelheads	ECHL	Ice hockey	Idaho Central Arena	1997	2
Athletic Club Boise	USL League One	Soccer	Stadium at Expo Idaho	2024	0

== Policing and crime ==
In 1864, John Ward became the first law enforcement Marshal in the newly formed city of Boise. The Boise Police Department was inaugurated in 1903; at the time it consisted of a chief of police, a police sergeant, and seven police officers. The Boise City Police Department now employs just over 400 people, with 325 allocated positions for sworn officers and 82 civilians.

For 2020, Boise Police reported four murders, 147 rapes, 210 sexual assaults, 56 robberies, 380 aggravated assaults, 1465 cases of assault/battery, 479 burglaries, 3164 thefts, 292 motor vehicle thefts, and 35 robberies. Total crimes have decreased overall between 2016 and 2020. Over the same time, rapes and sexual assaults have trended upwards while assault/battery, burglary, theft, and vandalism have trended downwards.

== Education ==
The Boise School District, which includes the majority of the city, includes 31 elementary schools, eight junior high schools, five high schools, and two specialty schools. Part of the West Ada School District is within the Boise city limits, and the city is therefore home to six public high schools: Boise, Borah, Capital, Timberline, the alternative Frank Church, and the West Ada School district's Centennial. Boise's private schools include the Catholic Bishop Kelly, Foothills School of Arts and Sciences, the International Baccalaureate-accredited Riverstone International School, and the only student-led school in the country, One Stone.

Post-secondary educational options in Boise include Boise State University (BSU) and a wide range of technical schools. The University of Idaho and Idaho State University each maintain a satellite campus in Boise. As of 2025, the only law school in Boise is the Boise campus of the University of Idaho College of Law (Concordia University School of Law previously operated from 2012-2020). Boise is home to Boise Bible College, an undergraduate degree-granting college that exists to train leaders for churches as well as missionaries for the world.

Carrington College, a for-profit institution, maintains a campus in Boise. The school offers four health-related programs including nursing and dental support.

Boiseko Ikastola is the only Basque preschool outside of the Basque Country.

== Media ==
The greater Boise area is served by daily newspaper the Idaho Press, triweekly newspaper the Idaho Statesman, the free alternative news weekly the Boise Weekly, the weekly business news publication Idaho Business Review, and a quarterly lifestyle magazine, Boise Magazine.

In addition to numerous radio stations, Boise has five major commercial television stations that serve the greater Boise area. The major television stations include KBOI-TV 2 (CBS, with The CW, via low-powered KYUU-LD, on DT2), KAID 4 (PBS), KIVI-TV 6 (ABC), KTVB 7 (NBC) and KNIN-TV 9 (Fox) and Boise State Television.

== Transportation ==
The major highway serving Boise is Interstate 84, which connects Boise with Portland, Oregon, and Salt Lake City, Utah. A spur route, Interstate 184 (locally known as "The Connector"), travels 5 miles (8 km) from I-84 to downtown Boise. Highway 55 branches outward northeast. There is a network of bike paths, such as the Boise River Greenbelt, throughout the city and surrounding region.

Public transportation within Boise and to surrounding cities is operated by Valley Regional Transit, also known as ValleyRide. It runs bus routes from Main Street Station, an underground hub that opened in 2016 near North 8th Street. The city government has proposed the construction of a streetcar line in Downtown Boise several times, most recently in 2017 to connect to the Boise State University campus. A commuter rail line between Caldwell in Boise, connecting areas of the Treasure Valley using existing freight tracks, has been proposed by local officials. A 2025 study commissioned by the Community Planning Association of Southwest Idaho found that a system with trains every 15 minutes at peak periods and hourly during the day would carry 24,000 daily passengers and cost from $1.5 billion to $2.5 billion to construct.

Commercial air service is provided at the Boise Airport, which opened in 1936 and is also used by the Idaho Air National Guard. The terminal was renovated in stages between 2001 and 2005 to accommodate the growing number of passengers flying in and out of Boise. It is served by Allegiant Air, Alaska Airlines, American Airlines, Avelo Airlines, Delta Air Lines, Frontier Airlines, Southwest Airlines, and United Airlines. The airport's east end is home to the National Interagency Fire Center.

The Seattle–Chicago Amtrak Pioneer passenger train stopped at Boise Union Pacific Depot from June 7, 1977, until May 10, 1997, when it was discontinued. A short line railroad (Boise Valley Railroad) serves industries in Boise, connecting with the Union Pacific Railroad in Nampa.

== Sister cities ==
- Gernika, Basque Country, Spain
- Syracuse, New York, United States

== See also ==
- List of parks in Boise
- USS Boise, 2 ships
