= USS Boise =

Two ships of the United States Navy have borne the name Boise, after Boise, Idaho.

- USS Boise (CL-47), was a light cruiser commissioned in 1938. The ship was later sold to Argentina.
- USS Boise (SSN-764), is a Los Angeles-class nuclear attack submarine.
