= Boise Public Library =

Public library system in Idaho, United States

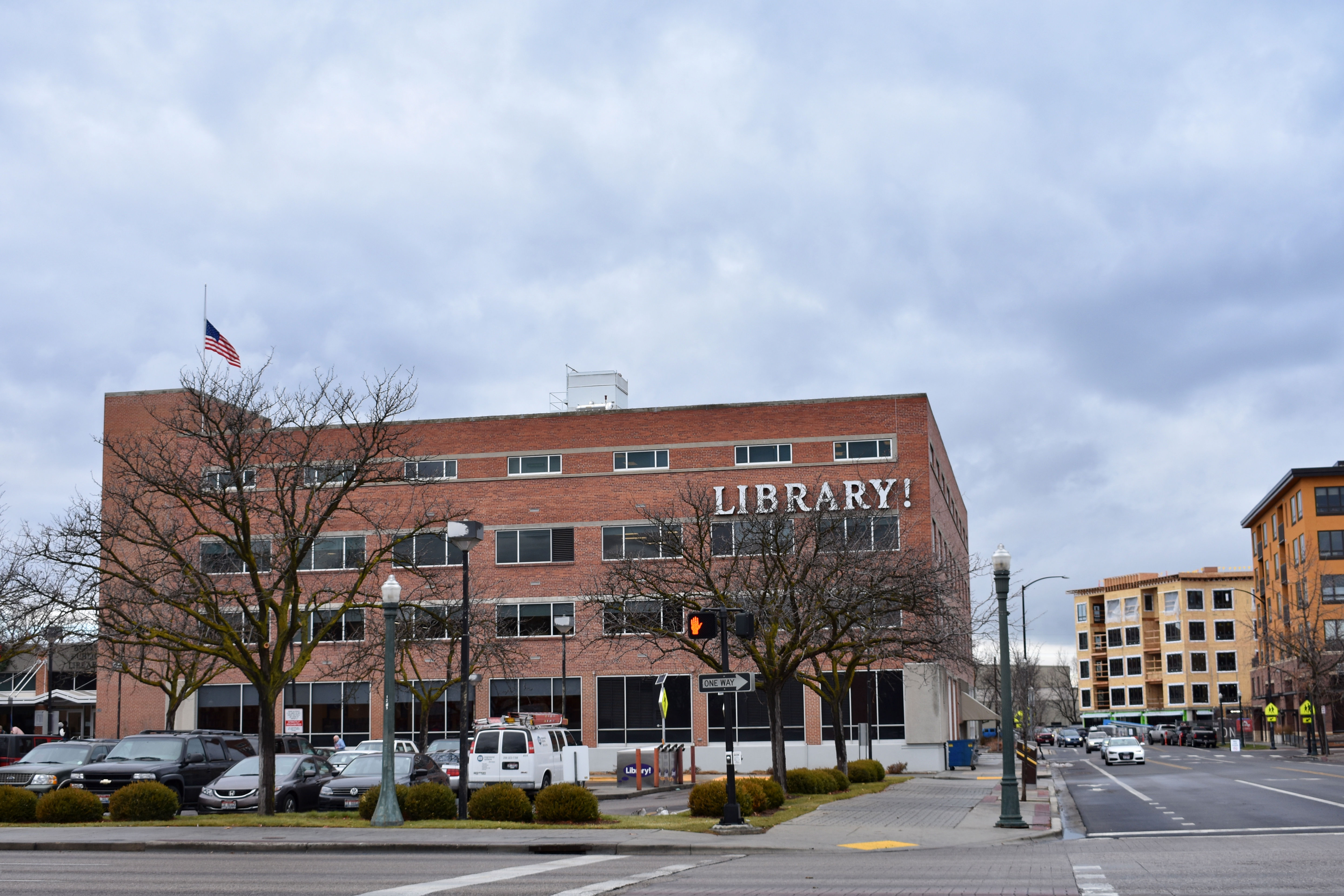
- The main library in 2018
- 43.610631°N 116.2077237°W
- Location: 715 S Capitol Boulevard; Boise, Idaho
- Established: 18 February 1895
- Branches: 4

Other information
- Parent organization: City of Boise
- Website: www.boisepubliclibrary.org

The Boise Public Library is a public library system in Boise, Idaho, that includes a main library at 715 South Capitol Boulevard and four branch libraries within the city.

== History ==
=== Territorial Library ===
In 1863 the Idaho Territory was created with Lewiston as the capitol, and when the capitol was moved to Boise City in 1866, the Territorial Library was relocated to Boise City with "2000 pounds of books" from Lewiston. Although not a public library, the Territorial Library served as a venue for public meetings at its location in the 3-room Curtis building, also known as the "Stone Jug," until the library was moved in 1872. The Curtis building was demolished in 1899 when the Rocky Mountain Bell Telephone Building was constructed at 609 Main Street. Still not considered a public library, the Territorial Library continued as a public meeting space after 1872, and Boise's Board of Trade was organized at the library in 1883.

=== Misener & Lamkin ===
The firm of Misener & Lamkin operated a circulating library in Boise City in the 1860s. The firm, later known as Brown & Lamkin and then as H.H. Lamkin, managed the library from a bookstore at the Boise City post office. And a library operated at Fort Boise as early as 1867, but it was not a public library.

=== Bennett Committee ===
In 1874 a committee headed by territorial governor Thomas W. Bennett discussed plans for establishing a university at Boise City, and the committee recommended a free library open both to students and to the public. Centers of higher education in Idaho were later founded in Moscow (1889), in Caldwell (1891), and in Pocatello (1901), but the Bennett committee was unable to establish neither a university nor a free library in Boise City.

=== Firemen's reading room ===
In 1882 the Idaho Statesman reported that "a movement is on foot to establish a library and literary association in this city," and in 1883 a free library again was in planning, including a plan for $10,000 in capital stock. By 1886 a reading room had been created in the Boise City firehouse, also the location of City Hall, and by 1887 the reading room was billed as the only public library in Idaho. By 1890 the library was under management of the "ladies of Boise." In that year the friends of the library began a fundraising campaign to raise $100 per month for acquisitions to the library. In 1894 the firehouse library requested that all circulating books be returned.

=== Columbian Club ===
The library came under the management of the Columbian Club, also known as the Columbian Exposition Club, a women's club established in May, 1892, to advance the interests of Idaho during the World's Columbian Exposition in Chicago. The Columbian Club in 1893 requested space for the library in the new City Hall (1893), and late in 1894 the request was granted by the Boise City Council. When the library opened in 1895, it included furniture formerly on display in the Woman's Room in the Idaho Building at the Columbian Exposition in 1893. The club also hired its first librarian, Ella Reed, in 1895, and in that year the library catalog included 982 books. In 1896 the library counted 12,358 visitors.

=== Traveling library ===
The Columbian Club began a traveling library in 1899, and in 1900 the club managed 15 traveling libraries that served regional communities and mining camps. Early in 1901, the Idaho legislature passed a traveling library bill, informally known as the "Columbian Club Bill," to promote free public libraries and to establish a state library commission.

=== Library! ===
In 1994, Howard Olivier, owner of the local Flying Pie Pizza, contacted the Boise Public Library. In an effort to rejuvenate the library, Olivier met with officials to propose a new addition to the library’s name. He suggested adding an exclamation point to the end of the name. With permission from the local government and funding from Olivier himself, the library became ‘Library!’. Despite some push back, new signs reading Library! were unveiled at the downtown library in January 1995.

== Carnegie library ==
In 1902 the Idaho State Library Commission requested from Andrew Carnegie that he establish a Carnegie library in Boise. Carnegie agreed to donate $25,000 toward a library if the city provided matching funds, yearly maintenance funds of $2500, and property for a building site. Voters approved a $25,000 bond levy that year, and the city purchased land on Washington Street between 8th and 9th Streets from the Independent School District at a cost of $4000. The site was the location of Pioneer School (1868-1905), built by early residents of Boise City, and the schoolhouse was demolished when the library building was nearing completion. The city council established a board of trustees to oversee the library, and library management passed from the Columbian Club to the city, although the club continued to donate books and materials to the library and to raise money to furnish the new library.

Carnegie reduced his gift offer to $15,000 in 1903 when documents he received from the Columbian Club seemed to inflate the local population to 10,000 residents, not 5900 as reported in the 1900 census. Carnegie later revised his gift offer again to $20,000. The 1903 Polk City Directory estimated the local population at 12,256 residents, not including the population of South Boise. In 1905 Carnegie reconsidered his reduction of library funding, and he added $5000 to the amount of his gift.

Boise's Carnegie library was designed by Tourtellotte & Co. and built by local contractors Michels & Weber in 1904. Dedication of the building occurred May 3, 1905, and the library opened to the public June 22, 1905. By 1964 the library had outgrown its 11,000 square feet of floor space at the Carnegie library.

In the early 1970s, options for the Carnegie building included demolition and use as a senior center, but in 1972 the building was sold at auction to Hon Investment Co. and later converted to office space. The building was added to the National Register of Historic Places in 1974.

== Main library ==
Voters rejected bond measures for construction of a new library, once in 1967 and again in 1969, but a measure to purchase and remodel a warehouse was approved in 1971. The building had been occupied by the Salt Lake Hardware Co. since its completion in 1946, and it contained over 64,000 square feet of floor space. After renovation of the building, the main library opened in 1973 at 715 S Capitol Blvd.

The main library floor space was designed to serve a population of 75,000 residents, and to reduce demand at the main library, the city opened branch libraries beginning in 2008, when the population well exceeded 200,000 and the main library had outgrown its building.

== New main library ==
Plans for a new main library to be built on the current library's existing site were drawn by architect Moshe Safdie in 2018 with a budget of $50–60 million. Safdie's building design, which was nearly identical to the Salt Lake City (Utah) library he designed, would cost $80 million and quickly ballooned to approximately $104 million before a spadeful of earth had been turned. The building was to be divided into three areas: A library with 110,000 square feet of floor space, an event space, and offices for Boise City Department of Arts and History. Groundbreaking was expected in 2019 with an ambitious opening planned for 2021-22.

This proposed library/civic center was suspended by the citizens due to several issues: (1) Concerns with the cost and the method of funding, which included various combinations of City revenues, including using Reserve funds, urban renewal district funds, lease financing with high issuance costs and interest charges, and private philanthropy; (2) Lack of broad citizen input from across the entire City limits; (3) Concerns with why the City was not using the adjacent land parcel that had specifically been purchased for future library expansion; and (4) The collateral damage of relocating “The Cabin” – a New Deal – era historic log cabin constructed by the Civilian Conservation Corps in 1939 – 40, which has become an iconic downtown structure.

A small group of citizens from across the City formed Boise Working Together, a 501(c)3 nonprofit corporation. This group successfully drafted, circulated, and gained ballot status for two citizen initiatives requiring public votes on future library and sports park projects in Boise. Their passage by 69.1 and 75.2 percent of the voters, respectively, brought a greater measure of oversight to methods of financing that were designed to circumvent a public vote on bond issues, as well as to the overall tax burden that such large civic projects would cause to average citizens. In the future, any public library that will exceed the cost of $25 million must be put forth for a vote by the people.

== Branch libraries ==
- Collister (2008)
- Hillcrest (2008)
- Cole & Ustick (2009)
- Bown Crossing (2017)

== See also ==
- Idaho State Forester's Building
- Downtown Boise
