= One Stone (nonprofit) =

Non-profit organization for student leadership

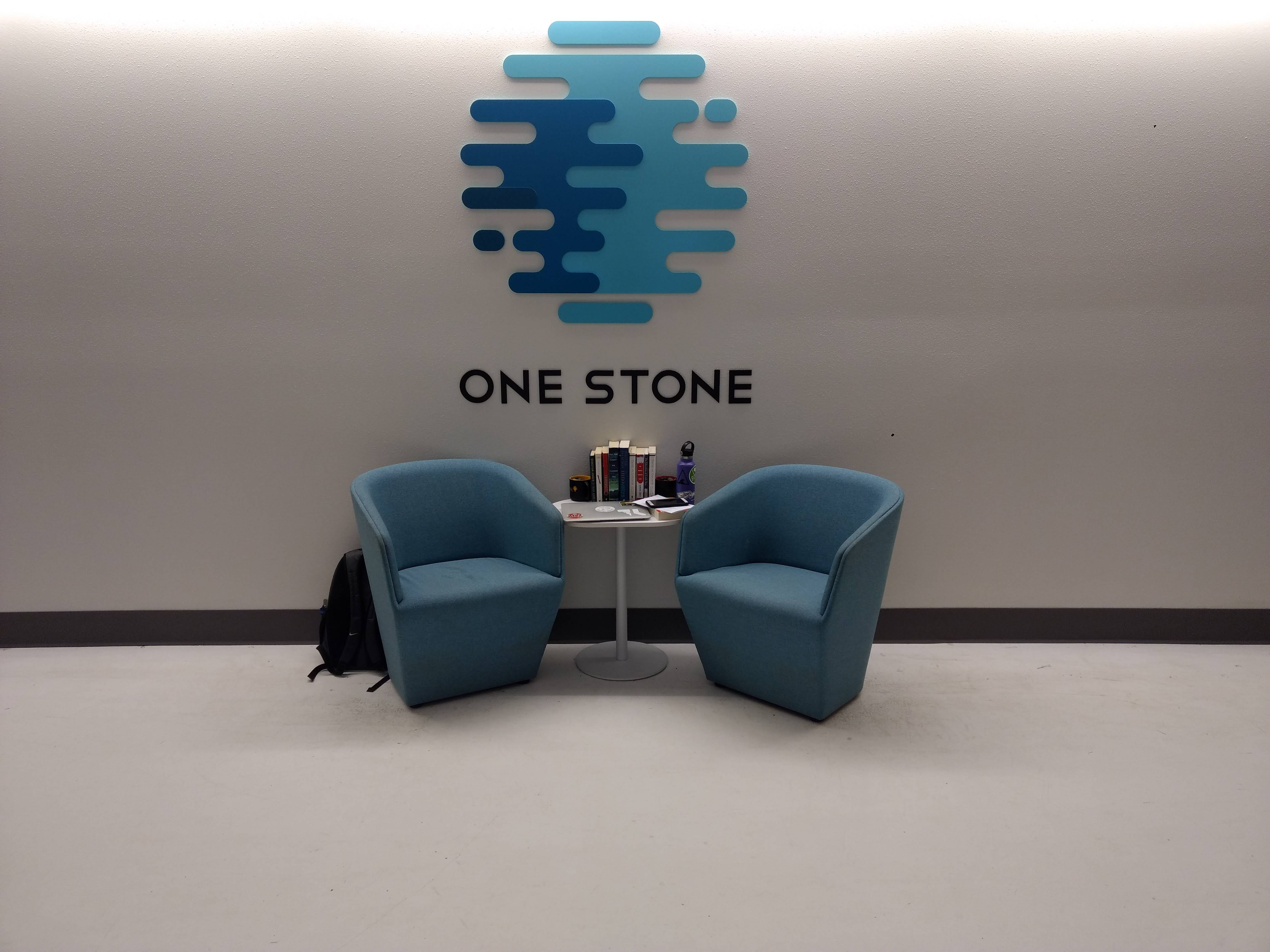
- One Stone
- Formation: 2008; 18 years ago
- Founder: Teresa Poppen, Joel Poppen
- Legal status: 501(c)(3) nonprofit organization
- Purpose: Forging an army of good for good
- Headquarters: Boise, Idaho, United States
- Chairperson: Nora Smart
- Executive Director: Celeste Bolin
- Board of directors: For current directors see here
- Subsidiaries: List of subsidiaries Two Birds; Solution Lab; Project Good; One Stone Lab51
- Employees: 27 (2019)
- Volunteers: 200 (2019)
- Students: 130 (2019)
- Website: www.onestone.org

One Stone is a nonprofit organization that promotes student voice and student leadership based in Boise, Idaho. Their stated mission is "Making students better leaders and the world a better place." They use the design thinking approach, pioneered at Stanford's Hasso Plattner Institute of Design, throughout their organization.

== History ==
Teresa and Joel Poppen founded One Stone in 2008. In 2015, One Stone received part of a $24.5 million dollar grant from the J.A. & Kathryn Albertson Family Foundation. The following year, One Stone received an additional $2.1 million of a $32 million total grant from the foundation.

== Overview ==
Two-thirds of One Stone's board of directors are students as mandated by the organization's bylaws.

=== Two Birds ===
Two Birds is a student-led and operated creative design and marketing agency. Past clients include Albertsons, The Cabin, HQPBL, WASHTO, and various internal One Stone projects. Students in the Two Birds program work with clients using the design thinking process to develop logos, marketing strategies, websites, and other ventures. In 2018, Two Birds acquired Jason Sievers as Creative Director from advertising agency DaviesMoore.

=== Project Good ===
Project Good is a community service program at One Stone that uses the design thinking process.

=== Hatch ===
Hatch is a business incubator for student developed businesses.

=== Lab School ===
One Stone operates an independent high school consisting of roughly 125 students in the four-year program as of the fall of 2019. The first class started in the fall of 2016 and graduated in 2019. For its first six years, the school charged no tuition. With the Albertson grant sunsetting, the school decided to begin charging tuition on a sliding scale based on each family’s ability to pay. The program is different from traditional school, as it has no grades, opting for a portfolio and narrative transcript evaluation instead. Instead of teachers, the school has coaches, which support student-driven learning. In the spring of 2019, One Stone had 17 coaches, with 7 master's degrees and 4 doctoral degrees between them.

During the college application process in Spring 2023, One Stone students were accepted into 83.8% of colleges applied to. Across the 37 students of the class of 2023, graduates earned $2 million in projected four-year merit scholarships.

== In the media ==
In 2019, One Stone was featured in a documentary by filmmaker Jon Long, called Rise: Voice of a New Generation. Long has produced documentaries for Disney, PBS, and National Geographic.
