= Boiseko Ikastola =

Location
- 1955 Broadway Avenue; Boise, Idaho 83706

Information
- Established: 1998
- Language: Basque
- Website: https://www.boisekoikastola.org/

Boiseko Ikastola is a language immersion preschool located in Boise, Idaho, United States. It is one of the few schools outside the Basque country to teach the Basque language.

Boiseko Ikastola has a curriculum that focuses on the acquisition of the Basque language, and on the development of reading, writing, and mathematics. The classes are designed for Basque and American children, all the subjects are taught in Basque language, which facilitates the learning of young students. Research has shown that exposing children to a second language at an early age gives them an advantage later in life in areas such as math, language and cultural awareness. With a variety of excursions, dance classes and activities, the school offers cultural learning beyond the classroom.

The school was originally established in 1998 by a group of families and was held at the St. Paul's Catholic Student Center at Boise State University. In 2015, it moved to a brick house on Broadway Avenue purchased by the Basque Museum and Cultural Center. It has also received grants from the Basque government. It is a Basque language immersion school, aiming to preserve the language schools of preschoolers, and serving the children of both immigrants form the Basque country and of American-born children of whatever ancestry.

The school is one of several institutions and cultural programs in Boise that preserve and celebrate the culture of the area's large community of Basque immigrants and their descendants.
