= Healthwise =

Pharmaceutical company

Healthwise Inc.
- Industry: Healthcare
- Predecessor: Health Systems Incorporated
- Founded: 1975 in Boise, Idaho
- Founder: Don Kemper
- Headquarters: Boise, Idaho, United States
- Area served: United States
- Key people: Dr. Adam Husney (CEO)
- Revenue: US$ 39,000,000 (2015)
- Number of employees: 270
- Website: healthwise.org

Healthwise is a non-profit company founded in 1975 that develops health content and patient education for health insurance companies, care management companies, hospitals, and consumer health web sites.

== History ==
Healthwise was founded in Boise, Idaho, in 1975 by Don Kemper, based on his previous work at Health Systems Incorporated (HSI), a project of the National Center for Health Services Research. In 2014, the Informed Medical Decisions Foundation was taken over by Healthwise and became a subsidiary. In 2016, Kemper retired from Healthwise and Bob Kyte took over as CEO. In Fall of 2018, Healthwise named then Chief Medical Officer Dr. Adam Husney as CEO.

On February 29, 2024, Healthwise was acquired by WebMD.

== Services ==
In the beginning, Healthwise offered printed decision-support and self-care materials for patients. It also publishes the Healthwise Handbook, a handbook with plain-language information and prevention tips on 190 common health problems, which is periodically updated and contains physician-approved guidelines on if and when to call a doctor for the problems it covers. The guidebook was distributed for free with the help of a $2.1m grant by the Robert Wood Johnson Foundation to 125,000 households in Idaho; as a result, 39% of recipients reported that the handbook helped them avoid a visit to a doctor. Additionally, according to the Blue Cross of Idaho visits to the emergency room by owners of the guide went down by 18%.

Parts of the Healthwise Handbook were replicated in the United Kingdom, Canada, New Zealand, Australia and South Africa; in British Columbia, the handbook was distributed to all households. The handbook was also translated into Spanish and a specialized version for older adults has been released as well.

According to a study by the Partners Health Initiative in Anderson, South Carolina, which had supplied 154,000 families with Healthwise information, 23% reported that it saved them an unnecessary trip to the doctor and 13% reported that it prevented an unnecessary trip to the emergency room, with underinsured and uninsured families being the most avid users.

In the mid-1990s, the company created an online resource for health information, the Healthwise Knowledgebase. The Knowledgebase features interactive health content and decision support tools and Healthwise requires that all content is evidence-based and reviewed by experts before publication. Content of the Knowledgebase is used for self-diagnostic services such as WebMD as well as websites of hospitals and health-plan providers.
