= Boise Centre =

Convention center in Boise, Idaho

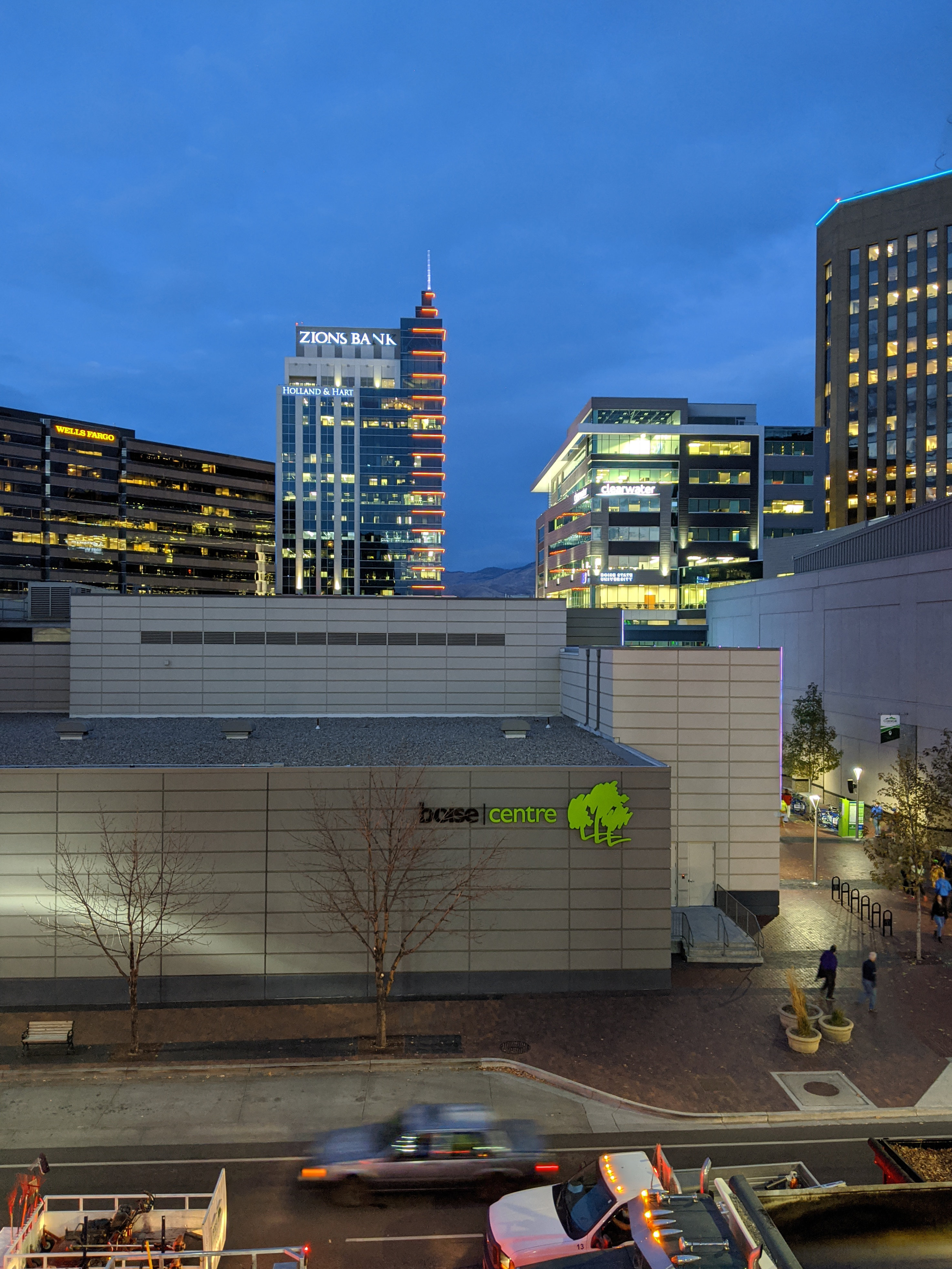
- Boise Centre (foreground) in November 2019
- Interactive map of Boise Centre
- Location: 850 W Front Street, Boise, Idaho 83702
- Coordinates: 43°36′53″N 116°12′26″W
- Owner: Greater Boise Auditorium District

Construction
- Opened: January 1990

Website
- boisecentre.com

Boise Centre is Idaho's largest convention center and is located in downtown Boise. The centre offers 86,000 square feet of flexible meeting and event space. The center is able to accommodate groups from 10 to 2,000. A concourse expansion was completed in 2017.

Boise Centre is an operating entity of the Greater Boise Auditorium District.
