= ClickBank =

Affiliate marketing program

- Company type: Private
- Industry: Affiliate marketing, e-commerce
- Founded: 1998
- Founder: Tim and Eileen Barber
- Headquarters: Boise, Idaho, United States
- Website: www.clickbank.com

ClickBank is a global e-commerce platform and affiliate marketplace founded in 1998. The company has more than six million clients worldwide, making it the 87th largest Internet retailer in North America.

ClickBank is an e-commerce platform for physical and digital products, digital content creators (also known as sellers) and affiliate marketers, who then promote them to consumers.

In 2011, it offered over 46,000 individual products to its affiliate marketers. It has annual turnover of $1 Billion USD.
