= Boise River Greenbelt =

Urban trail system in Boise, Idaho, United States

Coordinates: 43.612357°N 116.216147°W

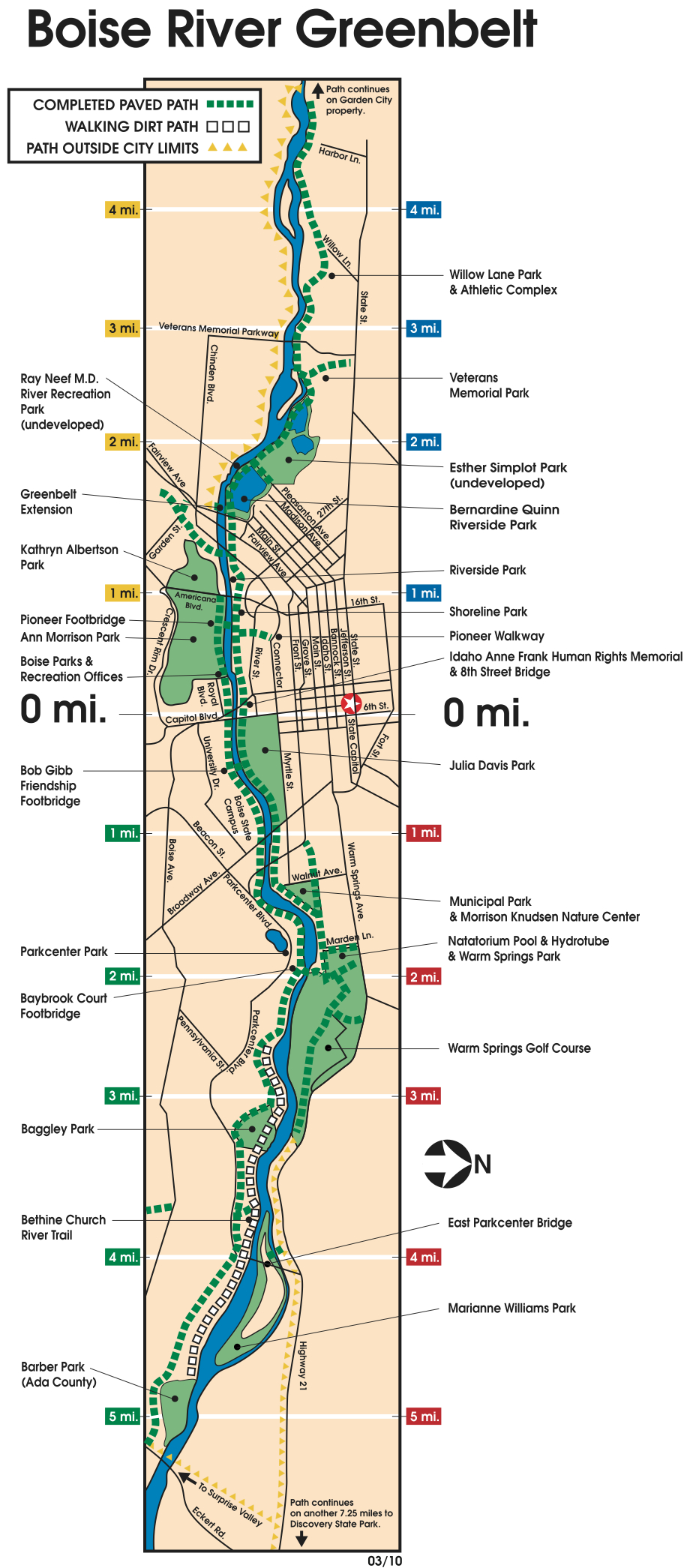
Map of the Boise River Greenbelt within Boise.

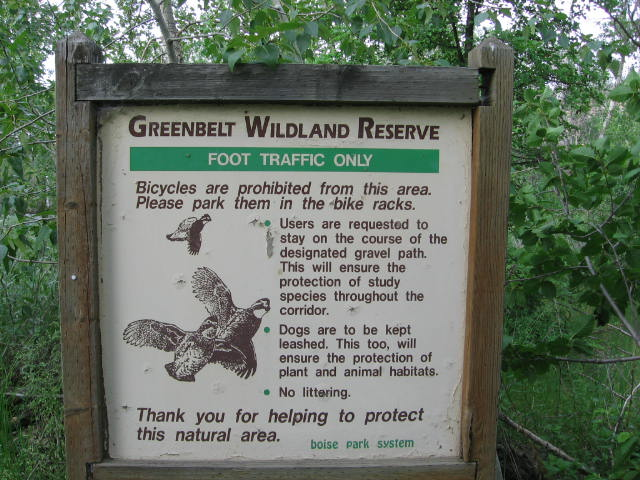
Several wildlife preserves are incorporated within the Boise Greenbelt

The Boise River Greenbelt is a recreational and alternate transportation trail along the banks of the Boise River through Boise, Idaho, United States. The Boise Greenbelt is more of a greenway than a green belt since its character is linear. It extends more than 20 miles (32 km) beginning at Lucky Peak Dam in the east to a short distance beyond Eagle Road (Idaho State Highway 55) in the west in Eagle, Idaho. Taking into account both sides of the river and other parallel trails and spurs, the total Greenbelt trail system measures more than 30 miles (48 km).

The Greenbelt connects Boise's riverside parks and connects Boise with neighboring municipalities. The majority of the Greenbelt is paved with asphalt or concrete on both sides of the river. However some sections are unpaved and bicycles may be prohibited on some unpaved sections. Where this occurs, bicycles have alternate routes on residential streets or dedicated bike paths. Motorized vehicles are prohibited on all parts of the Greenbelt. Segways are allowed on the Greenbelt in the City of Boise providing a special permit has been obtained.

== History ==
In 1962, the City of Boise hired a consultant, Atkinson & Associates, to create Boise's first comprehensive plan. The plan suggested the city should acquire land along the Boise River to create a continuous "green belt" of public lands stretching the entire length of the community. A local grassroots effort to clean up the waterway and create public access to the river corridor began to take hold. This vision caught on, and by 1967 three small parcels of land were donated to the city to launch the "green belt."

In 1968, with public interest and support growing, the first Greenbelt Plan and Guidelines were adopted by the Board of Parks Commissioners. A Greenbelt and Pathways Committee was appointed in 1969 to guide the City of Boise as it worked to develop the Greenbelt, and in 1971 the first Greenbelt Ordinance was adopted which required a minimum setback of 70 feet (21 m) for all structures and parking areas. The City of Boise continued to slowly piece together a patchwork of land along the corridor using several methods of acquisition including purchase, exchange, leasing and receiving donations of property by individuals, civic groups and corporations.

== Points of interest ==
=== North Bank, from east to west ===
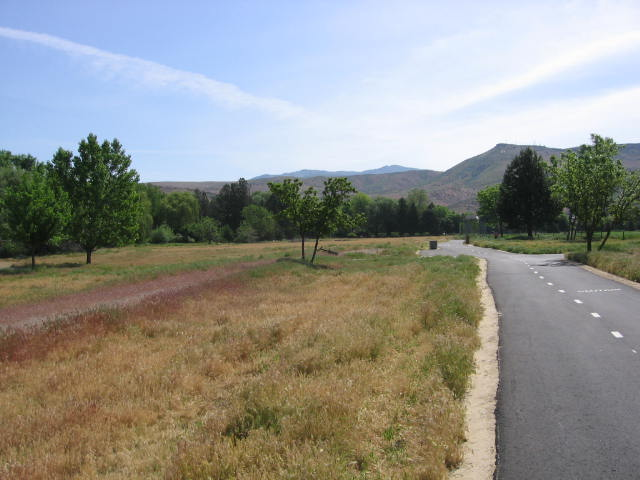
Approaching Warm Springs Golf Course and Kristin Armstrong Municipal Park, NE 2.1; Table Rock is in the background

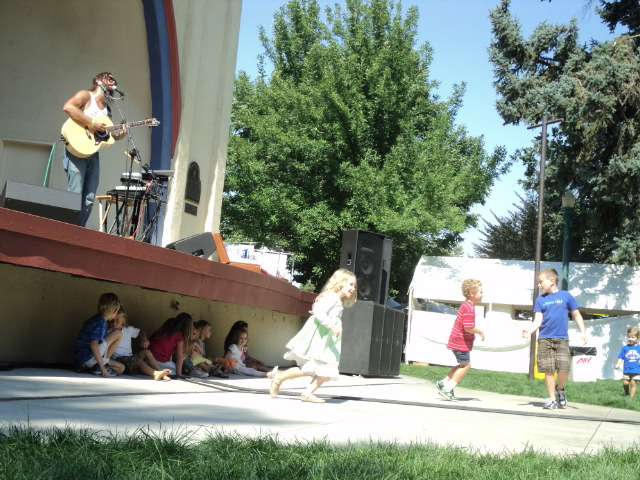
Local musician James Orr performs at the 57th Annual Art in the Park in Julia Davis Park at the Gene Harris Bandshell

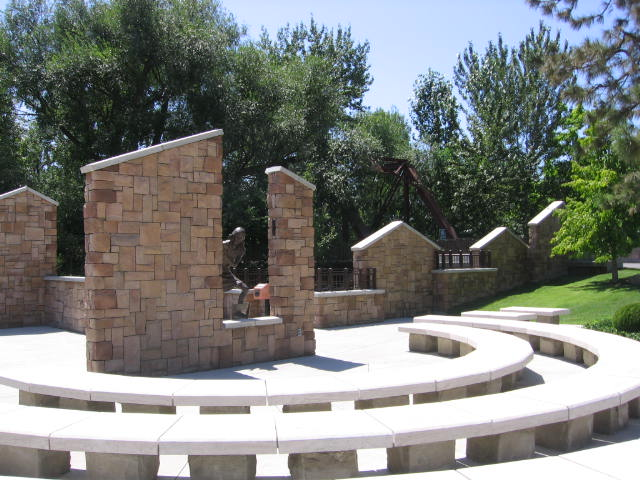
The Idaho Anne Frank Human Rights Memorial by the Boise Public Library at N 0.0

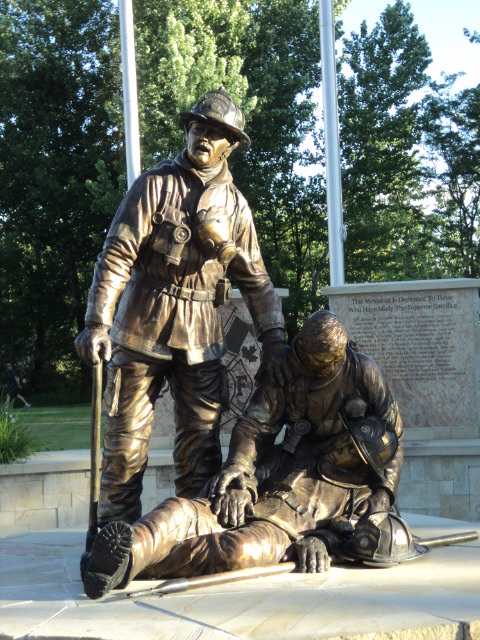
Fallen Firefighter Memorial at NW 1.0

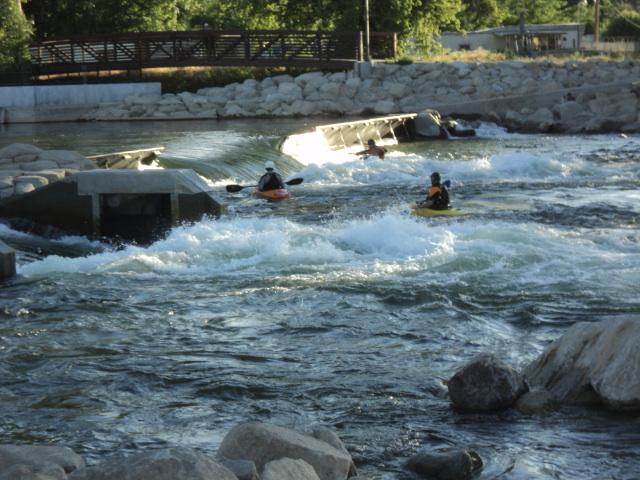
Artificial white water near NW 1.9

- Lucky Peak Dam
- Lucky Peak State Park
- Boise River Diversion Dam (New York Canal)
- State Highway 21 Bridge
- Idaho Shakespeare Festival
- Eckert Road spur and bridge to Barber Park
- Marianne Williams Park
- East Parkcenter Boulevard Bridge
- Warm Springs Golf Course
- Marden Pedestrian Bridge (Baybrook Court)
- Kristin Armstrong Municipal Park, Morrison Knudsen Nature Center
- West Parkcenter Boulevard Bridge
- The Ram Restaurant and Brewery
- Broadway Avenue Bridge
- Bob Gibb Friendship Pedestrian Bridge
- Julia Davis Park
- Solar System Model
- Downtown Boise
- Capitol Boulevard Memorial Bridge
- Boise City Main Library
- Anne Frank Human Rights Memorial
- Old 8th Street Pedestrian Bridge
- 9th Street Bridge
- Cottonwood Grille Restaurant
- Shoreline Park (first section of Greenbelt)
- Ann Morrison Park pedestrian bridge (Pioneer Footbridge)
- Americana Boulevard Bridge
- Firefighters Memorial
- Old railroad bridge (now a pedestrian bridge)
- I-184 Bridge
- Fairview Avenue Bridge
- Main Street Bridge
- Lynn Henneman Cenotaph
- Quinn's Pond
- Boise River Recreation Park, Whitewater Park
- 36th Street Pedestrian Bridge (Pleasanton Street)
- Esther Simplot Park (undeveloped as of 2010)
- Veterans Memorial Park
- Veterans Parkway Bridge
- Willow Lane Park
- Plantation Island and pedestrian bridges
- Glenwood Street Bridge
- Riverside Village subdivision detour
- Eagle River Pavilion
- Island Woods pedestrian bridge
- Merrill Park
- Eagle Hilton Garden Inn
- Eagle Road Bridge

Approximately 1.5 miles (2.4 km) west of Veterans Memorial Parkway the north bank trail ends. However, two pedestrian bridges carry traffic to the south bank trail via an area known as Plantation Island. The north bank trail resumes at the Glenwood Street bridge approximately 1-mile (1.6 km) west of the first Plantation Island pedestrian bridge.

Also on the north bank, approximately 1/4 mile west of Glenwood Bridge the greenbelt becomes a bicycle dismount zone at the Riverside Village residential development. The bicycle dismount zone continues approximately 1.5 miles (2.4 km) westward. As of April 2008 Garden City has made it a misdemeanor to ride a bicycle on the greenbelt through Riverside Village. However, there is a roughly parallel signed bicycle route which allows bicyclists to continue westward on residential streets to the City of Eagle greenbelt without having to ride on busy State Street (State Highway 44).

=== South Bank, from east to west ===
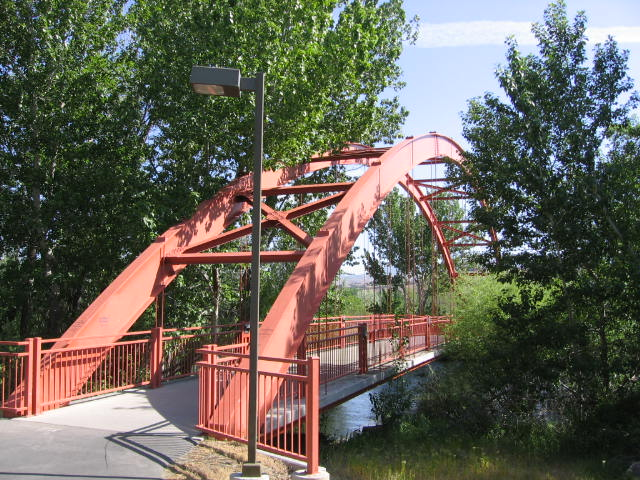
Baybrook Court Pedestrian Bridge, SE 2.1, in Boise

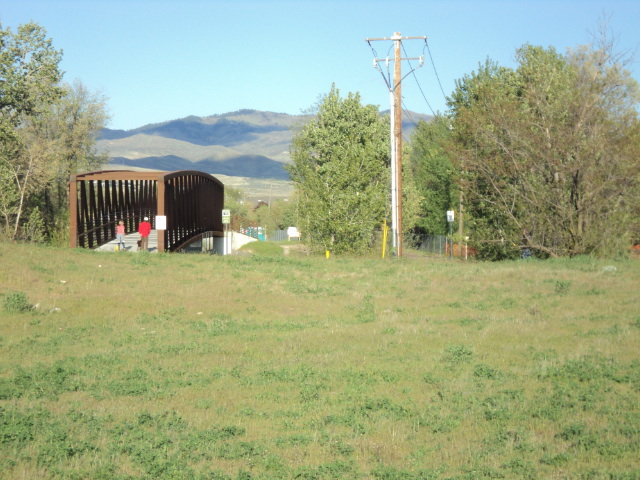
The 36th Ave. Pedestrian Bridge, SW 2.0, connects Garden City with Boise

- Barber Park
- Bown Crossing, A New Urbanism style district
- Parkcenter Blvd. residential area
- Baybrook Court Footbridge
- Boise State University
- Ann Morrison Park
- Kathryn Albertson Park
- Joe's Crab Shack Restaurant
- Riverside Hotel
- Garden City Boys and Girls Club
- Plantation Island
- Expo Idaho
- Glenwood Street bridge
- Garden City Library

In the Parkcenter Boulevard area bicycling is prohibited on a section which is unpaved and follows the river bank for approximately 2 miles (3.2 km) from Barber Park to East River Run Drive. Bicyclists are routed on a circuitous route on residential neighborhood streets.

A more significant gap in the south bank trail is at the west end of Ann Morrison Park where there is a 1/2-mile (800 m) gap from the Americana Boulevard bridge westward to the Main Street bridge. At the downstream side of the Main Street bridge the south bank trail resumes to approximately 1/4-mile (400 m) east of the Western Idaho Fairgrounds at East 52nd Street. A brief detour via East 52nd Street, Alworth Street and Remington Street returns users to the south bank Greenbelt and continues westward approximately 1-mile (1.6 km) west of the Glenwood Street Bridge.

== Boise River Greenbelt DOTS ==
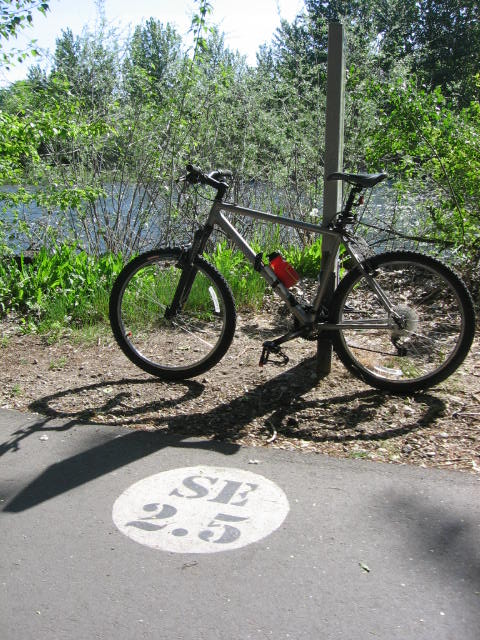
A milepost example

DOTS is an acronym for Distance & Orientation Trail System. Serving as mileposts, there are over 100 white dots 18 inches (45 cm) in diameter painted on the greenbelt. The purpose of the DOTS is to aid people in locating their position on the greenbelt relative to the downtown Boise central point. The central point, mile 0, is located near the intersection of 8th Street and River Street in downtown Boise. The DOTS are spaced at 1/10-mile (160 m) increments. For example, if one is on the north bank 1-mile (1.6 km) west of the central point one would see a DOT with the inscription NW 1.0. If one is on the south bank 5.3 miles (8.5 km) east of the central point, one would see the inscription SE 5.3.

== Riverside Village Controversy ==
A stretch of greenbelt west of Glenwood Street in Garden City on the north side has been closed in varying degrees over the last three decades. The former Idaho state land was offered on condition that "...they shall construct certain improvements on the State land consisting of a bike path, lakes, pedestrian bridges (where the latter are required to assure a continuous linkage of greenbelt next to the Boise River for the length of the Riverside Village project)...", but these terms have never been met. At one point a stretch even had a sign posted stating "Private Property. No Trespassing. This is not part of the Boise Greenbelt. Violators will be prosecuted." In 2007, a ban on bicycles through this stretch was approved by Garden City Mayor John Evans. Evans oversaw construction of the Riverside Village neighborhood as the development manager for Idaho Forest Industries (IFI) and Evans Brothers Construction.

== See also ==
- List of parks in Boise

== Comparable Trails ==
- Sacramento, CA, Jedediah Smith Memorial Trail
- Salt Lake City, UT Jordan River Parkway
- Spokane, WA Spokane River Centennial Trail
- Idaho Falls, ID Greenbelt
- Redding, CA, Sacramento River Trail
