= Jeff Hall =

Jeff or Jeffrey Hall may refer to:

- Jeff Hall (American football) (born 1976), former American football placekicker
- Jeff Hall (animator), cartoon animator and director
- Jeff Hall (footballer) (1929–1959), English footballer
- Jeff Hall (golfer) (born 1957), English professional golfer
- Jeff Hall (politician) (born 1951), African-American accountant and politician
- Jeffrey C. Hall (born 1945), American geneticist and chronobiologist
- Jeffrey R. Hall (1978–2011), American plumber and neo-Nazi murdered by his son
- Jeffrey Hall (performer) (born 1958), Canadian choreographer, director, and performer

== See also ==
- Geoff Hall (disambiguation)
- Jefferson Hall (disambiguation)
- Jeffry Hall Brock, Canadian businessman
