= Jefferson House =

Jefferson House may refer to:

in Sri Lanka

- Jefferson House, Columbo

in the United States

- Monticello, Charlottesville, Virginia, home of president Thomas Jefferson
- Joe Jefferson Clubhouse, Saddle River, New Jersey, listed on the National Register of Historic Places (NRHP)
- Joseph Jefferson House, Jefferson Island, Louisiana, NRHP-listed
- W. E. Jefferson House, Boise, Idaho, NRHP-listed in Ada County
- John P. Jefferson House, Warren, Pennsylvania, NRHP-listed

== See also ==
- Jefferson Hall (disambiguation)
- Jefferson School (disambiguation)
