= Geoffrey Hall =

Geoffrey Hall or Geoff Hall may refer to:

- Geoff Hall (cricketer) (1941–2009), English cricketer
- Geoff Hall (physicist), British particle physicist
- Geoff Hall (politician) (born 1948), American teacher and politician in the Massachusetts House of Representatives
- Geoffrey Hall (cinematographer), Australian cinematographer
- Geoffrey Hall (priest), Canadian priest

== See also ==
- Geoffrey Hall-Say (1864–1940), British figure skater
- Jeff Hall (disambiguation)
