= Hopffgarten House =

NRHP historic house in Boise, Idaho, United States

- U.S. National Register of Historic Places
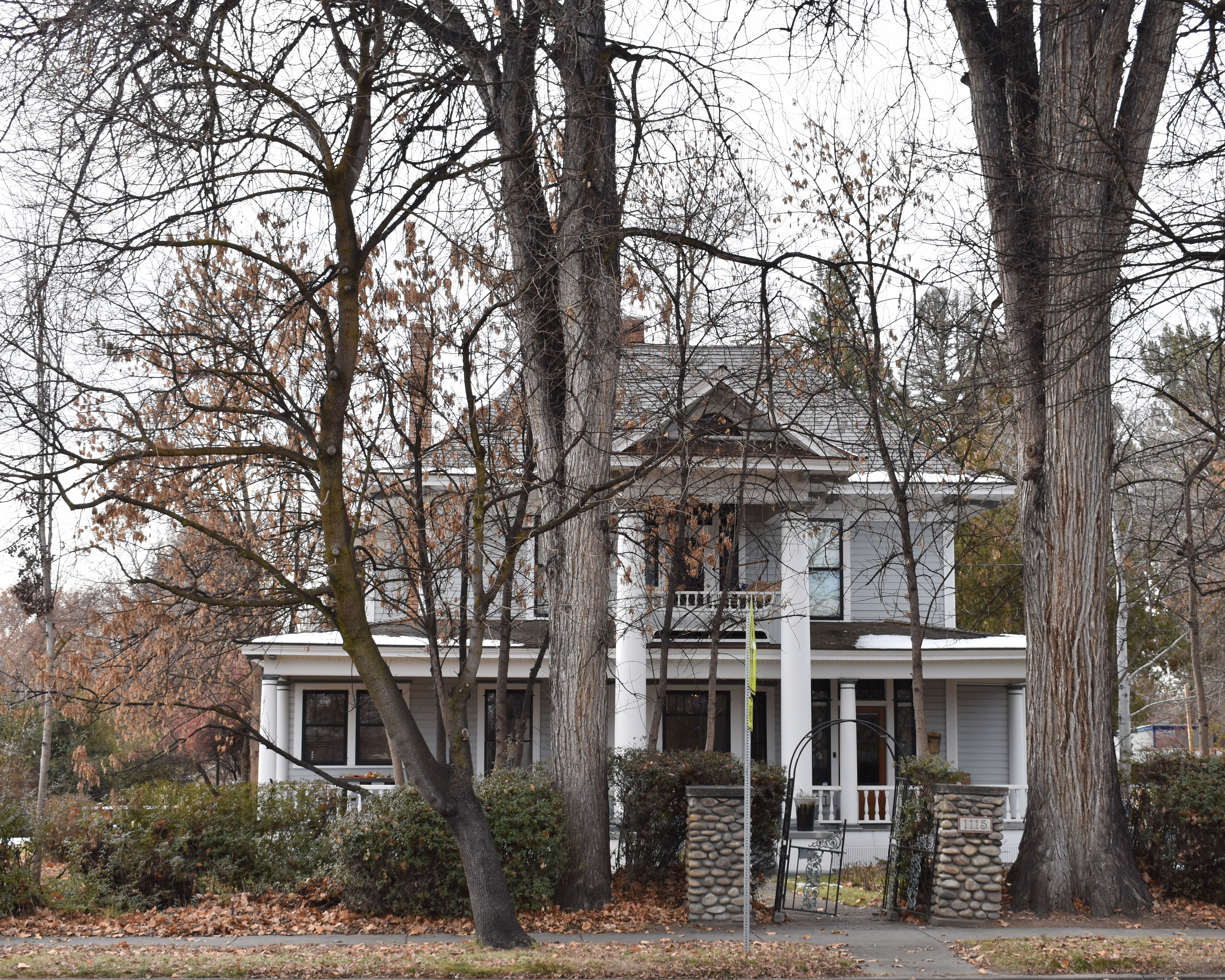
- The Hopffgarten House in 2018

- Location within Idaho Location within the United States
- Location: 1115 W. Boise Ave., Boise, Idaho
- Coordinates: 43°35′29″N 116°11′40″W
- Area: 2 acres (0.81 ha)
- Built: 1899
- Architect: Wayland & Fennell
- Architectural style: Neo Classical, Georgian Revival
- NRHP reference No.: 79000764
- Added to NRHP: August 30, 1979

The Hopffgarten House in Boise, Idaho, is a 2 1/2 story Neo Classical structure built around 1899 in the Georgian Revival style and substantially modified by Wayland & Fennell in 1923. The house was listed on the National Register of Historic Places in 1979.

== History ==
The house was constructed around 1899 for Albin C. DeMary, a clerk at the U.S. Assay Office in Boise. In 1905 DeMary sold the house to E. Van Buskirk, and Van Buskirk made extensive improvements. Harry Hopffgarten purchased the house in 1915, and he hired contractor Arthur O. Maus to remodel the residence in 1919. In 1922 Hopffgarten hired Wayland & Fennell to remodel the residence, including an addition and basement excavation, and the work was completed in 1923. After Wayland & Fennell's Georgian Revival modifications, the house has not been altered substantially.

In 1960 a 75-ft tree fell against the back side of the house, and Hopffgarten subsequently removed from the property all of his 50-year-old trees.

== Harry Hopffgarten ==
John Harry Hopffgarten (May 1, 1883 – September 1, 1975) and Anna Mae (Williams) Hopffgarten (February 12, 1884 – November 18, 1972) moved from Spokane, Washington, to Boise in 1904 and founded the Hopffgarten Sign Co. In 1915 the Hopffgartens moved from their house at 13th and Resseguie Streets (A. Q. Artz House) to their namesake house at S Denver and W Boise Avenues.

Hopffgarten was a muralist as well as a sign painter, and his murals survive in the Hopffgarten House and in Boise's El Korah Shrine Temple. He is known also as the artisan who applied gold leaf to the George Washington equestrian statue (Charles Osner, 1869) in the rotunda of the Idaho State Capitol Building.

In 1916 the Hopffgartens donated to the city a triangular piece of land adjacent to their house, now known as the Hopffgarten Property, to be tended as a public park.
