= W. E. Jefferson House =

- U.S. National Register of Historic Places
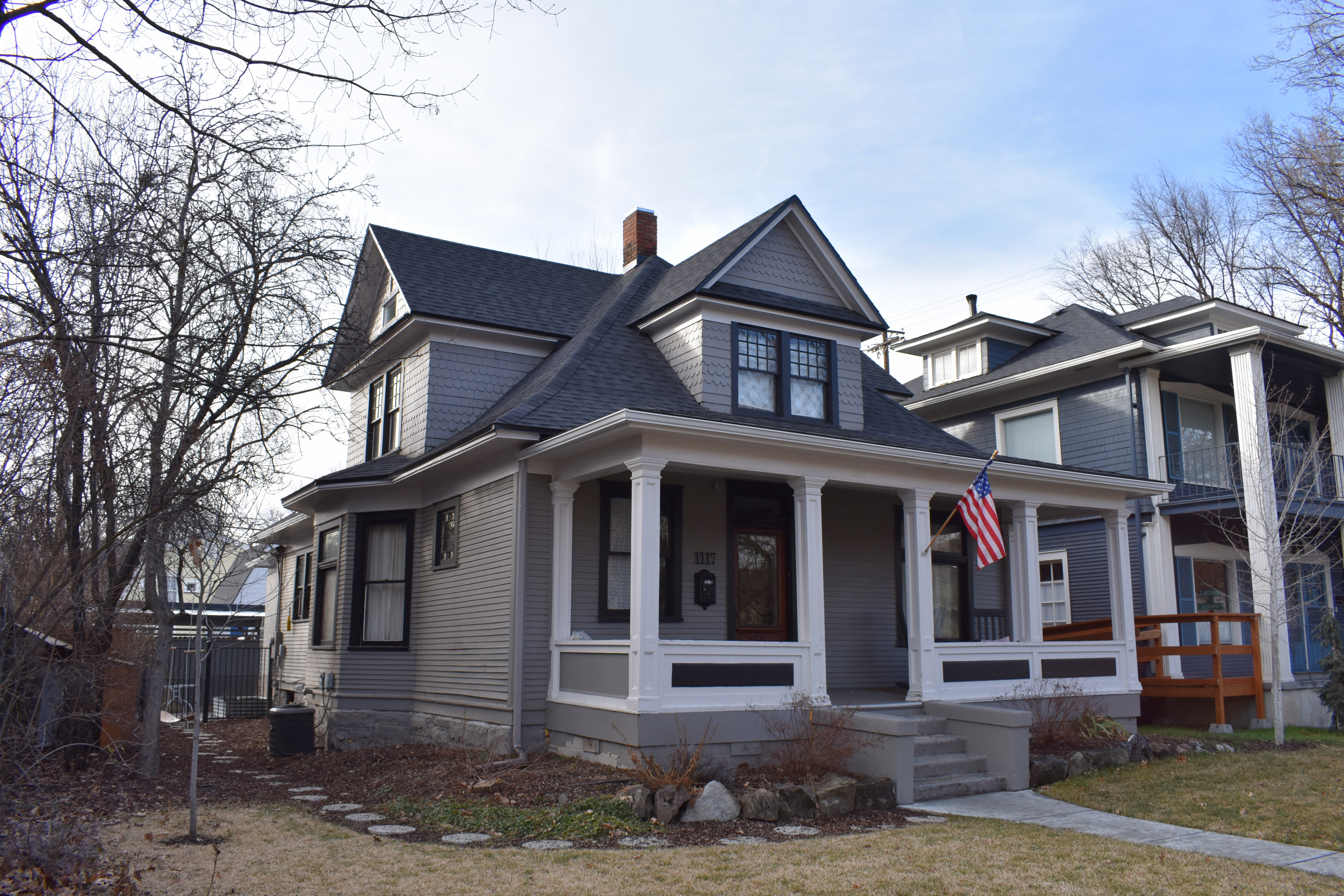
- The W.E. Jefferson House in 2019

- Location within Idaho Location within the United States
- Location: 1117 N. 8th St., Boise, Idaho
- Coordinates: 43°37′28″N 116°11′49″W
- Area: less than one acre
- Built: 1907
- Architect: Tourtelotte & Co.
- Architectural style: Queen Anne, Shingle Style
- MPS: Tourtellotte and Hummel Architecture TR
- NRHP reference No.: 82000214
- Added to NRHP: November 17, 1982

The W. E. Jefferson House in Boise, Idaho, is a 1 1/2-story Queen Anne, Shingle style cottage designed by Tourtellotte & Co. and constructed in 1907 in Boise's Hyde Park neighborhood. The house features front, right, and left gabled dormers and a cross-facade porch supported by square coffered posts. The house was added to the National Register of Historic Places (NRHP) in 1982.

William and Mary Jefferson purchased property for the house in 1906 from Charles Paynton, whose house in the next block on N 8th St. also was designed by Tourtellotte (1900) and also is listed on the NRHP. The Jeffersons built a garage on the lot in 1921, and they advertised the house as a rental property in 1925.

William Jefferson worked as a carpenter for Anton Goreczky at the Boise Sash and Door Factory. The Goreczky house also is listed on the NRHP.

== See also ==
- Charles Paynton House
- Anton Goreczky House
