= List of parks in Boise =

Parks in Boise, Idaho

Over 90 parks and undeveloped sites are managed by the Parks & Recreation Department in Boise, Idaho, including 86 tennis courts, 48 soccer fields, 25 pickleball courts, 22 basketball courts, six bocce courts, three lacrosse fields, an archery range, and a cricket field. City parks also include more than 45,000 trees and 190 miles of trails covering over 4600 acres. The park system includes 11 reserves with 40 miles of trails on 4000 acres of habitat.

== List of parks in Boise ==
Name	Image	Location	Notes
Aldape Park		629 N San Jose Rd; 43.613793°N 116.179338°W	1/2 acre added in 1964 when Aldape Heights, named for Felipe Aldape, was annexed into the city.
Alta Harris Park		4049 S Eckert Rd; 43.565006°N 116.127841°W	20 unimproved acres were donated to the city by the Harris Family in 2002 to honor Alta Harris.
Ann Morrison Park		1000 S Americana Blvd; 43.6116859°N 116.2232622°W	153 acres donated to the city and landscaped by Harry Morrison. The park is a memorial to Morrison's wife, Ann.
Baggley Park		1410 E Parkcenter Blvd; 43.5829828°N 116.166956°W	Seven acres formerly known as Loggers Creek Park. The park was rededicated in 1990 to recognize the career of George Baggley.
Barber Observation Point		6300 S Surprise Way; 43.545012°N 116.103752°W	Two acres with view of the 712-acre Barber Pool Conservation Area, a former log holding pond near Barber Dam. In 1902 James T. Barber and others founded the Barber Lumber Co. which operated in the area until 1934.
Bethine Church River Trail		Boise Greenbelt; 43.591492°N 116.171104°W	1.6-mile section of Boise greenbelt within a 24-acre nature area, roughly bounded by Cottonwoods Apartments on the River and East Parkcenter Bridge. The section of greenbelt is named for conservationist Bethine Church.
Boise Hills Park		651 E Clubview Dr; 43.6319652°N 116.1827581°W	7.3 acres in Boise Heights developed in 2005 and improved in 2012.
Borah Park		801 S Aurora Dr; 43.597358°N 116.2650708°W	13 acres adjacent to Borah High School, developed by the city in 1966 and expanded in 2010. The park and school were named for Senator William Borah.
Bowden Park		3230 Edson St; 43.5958096°N 116.2216528°W	3 acres developed in 1952 and named for Carl G. Bowden.
Bowler Park Site		4403 S Surprise Way; 43.5585263°N 116.1295476°W	24.6 undeveloped acres acquired in 1995 from conservationists Beth and Bruce Bowler.
C. W. Moore Park		150 S 5th St; 43.6130425°N 116.200491°W	Smaller than 1/3 acre deeded to the city in 1916 by banker and boise pioneer C.W. Moore, the space was known briefly as Peter Pan Park. The park was removed in 1956 and reestablished in 1983 to display a collection of architectural artifacts.
Camel's Back Park		1200 W Heron St; 43.6345752°N 116.2042647°W	11 acres of developed land acquired by the city from Bernard Lemp in 1932 and designated a park in 1958.
Cassia Park		4600 W Camas St; 43.5961536°N 116.2412498°W	14 acres purchased by the city in 1967 and developed in 1973.
Castle Hills Park		5350 N Eugene St; 43.668526°N 116.262479°W	7.2 acres acquired in 1980 near the location of Boise's former Pierce Park (1907–1928).
Catalpa Park		4516 W Catalpa Dr; 43.6561415°N 116.2477443°W	7 acres acquired in 1996 and developed in 2001–02.
Cecil D. Andrus Park		601 W Jefferson St; 43.6166071°N 116.2020494°W	2 acres adjacent to the Idaho State Capitol building. In 2018 Capitol Park was rededicated as Cecil D. Andrus Park to recognize the work of former governor and cabinet secretary Cecil D. Andrus.
Charles F. McDevitt Youth Sports Complex		5101 N Eagle Rd; 43.6510264°N 116.3565362°W	40 acres including 10 undeveloped acres annexed into the city in 1999, named for Charles McDevitt, a former executive with Boise Cascade Company and former Idaho Supreme Court justice.
Cherie Buckner-Webb Park		1100 W Bannock St; 43.61893°N 116.20621°W	1/2 acre developed in 2021 replacing a parking lot, named for Cherie Buckner-Webb.
Comba Park		2995 N Five Mile Rd; 43.6320063°N 116.3182448°W	3.2 acres donated to the city in 2000 by Trudy and John Comba and developed in 2004. A dedication was held in 2014.
Cottonwood Park		4350 N Colonial Park Way; 43.6453367°N 116.3473095°W	8 acres in west Boise.
Cypress Park		4382 S Tableridge Way; 43.5623845°N 116.1654892°W	7 developed acres in the Breckenridge subdivision formerly known as Breckenridge Park.
DeMeyer Park		5100 N Tumbleweed Pl; 43.6507678°N 116.3290648°W	12 acres given to the city in 1977 by Albert and Hazel DeMeyer.
Dewey Park		2150 N 15th St; 43.638248°N 116.205513°W	Less than one acre. The park contains an Oregon Trail route marker.
Dona Larsen Park		150 S Broadway; 43.6091901°N 116.1936825°W	14 1/2 acres with two stadiums managed by Boise State University athletics. Formerly Cody Park (1911) then Public School Field (1924) prior to construction of East Junior High School (1953), the park was dedicated in 2012 and named for Dona Larsen, a former teacher and coach at East Junior High.
Eagle Rock Park		2150 N Kellogg Ln; 43.603662°N 116.166880°W	11 acres leased by the State of Idaho to the city in 1983. In April, 2019, Boise Arts & History Department and Boise Parks and Recreation recommended changing the name of Quarry View Park to Eagle Rock Park, Pava Kweena Teppi in the Bannock language, to honor Boise Valley Indigenous People.
Eagle Rock Reserve		451 N Quarry View Pl; 43.6070326°N 116.1705997°W	48 1/2 acres of undeveloped land on a site sacred to Native Americans. In April, 2019, Boise Arts & History Department and Boise Parks and Recreation recommended changing the name of Castle Rock Reserve to Chief Eagle Eye Reserve, Ige Dai Teviwa in the Bannock language, to honor Boise Valley Indigenous People.
Elm Grove Park		2200 W Irene St; 43.636393°N 116.2170058°W	3 acres developed in 1911 as part of Boise's Elm Grove Addition, purchased by the city in 1920.
Esther Simplot Park		3206 W Pleasanton Ave; 43.6268653°N 116.2305004°W	55 acres including 23 acres of fishing and swimming ponds developed in 2003. The park is named for donor Esther Simplot who was active in Boise arts and culture.
Fairmont Park		7925 W Northview St; 43.625948°N 116.282870°W	7 acres in the Fairmont Park subdivision (1968) partially developed in 1975 and improved in 1977.
Fairview Park		2300 W Idaho St; 43.6231176°N 116.2212991°W	2 acres in the Fairview Addition (1903) in an area formerly known as Agricultural Park (1875). Fairview Park was acquired by the city in 1926.
Florence Park		7800 W Florence St; 43.6163869°N 116.2819057°W	2 acres developed in 2001 with play facilities added in 2003.
Foothills East Park		1465 E Shenandoah Dr; 43.6115804°N 116.170711°W	8 acres in the Foothills East subdivision (1972).
Foothills East Reserve		1220 E Shenandoah Dr; 43.6138656°N 116.1776951°W	30 acres protected in 1970 prior to development of the Foothills East subdivision.
Fort Boise Park		155 E Garrison Rd; 43.6148891°N 116.1911117°W	33 acres on a site formerly known as Boise Barracks, acquired by the city in 1950.
Franklin Park		310 S Hilton St; 43.6015663°N 116.247424°W	3 partially developed acres purchased by the city in 2013 at the site of the former Franklin School (1926–2009).
Golda Harris Nature Preserve		2851 E Warm Springs Ave; 43.5782337°N 116.1540422°W	3 undeveloped acres donated to the city by Harris family members.
Gordon S. Bowen Park		1013 W O'Farrell St; 43.624601°N 116.2029266°W	Less than one acre developed in 1983 and named in 1991 for former park superintendent Gordon S. Bowen.
Boise Greenbelt		Boise Greenbelt; 43.605671°N 116.203334°W	Over 25 miles and 850 acres of pedestrian and bike trails connecting Barber Park, Municipal Park, Julia Davis Park, Ann Morrison Park, Kathryn Albertson Park and others. The greenbelt also connects future park sites and points of interest managed by the city.
Helen B. Lowder Park		3450 S Law Ave; 43.5708087°N 116.164577°W	5 acres formerly known as Centennial Park, rededicated as Helen B. Lowder Park in 2003 to honor the past president of the Boise Parks & Recreation Commission.
Hewett Park		11211 W McMillan Rd; 43.6482564°N 116.3246024°W	6 acres acquired by the city in 1980.
Hillside Park		4150 N 36th St; 43.6584972°N 116.2320624°W	15 acres planned in 1961 as part of Hillside Junior High School development, acquired by the city in 1973 and finished in 1976.
Hillside to Hollow Reserve		2755 N Harrison Hollow Ln; 43.6435923°N 116.2095339°W	319 acres from Hillside Park to Harrison Hollow.
Hobble Creek Park		629 N San Jose Rd; 43.613793°N 116.179338°W	21 acres developed in 1997 as part of the Hobble Creek subdivision.
Hopffgarten Property		1059 W Boise Ave; 43.5909663°N 116.1970252°W	Less than one acre donated to the city in 1916 by Anna and Harry Hopffgarten. The park is adjacent to the Hopffgarten House, listed on the National Register of Historic Places.
Hulls Gulch Reserve		3001 N Sunset Peak Rd; 43.6391017°N 116.198462°W	292 acres of habitat near Camel's Back Park, preserved 1991–93. Hull's Gulch is referenced in 1868 along with Crane's Gulch and part of Dry Creek within Township 4 N, Range 2 E on the Boise Meridian, named for the father of Martha Hull (M. Baxter), whose name may have been Alfred Hull.
Hyatt Hidden Lakes Reserve		5301 N Maple Grove Rd; 43.6513962°N 116.2993759°W	44 acres of wetlands acquired by the city in 1999 and named for previous owner Larry Hyatt.
Idaho Anne Frank Human Rights Memorial		770 S 8th St; 43.6513962°N 116.2993759°W	Less than one acre dedicated in 2002 as both a memorial to Anne Frank and to education about human rights.
Idaho Fallen Firefighters Memorial Park		1791 W Shoreline Dr; 43.617941°N 116.2267887°W	5 acres dedicated in 2008 to firefighters who have died in the line of duty.
Ivywild Park		416 W Ivywild St; 43.581492°N 116.188887°W	18 acres formerly known as South Boise Park, acquired by the city in 1966 and developed in 1974. After development, the park was redesignated Ivywild, a name borrowed from Ivywild, Colorado Springs. An Ivywild Park had existed in South Boise prior to 1916, and South Boise Park on the west side of S Broadway had been in use beginning in 1904.
J.A. and Kathryn Albertson Family Foundation Boise Whitewater Park		3400 W Pleasanton Ave; 43.6260464°N 116.2306811°W	Less than one acre of the Boise Greenbelt bordering approximately 2 surface acres of the Boise River, opened in 2012 and named for members of the Albertson family.
John Booth Memorial		850 W Royal Blvd; 43.608494°N 116.209279°W	1 1/2 acres, formerly known as Small Park, renamed for Dr. John Booth (April 17, 1895 – January 9, 1966), former executive secretary of the Idaho Education Association and organizer of the Garden Clubs of Idaho. An earlier Booth Park existed in South Boise around the turn of the 20th century and was located a few blocks southwest of the memorial to Dr. Booth.
Julia Davis Park		700 S Capitol Blvd; 43.6102415°N 116.2077941°W	Boise's oldest park, 89.4 acres, originally 43 acres, named for pioneer Julia (McCrumb) Davis, wife of Thomas Jefferson Davis, a prominent land owner and developer.
Jullion Park		3801 N Jullion Way; 43.638589°N 116.3078874°W	11 acres acquired by the city in 1979.
Kathryn Albertson Park		1001 N Americana Blvd; 43.614836°N 116.2292474°W	41 acres of habitat opened in 1989 and named for Kathryn Albertson.
Kristen's Park		1100 W River St; 43.613614°N 116.213450°W	Less than one acre along Pioneer Walk donated in 1980 by Robert J. Gordon and dedicated to Kristen Massman.
Kristin Armstrong Municipal Park		500 S Walnut St; 43.6033203°N 116.1873484°W	28 acres formerly known as Municipal Park, renamed in 2016 for Olympic medalist Kristin Armstrong.
Kroeger Park		2919 S Leadville Ave; 43.5759426°N 116.1915281°W	3/4 acres on land donated to the city in 1913 by Theodore and Pauline Kroeger.
Laura Moore Cunningham Arboretum		1149 E Lewis St; 43.6045379°N 116.1857548°W	5 acres with 90 species of deciduous trees and over 20 species of conifers. The property was donated to the city in 1963 by Laura Moore Cunningham.
Liberty Park		520 N Liberty St; 43.609469°N 116.2620577°W	10 acres acquired by the city in 1975.
Magnolia Park		7136 N Bogart Ln; 43.6811484°N 116.295869°W	7 partially developed acres.
Manitou Park		2001 S Manitou Ave; 43.587294°N 116.2019507°W	11 acres acquired by the city in 1977 with funds released through the Housing and Community Development Act of 1974.
Marianne Williams Park		3451 E Barber Valley Dr; 43.5732806°N 116.1430426°W	70 acres donated by Larry and Marianne Williams in 2005.
Mariposa Park		9851 W Irving St; 43.614838°N 116.3078396°W	7 1/3 acres acquired by the city in 2004 and dedicated in 2019. A naming contest chose the Spanish word for butterfly, and the park will feature a pollinator garden. The park is at the site of the former Sterling Nursery.
McAuley Park		1655 E Resseguie St; 43.6263258°N 116.209265°W	1/4 acre named in 1912 for city councilor and park enthusiast Ernest H. McAuley, although the property had been known as McAuley Park in 1910 and in 1911.
Memorial Park		900 N 6th St; 43.6221267°N 116.196953°W	7 acres of federal land acquired by the city in 1923 for a memorial to Idaho's war dead. The park was landscaped by members of the Grand Army of the Republic, and Boise City Council considered naming the park "Idaho G.A.R. Memorial Park, No. 1."
Mesa Reserve		2061 S Ridge Point Way; 43.5858123°N 116.1436917°W	164 undeveloped acres including and adjacent to 30 miles of trails.
Military Reserve		750 N Mountain Cove Rd; 43.616384°N 116.184281°W	726 acres of partially developed land in the area of the former Boise Barracks. Boise purchased 449 acres of the reserve from the Bureau of Land Management in 1956 at $3.00 per acre.
Milwaukee Park		3950 N Milwaukee St; 43.6405917°N 116.2845241°W	10 acres acquired by the city in 1973. The site hosts West Boise Little League games.
Molenaar Park		2815 S Maple Grove Rd; 43.578406°N 116.2988867°W	20 acres developed in 2017 on land acquired by the city in 1994 from the family of dairy farmer Jake Molenaar.
Morris Hill Park		10 N Roosevelt St; 43.604915°N 116.232304°W	7.9 landscaped acres opened in 2007. The park and adjacent Morris Hill Cemetery are in an area once known as the Morris Tract, named for William B. Morris. Morris dug the Ridenbaugh Canal, named for Morris' nephew William T. Ridenbaugh, to irrigate the Morris Tract, later the Scott Ranch, and surrounding property.
Mountain View Park		7006 W Ustick Rd; 43.6353165°N 116.2720674°W	8 acres acquired in 1972 from Susie and Bruce Amos and Alice and Max Handley.
Murgoitio Park Site		8051 W Salt Creek Ct; 43.571398°N 116.280414°W	163 undeveloped acres acquired by the city in 1993 and named for Louie and Rosie Murgoitio.
Noble Reserve		Five Mile Gulch Trailhead, Shaw Mountain Rd; 43.635716°N 116.101226°W	598 protected acres donated to the city in 2003 by Allen and Billie Dee Noble.
Nottingham Park		5243 N Decatur Dr; 43.6518958°N 116.3019985°W	2 landscaped acres in the Sherwood West Subdivision, deeded to Ada County in 1974 by developer James M. Amyx and transferred to the city in 1975.
Optimist Youth Sports Complex		9889 W Hill Road Pkwy; 43.6895253°N 116.3092679°W	51 acres of sports fields and other public space at the former site of the Patten Dairy Farm (1952), opened by the city and Boise Noon Optimists in 1999.
Oregon Trail Reserve		5000 E Lake Forest Dr; 43.542273°N 116.110157°W	77 acres opened in 2000, preserving a segment of the Oregon Trail. The site includes historic pictographs, wagon ruts, the Beaver Dicks, and the Kelton Ramp.
Owens Park		3496 N 39th St; 43.6517897°N 116.2373109°W	1 landscaped acre near the Walnut Grove Subdivision (1947), donated to the city in 1975 by developers Paul and Grace Owens.
Owyhee Park		3400 E Elder St; 43.574339°N 116.224302°W	5 landscaped acres acquired by the city in 1975.
Parkcenter Park		385 E Parkcenter Blvd; 43.5975839°N 116.183656°W	13 landscaped acres donated to the city by Morrison-Knudsen in 1979.
Pearl Jensen Community Park		9920 W Lake Hazel Rd; 43.546749°N 116.3080545°W	85 1/2 undeveloped acres on the former Jensen family farm (66 acres), acquired by the city in 2000.
Peppermint Park		2030 S Sumpter Way; 43.5839114°N 116.3326931°W	7 landscaped acres in the Peppermint Hills subdivision, acquired by the city in 1995 and dedicated in 2006.
Phillippi Park		2299 S Phillippi St; 43.581224°N 116.250209°W	8 1/2 acres purchased in 1971 from Albert and Faye Hooper with funds provided by the Highway Beautification Act. The park opened in 1991.
Pine Grove Park		8995 W Shoup Ave; 43.598135°N 116.292969°W	4 acres reopened in 2013, formerly known as Meikle Park.
Pioneer Tot Lot		501 S Ash St; 43.614288°N 116.212444°W	Less than one acre adjacent to Pioneer Walk and part of the River Street Neighborhood Plan of 1974.
Platt Gardens		2602 W Eastover Ter; 43.6023555°N 116.2161483°W	Less than 1 acre opened in 1928 as an approach to the Boise Depot and named for Oregon Short Line Railroad manager Howard Platt. Union Pacific donated the property to the city in 1982.
Polecat Gulch Reserve		6000 N Collister Dr; 43.613793°N 116.179338°W	475 undeveloped acres owned by the city and 360 acres owned by the Bureau of Land Management. Polecat Gulch Reserve was created in 2003 with the purchase of 120 acres of the former Blessinger Ranch.
Quinn's Pond		3150 W Pleasanton Ave; 43.624120°N 116.232085°W	31 acres known as Bernadine Quinn Riverside Park, including the 22-acre Quinn's Pond. The land was donated to the city in 1997 by Quinn Robbins Construction Co. owner Maurice H. Quinn.
Redwood Park		2675 N Shamrock Ave; 43.629609°N 116.3276409°W	7 landscaped acres purchased from Cloverdale Nursery in 1994.
Rhodes Skate Park		1555 W Front St; 43.6187797°N 116.2163002°W	1.28 acres dedicated in 1995 and named for Glenn Rhodes.
Robert Noble Park		150 E Warm Springs Ave; 43.611266°N 116.193396°W	2/3 acre named for farmer and banker Robert Noble, who purchased the property from John Krall in the early 20th century. The Columbian Club landscaped the property, known as Noble Triangle, prior to 1918 when the heirs of Robert Noble deeded the park to Boise City.
Shoreline Park		1375 Shoreline Dr; 43.6142007°N 116.219887°W	1 3/4 acres dedicated in 1974 as the hub of the Boise greenbelt bikeway.
Shoshone Park		2800 W Canal St; 43.577628°N 116.217355°W	5 1/2 acres purchased by the city in 1972 from Max and Lydia Browning.
Simplot Sports Complex		2437 E Lake Forest Dr; 43.5498472°N 116.154928°W	161 acres opened in the 1990s.
Skyline Park		9939 W Skycliffe Ave; 43.6554271°N 116.3094375°W	1 1/2 acres deeded to the city by donor Edward A. Johnson, developer of the Skyline Subdivision, in 1974.
Spaulding Ranch Site		3805 N Cole Rd; 43.640291°N 116.2789227°W	20 acres acquired by the city in 2016 and part of the Almon W. and Dr. Mary E. Spaulding Ranch site. The property includes a farmhouse, silo, and outbuildings and is listed on the National Register of Historic Places.
Stack Rock Reserve		Milepost 13, N Bogus Basin Rd; 43.7365265°N 116.132184°W	1320 acres near Bogus Basin ski area.
Sterling Park		9851 W Irving St; 43.614619°N 116.3062243°W	8 acres developed in 2018, purchased by the city in 2004 from John and Lynne Sterling.
Stewart Gulch Park		9070 N Eyrie Way; 43.663940°N 116.217373°W	5.8 acres, formerly known as Medicine Creek Park, acquired by the city in the 1990s as part of the Medicine Creek Subdivision.
Sue Howell Park		E Warm Springs Avenue and Hwy 21; 43.543475°N 116.096164°W	16 undeveloped acres donated to the city in 2018 by Sue and Aaron Howell.
Sunset Park		2625 N 32nd St; 43.6441464°N 116.2313899°W	10 acres purchased in 1971 from John Fery, Wanek Stein, Paul B. Larsen, Dan Johnson, and Neil Labrum.
Sycamore Park		12275 W Braddock Dr; 43.5986339°N 116.3378057°W	7 acres acquired by the city in 2000 as part of the Edgeview Estates subdivision.
Taft Kid City		3722 Anderson St; 43.641366°N 116.235196°W	Less than 1 acre adjacent to Taft Elementary School.
Terry Day Park		1225 S Federal Way; 43.5930472°N 116.2077567°W	7 acres donated to the city in 2006 by Pat Day in honor of his wife.
Veterans Memorial Park		930 Veterans Memorial Pkwy; 43.6378593°N 116.2405253°W	38 acres preserved by the State of Idaho as a memorial park in 1971 and leased by the city in 1997.
Warm Springs Park		250 S Marden St; 43.6016983°N 116.1783548°W	19 1/2 acres of habitat preserved in 2000.
Williams Park		201 W Williams St; 43.5907308°N 116.1860007°W	8 acres donated to the city in 1980 by Darrel and Marian Leatham.
Willow Lane Park		4623 W Willow Ln; 43.6427183°N 116.2496562°W	3 landscaped acres acquired by the city in 1973.
Winstead Park		6150 W Northview St; 43.627948°N 116.25993°W	11 landscaped acres acquired by the city in 1965 and named for Judge Charles E. Winstead, former chairman of the park board.
