= Almon W. and Dr. Mary E. Spaulding Ranch =

NRHP historic house in Boise, Idaho, United States

- Spaulding, Almon W. and Dr. Mary E., Ranch
- U.S. National Register of Historic Places
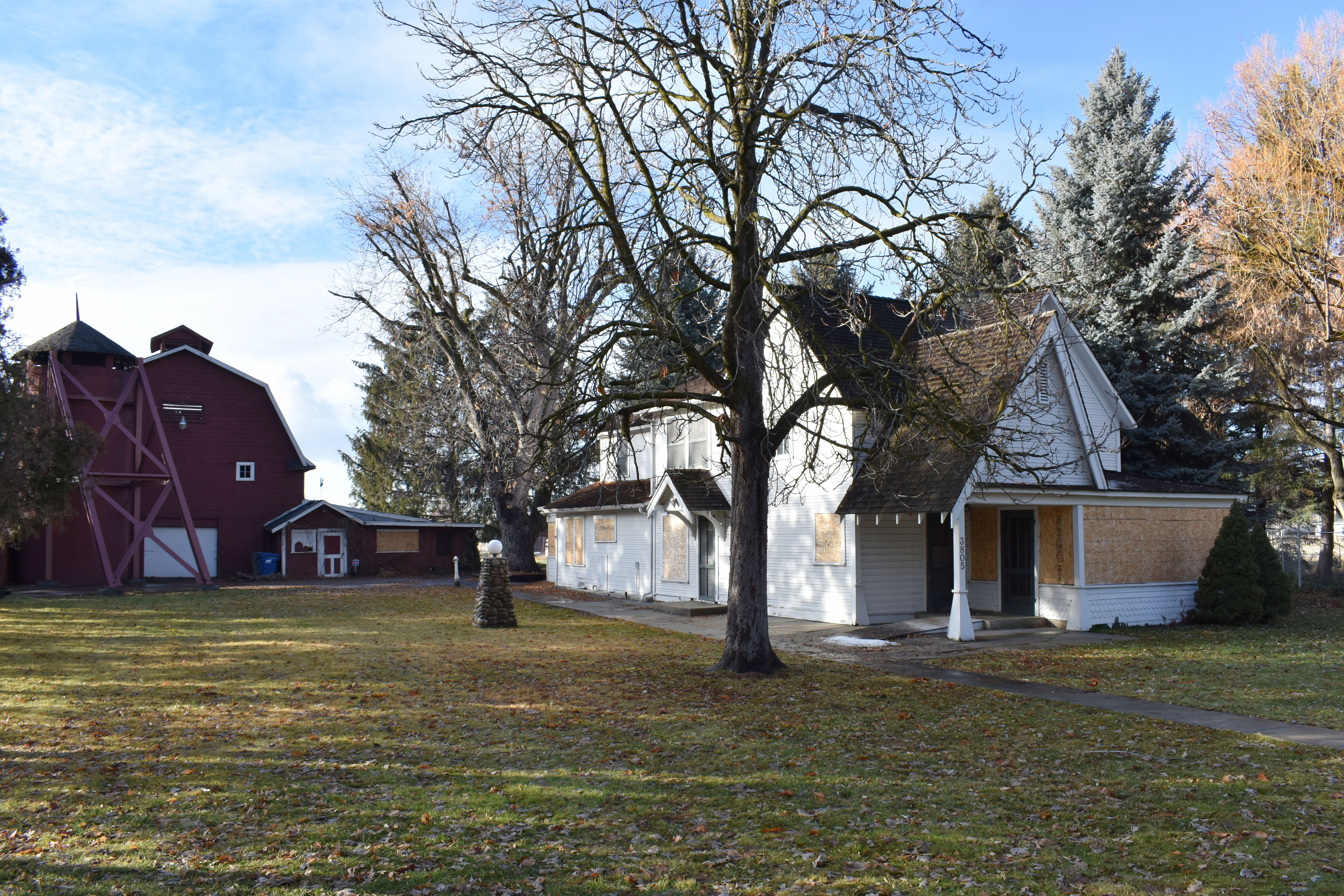
- The Spaulding Ranch in 2018

- Location within Idaho Location within the United States
- Location: 3805 N. Cole Rd., Boise, Idaho
- Area: 20 acres (8.1 ha)
- Built: 1905
- Architectural style: Gable-and-Wing House
- NRHP reference No.: 94001363
- Added to NRHP: November 25, 1994

The Almon W. and Dr. Mary E. Spaulding Ranch is a 20 acres (8.1 ha) farmstead, originally an 80 acres (32 ha) homestead, in Boise, Idaho. The site is named for the Spauldings, who moved from Los Angeles to Boise in 1890 and applied for a homestead in 1893. The Spauldings occupied the site in 1896, constructing the main house in 1905 and the barn in 1910. After Dr. Spaulding's death in 1919, Almon Spaulding continued to reside on the property until 1924.

The site was acquired by the City of Boise in 2016, and it is managed by Boise Parks and Recreation.

The site was added to the National Register of Historic Places in 1994.

== Inventory ==
- House (1905), remodeled in 1910, 1940s, 1950s
- Tenant house, remodeled in 1940s, 1950s
- Barn (1910), altered in 1950s
- Silo (1910)
- Granary (pre 1940)
- Chicken coop (pre 1940)
- Outdoor toilet (pre 1940)
- Sheds (pre 1940)
- Front fence (pre 1920)

== See also ==
- List of parks in Boise
