= Julia Davis Park =

Municipal park in Boise, Idaho, United States

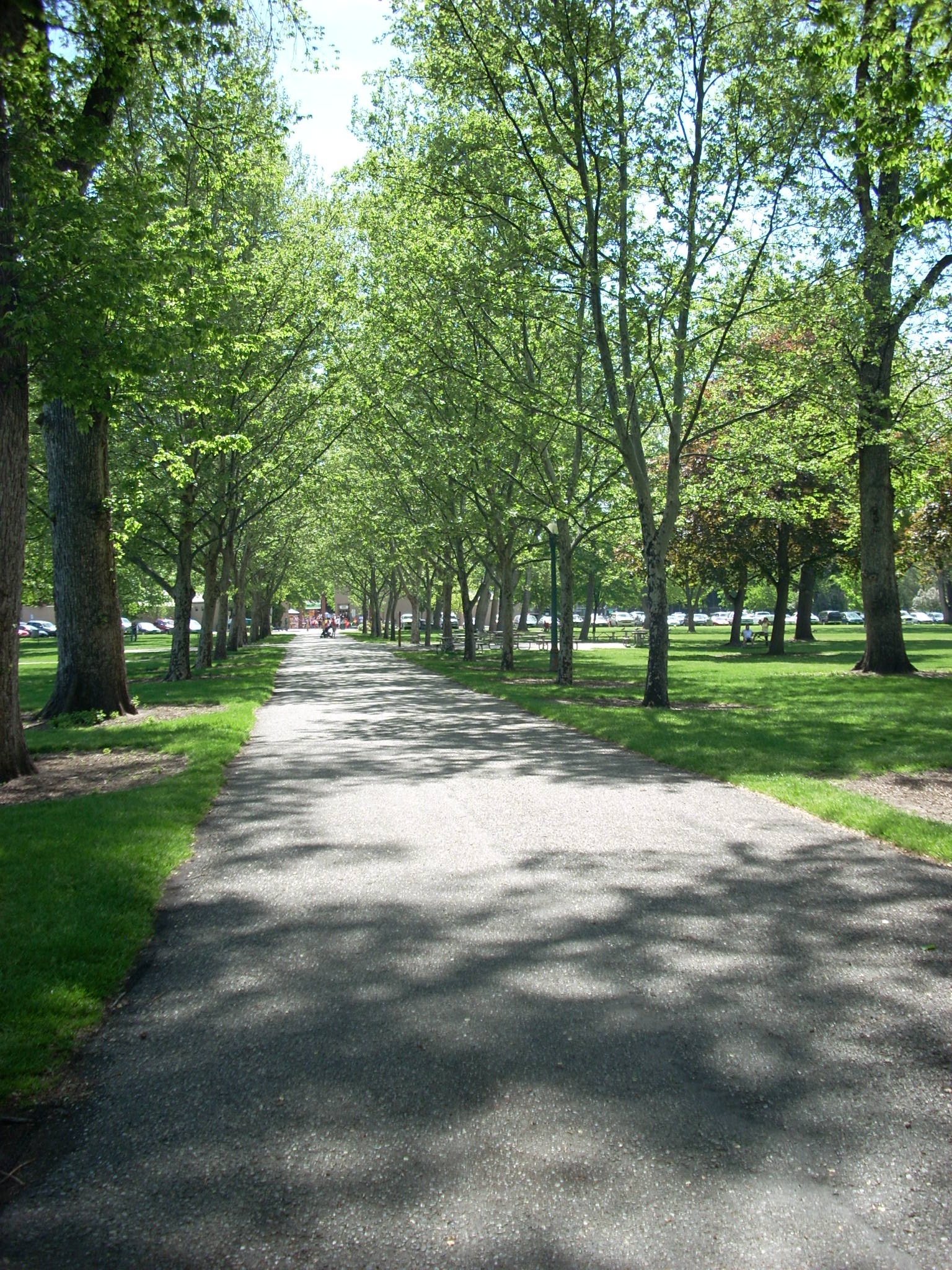
- One of many paths in the park

- Location within the United States Location within Idaho
- Type: Municipal park
- Location: 700 S. Capitol Blvd. Boise, Idaho, U.S.
- Coordinates: 43°36′27.2″N 116°12′5.44″W
- Area: 89.4 acres (36.2 ha)
- Created: November 22, 1907; 118 years ago
- Etymology: Julia Davis, wife of Thomas Jefferson Davis, who donated the land
- Operator: Boise Parks and Recreation
- Status: Open all year, from sunrise to midnight

Julia Davis Park is a municipal park in the western United States, located in the downtown region of Boise, Idaho. Created in 1907 with a land donation from Thomas Jefferson Davis, it is the first park in the "String of Pearls", a series of parks along the Boise River operated by the city's Parks and Recreation Department.

The park contains several museums such as the Boise Art Museum, the Idaho State Historical Museum, and the Idaho Black History Museum, as well as other attractions like Zoo Boise, the Idaho Rose Society, the Gene Harris Band Shell, and Boise River Greenbelt, which runs through the park. Other amenities at Julia Davis Park include river access, statues, a rose garden, a playground and tennis court, a pond with paddle boat rentals, and a pedestrian bridge that connects the park to Boise State University.

The park is bordered by Broadway Avenue to the east, Capital Boulevard to the west, the Boise River to the south, and Myrtle Street to the north.

== History ==
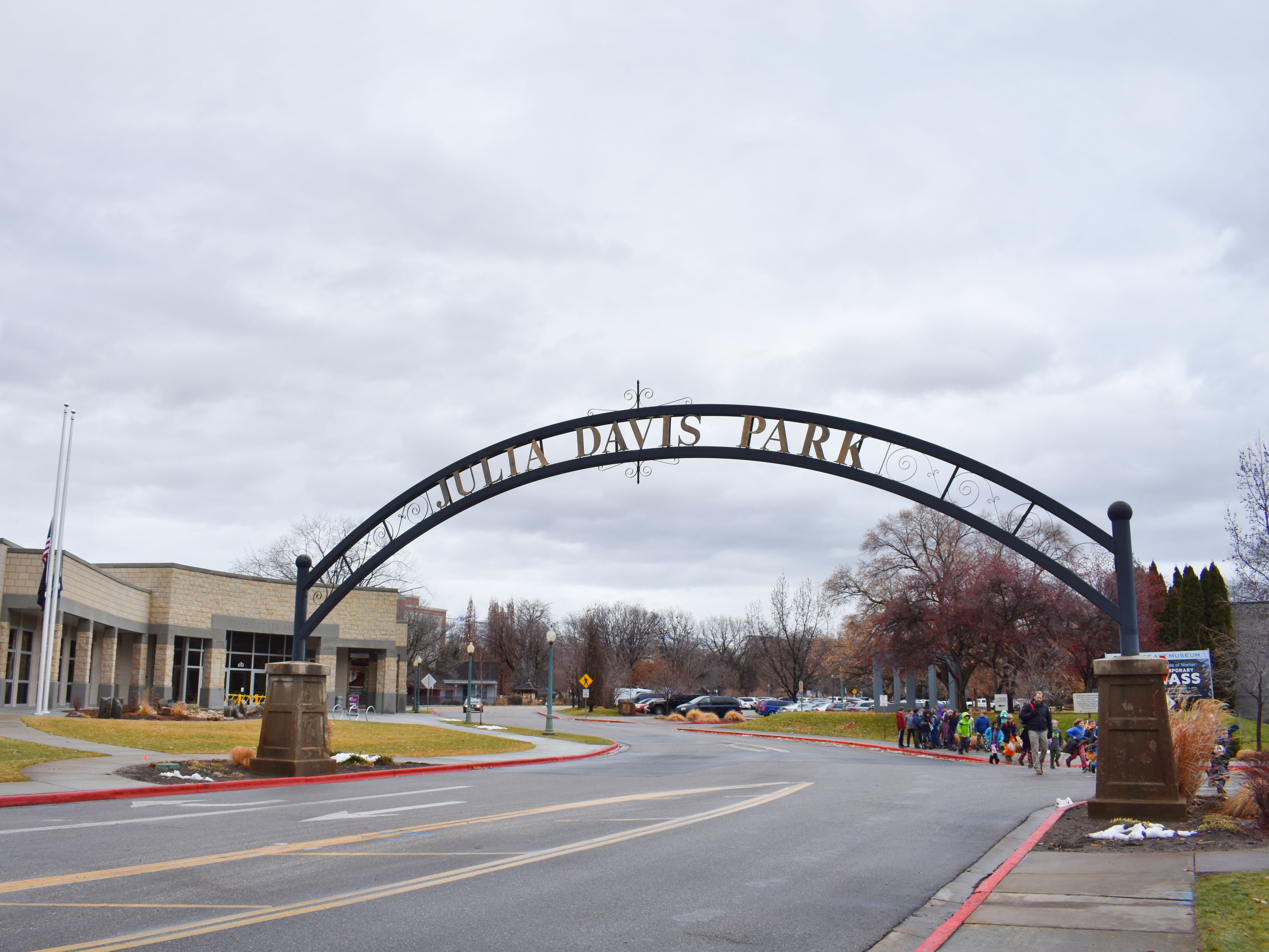
Sign above the park entrance

Julia Davis Park has its roots in the 1862 journey of Thomas and Frank Davis, who traveled to the Boise area from Cincinnati, Ohio, with hopes of joining in the widely publicized gold rush in the Idaho Territory. The brothers staked a claim and mined for a year, before building a cabin in 1863 on the Cottonwood Creek near the site of the present Julia Davis Park. On July 4, 1863, Fort Boise was established and shortly after, the Davis brothers along with seven friends met in the Davis' cabin and planned the formation of the City of Boise. According to one of the friends, William Lowery Ritchie, “in the summer of 1863 the soldiers came and established the garrison; that was sometime early in July. It was about that time we met in our cabin and formed a town co.” Thomas Davis came to play a pivotal role in the development of Boise as a city and sought to help attract visitors and pioneers to the valley. With his mining claim being less than profitable, Davis turned to the promotion of agriculture by planting 7,000 apple trees on his land along the Boise River. Additionally, he started buying up land in the valley from the United States land office, receiving Cash Certificate No. 1 for 160 acres (0.65 km^{2}) in 1868 when the first land office opened up. Within several years, Davis went on to purchase the first water rights in the valley, as well as an additional 1,150 acres (4.7 km^{2}) from the federal government along the foothills and where the town of Garden City was developed. In 1871, Davis married Julia McCrumb, who had travelled to Boise from Ontario, Canada, to visit family in 1869.

In 1899, the Davis couple offered a section of their orchard lands for use as a park, but the city didn't immediately act on this offer. They again offered a deed for a park in February 1907. Finally, after the death of Julia Davis in September, presumably from typhoid, the city paid one dollar to Thomas Davis as he deeded 40 acres (160,000 m^{2}) acres of land to the city in memory of his wife in November 1907. He required that the land be utilized for public purposes and that the park would be “always and forever” known as Julia Davis Park. Davis enforced this by including in the deed a stipulation that the land would return to the Davis heirs if the property were ever used for any other purpose. The next year, in 1908, Davis died, many Boiseans attended the funeral and respected the couple's philanthropy.

In the decade following Davis's death, the city worked to improve the park and upgrade the land by adding walls, planting vegetation, and creating a general development plan with the help of Arthur L. Peck in 1912. In 1916, the Boise Zoo, now known as Zoo Boise, was created. During the next decade, the park expanded with a series of land donations from the Davis estate in 1922, 1929, 1931, and 1932. During this time, a bandshell was built in the park in 1928, and the Boise Zoo expanded in 1929. In 1931, the Morrison-Knudsen Company built the Capitol Boulevard Memorial Bridge next to Julia Davis Park. As the economy improved following the Great Depression, Julia Davis Park saw the dedication of a rose garden in 1939, and the expansion of the park to its current borders from Capitol Boulevard to Broadway Avenue in 1940 and 1941.

In 1950, the Idaho Historical Museum was established on the park grounds, and Union Pacific donated Engine 2195, called "Big Mike", to Julia Davis Park in 1959. In 1966, the city began developing the Boise River Greenbelt, and in 1972, the Boise Gallery of Art underwent an expansion. The Bob Gibb Friendship Bridge was built to connect the greenbelt, as well as the park, with Boise State University across the river in 1980. The Idaho Historical Museum grew in 1982, and in 1986, the Gallery of Art was renamed the Boise Art Museum during a renovation. By 1997, the art museum expanded to 34,800 square feet (3,230 m^{2}). A year later, the Idaho Black History Museum was established in the Old St. Baptist Church in 1998. In 2002, Jerry Snodgrass created a statue memorializing pioneers to the Boise area such as Julia Davis. A century after the park was established, a Centennial Celebration took place on June 23, 2007, and the city began a “Second Century” campaign to improve the park.

== Boise Art Museum ==
Founded in 1931 as an art association, the Boise Art Museum (BAM) organizes the appearance of fine art, and with assistance from Boise's local art scene, government, and the Idaho Parks and Recreation Department, the Boise Art Museum annually hosts “Art in the Park,” an event which brings together Boise's art scene and locally owned businesses.

== Idaho Black History Museum ==
Nestled next to the Julia Davis Park lies the Idaho Black History Museum. Built in 1995, the museum is the oldest black history museum in the Pacific Northwest. The museum, as well as Julia Davis Park, proves Idaho's rich foundation of history, diversity, and “reinvention”.

== Idaho State Historical Museum ==
The Idaho State Historical Museum is also located at the park. It was founded in 1907 and is operated by the Idaho State Historical Society. It contains exhibits on Native American, Basque, and Chinese culture.

== Rose Gardens ==
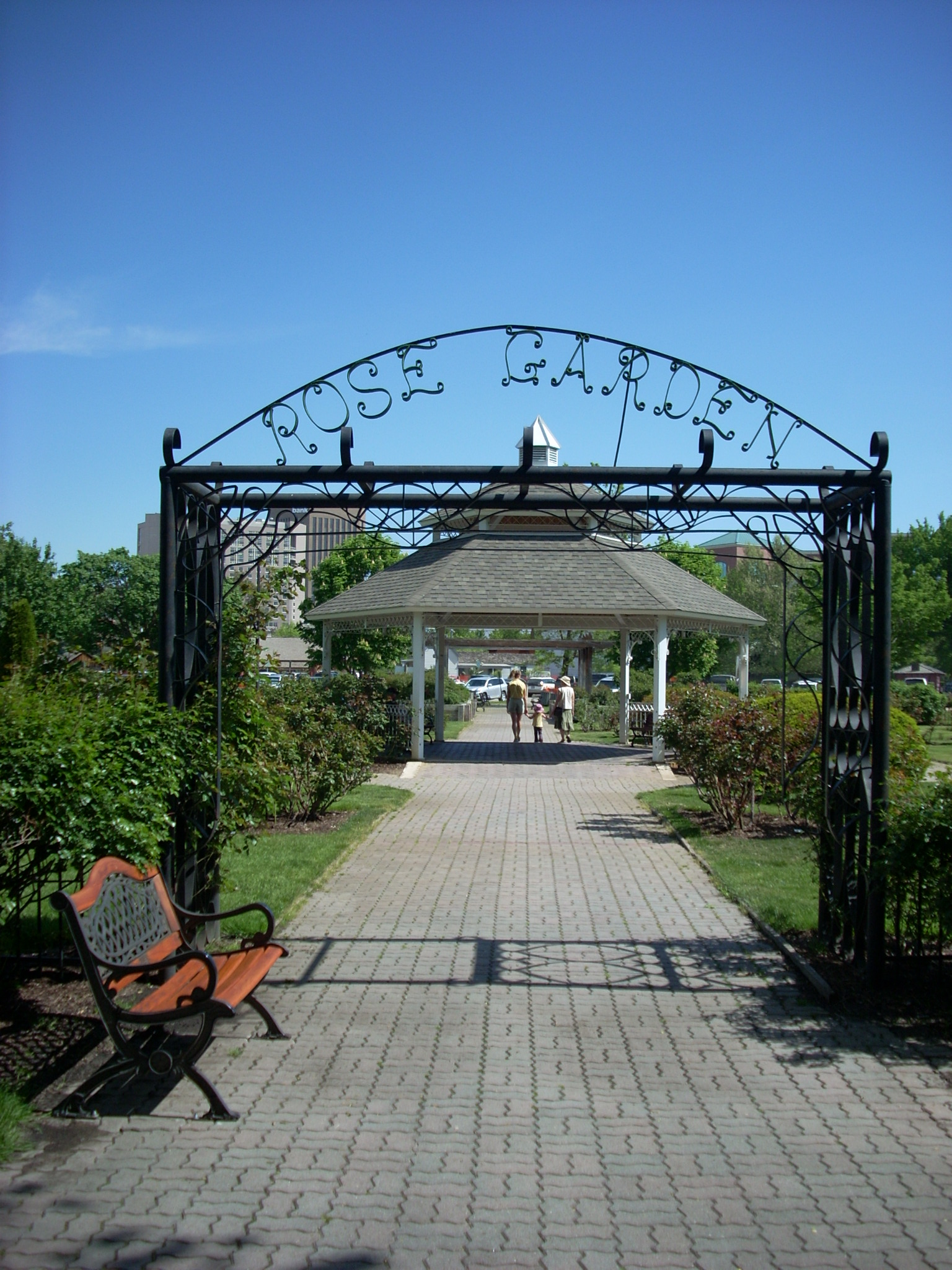
Julia Davis Rose Garden

The addition of a rose garden to the park originated with H.C. Schuppel in 1935, a chairman of a rose garden club called the "Cut Worms." Work on the project began in earnest in 1939 with a total of 2800 roses planted, some from Villa Nurseries in Portland, Oregon. The Rose Garden was officially dedicated that year.

A key development came later in 1979 with the establishment of the Memorial Rose Fund, which intended to help create memorials in the garden for friends and family members. National recognition was given to the Rose Garden in 1992 when it received its Public Rose Garden accreditation. As a result of this, 10 bushes of All American winners are given to the Garden yearly. The Garden is also often the site of wedding ceremonies.

== Discovery Center of Idaho ==
The Discovery Center of Idaho lies next to Julia Davis Park's pond and was completed in 1988. Its stated mission is to inspire lifelong interest and learning in science, technology, engineering and math.

== Bandshell ==
Located inside of Julia Davis Park is the Gene Harris Bandshell, initially built in 1928 and was later dedicated to Gene Harris in 2001. The bandshell plays multiple free concerts for park visitors weekly. The Velvet Underground, Bob Marley and the Wailers, and Pete Seeger have performed at the Bandshell.

== Zoo Boise ==
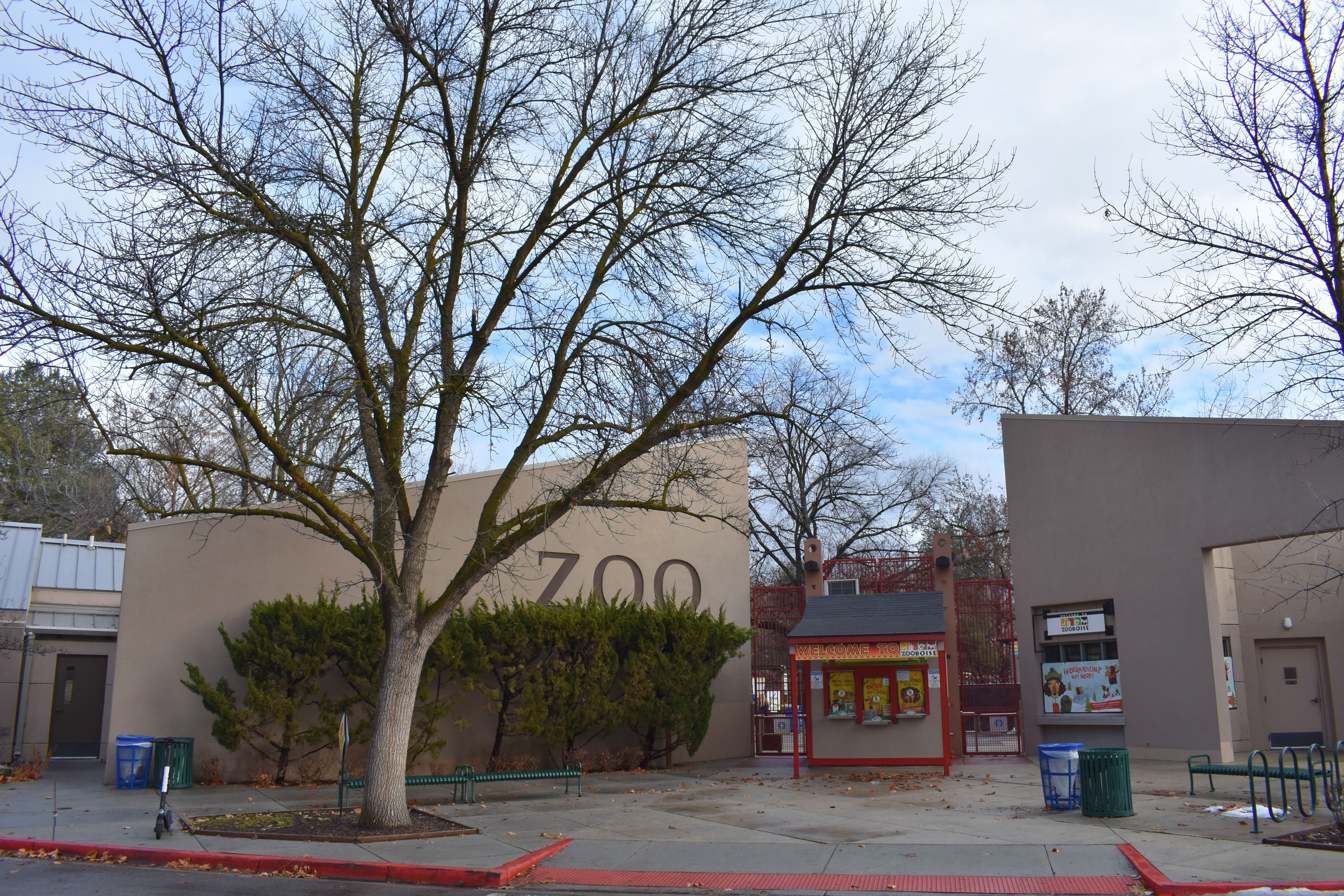
Zoo Boise.

While a circus traveled through Mountain Home in 1916, a monkey escaped from captivity. The monkey was found in the Mountain Home Desert after the circus's departure. As Boise became the home for the monkey, a zoo was founded. The zoo includes a $2.8 Million African Plains exhibit that opened in 2008 and includes an African Village, three small exhibit areas that house rock hyrax, weaver birds, and lemurs, as well as two large exhibit areas that house African lions, striped hyenas, giraffes, zebras, amur leopard, snow leopard, penguins, red pandas, and tigers. The zoo also features a primate building and an aviary.

In 2018 construction started on a 3 acre expansion focusing on Gorongosa National Park in Mozambique, bringing the zoo total acreage of exhibits to be close to 17. The new exhibit opened in the summer of 2019 and includes the addition of olive baboons, African painted dogs, vervet monkeys, crocodiles, warthogs and more. In addition, the old primate house near the front of the zoo and buildings around that were demolished and a modern new plaza with exhibits for gibbons and sarus cranes were constructed. Since the new exhibits opened the zoo has seen attendance of 350,000 plus annually.

Zoo Boise is home to the Zoo Boise Conservation fund administered by Friends of Zoo Boise. In the past decade, the fund has contributed over $3 million to conservation locally and globally, including a variety of projects in Mozambique, locally in and around Boise and throughout Asia and Central America. Each year, the zoo contributes more than 10% of all of its revenue to conservation.

In May 2025, Zoo Boise unveiled a new world-class red panda exhibit designed to mimic the species’ natural Himalayan habitat, featuring enhanced climbing structures and sustainable design elements.

== Future plans ==
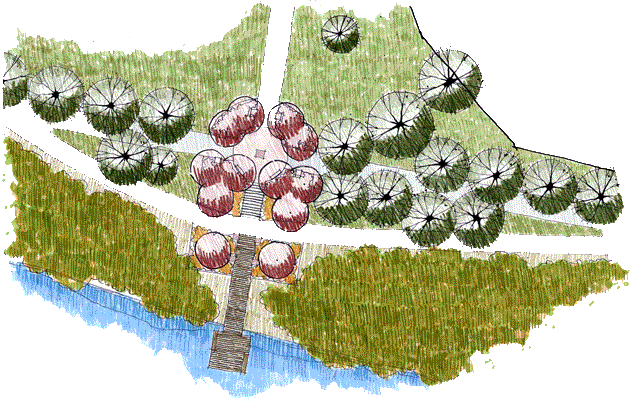
Plan for a Julia Davis River Node

Projects underway in Julia Davis Park include a new “Grand Plaza” for large events and gatherings, a history walk amongst several new pavilions, the addition of four new river nodes, and a new “Golden Apple” interactive history tour. The Grand Plaza is planned to take the form of a broken circle centered on a bronze medallion inset into the pavement and is intended to provide social and operational space. Five new or refurbished pavilions will be built to provide a picnic area, concert center, and gathering space.

Each of the five river nodes is intended to bring out the beauty and reflective nature of Boise's wildlife, brush, and river. The nodes will be centered on a pedestal made of stained steel and copper and will have information on the park's history. There will be a history walk linking the different sites with historical information, and a “Quest for the Golden Apple” which will have thirteen stops with information on Idaho history and nature.

== Gallery ==
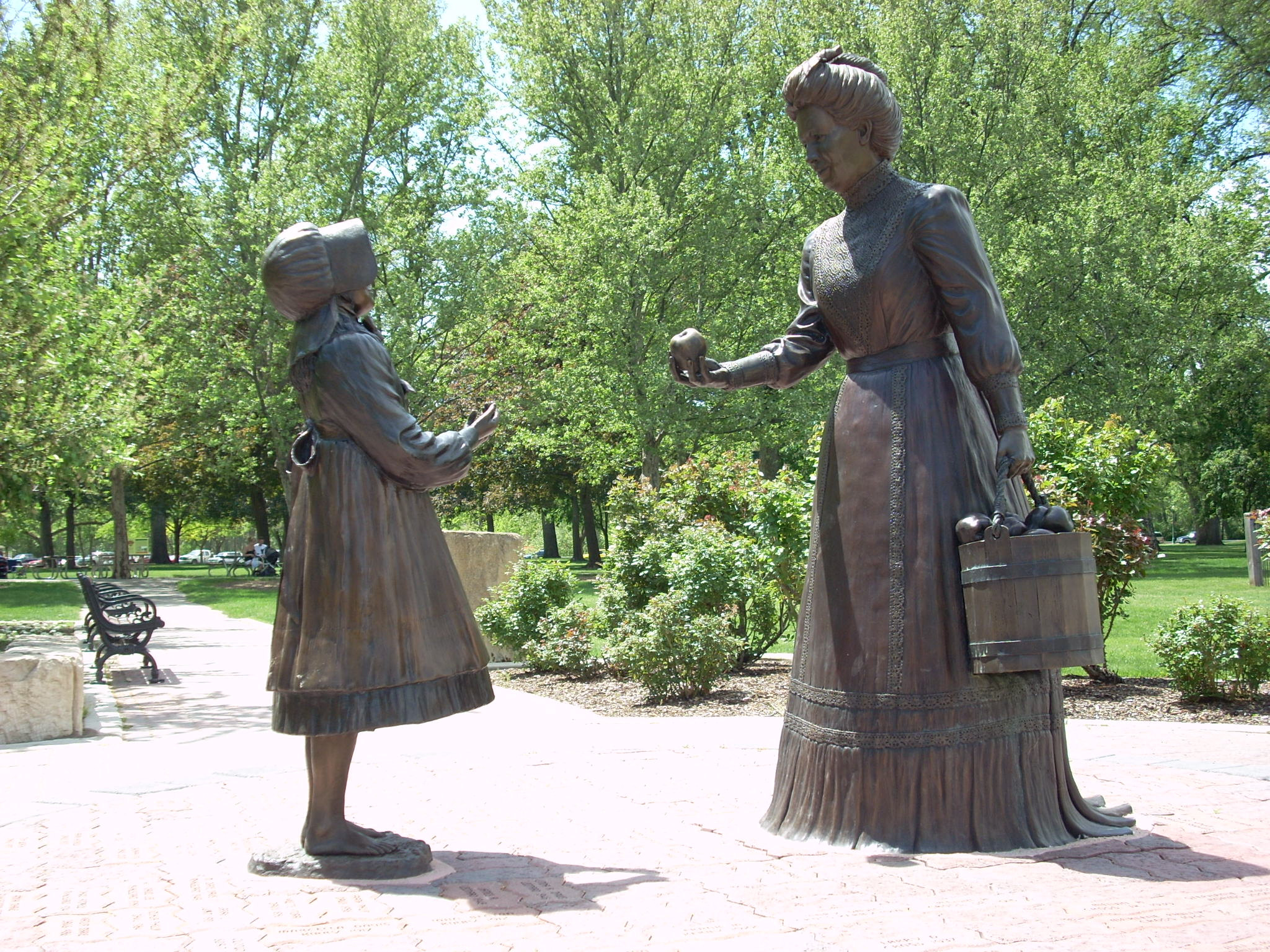
Statue of Julia Davis

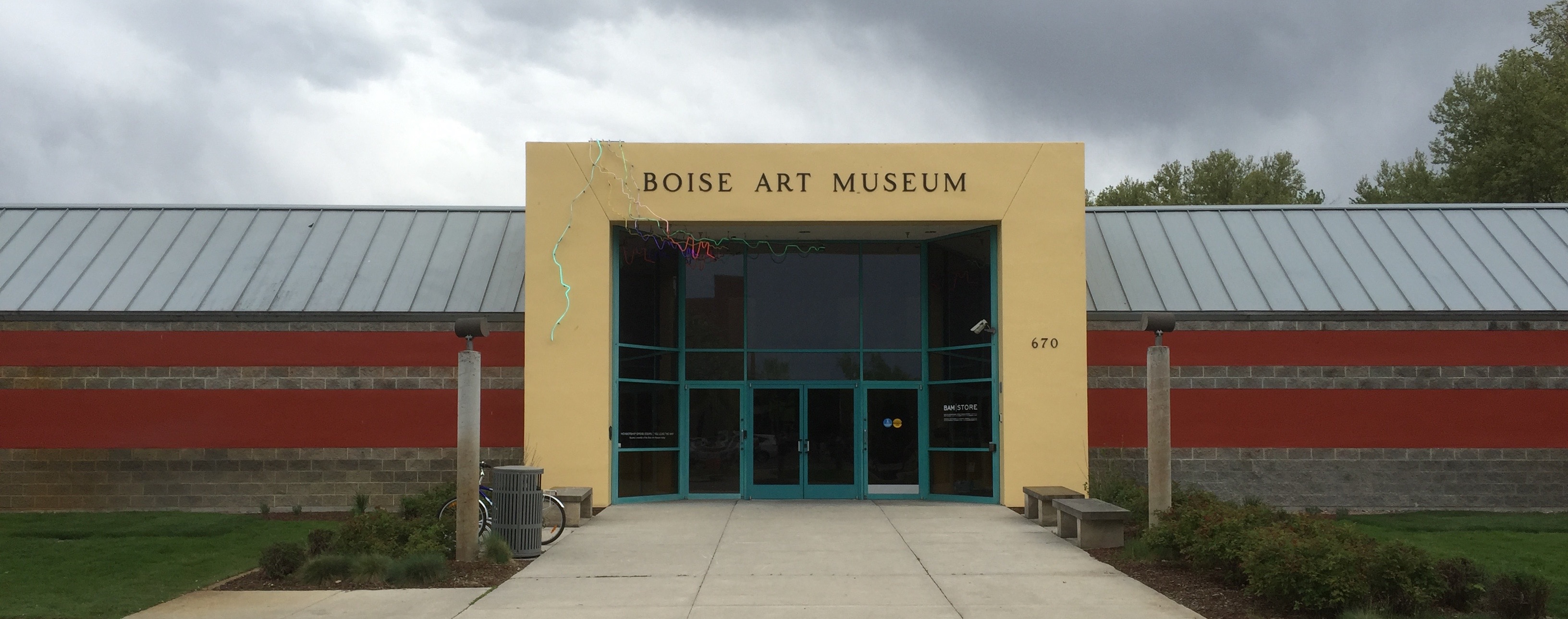
Boise Art Museum

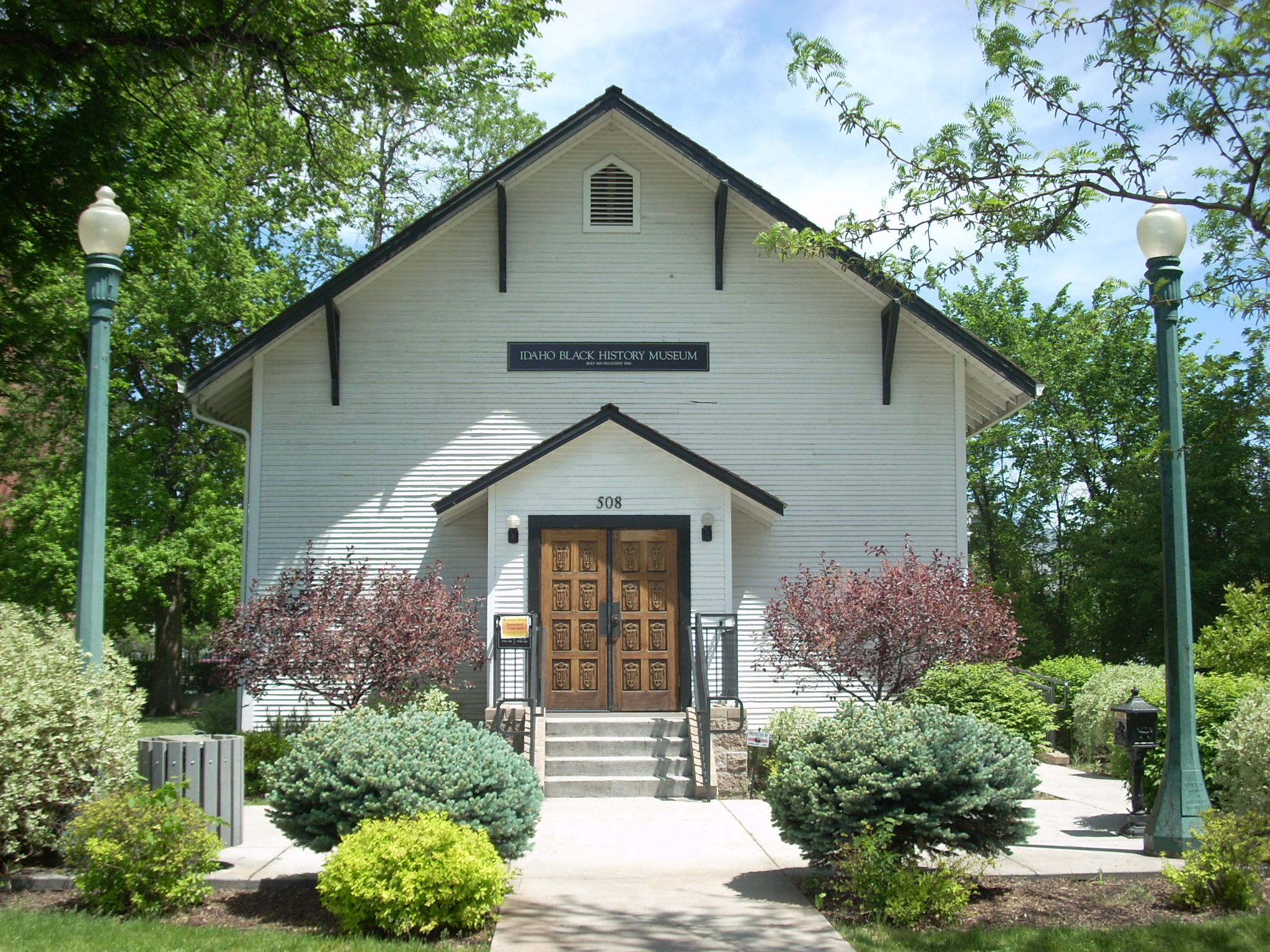
Idaho Black History Museum

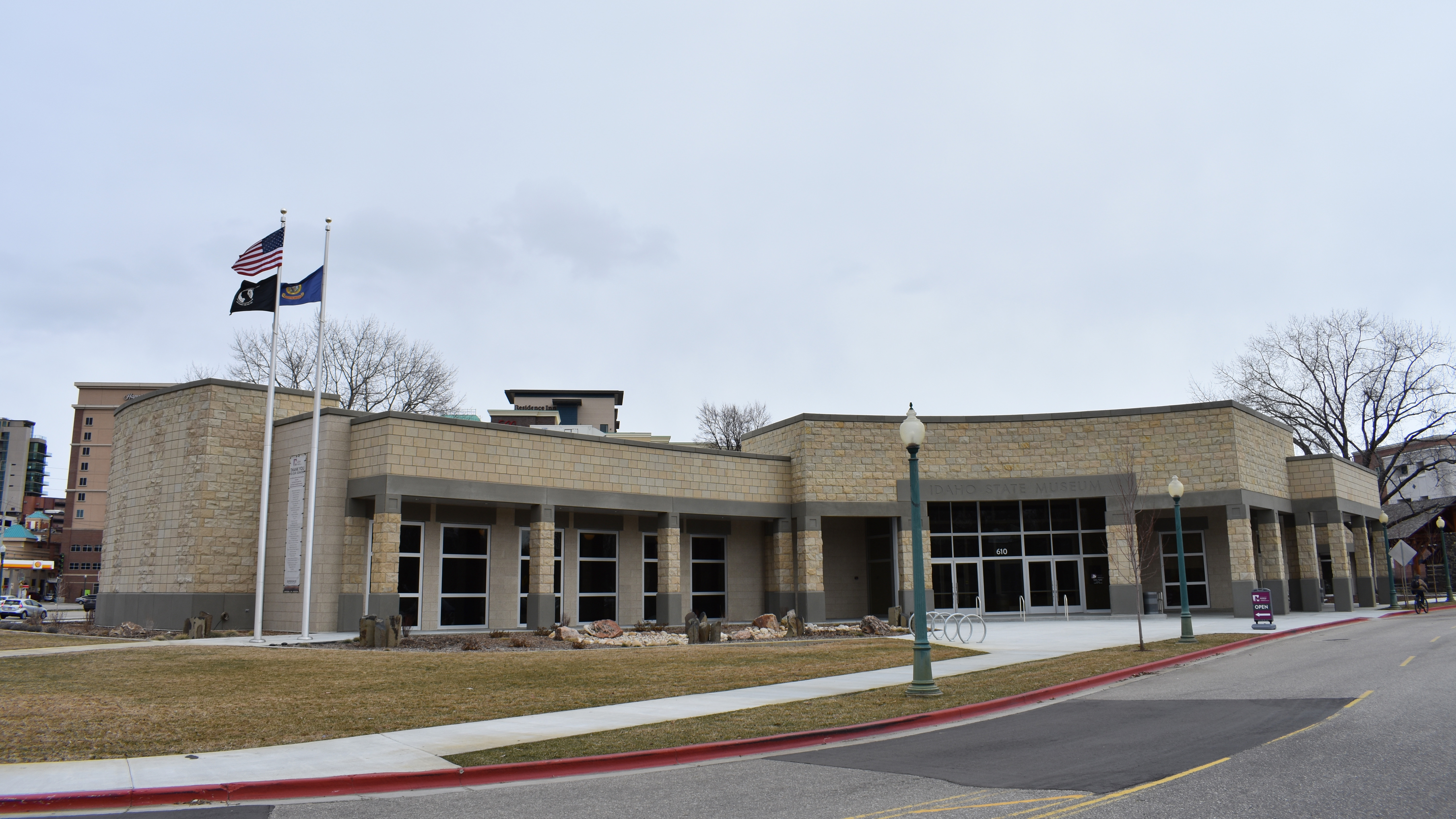
Idaho State Historical Museum

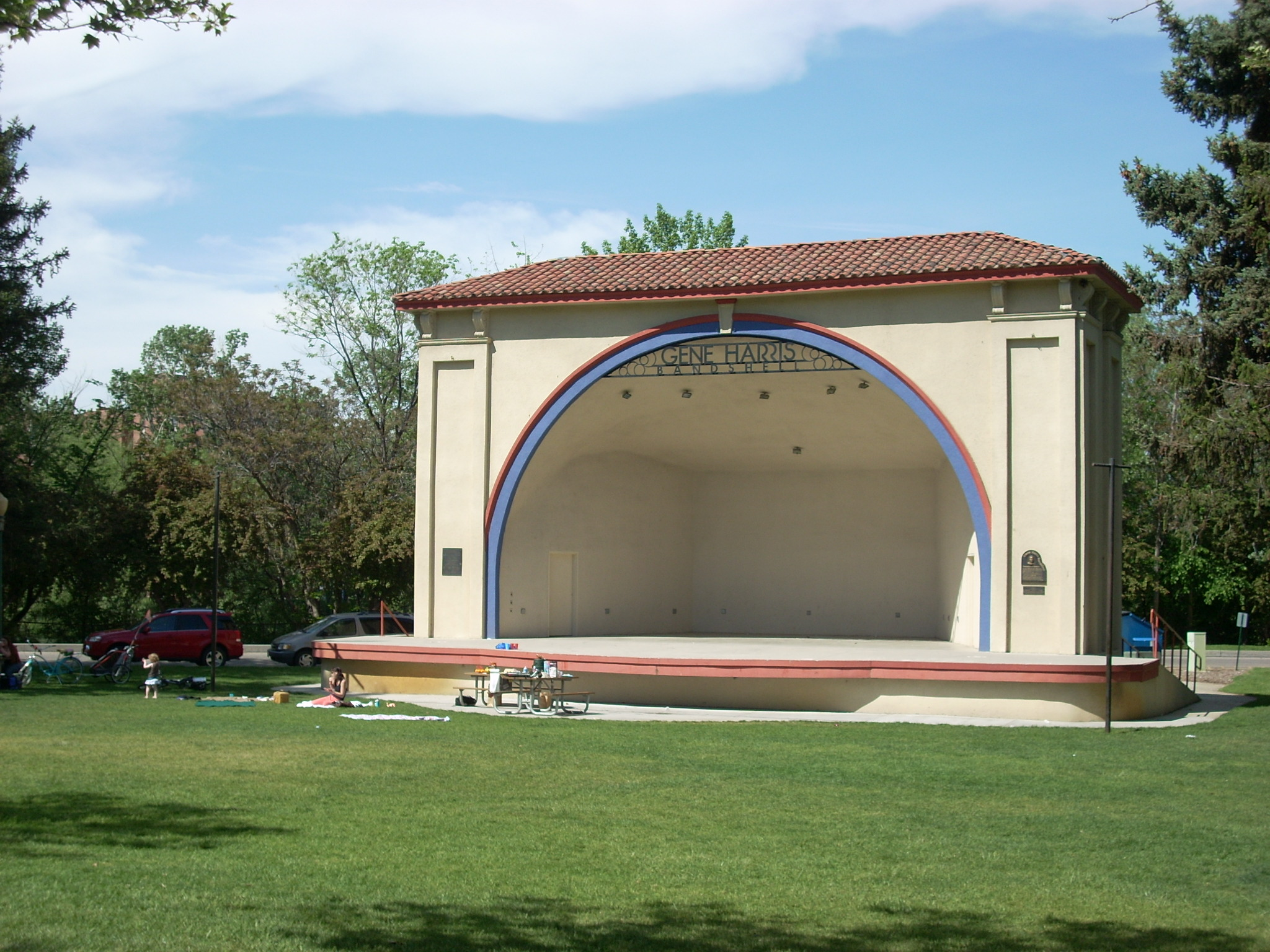
Gene Harris Bandshell

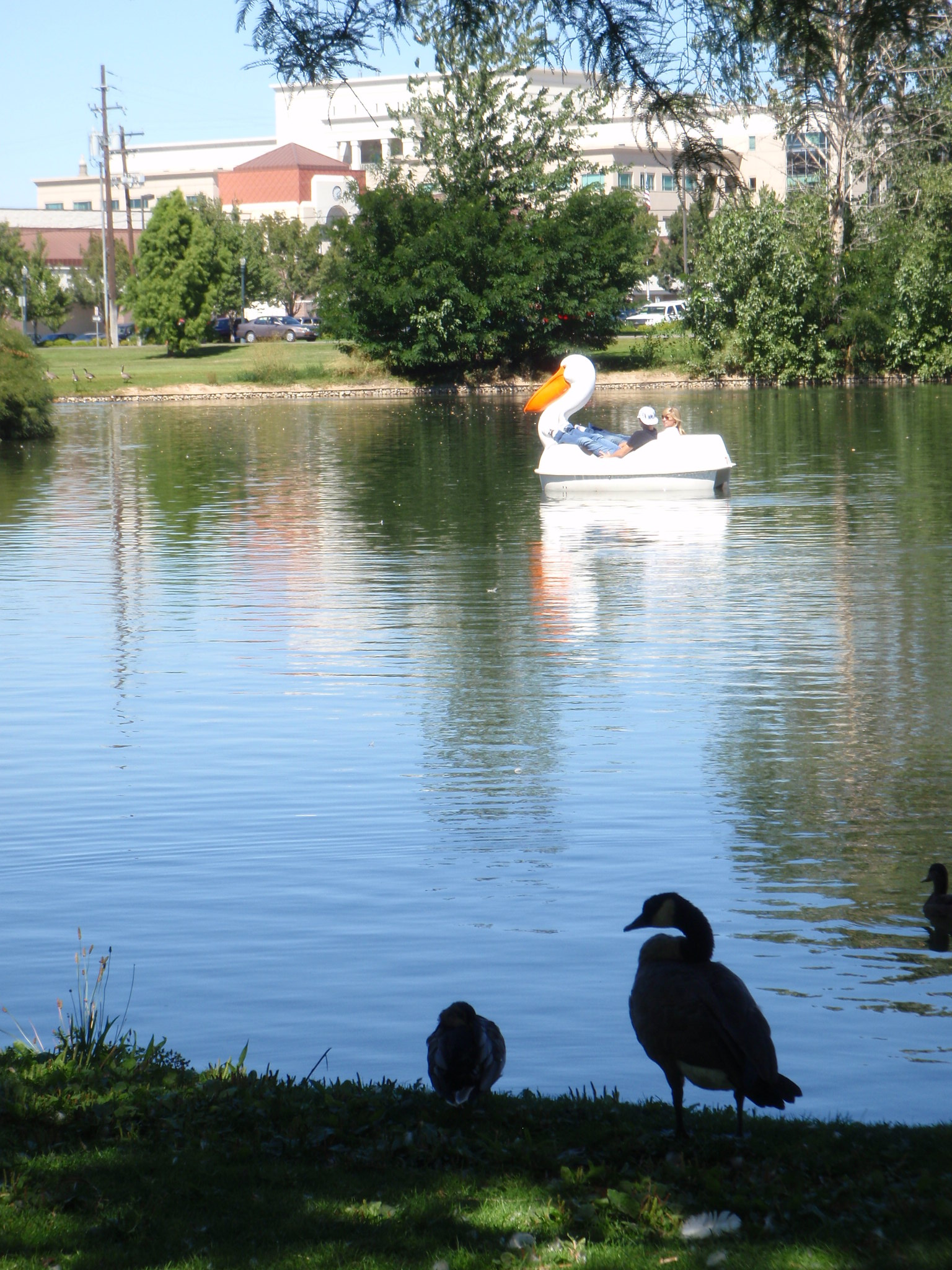
Julia Davis Pond

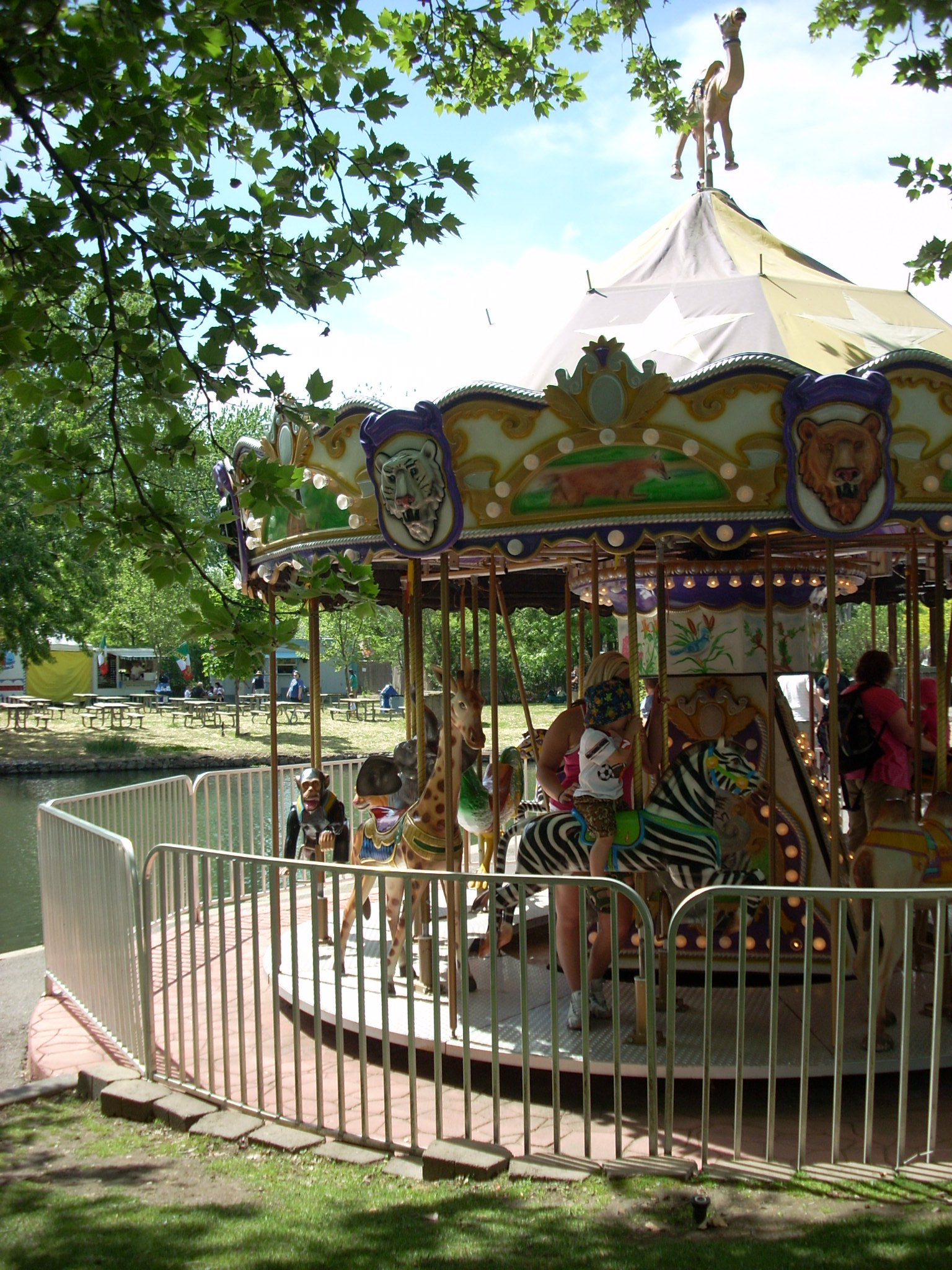
Carousel in Zoo Boise

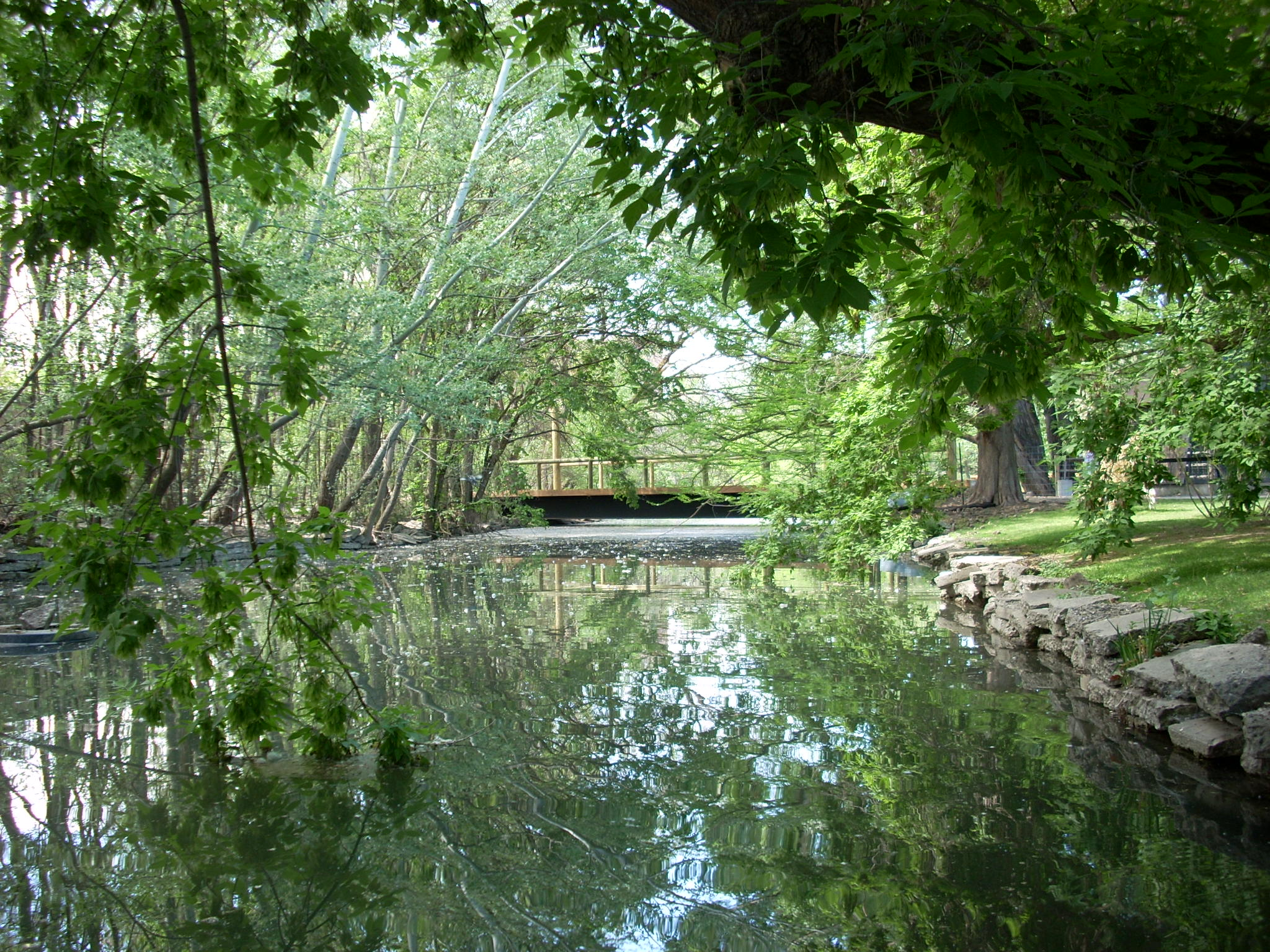
Stream in Zoo Boise

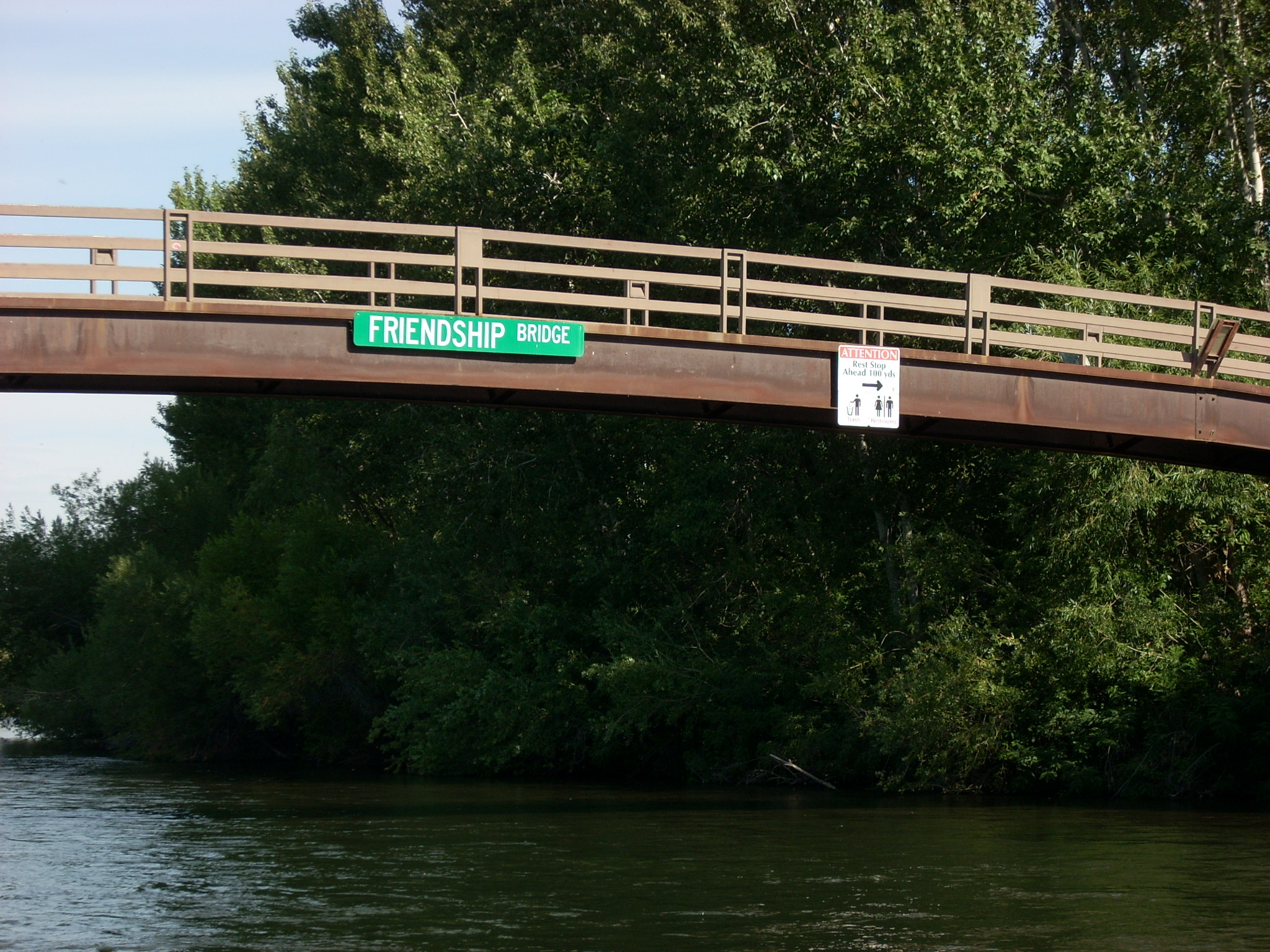
The Friendship Bridge connecting the park with the Boise State University campus

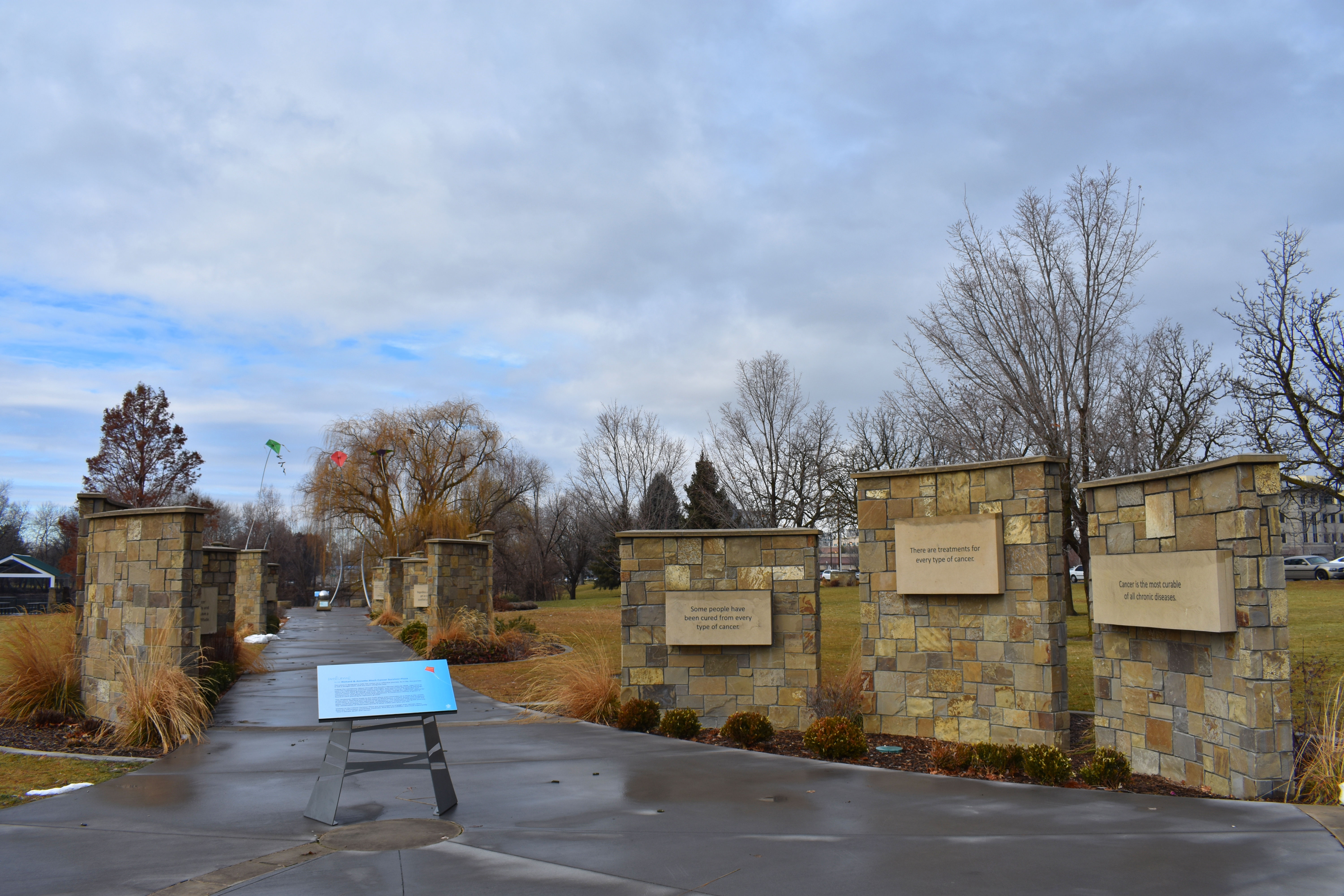
Cancer Survivors Park with kinetic wind sculpture

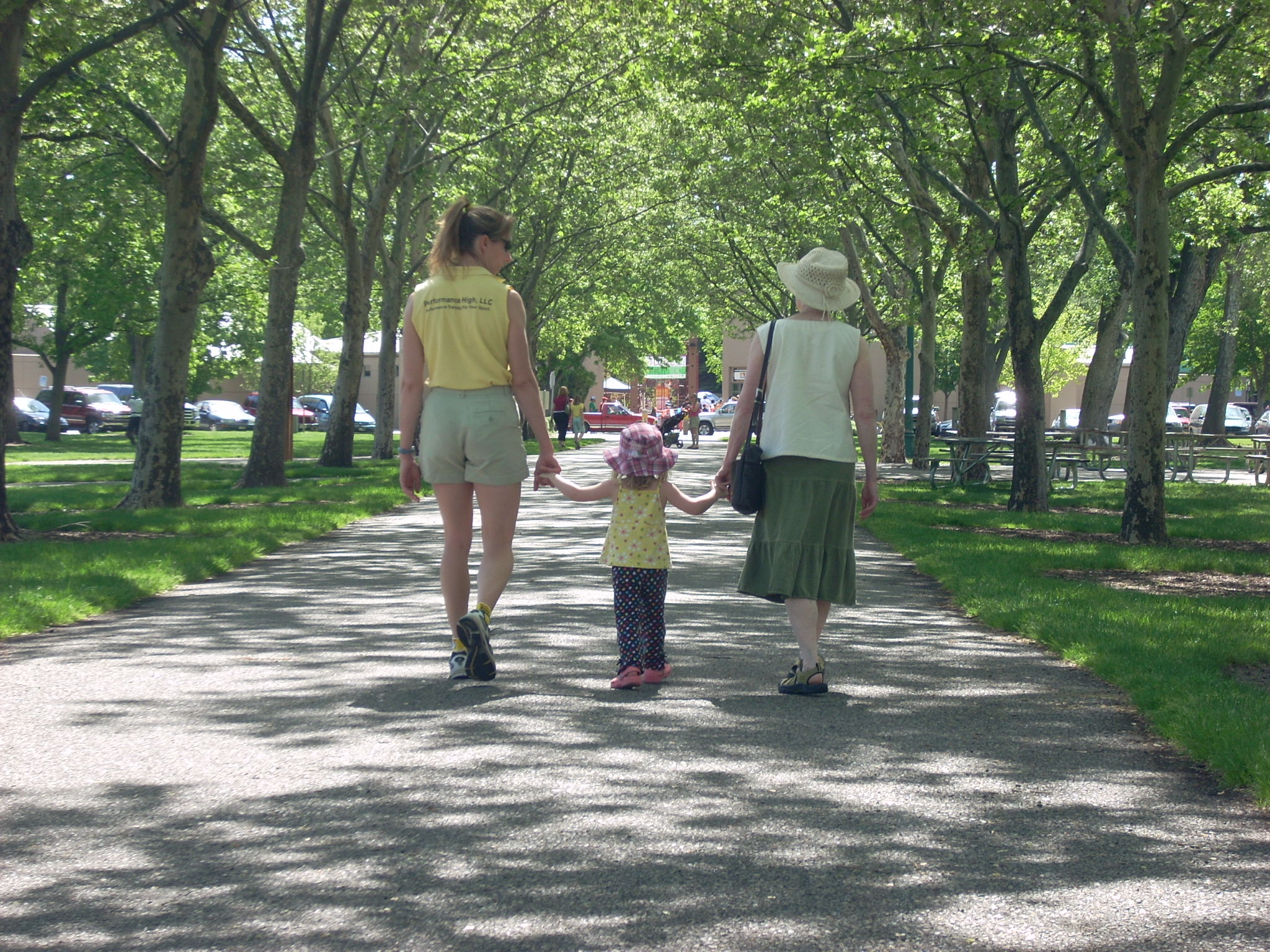
A family walking in the park

== See also ==
- List of parks in Boise
