= Hyde Park, Boise, Idaho =

- Hyde Park Historic District
- U.S. National Register of Historic Places
- U.S. Historic district
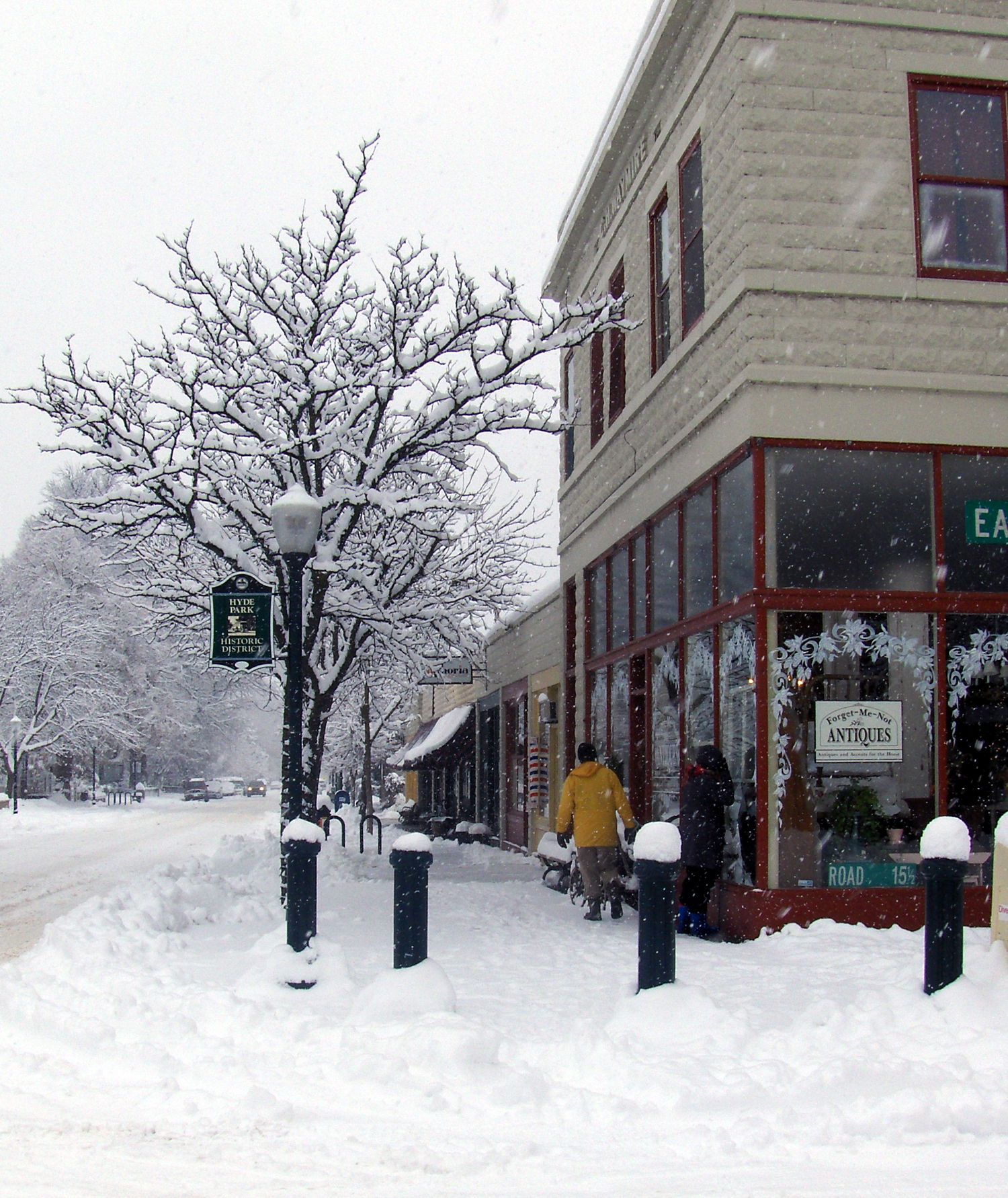

- Location within Idaho Location within the United States
- Location: Boise, Idaho
- Coordinates: 43°37′48″N 116°12′12″W
- Architect: Tourtellotte & Hummel
- Architectural style: Colonial Revival, Queen Anne
- NRHP reference No.: 82000211
- Added to NRHP: October 29, 1982

Hyde Park, also called the Hyde Park Historic District, is a section of the North End neighborhood in Boise, Idaho known for its several popular eateries and locally owned specialty shops. Located on North 13th Street a few blocks north of Downtown Boise, the Hyde Park Historic District was added to the National Register of Historic Places in 1982.

During all months of the year, local merchants host neighborhood events and activities. The biggest event Hyde Park is known for is the Hyde Park Street Fair, an annual event located at the nearby Camel's Back Park that is organized by the North End Neighborhood Association and includes vendors, food, live music, demonstrations, a children's area, and a parade.
