= Kristin Armstrong Municipal Park =

Park in Boise, Idaho, United States

- Boise Municipal Park
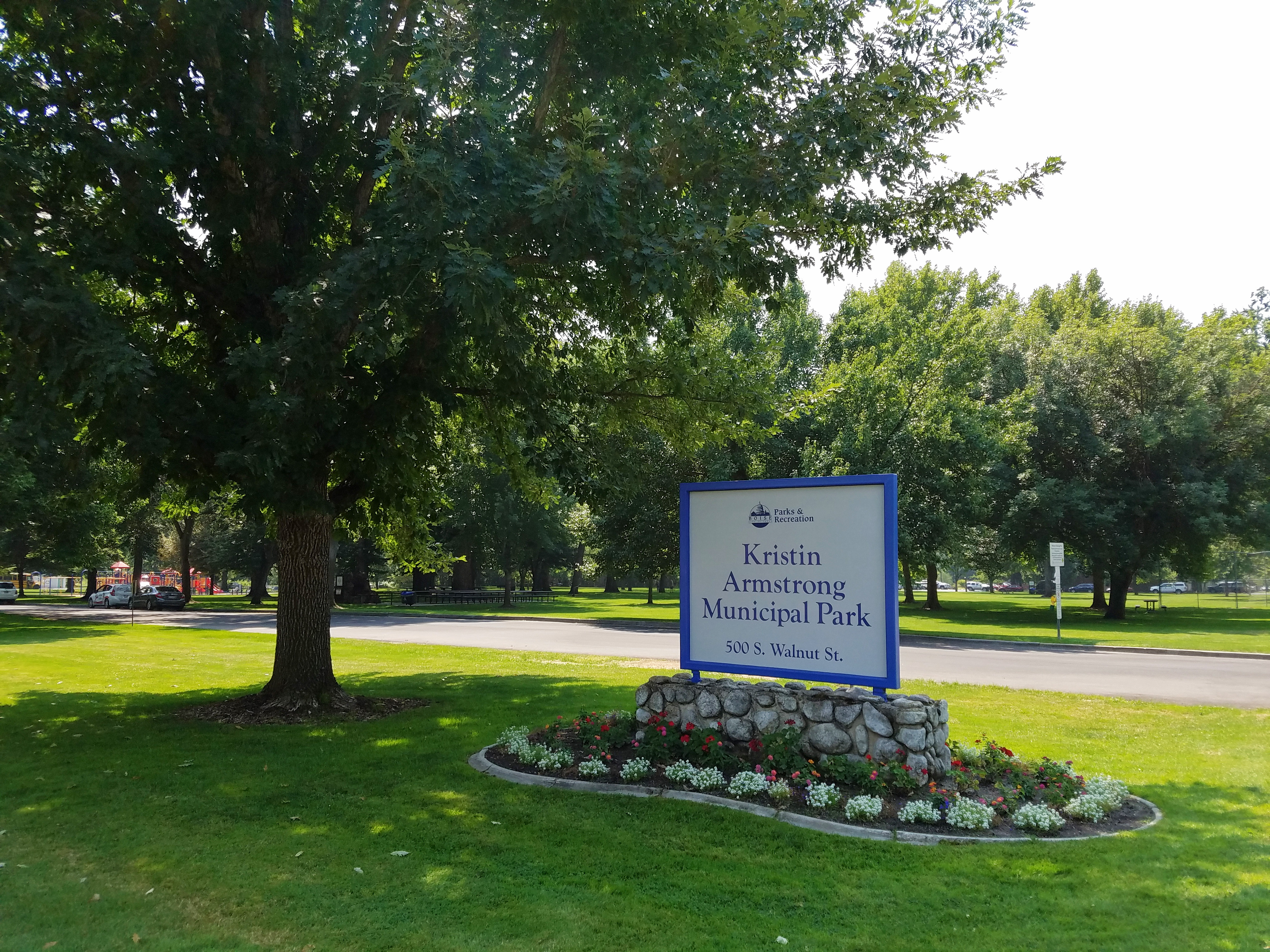
- Kristin Armstrong Municipal Park
- Interactive map of Kristin Armstrong Municipal Park
- Type: Urban park
- Location: 500 S Walnut St. Boise, Idaho
- Coordinates: 43.603°N 116.185°W
- Area: 28 acres (0.11 km^{2})
- Created: 1918; 108 years ago
- Operator: Boise Parks and Recreation

Kristin Armstrong Municipal Park is a 28-acre (11 ha) urban park in the western United States, along the Boise River in Boise, Idaho. The park is managed by the Boise Parks and Recreation Department and includes picnic facilities, bocce courts, and a playground.

The elevation of the park is approximately 2,700 feet (825 m) above sea level.

== History ==
The park was constructed 108 years ago in 1918 by the Boise Commercial Club on land leased from the Boise School District. It operated under the name, Boise Tourist Campground, and it featured overnight camping facilities. The campground was closed briefly in 1938, but the property reopened as a day use urban park under the name, Boise Municipal Park.

Airway Park, later "Braves Field," was the city's minor league baseball park from 1939 through 1963. The land was formerly the southwest portion of Municipal Park; the wooden venue was razed and the site became the headquarters of the Idaho Department of Fish and Game.

In 2016, the park was rededicated in honor of three-time Olympic gold medalist Kristin Armstrong.

== See also ==
- List of parks in Boise
