= Ann Morrison Park =

Park in Boise, Idaho

- Ann Morrison Memorial Park
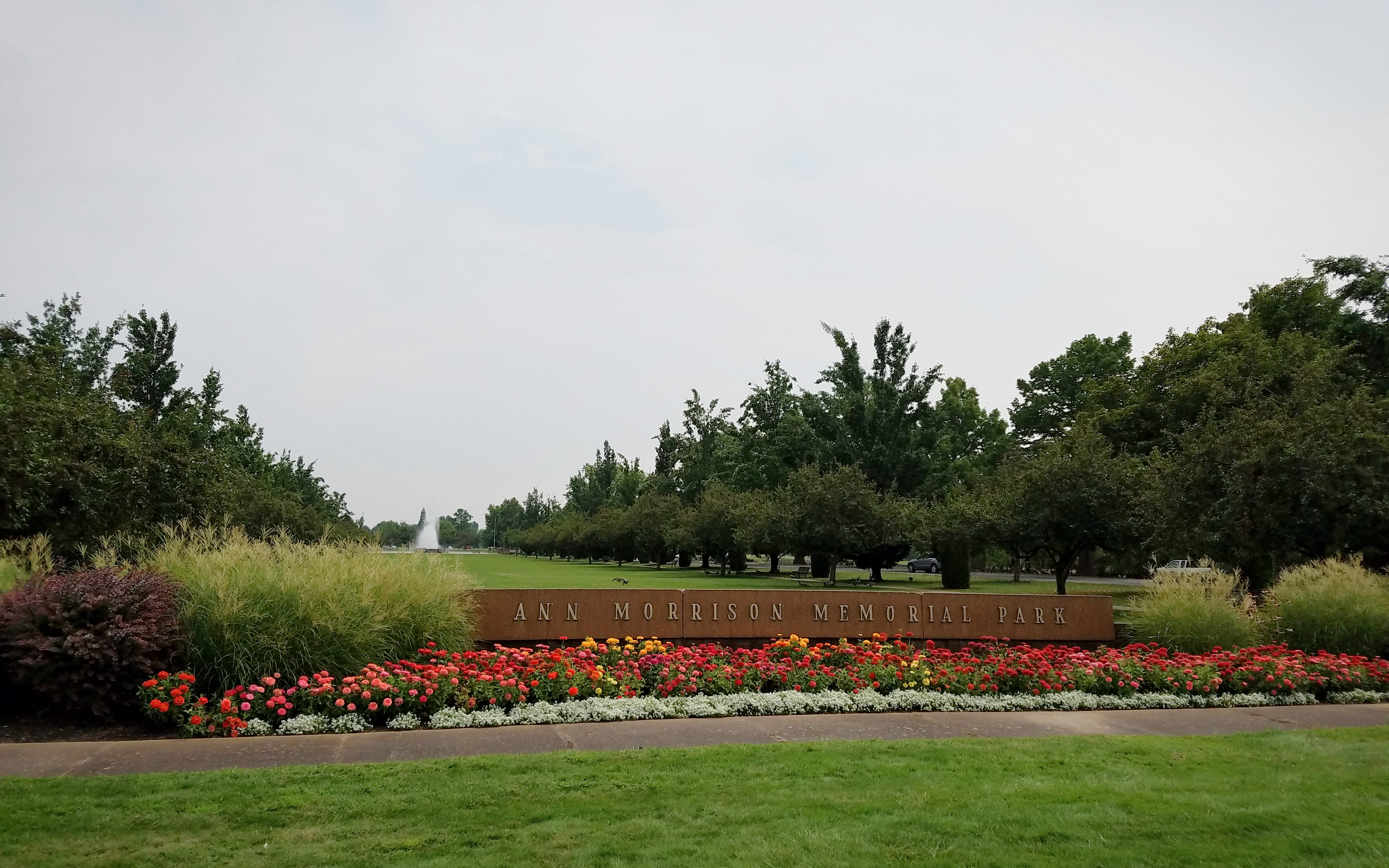
- Ann Morrison Park Americana Boulevard entrance
- Interactive map of Ann Morrison Park
- Type: Urban park
- Location: 1000 S Americana Blvd; Boise, Idaho
- Coordinates: 43°36′49″N 116°13′26″W
- Area: 153 acres (62 ha)
- Created: 1959
- Operator: Boise Parks and Recreation

Ann Morrison Park is a 153-acre (62 ha) urban park along the Boise River in Boise, Idaho. The park is managed by the Boise Parks and Recreation Department and includes picnic facilities, bocce courts, a disc golf course, horseshoe pits, an outdoor gym, a volleyball court, a playground, tennis courts, and fields for softball, soccer, cricket, and football. During the summer, people host events such as picnics, fireworks, and races. This park also acts as a take out spot for tubers that are floating the Boise River.

== History ==
Ann Morrison Park was constructed in 1959 on land purchased from the Boise School District. Workers from the Morrison-Knudsen company built the park with funds provided by the Morrison Family Foundation, and the park is named in memory of Ann Daly Morrison, spouse of Morrison-Knudsen cofounder Harry W. Morrison.

== See also ==
- List of parks in Boise
