= Camel's Back Park =

Park in Boise, Idaho, US

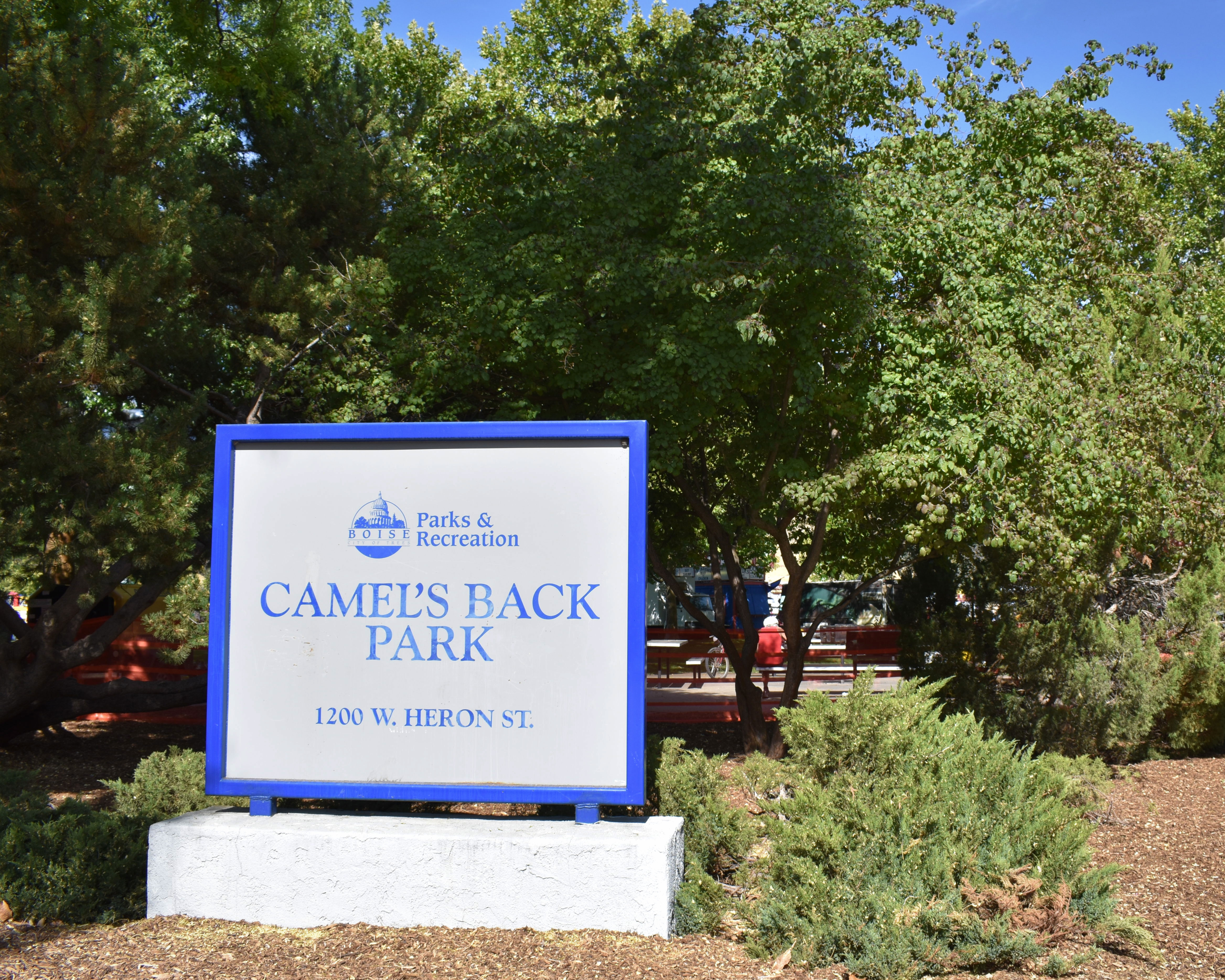
- Camel's Back Park, Heron St. entrance
- Interactive map of Camel's Back Park
- Type: Urban park
- Location: 1200 W Heron St. Boise, Idaho
- Coordinates: 43°38′07″N 116°12′18″W
- Area: 11 acres (4.5 ha)
- Created: 1932
- Opened: 1965
- Operator: Boise Parks and Recreation

Camel's Back Park is an 11-acre (4.5 ha) urban park in Boise, Idaho, managed by the Boise Parks and Recreation Department. The park includes picnic tables, play areas, an outdoor gym, practice fields, and facilities for tennis and volleyball. The park is adjacent to the 63-acre (25 ha) Camel's Back Reserve and the 292-acre (118 ha) Hulls Gulch Reserve.

== History ==
Property for Camel's Back Park and Camel's Back Reserve was donated in 1932 by Bernard Lemp, son of Boise pioneer and mayor (1875-1876) John Lemp. The park was dedicated officially in 1965.

An outdoor gym was installed in the park by Bodybuilding.com in 2015.

City planners addressed dangerous erosion at the park in 2016, and in 2017 a series of landings and stone steps were installed at the top of Camel Back chute, the steepest section of foothill trail access from the park.

== See also ==
- List of parks in Boise
