= Veterans Memorial Park (Boise, Idaho) =

Park in Idaho, United States

- Veterans Memorial State Park
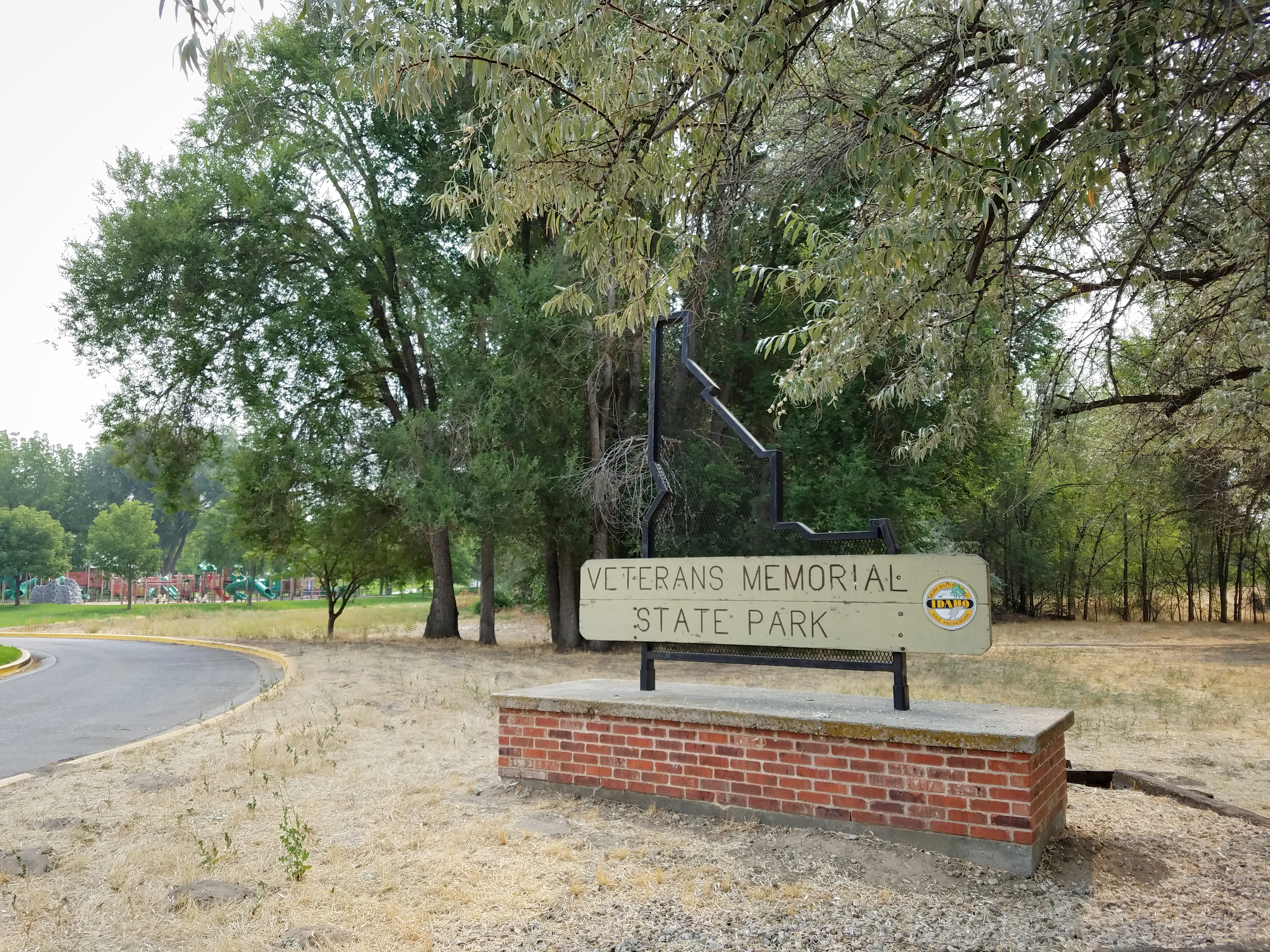
- Park entrance
- Interactive map of Veterans Memorial Park
- Type: Urban park
- Location: 930 N Veterans Memorial Pkwy; Boise, Idaho
- Coordinates: 43°38′06″N 116°14′22″W
- Area: 38 acres (15 ha)
- Created: 1976
- Operator: Boise Parks and Recreation

Veterans Memorial Park is a 38-acre (15 ha) urban park along the Boise River in Boise, Idaho, United States. The park is managed by the Boise Parks and Recreation Department and includes picnic facilities, play areas, and memorials to veterans and fallen soldiers. Although managed by Boise Parks and Recreation, Veterans Memorial Park is not a city park but an Idaho state park.

== History ==
The park was constructed on the site of the former Idaho Soldiers Home. Also known as the Old Soldier's Home, the facility opened in 1895 and closed in 1966. Veterans Memorial State Park opened on the property in 1976.

== See also ==
- List of parks in Boise
