= Jefferson Hall =

Jefferson Hall may refer to:

- Jefferson Hall (University of Virginia), a building at the University of Virginia, in Charlottesville, Virginia
- Jefferson Hall (Union Point, Georgia), listed on the National Register of Historic Places (NRHP) in Greene County
- Jefferson Hall (Detroit), a demolished apartment building in Detroit that is NRHP-listed
- Jefferson Hall (actor), British actor

== See also ==
- Jefferson House (disambiguation)
