= Timeline of Boise, Idaho =

City history timeline

Coordinates: 43.613739°N 116.237651°W

The following is a timeline of the history of the city of Boise, Idaho, United States.

== 19th century ==
- Pre-colonization – Area inhabited by Boise Valley Shoshone and Bannock Tribes, a part of the "Snake Country"
- 1811 – Wilson Hunt's expedition in search of Fur trade routes becomes the first White American settler to visit the area
- 1818 – "Joint-Occupation" of the region by the United Kingdom and the United States, in practice the region remained free of Settler incursions and HBC had a monopoly
- 1846 – British relinquishing of its claim, US takeover and establishment of "Oregon Territory.
- 1848 – Passage of Donation Land Claim Act Increasing settler incursion en route to the Pacific Coast of Oregon
- 1854 – Ward Massacre, the killing of 21 settlers in an attack on a 6-wagon caravan.
- 1863 – Gold mines discovered in the area. Fort Boise established by United States Army.
- 1864 – October 10: Governor of the territory and Boise Valley Shoshone tribe sign a treaty in which the tribe gives up the control of the land upon which Boise is located. Treaty was never ratified by Congress.
- 1864 – Idaho Tri-Weekly Statesman newspaper begins publication.

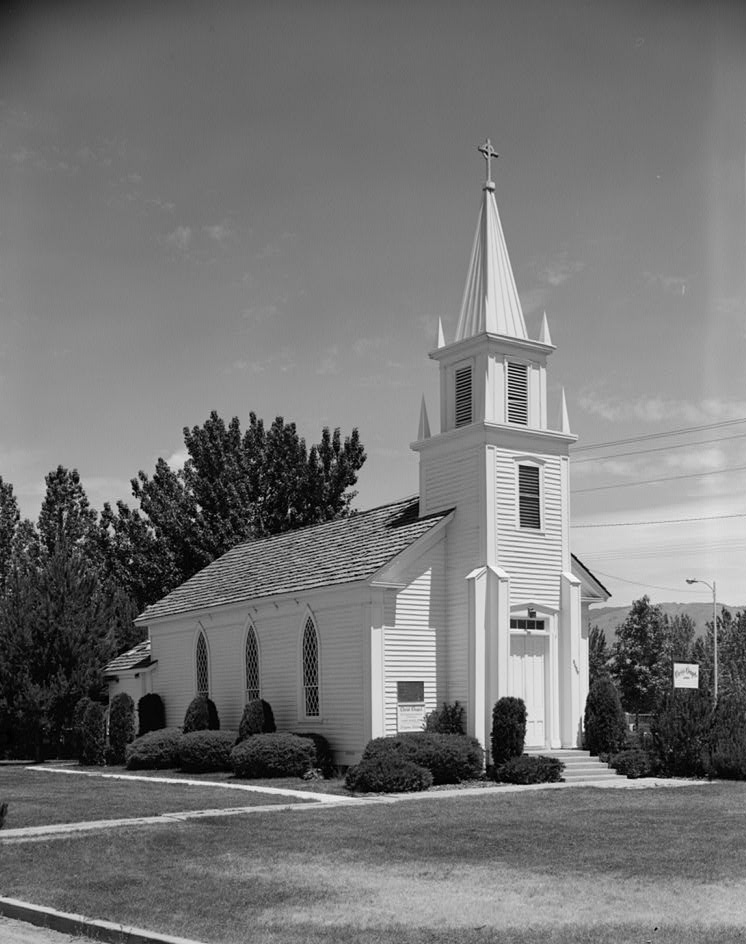
Christ Chapel was constructed in 1866 and was added to the National Register of Historic Places in 1974.

- 1864 – December 7: Boise designated capital of Idaho Territory.
- 1866 – Christ Chapel built.
- 1866 – (Lasted until 1868) Start of the unofficial Snake War between settler residents and the US Military on one side, and indigenous peoples of Boise Valley on the other. Statistically, the deadliest of the Indian Wars in the West in terms of casualties.
- 1867 – Henry E. Prickett becomes mayor.
- 1869 – "Idaho's Trail of Tears", forced expulsion of Boise Valley Shoshone and Bannock Tribes to Fort Hall Reservation
- 1870 – Territorial Prison built.
- 1871 – Assay Office (Boise, Idaho) built.
- 1881 – Historical Society of Idaho Pioneers organized.
- 1882 - Boise High School first opened.
- 1892 – Boise Chamber of Commerce was formed with James Pinney as the first president.
- 1886 - Anti-Chinese convention held
- 1890
  - Boise becomes capital of new State of Idaho.
  - Population: 2,311.
- 1892 – Woman's Columbian Club organized.
  - Boise Sentinel newspaper begins publication.
- 1896 – Ahavath Beth Israel synagogue built.
- 1897 – Idaho Intermountain Fair begins.

== 20th century ==
- 1900 – Population: 5,957.
- 1901 – Idanha Hotel opens
- 1902 - Boise High School building replaced. "Not the well-known white brick building present today, but traditional red brick, typical of the time period. The cornerstone was laid in 1902."
- 1905 – Carnegie Public Library opens
- 1906 – Boise Commercial Club organized

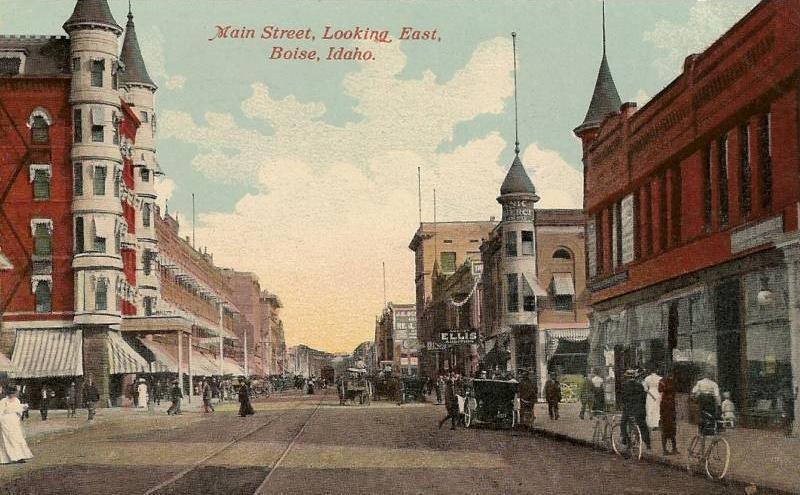
Main Street in 1911

- 1907 – Julia Davis Park established
- 1908 – Pinney Theatre opens
  - Swedish Lutheran Church built
- 1909 – College Women's Club organized
- 1910 – YWCA organized
  - Population: 17,358.
- 1912 – Idaho State Capitol opens (first phase)
- 1913 – Idaho Labor Herald and New Freedom newspapers begin publication.
  - Boise-Payette Lumber Company in business

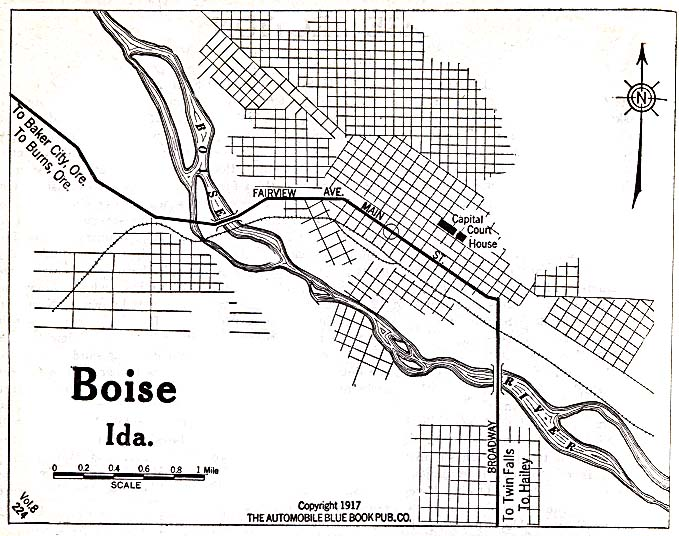
Map of Boise in 1917

- 1920 – Population: 21,393
- 1921 – St. John's Cathedral completed
- 1925 – Union Pacific Depot opens
  - Idaho Country Club founded, became Hillcrest in 1940
- 1926 – Airfield in operation, at present site of Boise State University
- 1927 – Egyptian Theatre opens
- 1928 – Bandshell built in Julia Davis Park
- 1930 - Idaho's First Skyscraper Hotel Boise completed. (Named Hoff Building in 1976.)
- 1932 – Boise Junior College opens
  - Idaho Legionnaire newspaper begins publication
- 1938 – Boise Airport moves to present site
- 1939 – Rose Garden dedicated in Julia Davis Park
  - First Albertsons supermarket opens
- 1940 – Hillcrest Country Club opens at former Idaho Country Club
  - State Funeral of U.S. Senator William Borah; 23,000 pass bier in state capitol

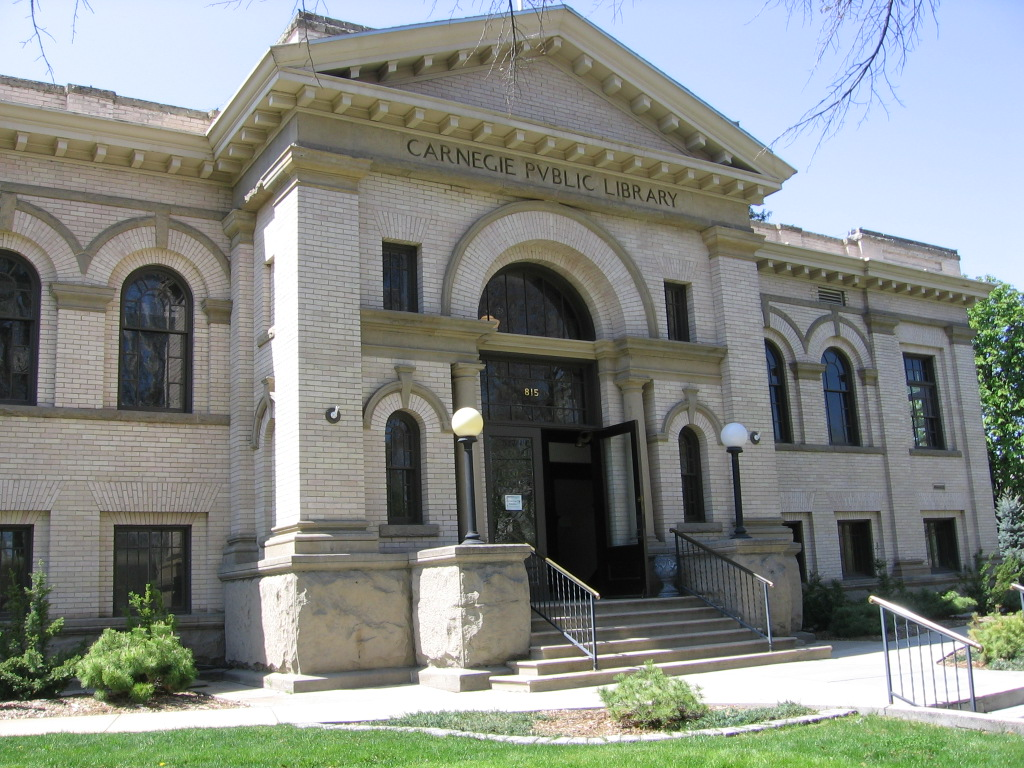
Boise's Carnegie Public Library opened in 1905 on Washington St. and remained at that site until the library moved in 1973.

- 1955 – Boise homosexuality scandal begins
- 1957 – Boise Cascade headquartered in Boise
  - - The first computer in Boise installed at the Department of Highways
- 1958 – Second public high school, Borah, opens
- 1960 – Population: 34,481
- 1964 – Bishop Kelly High School opens
- 1965 – Third public high school, Capital, opens
- 1968 – Boise Greenbelt plan adopted
- 1969 – Boise College becomes Boise State College
- 1970 – New Bronco Stadium opens, constructed in less than a year.
  - Population: 74,990
- 1971 - The Boise Redevelopment Agency purchased and demolished the remaining core of Boise's Chinatown.
- 1972 – St. Alphonsus Hospital moves to present site from downtown
- 1973 – Boise Co-op founded.
  - State Penitentiary closes
- 1974 – Boise State College becomes Boise State University and Boise Bible College established.
- 1975 – One Capital Center opens
  - Boise A's minor league baseball team begins play (two seasons)
- 1976 – Old St. Alphonsus Hospital arson, later razed.
- 1977 – Idaho Shakespeare Festival begins.

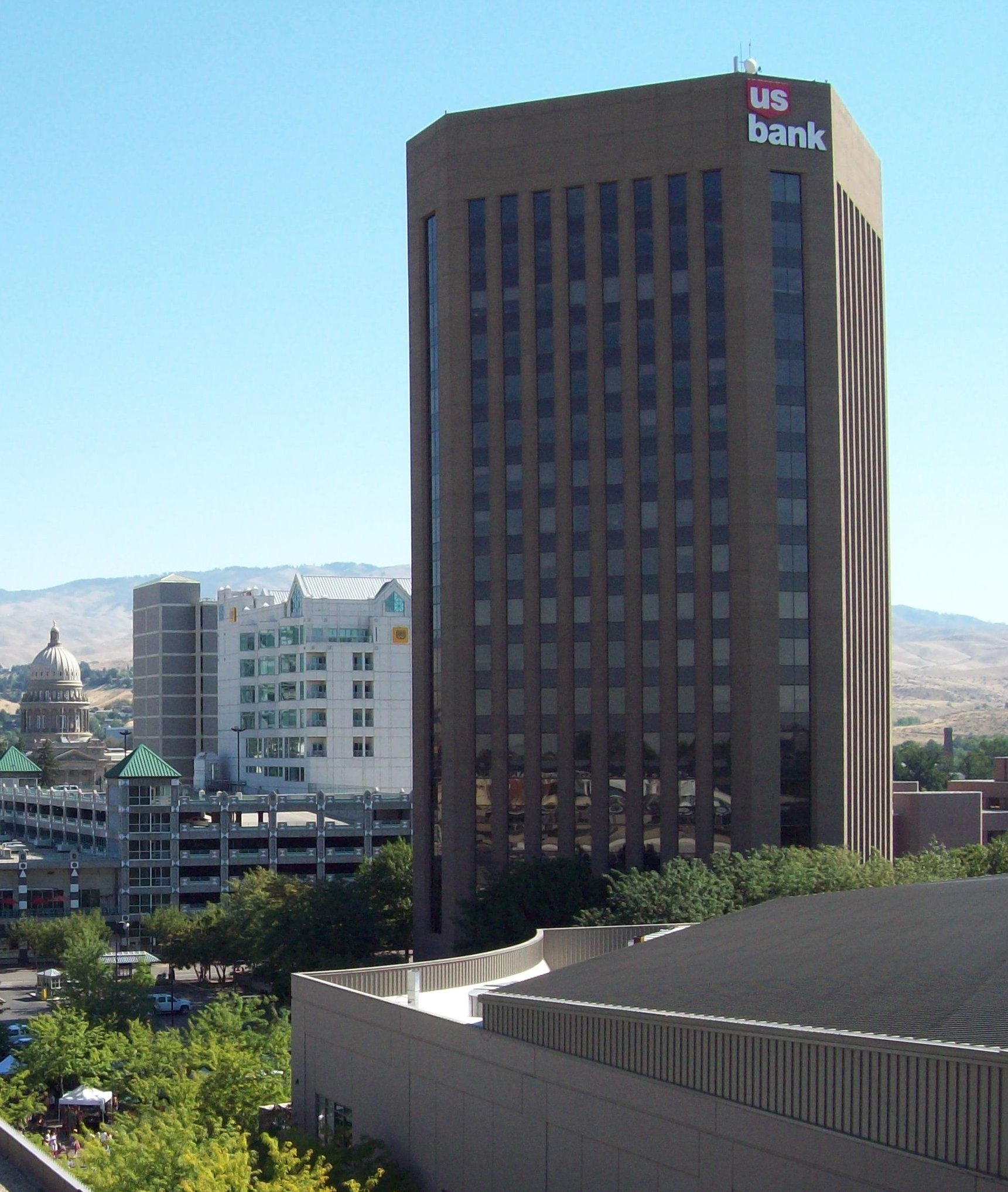
US Bank Plaza, constructed as "Idaho First Plaza," opened in 1978.

- 1978 – U.S. Bank Plaza opens, as "Idaho First Plaza"
  - Micron Technology begins operations
  - Boise Buckskins minor league baseball team begins play (sole season)
- 1979 – Mountain West Airlines-Idaho headquartered in Boise
- 1980 – Population: 102,249
- 1982 – Taco Bell Arena opens as "BSU Pavilion"
- 1984 – World Center for Birds of Prey established
  - Boise, Idaho Temple of The Church of Jesus Christ of Latter-day Saints opens
  - Funeral of U.S. Senator Frank Church
- 1986 – Bronco Stadium installs first blue AstroTurf field
- 1987 – Boise Hawks minor league baseball team's first season, relocated from Tri-Cities
  - Eastman Building fire,
- 1988 – Boise Towne Square Mall opens
  - Discovery Center of Idaho constructed.
- 1989 – Memorial Stadium opens for baseball
- 1990 – Boise Open golf tournament begins
  - Boise Centre (convention center) opens
  - Population: 125,738
- 1992 – Boise Weekly begins publication
  - Foothills School of Arts and Sciences established
- 1995 – Idaho Black History Museum built
- 1997
  - City website online (approximate date).
  - Boise Contemporary Theater group founded
  - CenturyLink Arena opens
  - Famous Idaho Potato Bowl (college football) game begins as "Humanitarian Bowl"
  - Removal of passenger services at Boise Union Pacific Depot
- 1998 – Fourth public high school, Timberline, opens
- 1999 – Boise Hare Krishna Temple built

== 21st century ==
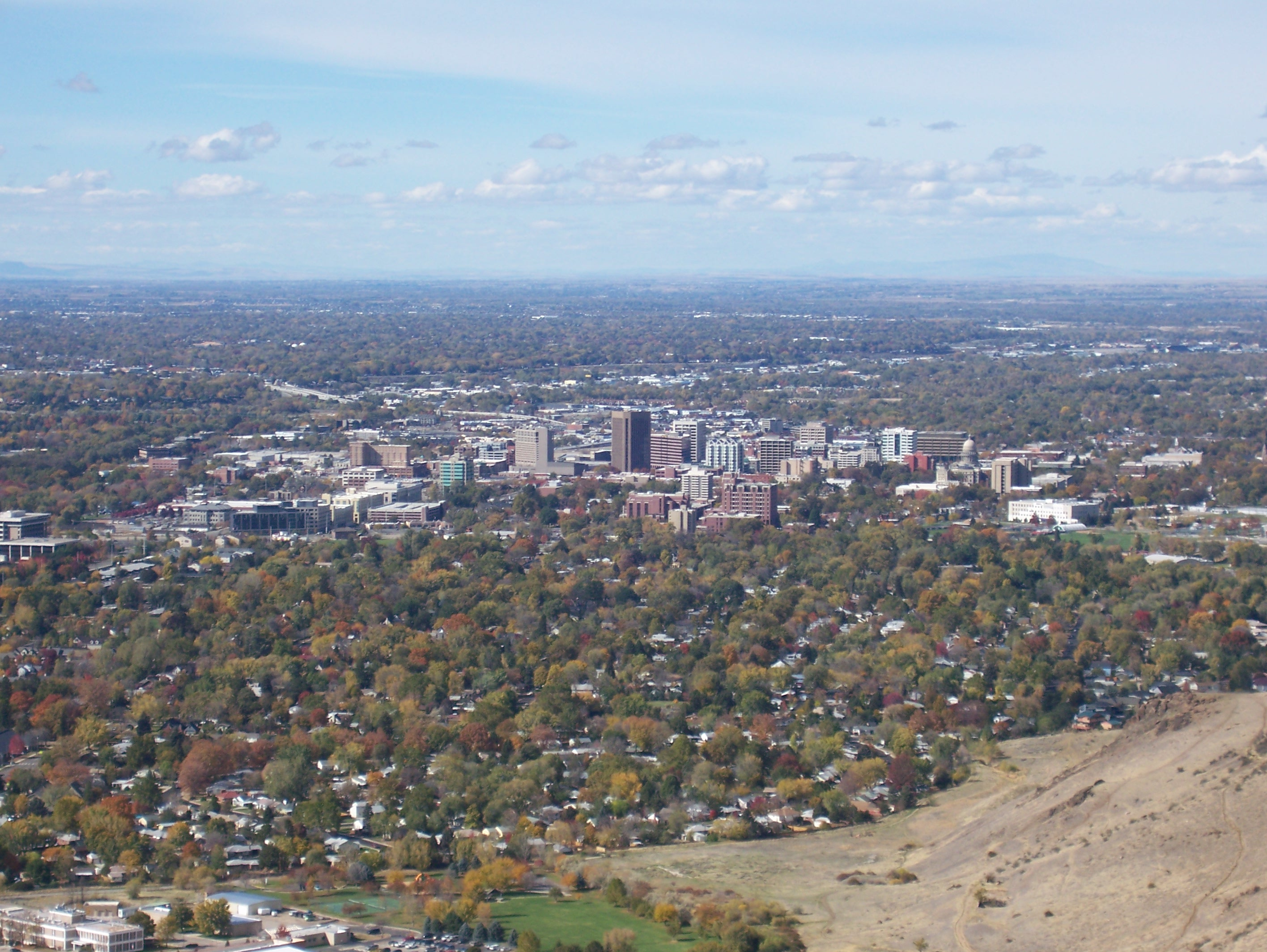
Aerial view of Boise in 2007

- 2000 – Riverstone Community School relocates to Boise.
  - Population: 181,711
- 2002 – Islamic Center founded.
- 2003 – Boise Dharma Center founded.
- 2004 – David H. Bieter becomes mayor.
- 2005 – Caldwell-Boise Express bus begins operating.
  - Boise Guardian begins publication.
- 2006 – Treasure Valley Rollergirls founded.
  - Albertsons LLC headquartered in Boise.

Butch Otter and Lori Otter, Governor and First Lady of Idaho, open the 2009 Special Olympics World Winter Games

- 2007 – College of Western Idaho founded.
- 2008 – Trey McIntyre dance troupe relocates to Boise.
  - Frank Church High School opens.
- 2009 – February: 2009 Special Olympics World Winter Games held.
- 2009 – June: Named a "Tree City USA" by Arbor Day Foundation.
- 2010 – Population: 205,671.
- 2011 – Idaho Aquarium opens.
- 2012 – Treefort Music Fest begins.
- 2013 – City sesquicentennial.
- 2017 – June 8, Declaration of the annual "Return of the Boise Valley People Day" to commemorate the connection of the exiled Boise Valley Shoshone and Bannock Tribes to their ancestral land
- 2020 – Population: 235,684.

== See also ==
- Boise history
- Boise metropolitan area
- Media in Boise, Idaho
- List of mayors of Boise

== Bibliography ==
- "Boise", An Illustrated history of the state of Idaho, Chicago: Lewis Pub. Co., 1899
- Sunset Magazine Homeseekers' Bureau (1908), Boise, Idaho, Boise: Boise Commercial Club, OL 7220896M
- "Boisé" . Encyclopædia Britannica. Vol. 4 (11th ed.). 1910. p. 153.
- Boise, Idaho, Boise: Boise Commercial Club, 1913, OL 25397669M
- Hiram T. French (1914), "(Boise)", History of Idaho, Chicago: Lewis Publishing Co., OCLC 2739177
- "Boise". Automobile Blue Book. New York: Automobile Blue Book Publishing Co. 1919.
- Federal Writers’ Project (1937). "Boise". Idaho: A Guide in Word and Pictures. American Guide Series. Caldwell, ID: Caxton Printers. p. 253+.
- Ory Mazar Nergal, ed. (1980), "Boise", Encyclopedia of American Cities, New York: E.P. Dutton, OL 4120668M
- "Rocky Mountains: Idaho: Boise", USA, Let's Go, New York: St. Martin's Press, 1999, OL 24937240M
