= Downtown Boise =

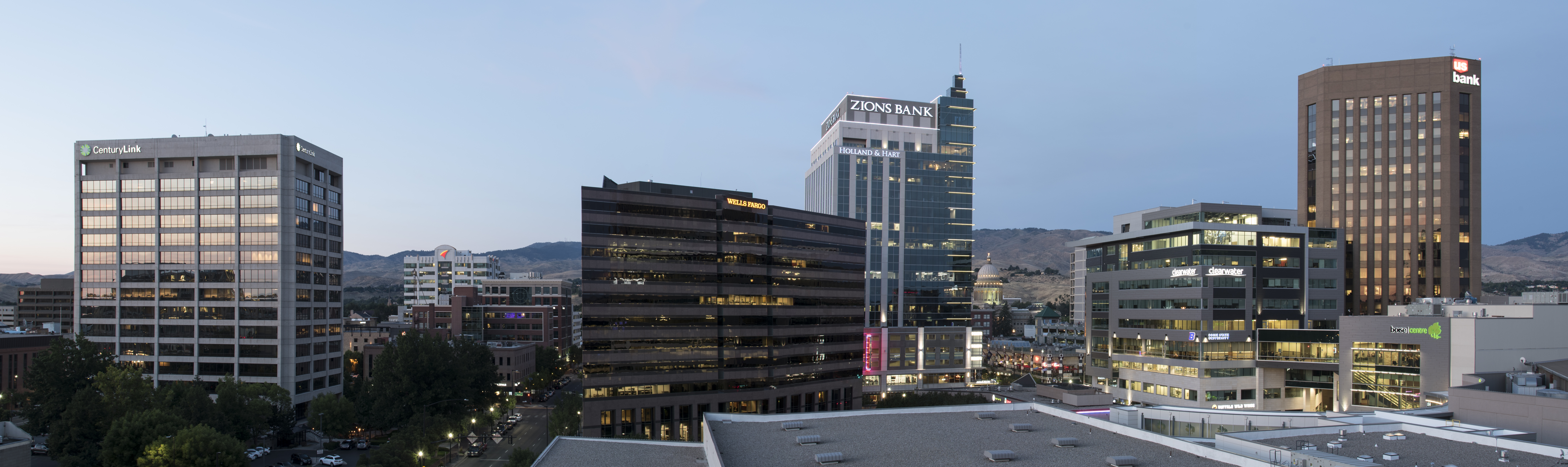
- Downtown Boise from the Aspen Lofts

- Location in the United States Location in Idaho
- Coordinates: 43.615°N 116.204°W
- Country: United States
- State: Idaho
- County: Ada County
- City: Boise
- Established: 1863
- Subdistricts of downtown: List: BoDo; Boise Central Downtown; Boise Cultural District; Capitol District; Linen District; Old Boise; Pioneer District

Area
  - Total: 1.02 sq mi (2.63 km^{2})
- Highest elevation: 2,720 ft (830 m)
- Lowest elevation: 2,671 ft (814 m)
- ZIP codes: 83702
- Area code: 208
- Website: downtownboise.org

Downtown Boise is the central business district of Boise, Idaho, located north of the Boise River. It is the largest city center in the U.S. state of Idaho.

== Parks ==
- Named for the four-term governor, Cecil Andrus Park is a two-acre (0.8 ha) park in the Capitol District, just south of the Idaho State Capitol. The park is home to brick walkways, lawns, shrubs, and trees, planting beds, benches, and picnic tables. The Golden Garden Club began a beautification project in the park in 2007. In 2008, new streetlights were installed in the park. A central plaza in the park honor servicemen and servicewomen with plaques. The park is home to three statues: Lincoln created by (Alphonso Pelzer, 1915), Steunenberg depicting Governor Steunenberg (Gilber Riswold, 1927) and Hospitality at the Nez Perce, which depicts Meriwether Lewis, William Clark, Chief Twisted Hair, and his son, Lawyer (Dough Hyde, 2006).
- C.W. Moore Park is a small urban park in old Boise. The land was given to the city in the 1930s by Charles Wilkinson Moore, who once served as president of the First National Bank of Idaho. The land had been used off and on as a park, but it wasn't until 1983 that the park was re-established. The park has segments of old buildings and signs along the walls. The park is also home to a water wheel and an open cut section of the Grove Street Ditch, which was constructed in 1866.
- The Grove is a plaza located in the center of downtown, reached via tree-lined pedestrian ways that are segments of Eighth and Grove Streets. In the middle of the plaza is a fountain. There are a number of public art displays in the Grove. The plaza is also home to regular outdoor events throughout the year, including the local farmer's market.
- The Idaho Anne Frank Human Rights Memorial is an educational park dedicated to Anne Frank along the Boise River. The memorial features guided pathways, waterfalls and a 180-foot-long (55 m) sandstone wall with quotes from various writers.
- Julia Davis Park, at over 90 acres (36 ha) is by far, the largest park in downtown Boise. It is home to a number of cultural and educational sites, including Zoo Boise, the Boise Art Museum, the Julia Davis Rose Garden, the Gene Harris Bandshell, the Idaho State Historical Museum, Discovery Center of Idaho, and the Idaho Black History Museum. The park also has a statue of Abraham Lincoln sitting on a stone bench. Paddleboats, including some shaped like pelicans and swans, can be rented to explore the lagoon and canal in the park. The park is also home to Coston Cabin and Pearce Cabin. Coston Cabin was originally located seven miles (11 km) east of its current site, built in 1863 by Isaac Coston from driftwood from the river. Pearce Cabin was also built in 1863 by Ira B. Pearce from logs from the mountains.
- Kristin's Park is the smallest park downtown, at just over 1,700 square feet (160 m^{2}). A short paved trail passes through the mini-park called the Pioneer Path. The trail ends on the sidewalk near the intersection of Myrtle and 11th Streets to the north. To the south, the path connects with the Boise River Greenbelt.
- Pioneer Tot Lot is a small playground in the Pioneer District for children from two to twelve years of age.
- Rhodes Park is a small park located at the southern edge of the Linen District and is named for a former Ada County commissioner. In 1992, Glenn Rhodes raised contributions and helped coordinate and build the park; it includes a skate park, basketball courts, and picnic tables. The site is located under Interstate 184, commonly referred to as the "Connector".
- Shoreline Park is a small park located on the Boise River along the Greenbelt. picnic tables, a grass overpass over the beltway, picnic table, and a river overlook. The park also serves as the location for the police volunteer ranger program.

== Tallest buildings ==
See List of tallest buildings in Boise

Rank	Name	Image	Height ft (m)	Floors	Year	Coordinates	Notes
1	Eighth & Main	Zions Bank Building Downtown Boise	323 (98)	18	2014	43°36′58.3″N 116°12′13.2″W	Tallest building in Idaho since 2013
2	The Arthur		290 (88)	26	2025	43°37′6.0″N 116°12′26.1″W	The roof is designed to resemble the Sawtooth Mountains
3	U.S. Bank Plaza	US Bank Plaza from the Aspen Lofts	267 (81)	19	1978	43°36′53.8″N 116°12′11.4″W	Tallest building in Idaho from 1978 to 2013
4	One Capital Center		206 (63)	14	1975	43°36′58.7″N 116°12′20.9″W	Tallest building in Idaho from 1975 to 1978
5	Idaho State Capitol		206 (63)	4	1920	43°37′3.9″N 116°11′59″W	Tallest building in Idaho from 1920 to 1975
6	Grove Hotel		196 (60)	16	2000	43°36′50.8″N 116°12′14.4″W	
7	The Aspen Lofts		194 (59)	17	2009	43°36′50.8″N 116°12′21.3″W	
8	Wells Fargo Center		182 (55)	11	1988	43°36′57.2″N 116°12′16.6″W	
9	Banner Bank Building		181 (55)	11	2006	43°37′6.1″N 116°12′14″W	
10	Key Center		174 (53)	13	1963	43°36′58″N 116°12′5.8″W	originally Bank of Idaho Building
11	Hoff Building		165 (50)	14	1930	43°37′4″N 116°12′7.5″W	originally Hotel Boise

== Transportation ==
Interstate 184 connects Interstate 84 with downtown. The interstate also carries US 20 and US 26 into downtown, which joins the freeway in Garden City. The freeway ends downtown at 13th Street, where it continues along two five-lane one-way streets. Myrtle Street carries eastbound traffic, while the three center lanes of the westbound Front Street become I-184 westbound. Broadway carries US 20/US 26 south to I-84, where it runs concurrently with the freeway heading east. Downtown is three miles north of the Boise Airport.

=== Bus service ===
Greyhound has a bus terminal in downtown Boise at Bannock and Thirteenth Streets. Greyhound operates buses to Salt Lake City and points beyond and to Pendleton, where one can continue on to Portland, Seattle or Spokane. ValleyRide offers numerous bus routes downtown that service the rest of the Boise metropolitan area.

=== River crossings ===
- Americana Bridge carries Americana Boulevard and two sidewalks over the river
- Pioneer Footbridge is a pedestrian bridge, which connects Anne Morrison Park and the Boise River Greenbelt
- Ninth Street Bridge, built in 1987, carries the southbound lanes of Ninth Street and two sidewalks over the river
- Eighth Street Bridge is a pedestrian bridge linking downtown with the Lusk Street District/JoPo neighborhood
- Oregon Trail Memorial Bridge, concrete arch bridge built in 1931 carries northbound lanes of Capitol Boulevard and two sidewalks over the river
- Friendship Bridge is a pedestrian bridge, which connects the Boise State University campus with Julia Davis Park
- Broadway Bridge, built in 1956, is being replaced with a new, larger bridge. It carried Broadway Avenue and two sidewalks over the river
