= List of tallest buildings by U.S. state and territory =

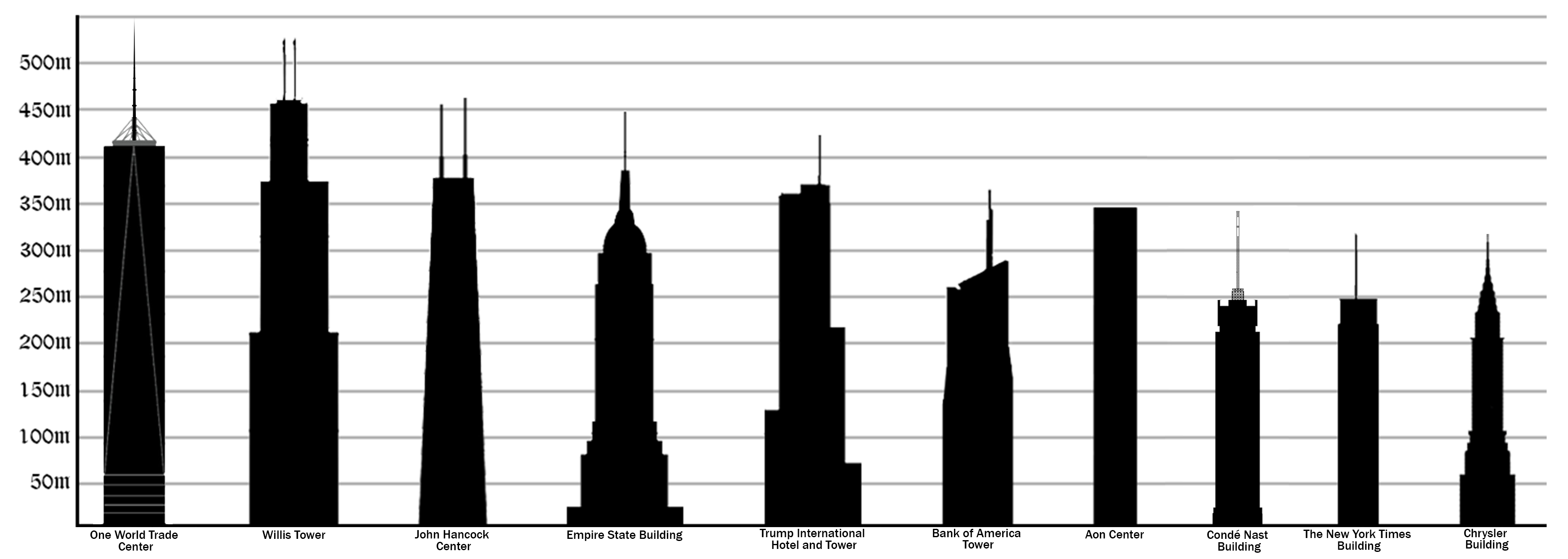
A diagram illustrating the tallest skyscrapers in the United States ranked by pinnacle height as of 2014, including One World Trade Center, the Willis Tower, and the John Hancock Center.

A choropleth map of the United States showing the architectural height of the tallest building in each state. >1,000 ft 750–999 ft 500–749 ft 250–499 ft <250 ft

This article provides a list of the tallest buildings by U.S. state and territory, ranking buildings based on standard architectural height measurements. This evaluation criteria includes permanent spires and architectural details but excludes antenna masts and alternative broadcasting equipment. The "Year" column indicates the year in which each building reached full completion. Demographically, 40 of these record holding structures are situated within their respective state's largest city by population, while 18 are located within state capital cities.

The tallest building in the United States by architectural height is One World Trade Center in New York City, which reaches 541.3 m (1,776 ft). This individual height exceeds the cumulative heights of the tallest buildings in Wyoming, Vermont, Maine, South Dakota, Montana, North Dakota, New Hampshire, and West Virginia combined. Corporate banking entities represent a significant percentage of development sponsors: three structures are attributed to JPMorgan Chase and U.S. Bancorp, while two are associated with Wells Fargo and the Bank of America. As of 2026, 32 states contain skyscrapers exceeding 150 m (492 ft), while 6 states contain supertall skyscrapers as defined by a minimum architectural height of 300 m (984 ft).

== Current tallest building in each state, territory, or district ==
| State/Territory | City | Building | Image | Height m (ft) | Floors | Year | Primary Purpose | Previous Names | Notes |
|---|---|---|---|---|---|---|---|---|---|
| Alabama | Mobile | RSA Battle House Tower | | 227.1 m (745 ft) | 35 | 2006 | Office | | |
| Alaska | Anchorage | Conoco-Phillips Building | | 90.2 m (296 ft) | 22 | 1982 | Office | | |
| American Samoa | Tafuna | Aleki Sene, Sr. Telecommunications Center | | 12.2 m (40 ft) | 4 | 2010 | Telecommunications | | |
| Arizona | Phoenix | Chase Tower | | 147.2 m (483 ft) | 40 | 1972 | Office | Bank One Center, Valley Bank Center | |
| Arkansas | Little Rock | Simmons Tower | | 166.4 m (546 ft) | 40 | 1985 | Office | Capitol Tower, TCBY Tower, Metropolitan Tower | |
| California | Los Angeles | Wilshire Grand Center | | 335.3 m (1,100 ft) | 73 | 2016 | Hotel / Office | | Tallest building in the Western United States. |
| Colorado | Denver | Republic Plaza | | 217.6 m (714 ft) | 56 | 1984 | Office | | |
| Connecticut | Hartford | City Place I | | 163.1 m (535 ft) | 38 | 1979 | Office | | |
| Delaware | Wilmington | 1201 North Market Street | | 109.8 m (360 ft) | 23 | 1988 | Office | | |
| District of Columbia | Washington, D.C. | Basilica of the National Shrine of the Immaculate Conception | | 100.3 m (329 ft) | 2 | 1959 | Church | | |
| Florida | Miami | Cipriani Residences Miami | | 289.5 m (950 ft) | 80 | 2027 | Residential | | |
| (Georgia (U.S. state)) Georgia | Atlanta | Bank of America Plaza | | 311.8 m (1,023 ft) | 55 | 1991 | Office | Nations Bank Building | Tallest building in the Southeastern United States. |
| Guam | Tamuning | Oceana Tower II | | 114.8 m (377 ft) | 32 | 1991 | Hotel | | |
| Hawaii | Honolulu | Century Center | | 151.5 m (497 ft) | 41 | 1978 | Office / Residential | | Tallest building in the non-contiguous United States. |
| Idaho | Boise | Eighth & Main | | 98.5 m (323 ft) | 18 | 2013 | Office | | |
| Illinois | Chicago | Willis Tower | | 442.1 m (1,450 ft) | 108 | 1972 | Office | Sears Tower | Tallest building in the Midwestern United States. Tallest building in the world from 1972 to 2003. |
| Indiana | Indianapolis | Salesforce Tower | | 247.2 m (811 ft) | 49 | 1989 | Office | Bank One Tower, Chase Tower, American Fletcher Bank Tower | |
| Iowa | Des Moines | 801 Grand | | 192 m (630 ft) | 44 | 1991 | Office | | |
| Kansas | Wichita | Epic Center | | 97.5 m (320 ft) | 22 | 1989 | Office | | |
| Kentucky | Louisville | 400 West Market | | 167.3 m (549 ft) | 35 | 1991 | Office | Capital Holding Center, Providian Center, AEGON Center | |
| Louisiana | New Orleans | Hancock Whitney Center | | 212.5 m (697 ft) | 51 | 1971 | Office | One Shell Square | |
| Maine | Biddeford | Saint Joseph's Church | | 71.6 m (235 ft) | 3 | 1882 | Church | | |
| Maryland | Baltimore | 100 Light Street | | 161.2 m (529 ft) | 40 | 1972 | Office | USF&G Building, Legg Mason Building, Transamerica Tower | |
| Massachusetts | Boston | 200 Clarendon | | 240.8 m (790 ft) | 60 | 1971 | Office | John Hancock Tower | Tallest building in New England. |
| Michigan | Detroit | Detroit Marriott at the Renaissance Center | | 221.5 m (727 ft) | 73 | 1976 | Hotel | Detroit Plaza Hotel, The Westin Renaissance Center | Tallest hotel outside of Canada from 1976 till today. |
| Minnesota | Minneapolis | IDS Center | | 241.4 m (792 ft) | 55 | 1971 | Office | | |
| Mississippi | Biloxi | Beau Rivage Casino Hotel | | 105.5 m (346 ft) | 32 | 1998 | Hotel / Casino | | |
| Missouri | Kansas City | One Kansas City Place | | 189.9 m (623 ft) | 42 | 1988 | Office | | |
| Montana | Billings | First Interstate Center | | 82.9 m (272 ft) | 20 | 1985 | Office | | |
| Nebraska | Omaha | Mutual of Omaha Headquarters Tower | | 206.4 m (677 ft) | 44 | 2026 | Office | | |
| Nevada | Las Vegas | Fontainebleau Las Vegas | | 224 m (735 ft) | 67 | 2022 | Hotel / Casino | | |
| New Hampshire | Manchester | City Hall Plaza | | 83.8 m (275 ft) | 20 | 1991 | Office | | |
| New Jersey | Jersey City | 99 Hudson Street | | 271 m (889 ft) | 79 | 2019 | Residential | | |
| New Mexico | Albuquerque | Albuquerque Plaza | | 107 m (351 ft) | 22 | 1989 | Office | | |
| New York | New York City | One World Trade Center | | 541.3 m (1,776 ft) | 104 | 2013 | Office | Freedom Tower | Tallest building in North America and Western Hemisphere. Tallest building in the OECD from 2014 to 2017. |
| North Carolina | Charlotte | Bank of America Corporate Center | | 265.5 m (871 ft) | 60 | 1991 | Office | NationsBank Corporate Center | |
| North Dakota | Bismarck | North Dakota State Capitol | | 73.8 m (242 ft) | 19 | 1932 | Government | | |
| Northern Mariana Islands | Saipan | Imperial Pacific | | 71.5 m (235 ft) | 14 | 2016 | Hotel / Casino | | |
| Ohio | Cleveland | Key Tower | | 288.7 m (947 ft) | 57 | 1991 | Office | Society Center | |
| Oklahoma | Oklahoma City | Devon Energy Center | | 257.2 m (844 ft) | 50 | 2011 | Office | | |
| Oregon | Portland | Wells Fargo Center | | 166.4 m (546 ft) | 40 | 1972 | Office | NationsBank Corporate Center, First Interstate Tower | |
| Pennsylvania | Philadelphia | Comcast Technology Center | | 341.7 m (1,121 ft) | 60 | 2017 | Hotel / Office | | |
| Puerto Rico | Fajardo | Dos Marinas II | | 110.1 m (361 ft) | 30 | 1972 | Residential | | |
| Rhode Island | Providence | Industrial National Bank Building | | 130.5 m (428 ft) | 26 | 1926 | Office | Industrial Trust Building, Fleet Bank Tower, Bank of America Building, 111 Westminster Street | |
| South Carolina | Goose Creek | Nexans Tower | | 130 m (427 ft) | 14 | 2014 | Industrial | | |
| South Dakota | Sioux Falls | CenturyLink Tower | | 53 m (174 ft) | 11 | 1971 | Office | Qwest Tower | |
| Tennessee | Nashville | 333 Commerce | | 188.1 m (617 ft) | 33 | 1993 | Office | BellSouth Building, AT&T Building | |
| Texas | Austin | Waterline | | 312.4 m (1,025 ft) | 74 | 2026 | Residential / Hotel / Office | | Tallest building in the Southern United States. Texas's first supertall. |
| United States Virgin Islands | Bellevue | Ocean Tower | | 28.7 m (94 ft) | 8 | 1972 | Hotel | | |
| Utah | Salt Lake City | Astra Tower | | 136.8 m (449 ft) | 40 | 2024 | Residential | | |
| Vermont | Rutland | Grace Church | | 60.7 m (199 ft) | 1 | 1858 | Church | | |
| Virginia | Virginia Beach | Westin Virginia Beach Town Center | | 154.8 m (508 ft) | 38 | 2006 | Residential / Hotel | | |
| Washington | Seattle | Columbia Center | | 284.4 m (933 ft) | 76 | 1985 | Office | Columbia Seafirst Center, Bank of America Tower | |
| West Virginia | Charleston | West Virginia State Capitol | | 89 m (292 ft) | 4 | 1932 | Government | | |
| Wisconsin | Milwaukee | U.S. Bank Center | | 183.2 m (601 ft) | 42 | 1972 | Office | Firstar Center, First Wisconsin Center | |
| Wyoming | Cheyenne | Wyoming Financial Center | | 45 m (148 ft) | 11 | 1989 | Office | | |

== Tallest buildings under construction, approved, or proposed ==
This section lists upcoming engineering projects, compiling the tallest under construction, approved, and proposed buildings that are projected to claim the title of the tallest building within their respective state or territory upon completion.

| State/Territory | City | Building | Height m (ft) | Floors | Planned Completion | Status | Previous Tallest m (ft) | References |
|---|---|---|---|---|---|---|---|---|
| Arizona | Phoenix | Arro North Tower | 165 m (541 ft) | 44 | 2029 | Approved | 147.2 m (483 ft) | |
| California | San Francisco | 77 Beale Street | 373.4 m (1,225 ft) | 76 | 2032 | Proposed | 335.3 m (1,100 ft) | |
| Delaware | Wilmington | 1001-1011 Jefferson Street | 155 m (509 ft) | 35 | TBA | Proposed | 109.8 m (360 ft) | |
| Idaho | Boise | 11th and Front | 137.5 m (451 ft) | 39 | 2029 | Approved | 98.5 m (323 ft) | |
| Florida | Miami | Waldorf Astoria Hotel and Residences Miami | 319.7 m (1,049 ft) | 100 | 2028 | Under Construction | 264.6 m (868 ft) | |
| Guam | Tumon | Honhui Tumon Bay Hotel | 150 m (492 ft) | 37 | TBA | Approved | 114.8 m (377 ft) | |
| Maine | Portland | Old Port Square Tower | 115.8 m (380 ft) | 30 | TBA | Approved | 71.6 m (235 ft) | |
| Michigan | Detroit | Blue Fountain Tower | 365.8 m (1,200 ft) | 90 | TBA | Proposed | 221.5 m (727 ft) | |
| Nevada | Las Vegas | LVXP Las Vegas | 229.2 m (752 ft) | 59 | 2029 | Approved | 224 m (735 ft) | |
| New Jersey | Jersey City | 100 Bay Street | 321.6 m (1,055 ft) | 90 | 2031 | Proposed | 274 m (899 ft) | |
| Oklahoma | Oklahoma City | Legends Tower | 581.3 m (1,907 ft) | 134 | 2030 | Approved | 257.2 m (844 ft) | |
| Pennsylvania | Philadelphia | Transit Terminal Tower | 365.8 m (1,200 ft) | 85 | 2043 | Proposed | 341.7 m (1,121 ft) | |
| Puerto Rico | San Juan | Mangrove Tower | 206.5 m (677 ft) | 55 | TBA | Proposed | 110.1 m (361 ft) | |
| Tennessee | Nashville | Paramount Tower | 228.6 m (750 ft) | 60 | 2027 | Under Construction | 188.1 m (617 ft) | |
| Virginia | Chesapeake | LS Greenlink VCV Tower | 201.2 m (660 ft) | 26 | 2027 | Under Construction | 154.8 m (508 ft) | |
| Washington | Seattle | 4/C | 313.6 m (1,029 ft) | 93 | TBA | Proposed | 284.4 m (933 ft) | |

== Method of determination ==
The structural heights compared within this index are calculated from ground level to the architectural top, encompassing all habitable structures regardless of the total number of occupied floors. Non-freestanding structures, observation towers, and telecommunication masts are excluded, as exemplified by the guyed mast structure in North Dakota, which represents the largest of its type globally. Broadcast antennas extending from the roofline are similarly omitted from these measurements. Conversely, integral spires are included within the total calculation, a criterion that permits One World Trade Center to be ranked taller than the Willis Tower, despite the highest occupied floor of the Willis Tower exceeding that of One World Trade Center. The Council on Tall Buildings and Urban Habitat serves as the primary arbiter for structural height classifications and ranking disputes.

== See also ==
- List of tallest buildings in the United States
- List of tallest buildings in the world
- List of tallest structures in the United States
- List of tallest buildings by country
- List of tallest buildings by German federal state
