= Boise Capitol Area District =

Historic district in Idaho, United States

- U.S. National Register of Historic Places
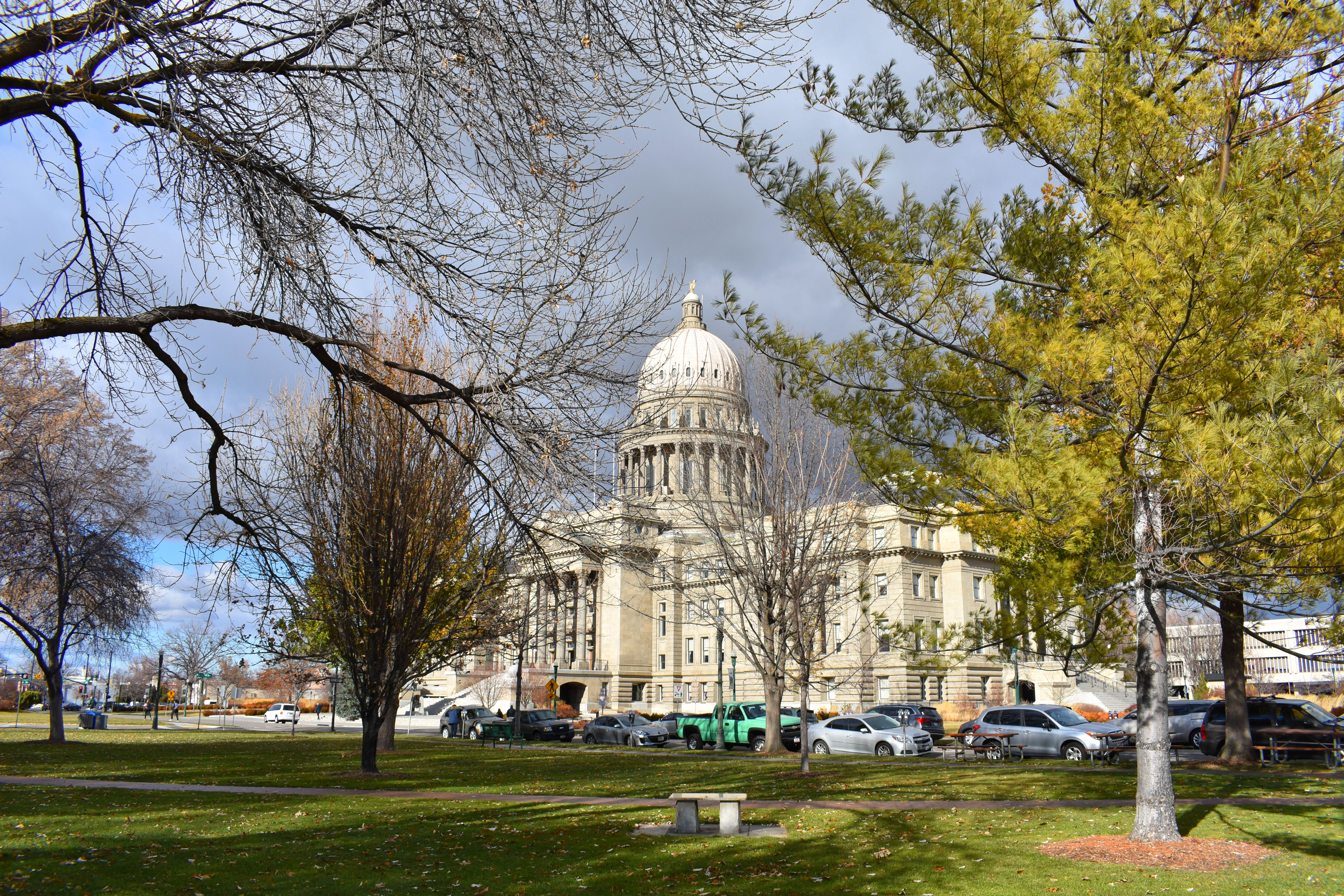

- Location within Idaho Location within the United States
- Location: Roughly bounded by 6th and Bannock, N. 8th, 8th, State, 5th Ana Jefferson Sts., Boise, Idaho
- Area: 18 acres (7.3 ha)
- Built: 1899
- Architect: Tourtellotte & Hummel; Et al.
- Architectural style: Moderne, Beaux Arts, English Gothic
- NRHP reference No.: 76000663
- Added to NRHP: May 12, 1976

The Boise Capitol Area District in Boise, Idaho, is an area of Downtown Boise that includes current and former government buildings, a former hotel, one cathedral, and one monument. The district was added to the National Register of Historic Places in 1976.

== Buildings ==
- Idaho State Capitol (1912, 1919, 1920)
- Old Ada County Courthouse (1939)
- Old Federal Building (1904)
- Hotel Boise (Hoff Building) (1930)
- Steunenberg Monument (1929)
- St. Michael's Cathedral (1902)
- Christian Science Building (1910), demolished
- Milton Building (1904), demolished
