= The Arthur =

High-rise residential building in Idaho

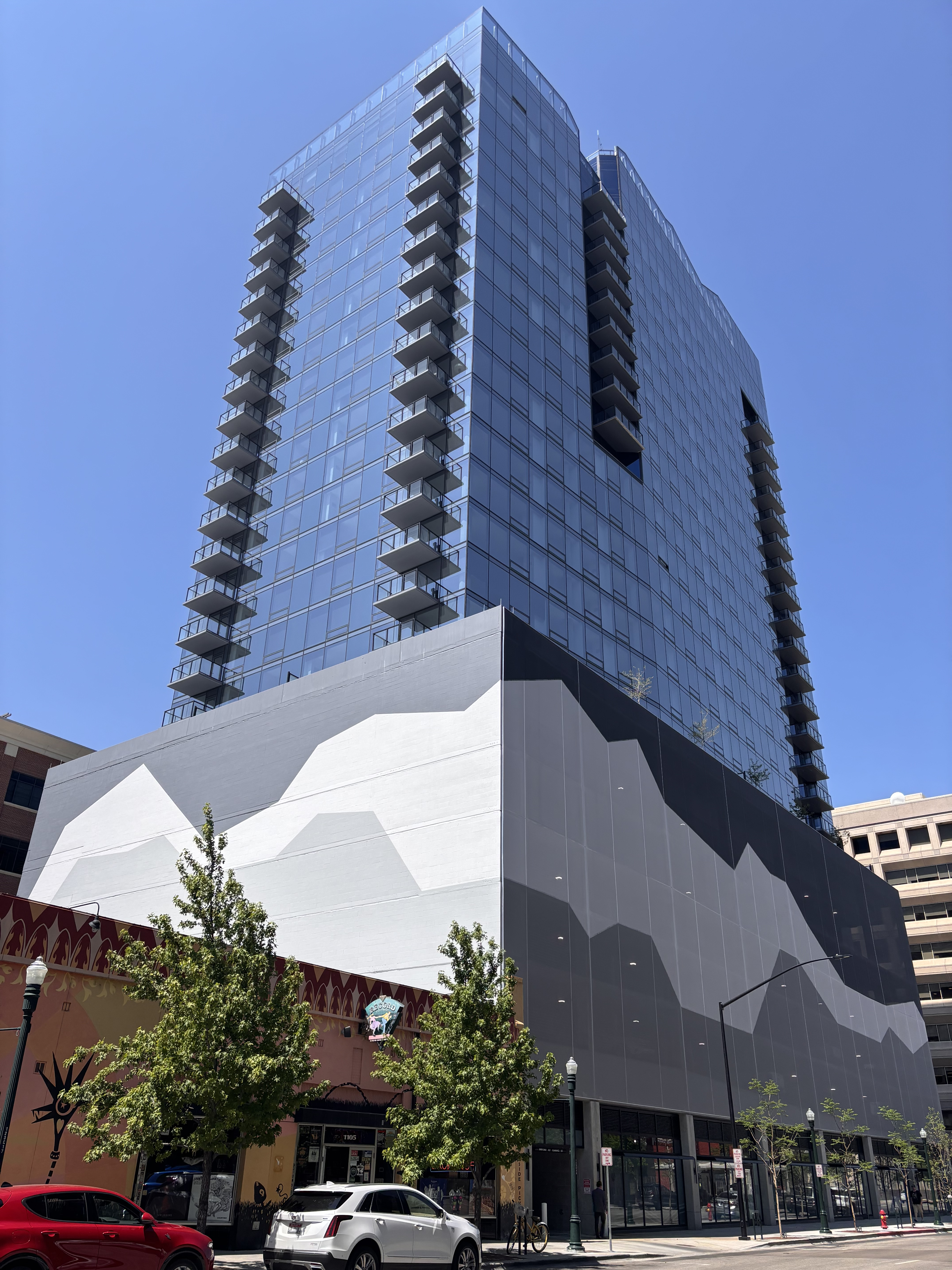
- The Arthur in June 2025
- Interactive map of the The Arthur area

General information
- Status: Completed
- Type: Luxury residential
- Location: 120 N. 12th Street, Boise, Idaho, United States
- Coordinates: 43°37′6.0″N 116°12′26.1″W
- Groundbreaking: November 2022
- Completed: 2025
- Opened: May 22, 2025
- Owner: Oppenheimer Development Corp., Ponsky Capital Partners, White Oak Realty

Height
- Height: 290 ft (88 m)

Technical details
- Floor count: 26

Design and construction
- Architect: Solomon Cordwell Buenz
- Structural engineer: Baldridge & Associates Structural Engineering (BASE)

Website
- livearthurboise.com

The Arthur is a 26-story high-rise residential building in Boise, Idaho, United States. Opening on May 22nd, 2025, it has a height of 290 feet (88 m) over 26 floors. While still being shorter than the total height of the 323 foot (98 m) Eighth & Main tower, The Arthur would be 12 feet taller than the Eighth & Main without its spire.

The Arthur is owned by a joint venture partnership consisting of White Oak Realty Partners, Ponsky Capital Partners, and Oppenheimer Development Corporation.

== History ==
In 2021, the development company Oppenheimer Development Corporation announced plans to construct a 27-story building in Downtown Boise for luxury residential space. The building was expected to reach 330 feet (101 m) tall, becoming the tallest building in Idaho.

== Design ==
The tower's design has several references to the greater environment of Boise, with its roof being sculpted to resemble the Sawtooth Mountain Range with a jagged form, and a graphic of the aforementioned mountains enclosing the parking area. The exterior of the building also features floor to ceiling windows all around the skyscraper, allowing residents to see views of the wider Boise landscape.
