= 11th and Front =

Proposed tallest building in the state of Idaho

- Interactive map of the 11th and Front area

General information
- Status: Proposed
- Type: Mixed-use residential
- Location: 1080 W. Front St., Boise, Idaho, United States
- Coordinates: 43°36′58″N 116°12′25″W
- Groundbreaking: June 2026
- Completed: 2029 (expected)
- Owner: Front Street Holdings

Height
- Height: 451 ft (137.5 m)

Technical details
- Floor count: 39

Design and construction
- Architect: GGLO

11th and Front is a proposed 39-story skyscraper located in Boise, Idaho. Expected to rise to the height of 451 feet (137.5 m), it would become the tallest building in both the state of Idaho and city of Boise, eclipsing the previous tallest building, Eighth & Main, by 128 feet (39 m).

== History ==
The site of the proposed building is a half of a former parking lot, and was purchased by Front Street Holdings in 2022. The following year, renderings of the potential building by the architecture firm GGLO were leaked in a portfolio, showing a 40-story apartment complex.

In 2023, work began on the other half of the parking lot, which is being constructed into a 15-story hotel. Construction is expected to begin in June 2026, shortly after the hotel finishes. The building is then expected to be completed and opened in 2029.

== Design ==
All released designs and renderings of the skyscraper display a large use of glass and steel, which is in line with the materials that GGLO often uses in its other projects. The building also appears to step back as it rises higher, and is expected to have green terraces on top of the several rooves.

The project is also expected to have 420 units of apartments, as well as allotted space for parking and retail.

== See also ==
- List of tallest buildings in Boise
