= List of tallest buildings in Boise =

Skyline of Boise
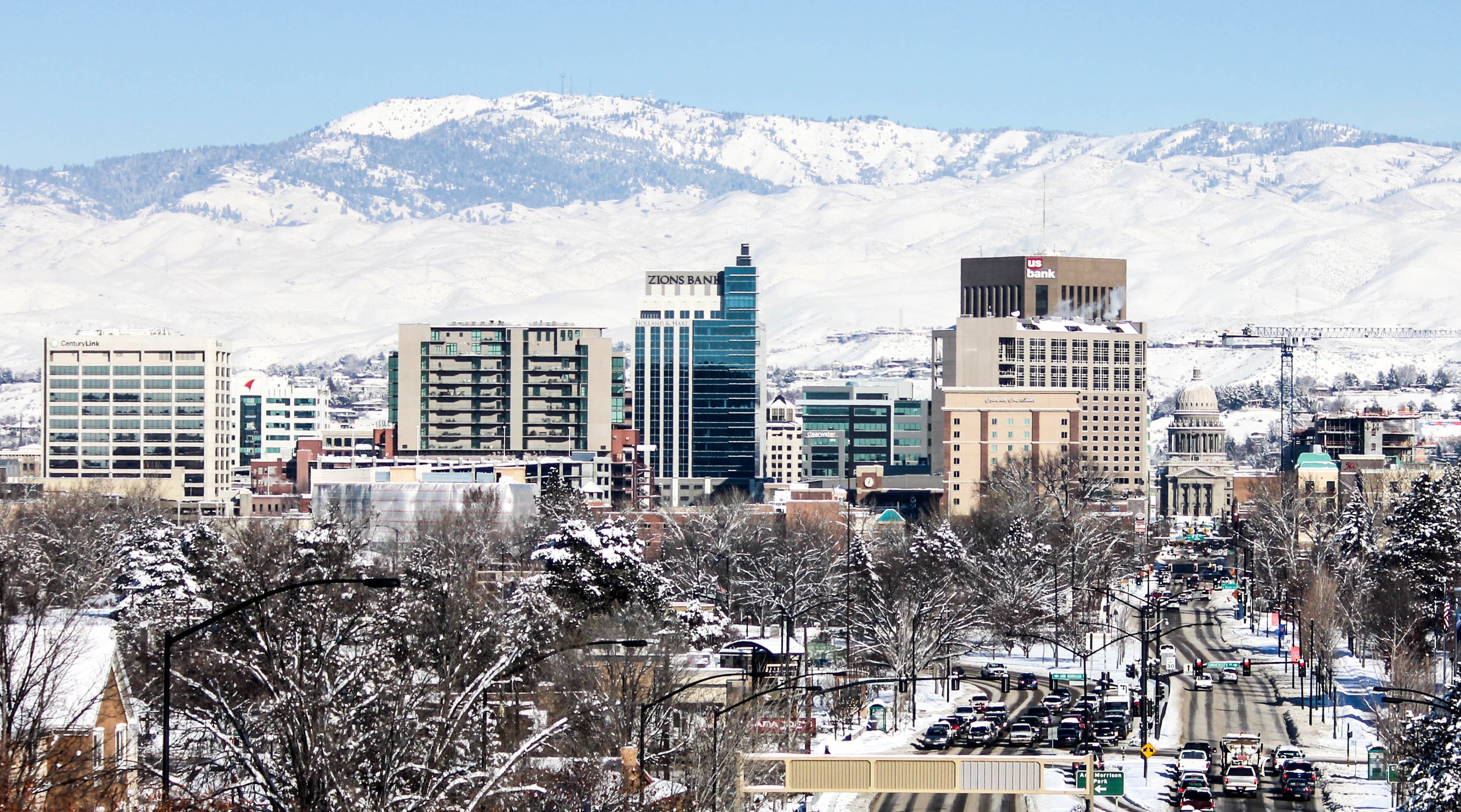
- Downtown Boise in the winter of 2017
- Tallest building: Eighth & Main (2014)
- Tallest building height: 323 ft (98.4 m)

Number of tall buildings
- Taller than 50 m (164 ft): 12
- Taller than 75 m (246 ft): 3

Number of tall buildings — feet
- Taller than 200 ft (61.0 m): 6
- Taller than 300 ft (91.4 m): 1

The following table shows the tallest buildings in Boise, Idaho. The tallest building in Boise and the state of Idaho since 2014 is the Eighth & Main Building at 18 floors and 323 feet (278 feet without the spire) in height.

== Cityscape ==
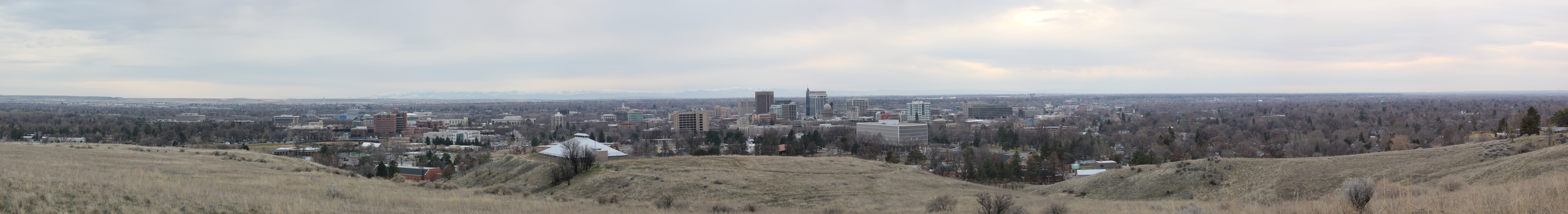
Looking east at Downtown Boise in 2019

== Tallest buildings ==
This list ranks completed buildings in Boise that stand at least 150 ft (45.7 m) tall as of 2026, based on standard height measurement. This includes spires and architectural details but does not include antenna masts. The “Year” column indicates the year of completion. Buildings tied in height are sorted by year of completion with earlier buildings ranked first, and then alphabetically.

Was the tallest building in Boise upon completion

Rank	Name	Image	Height ft (m)	Floors	Year	Purpose	Notes
1	Eighth & Main		323 (98.4)	18	2014	Office	Tallest building in Boise and in Idaho since 2014. Tallest building in Boise completed in the 2010s. Houses the Idaho headquarters of Zions Bank, as well as Holland & Hart and other companies.
2	The Arthur	The Arthur, 03-08-25	290 (88.4)	26	2025	Residential	Tallest building in Boise completed in the 2020s. Tallest residential building in Boise and tallest building by roof height. The top of The Arthur was designed to resemble the Sawtooth Range, hence the jagged roof.
3	US Bank Plaza		267 (81.4)	19	1978	Office	Tallest building in Boise and in Idaho from 1978 to 2014. Originally known as the Idaho First Plaza until 1989.
4	Idaho State Capitol		208 (63.4)	4	1920	Government	Tallest building in Boise and in Idaho from 1920 to 1978.
5	One Capital Center		207 (63)	14	1975	Office	Tallest high-rise building in Boise from 1975 to 1978.
6	The Grove Hotel		200 (61)	16	2000	Hotel	Tallest hotel building in Boise.
7	Aspen Lofts		194 (59.1)	17	2009	Residential	Also known as The Aspen.
8	Banner Bank Building		181 (55.2)	11	2006	Office	
9	Wells Fargo Building		180 (55)	11	1988	Office	Known as the First Interstate Building until 1996.
10	AC/Element Hotels	—	180 (55)	15	2026	Hotel	The first dual hotel building in Boise
11	Key Tower		174 (53)	13	1963	Office	Tallest high-rise building in Boise from 1963 to 1975. Originally known as the Bank of Idaho until 1981. Known as First Interstate until 1988.
12	Hoff Building		164 (50)	13	1930	Office	Originally the Hotel Boise. This building was sold to the Hoff family in 1976. Tallest high-rise building in Boise from 1930 to 1963.
13	Chase Tower Plaza		161 (49)	11	1995	Office	Also known as the Washington Mutual Building until 2009.
14	Idaho Power Building		160 (48.8)	9	1990	Office	
15	Saint Alphonsus Center for Advanced Healing	—	153 (46.6)	9	2007	Health	The tallest building located outside of downtown Boise.

== Tallest under construction or proposed ==
=== Under construction ===
The following table includes buildings under construction in Boise that are planned to be at least 150 ft (45.7 m) tall as of 2026, based on standard height measurement. The “Year” column indicates the expected year of completion. Buildings that are on hold are not included.

Name	Height ft (m)	Floors	Year	Purpose	Notes
The Bannock	199 (60.7)	13	2026	Mixed-use	Mixed-use office and residential building. Also known as ICCU Plaza. Originally planned to be 232 feet (71 m) tall, though local backlash forced the developer to revise the building's height.
St. Luke's Tower	174 (53)	9	2030	Health	Topped off in 2026.

=== Proposed ===
The following table includes approved and proposed buildings in Boise that are expected to be at least 150 ft (45.7 m) tall as of 2026, based on standard height measurement. The “Year” column indicates the expected year of completion. A dash “–“ indicates information about the building’s height, floor count, or year of completion is unknown or has not been released.

Name	Height ft (m)	Floors	Purpose	Status	Year	Notes
11th and Front	451 (137.5)	39	Residential	Permitting	2029	420 units.
The Boardwalk	252 (76.8)	18	Residential	Approved	2027	18 story condominium tower in Garden City, a few miles northwest of Downtown Boise. This tower is part of a 3 phase project, the 18 story tower being the largest of the three. The site for the tower has been paved over, so it has most likely been cancelled. However, there are no official statements, so it won't be removed from the list yet.
27th and Fairview	200 (61)	16	Residential	Proposed	2035	A highly anticipated proposal sitting on the very edge of downtown at the river, this high-rise will extend the skyline almost a mile west, and would be one of the tallest buildings in the city. Height is an estimate.
8th and River	171 (52.1)	12	Residential	Proposed	—	169 units that would feature office tenants as well as restaurant/retail space.

== See also ==
- List of tallest buildings in Billings
- List of tallest buildings in Colorado Springs
- List of tallest buildings in Denver
- List of tallest buildings in Salt Lake City
