= Foothills School of Arts and Sciences =

Coordinates: 43°36′40″N 116°12′27″W

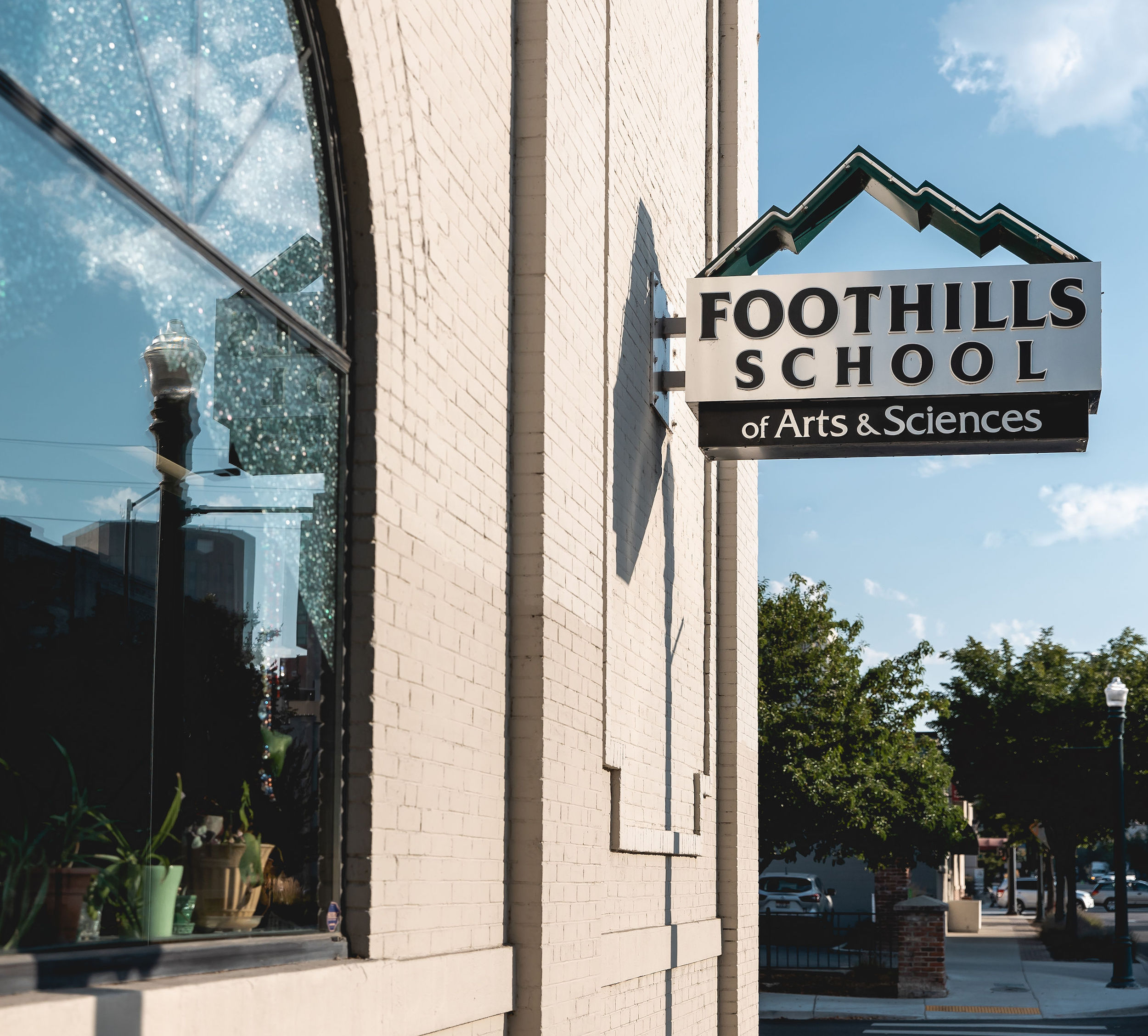
- Downtown campus, Foothills School of Arts and Sciences

Location
- 601 South 9th Street; Boise, Idaho 83702; United States

Information
- Established: 1992
- Founder: Susan and John Medlin
- Teaching staff: 22 (as of 2022-23)
- Grades: Preschool to 9th Grade
- Enrollment: 171 (as of 2022-23)
- Student to teacher ratio: 10:1 (as of 2022-2023)
- Campus type: Urban
- Mascot: Phoenix
- Website: http://www.foothillsschool.org/

Foothills School of Arts and Sciences is an independent private school in Boise, Idaho, educating EL (Early Learners Preschool) ages three and four, along with Kindergarten through ninth grade.

== History ==
Foothills School of Arts and Sciences was founded in 1992 by Susan and John Medlin. It was the first non-sectarian independent school in Boise. Initially housed at the Boise Unitarian Fellowship, the school expanded to use all its available space by its third year of operation with K–6 students. It relocated to an 8th St. location in 1995 and then to its current 9th St. location in 2019. In 1998, a preschool program was added, funded in part by a grant from the J. A. and Kathryn Albertson Foundation. The school added a ninth grade in the 2009–2010 school year.

The school is an accredited member of the Northwest Association of Independent Schools and Cognia.

== Campus ==
Foothills School's campus is located on 9th Street in Downtown Boise, in close proximity to the BoDo District that contains a pedestrian zone with numerous cafes and restaurants. Foothills is also within walking distance of the Idaho State Capitol Plaza, JUMP, City Center Grove Plaza, and many other historic landmarks. The Foothills campus is located near Julia Davis Park and the Boise greenbelt.

== Curriculum ==
Foothills School of Arts and Sciences employs progressive and project-based Learning methods including socratic seminars. Teachers encourage students to think for themselves and about the world around them and to ask questions, instead of simply finding answers. The Early Learners preschool program is inspired by the Reggio Emilia approach.

== Demographics ==
The diversity of 155 students: (Note: Source is outdated.)

Students demographics
White	Hispanic	African America	Asian	Native American	Other
89%	3.9%	2.6%	2.6%	0.6%	1.3%
