= U.S. Bank Building (Boise) =

High-rise building located in Boise, Idaho

US Bank Building
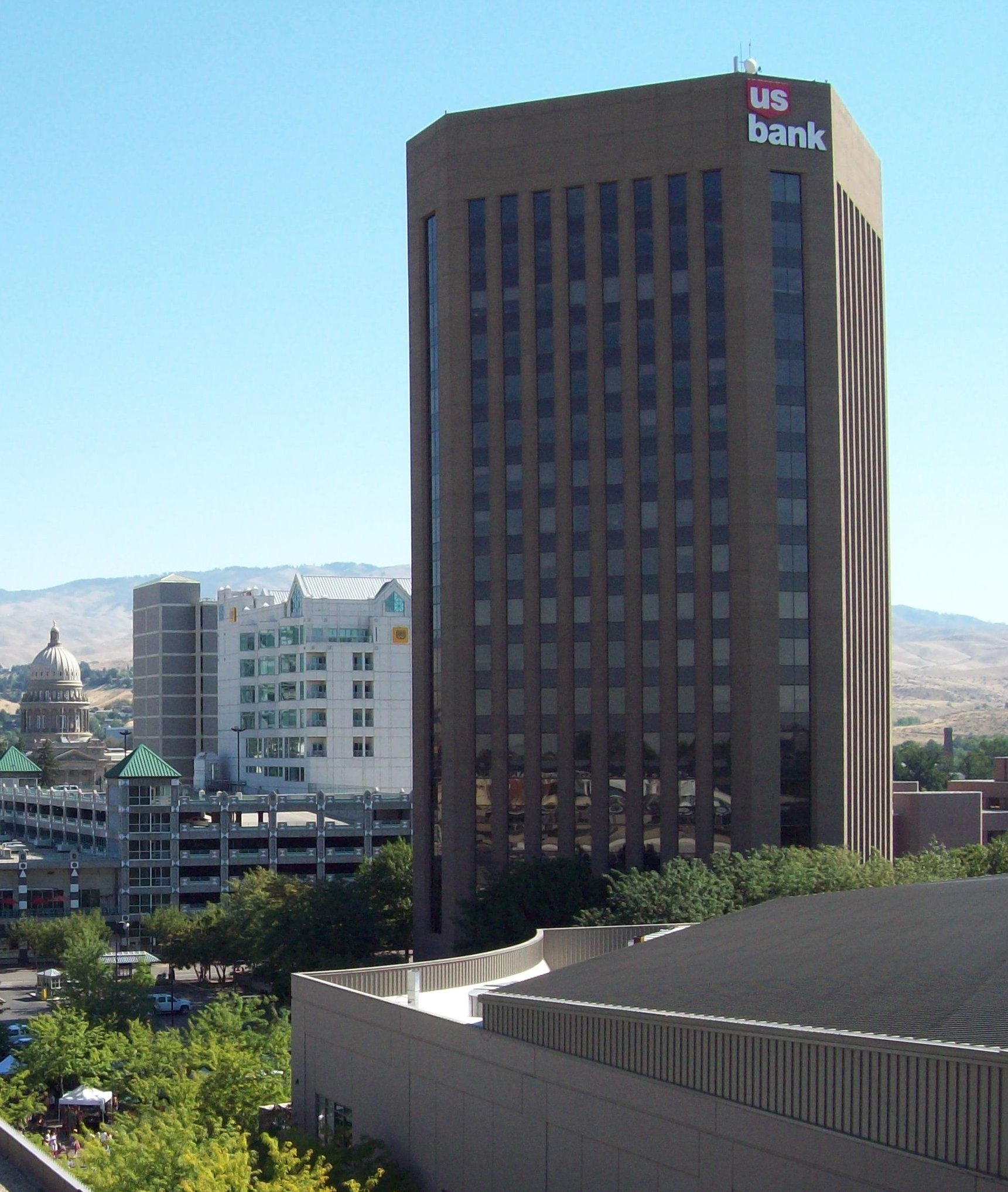
- US Bank Building in August 2008
- Interactive map of the US Bank Building area
- Former names: US Bank Plaza (1989–2013); West One Plaza (1989–95); Idaho First Plaza (1978–89)

General information
- Type: Office
- Location: Boise, Idaho, U.S., 101 S. Capitol Blvd.
- Coordinates: 43.615°N 116.203°W
- Groundbreaking: 1976
- Completed: 1978; 48 years ago
- Opened: September 16, 1978; 47 years ago
- Renovated: 2004
- Owner: Laird Norton

Height
- Roof: 267 ft (81 m)

Technical details
- Floor count: 19
- Floor area: 256,197 sq ft (23,800 m^{2})
- Lifts/elevators: 6 passenger, 1 freight 2 parking garage

Design and construction
- Main contractor: EmKay Development and Realty Co.

Other information
- Parking: 244-car two-level below-grade garage

The US Bank Building is a high-rise building in the western United States, located in Boise, Idaho. Completed 48 years ago in 1978 and renovated in 2004, it rises 267 feet (81 m) spanning 19 floors. The tallest building in the state for over thirty years, it was surpassed by the 323-foot (98 m) Eighth & Main Building, which opened in 2014.

== History ==
Originally "Idaho First Plaza," the building was the headquarters of the Idaho First National Bank, which was founded in 1867. Built by EmKay Development and Realty Company, a wholly owned subsidiary of Boise-based Morrison-Knudsen, it opened in September 1978.

Following acquisitions in neighboring states, IFNB changed its name to West One Bank in 1989, and was acquired by U.S. Bank of Portland in 1995.

In 2000, the building was purchased by the property development firm Unico.

The building does not have a 13th floor. It is home to an annual Christmas tree display atop its roof that adds 85 feet (26 m) to the building's height; due to the extended height, the Federal Aviation Administration requires it to remain lit with safety beacons. The U.S. Bank Building was the tallest structure in Idaho until a new air traffic control tower at Boise Airport surpassed it in 2010.

The office tower was bought on $37 million loan in 2013 by Salt Lake City based Gardner Company, which developed nearby Eighth & Main. It was then sold at an undisclosed price to Seattle-based Laird Norton in 2019.

== See also ==
- List of tallest buildings by U.S. state
- List of tallest buildings in Boise
