= Mangrove Tower =

- Location within Puerto Rico

General information
- Status: Proposed
- Location: Milla de Oro, 125 Arterial B Avenue, San Juan, Puerto Rico
- Coordinates: 18°25′48″N 66°03′40″W
- Named for: Mangrove

Height
- Height: 206.5 metres (677 ft)

Technical details
- Floor count: 55 (2 additional below ground)

Design and construction
- Architect: Clara Tresgallo Parés

The Mangrove Tower was a proposed multipurpose skyscraper for San Juan, Puerto Rico, that if built, would have been the tallest building in the Caribbean.

== History ==
The building was to be located on the Martin Peña Channel waterfront across the street from the José Miguel Agrelot Coliseum and right next to the Milla de Oro area. The proposal took inspiration from the mangrove trees located on the channel. The building would be composed of four distinct towers which would twist together similar to the mangrove branches, giving people the opportunity to move horizontally and diagonally. The entanglement of the different structures would be hidden behind a façades with different treatments, such as an "interlaced net" mimicking a mangrove. The mangrove-tree inspiration would be further stressed by the use of vegetation and water features throughout the structure. It would have "house[d] apartments, businesses, public spaces and...a hotel," and "direct access to the area’s bus and train stations [as well as a] future connection to a ferry stop."

If built, the Mangrove Tower would have been Puerto Rico's "first true skyscraper" at 206.5 metres (677 ft) as it would have exceeded the 150 metres (490 ft) threshold to be considered a skyscraper, since the tallest high-rise building in Puerto Rico is the Caribbean Sea View which stands at 102 metres (335 ft).

The lot is now home to the Trocadero Diverplex, which houses commercial, entertainment and tourism spaces.
