= Rhodes Park =

- Rhodes Skatepark
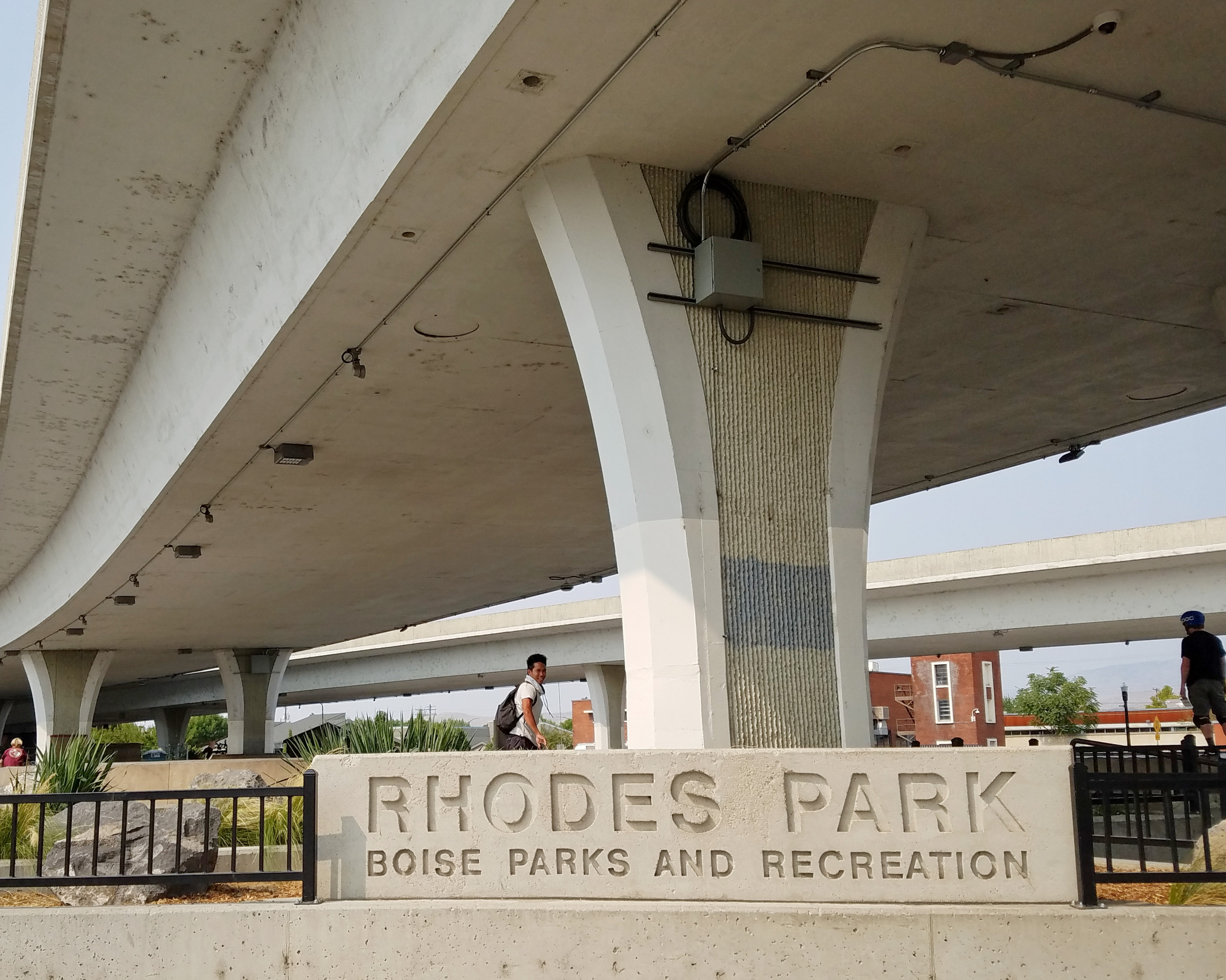
- Rhodes Skatepark
- Interactive map of Rhodes Park
- Type: Skatepark
- Location: 1555 W Front St. Boise, Idaho
- Coordinates: 43°37′05″N 116°12′50″W
- Area: 1.28 acres (0.52 ha)
- Created: 1995
- Operator: Boise Parks and Recreation

Rhodes Park, also known as Rhodes Skatepark, is a 1.28-acre (0.52 ha) skatepark between 15th and 16th Streets under Interstate 184 in Boise, Idaho, USA. The park is managed by the Boise Parks and Recreation Department and includes skateboarding and parkour challenges.

== History ==
The park, which bears Glenn Rhodes' name, was first marketed and constructed, and it debuted in 1995. In 2016 the park reopened after a renovation by Grindline Skateparks.

Rhodes Park has been featured by ESPN as a pre-qualifier venue for X Games.

In 2018 a skateboarder died from injuries from a fall at Rhodes Park. The cause of death was rhabdomyolysis, blood toxins resulting from muscle tissue deterioration after an injury.

== See also ==
- List of parks in Boise
