= Hoff Building =

Historic office building in Boise, Idaho

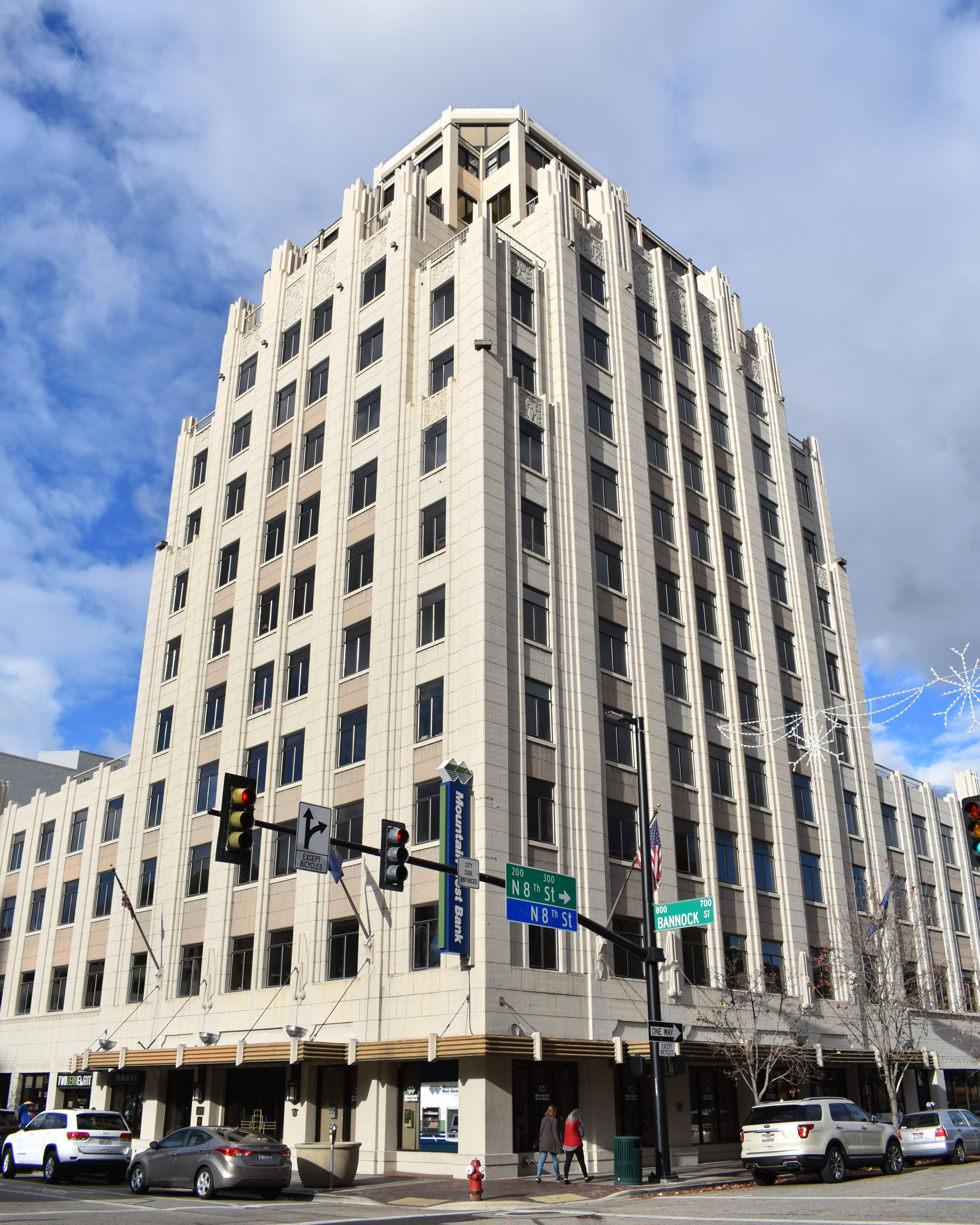
- The Hoff Building in 2018
- Interactive map of the Hoff Building area
- Former names: Hotel Boise (1930–1976)

General information
- Type: Hotel (1930–1976); Office (1976–present)
- Architectural style: Art Deco
- Location: 802 W. Bannock Street, Boise, Idaho, United States
- Coordinates: 43°37′02.4″N 116°12′07.4″W
- Named for: Hans T. Hoff; Founder, Hoff Companies
- Groundbreaking: June 17, 1930
- Completed: December 15, 1930
- Opened: December 21, 1930; 95 years ago
- Cost: $279,600 ($5.39 million in 2025); A later estimate was $639,000 ($12.3 million in 2025)

Height
- Height: 165 feet (50 m)

Technical details
- Floor count: 11 (1930); 13 (1976)

Design and construction
- Architect: Frank K. Hummel
- Architecture firm: Tourtellotte & Hummel
- Developer: Walter E. Pierce
- Main contractor: Morrison-Knudsen

Other information
- Number of rooms: 400

Website
- www.icreboise.com/802-w-bannock
- Hoff Building
- U.S. National Register of Historic Places
- U.S. Historic district – Contributing property
- Part of: Boise Capitol Area District
- NRHP reference No.: 76000663
- Added to NRHP: May 12, 1976; 50 years ago

The Hoff Building is an historic building in the western United States, located in Boise, Idaho. Designed by Boise architects Tourtellotte & Hummel, it was constructed 96 years ago in 1930 in the style of Art Deco. Known as Hotel Boise until 1976, the building is a contributing resource in the Boise Capitol Area District, listed on the National Register of Historic Places since May 12, 1976.

At eleven floors in 1930, the building is considered Boise's first skyscraper and is the eleventh-tallest building in the city.

== History ==
Hotel Boise was constructed in 1930 for Boise developer Walter E. Pierce on the former site of a Methodist church. The building included 400 hotel rooms and ten apartments; the commercial tenants included Leah's Corner Cupboard giftshop, Veda Renfro's Artistic Beauty Salon, Lee McClelland's Barber Shop, the North American Automobile Association, and the Hotel Boise Cab Company. The first hotel manager was Earl McInnis. The hotel was a founding member of Western Hotels on August 27. 1930, and remained part of the chain until September 30, 1966.

Hotel Boise operated from 1930 until 1976, when it was sold to Hoff Companies, Inc. The new owner changed the name to Hoff Building, renovated the building for office space, added two floors, and removed Art Deco features. Two years later the building was sold to EBCO Inc., and the Art Deco details were reinstalled.

== See also ==
- List of tallest buildings in Boise
- Downtown Boise
