= One Capital Center =

High rise building in Boise, Idaho

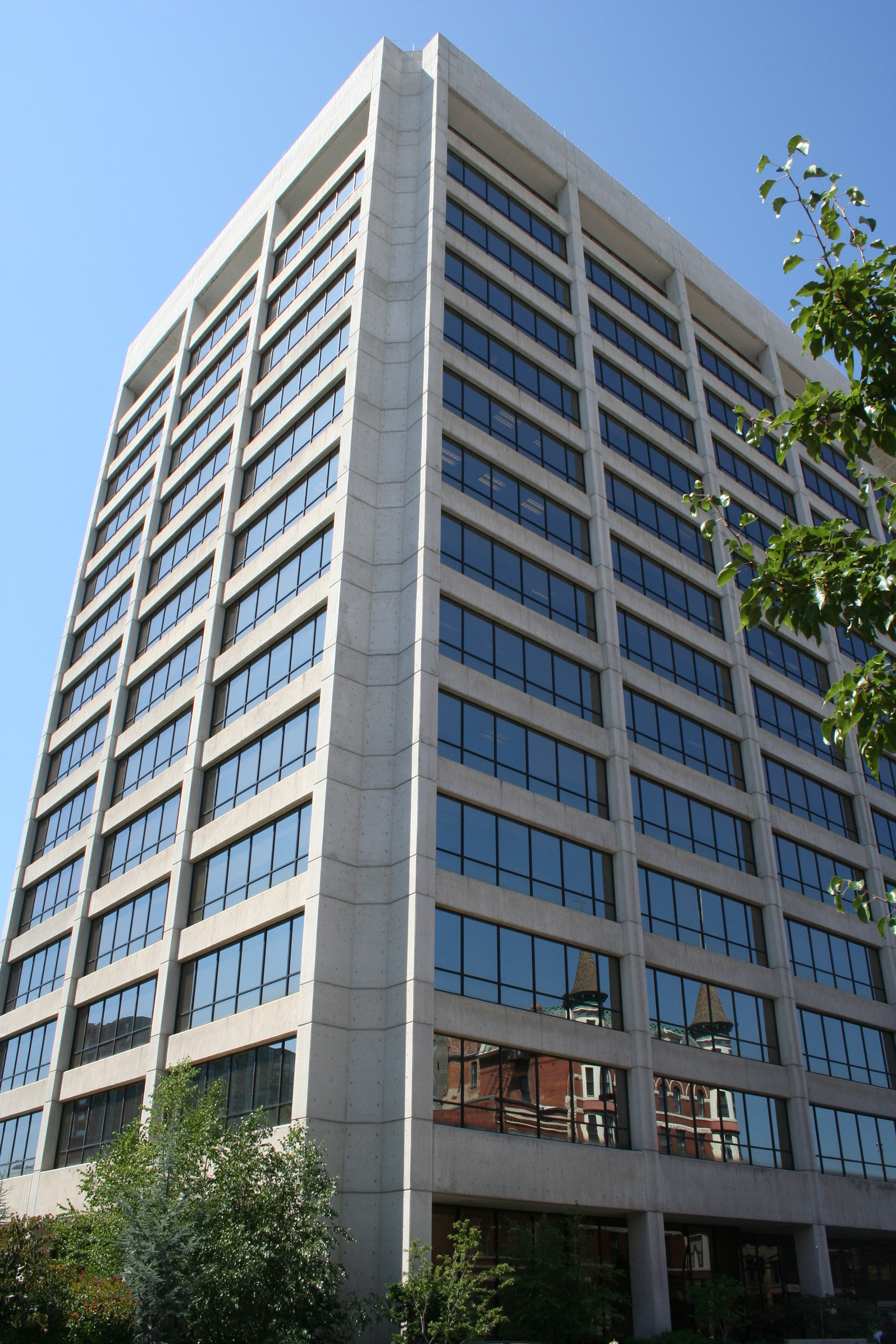

General information
- Status: Completed
- Location: 999 Main St. Boise, Idaho, United States
- Coordinates: 43.616803°N 116.205845°W
- Completed: 1975

Height
- Roof: 206 ft (63 m)

Technical details
- Floor count: 14

Website
- onecapitalcenter.com

One Capital Center is a high rise building in Boise, Idaho. It is located at 999 Main Street. The building has 14 floors and is 206 feet tall and was completed in 1975 by Mountain Bell. From 1975 to 1978 it was the tallest building in the city of Boise and the state of Idaho, but now it is the fourth tallest building in Boise.

Billionaire J. R. Simplot (1909–2008) had an office on the 13th floor of the building.

== See also ==
- List of tallest buildings in Boise
