= Idaho State Capitol =

State capitol building of the U.S. state of Idaho

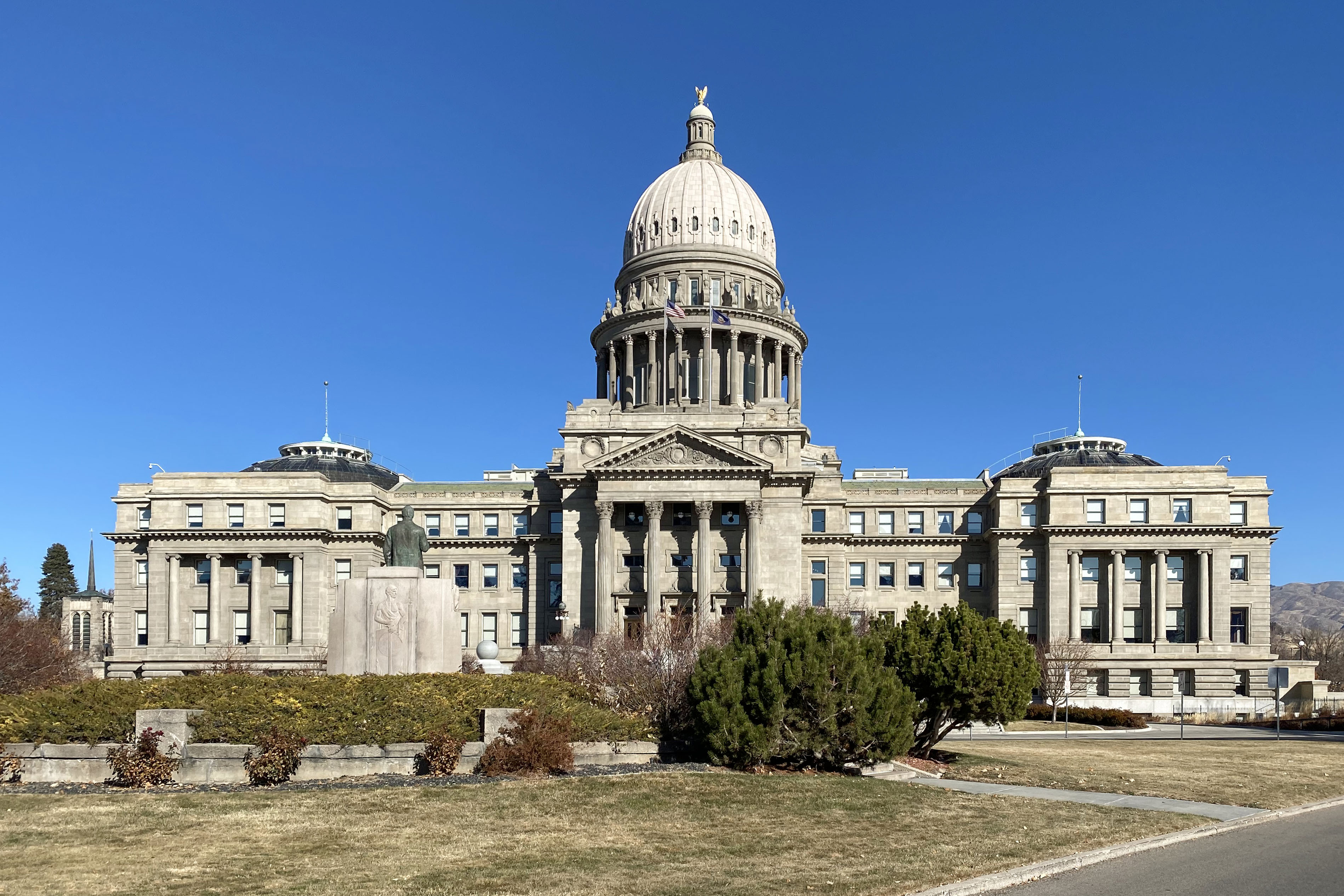
- View from southwest in November 2019

General information
- Architectural style: Classical Revival
- Location: 700 West Jefferson Street; Boise, Idaho, U.S.
- Coordinates: 43.6177°N 116.1996°W
- Construction started: 1905; 121 years ago
- Completed: 1912; 114 years ago 1920 (wings)
- Cost: $2,098,455
- Owner: State of Idaho

Height
- Height: 208 feet (63 m)

Technical details
- Floor area: 201,720 sq ft (4.631 acres; 18,740 m^{2})

Design and construction
- Architects: John E. Tourtellotte; Charles Hummel
- Idaho State Capitol
- U.S. National Register of Historic Places
- U.S. Historic district – Contributing property
- Part of: Boise Capitol Area District
- NRHP reference No.: 76000663
- Added to NRHP: May 12, 1976

The Idaho State Capitol in Boise is the home of the government of the U.S. state of Idaho. Although Lewiston briefly served as Idaho's capital city from the formation of the old federal Idaho Territory in 1863, the territorial legislature moved it to Boise on December 24, 1864. It continued as such following the admission of the Territory as the 43rd state in the federal Union on July 3, 1890, the day before Independence Day, when a 43rd white star was added officially to the American Flag.

Construction of the first portion of the new state capitol building began in the summer of 1905, fifteen years after 43rd statehood, and the designing architects were John E. Tourtellotte (1869–1939), and Charles Hummel, in their architectural firm / partnership of Tourtellotte & Hummel (now named Hummel Architects). Tourtellotte was a Connecticut native whose career began in Massachusetts and continued when he moved west to Boise. Hummel was a German American immigrant who partnered with Tourtellotte in 1901. The final cost of the building was just over $2 million; it was completed fifteen years later in 1920. The architects used varied materials to construct the building and their design was inspired by the Classical style of architecture of Ancient Rome and Ancient Greece for examples. Its sandstone exterior is dug and cut from the state-owned quarry at nearby Table Rock in Ada County, Idaho.

The now historic landmark building was included in the Boise Capitol Area District listing on the U.S. National Register of Historic Places on May 12, 1976 (lists maintained by the National Park Service of the United States Department of the Interior).

== Construction of the original building ==
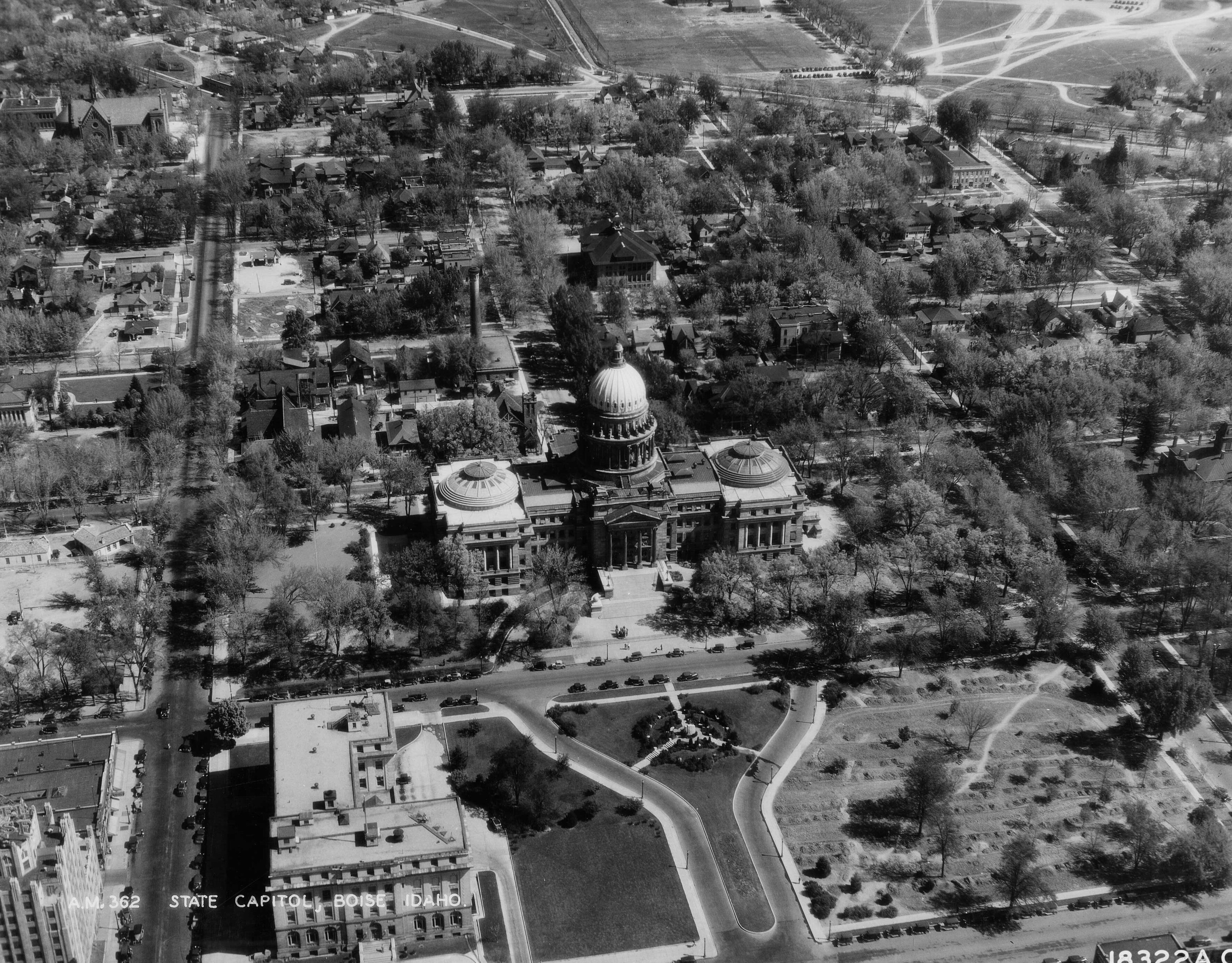
1920s

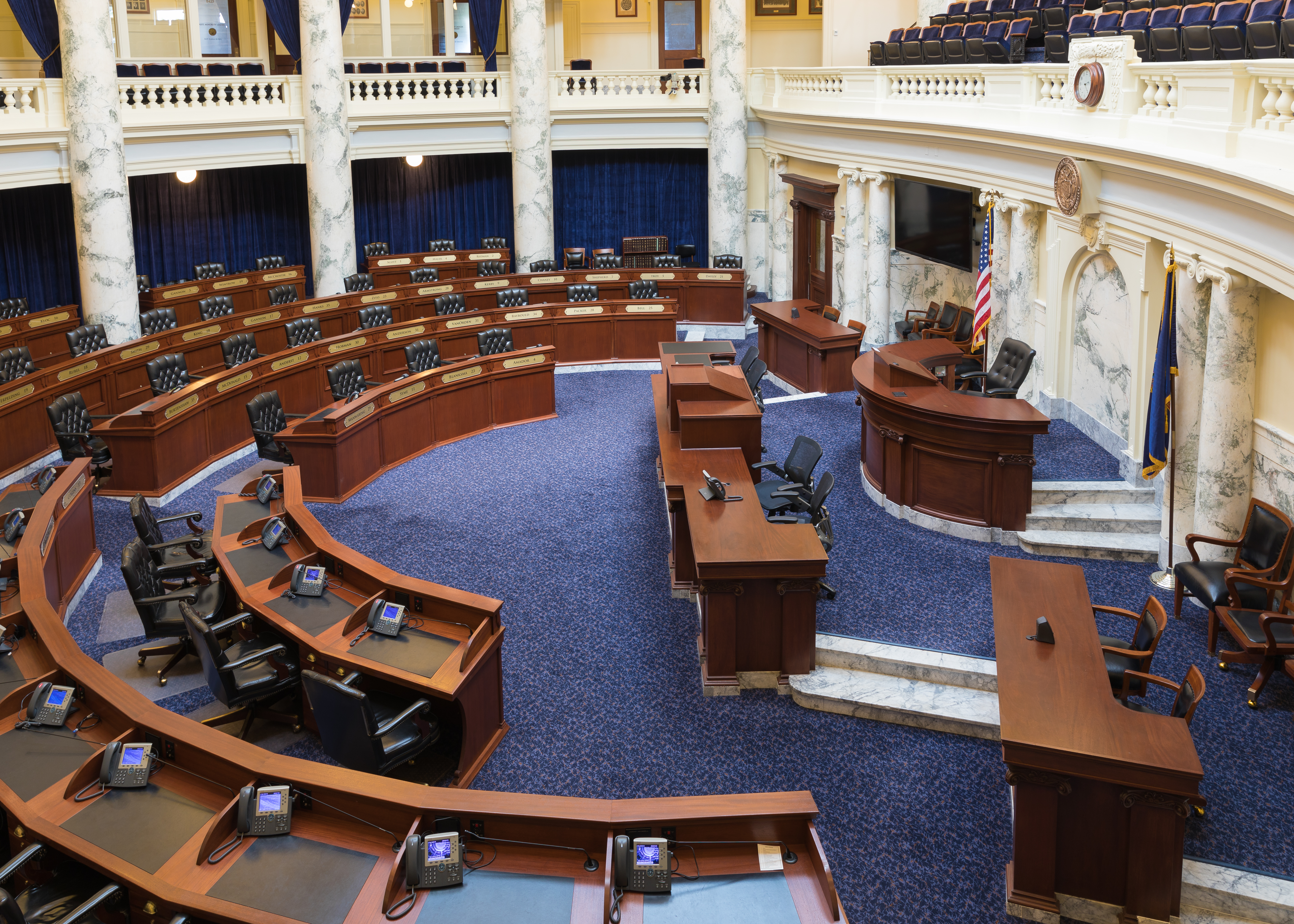
Chamber of the House of Representatives in 2018

Tourtellotte and Hummel used four types of marble: red marble from Georgia, gray marble from Alaska, green marble from Vermont, and black marble from Italy. Architectural inspirations included St. Peter’s Basilica in Rome, St Paul's Cathedral in London and the U.S. Capitol in Washington, D.C. The most prominent feature of the capitol is its dome. Surmounting this dome is a bronze eagle, 5 feet 7 inches (1.70 m) tall. The capitol building is 208 feet (63 m) high, occupies an area of 201,720 square feet (18,740 m^{2}), and contains over 50,000 square feet (4,600 m^{2}) of artistically carved marble.

There are 219 pillars in the original building—Doric, Corinthian, or Ionic—and each pillar is made up of marble dust, plaster and scagliola. Scagliola is a mixture of granite, marble dust, gypsum and glue dyed to look like marble. This artificial marble was created by a family of artisans in Italy.

On the first floor of the capitol building, when looking upward to the dome, 13 large stars and 43 smaller stars can be seen. The 13 large stars represent the thirteen original colonies and the 43 smaller stars indicate that Idaho was the forty-third state to enter the union. The floor contains a compass rose; in its center is a sundial that has minerals found in Idaho. The first floor also houses a statue called the Patriot by Kenneth Lonn, for those who worked in the mining industry.

The second floor may be accessed via three entrances; from the east, south, and west. The lieutenant governor’s office is located in the west wing, just opposite the governor’s office. On the north side of the second floor rotunda is a sculpture of George Washington astride a horse; to its rear is the attorney general’s suite of offices, which formerly housed the Idaho Supreme Court, until its current building opened in 1970. The east wing houses the office of the secretary of state offices, in whose reception area is the official copy of the Great Seal of the State of Idaho.

The third floor contains the Senate in the west wing and the House of Representatives in the east wing. The two chambers were remodeled in 1968. Also on this floor is the old Supreme Court room, now used for hearings and committee meetings of the Joint Finance and Appropriations Committee. Balcony entrances on the fourth floor of the senate and house galleries, which enable the public to observe the legislature in session. The northeast, northwest, and southwest corners of this floor contain many historic paintings, as well as three murals by Dana Boussard.

== Restoration of the Capitol ==
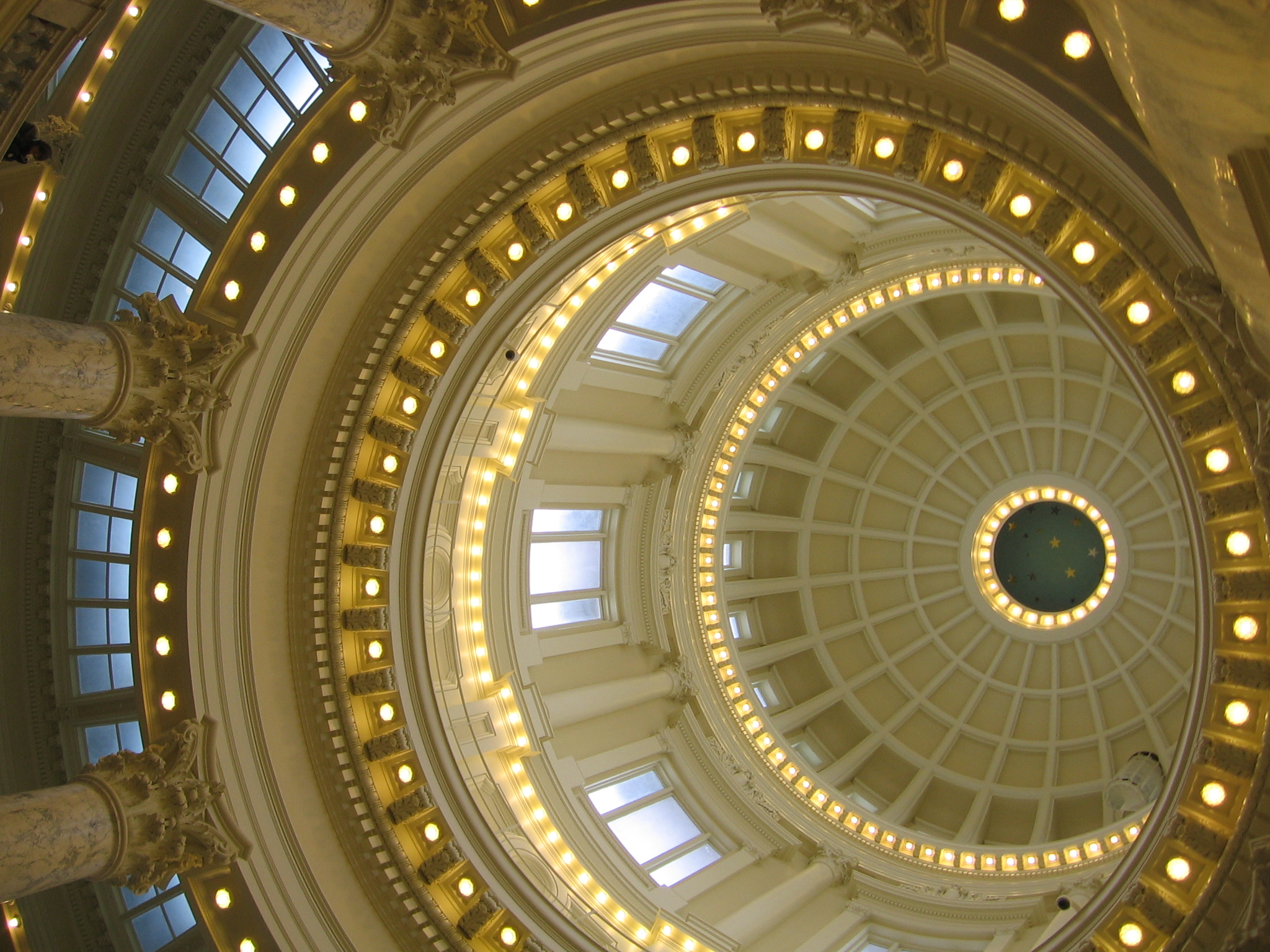
Renovated capitol dome

In 1998, Idaho officials drafted a master plan to restore the Capitol. Though it has many impressive features, the "Statehouse" had begun to fade with age. The interior restoration work would include restoration and refinishing of windows, repairs to marble flooring and decorative plaster, restoration of wood floors, refinishing wood doors and restoring hardware, upgrading electrical, smoke and fire-detection systems, improving exterior lighting, adding an emergency power generator, and installation of an elevator accessible to disabled persons.

In 2006, the Legislature voted to finance two two-level underground legislative office wings at a cost about $130 million. However, in view of the U.S. national economic downturn of the Great Recession in 2008–2009, then 32nd Governor of Idaho Butch Otter (born 1942, served 2007–2019), proposed less underground digging depth and constructing only single-level underground wings. After legislators agreed to this budget modification, construction began and continued until 2010, when both interior and exterior renovations were finished.

=== Scagliola ===
Plasterers were tasked with restoring scagliola, a composite of selenite, glue, and natural pigments, imitating marble and other hard stones. Making scagliola is a laborious 15-step process, which has to be restarted if a single mistake is made. During its 1905–1920 construction, the Idaho State Capitol’s original architects used a combination of white marble and matching scagliola to create a "Capitol of Light," so called because the materials would glow in natural light in the rotunda.

==== Capitol art ====
The Winged Victory statue is a plaster replica of the original marble statue of Nike of Samothrace. The original statue was found on the island of Samothrace, in Greece, in 1863 by a French explorer. The statue has characteristic features of Hellenistic art. The people of France gave the replica to the United States as part of a gift after United States Armed Forces helped liberate France from Nazi German occupation of 1940–1944, at the end of the Second World War (1939/1941–1945). After it arrived in America in February 1949, state officials placed the gift in the Boise Capitol.

The sculpture Statue head of Louise Shadduck honors the dedication of Idaho author, historian, civil servant, and political activist Louise Shadduck (1915–2008), who had died in 2008, at age 92. In 1958, Shadduck was elected the state's Secretary of Commerce and Development – the first woman to hold that office in the Governor's executive cabinet. The statue is made of bronze and black stone.

The Capitol also houses a display of a collection of 20 portraits of the early Idaho territorial and state Governors completed by artist Herbert A. Collins (1865–1937), completed in 1911.

== Attractions ==
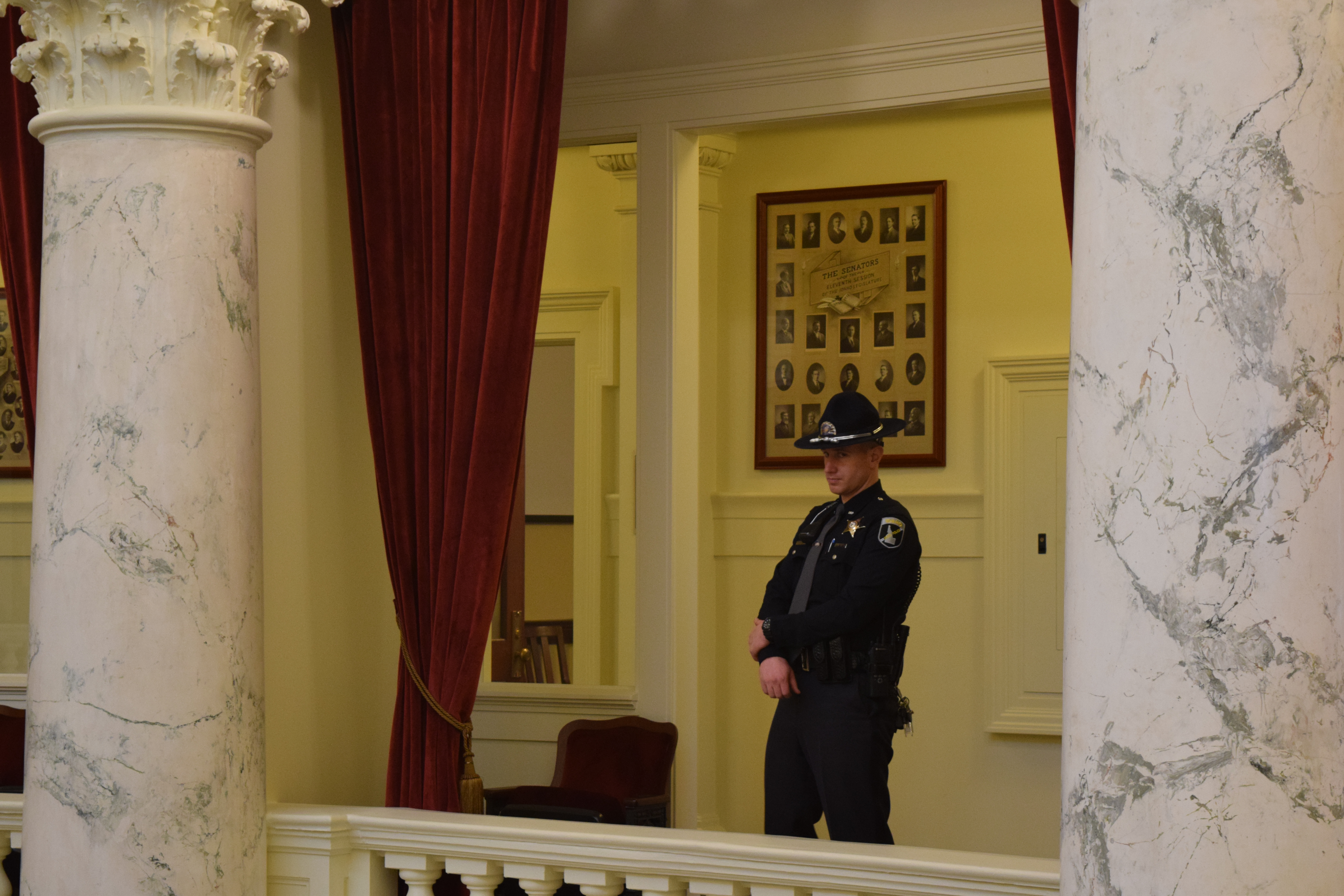
A state trooper at the capitol.

Attractions in the restored and expanded building include a gilded equestrian statue of George Washington and information about the historic trees that surrounded the capitol building before the grounds were cleared for underground construction. (Presidents Benjamin Harrison, Theodore Roosevelt, and William Taft planted trees on the property; Harrison planted a water oak, Roosevelt planted a Sugar Maple in 1903, and Taft planted the Ohio Buckeye in 1911.) The Golden Statue was carved by Charles Osner in 1869 from white pine, the state tree of Idaho. Osner worked by candlelight and took four years to finish the work.

== Details of the Capitol ==
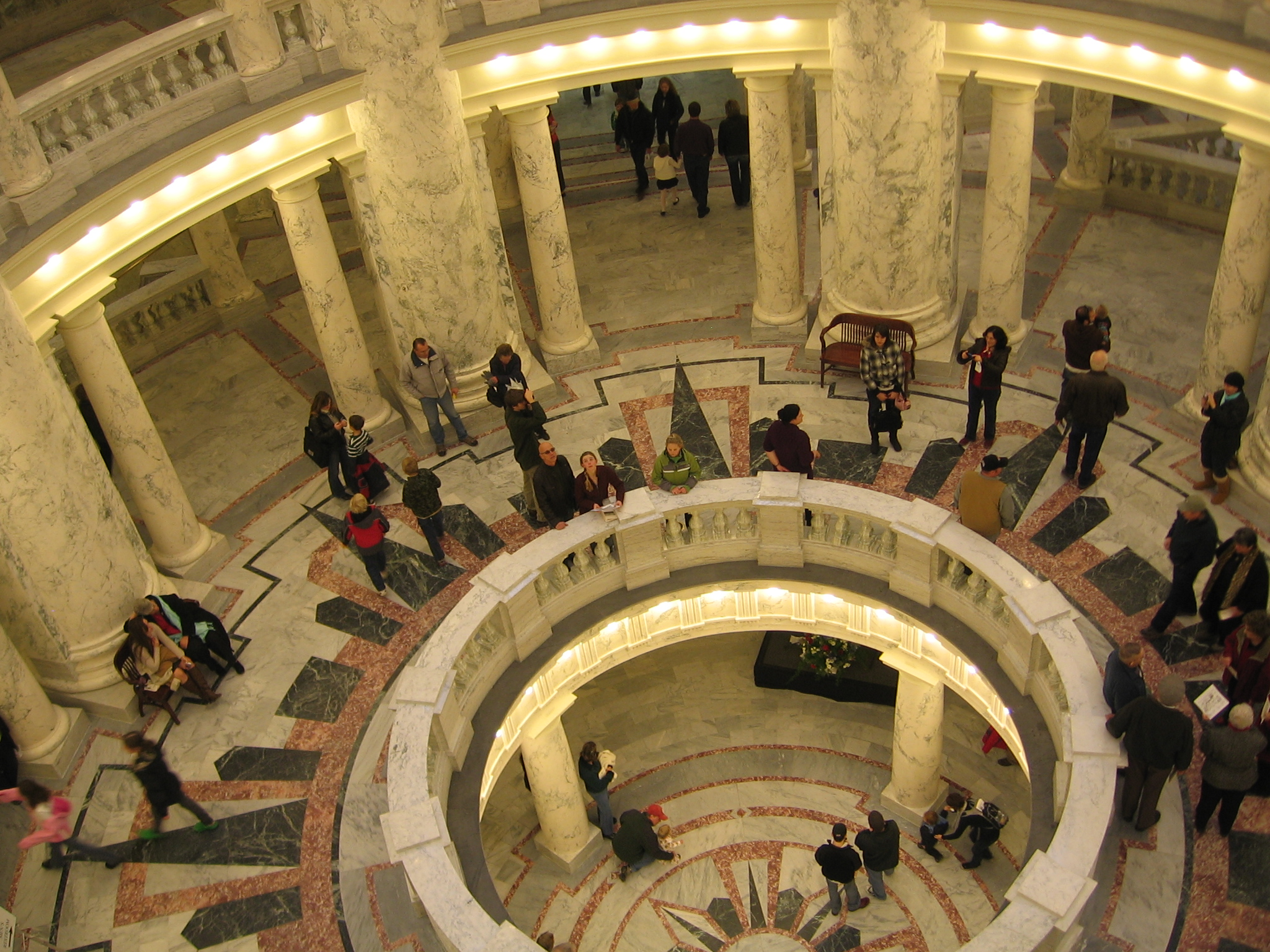
Visitors tour the restored Capitol in 2010.

Tunnels connect the Capitol Building to the Supreme Court building and other government buildings on Capitol Mall to the east. Used daily by government employees, these tunnels are not accessible to the public, and could serve as bomb shelters to protect the governor and other public officials.

A full-scale replica of the Liberty Bell (uncracked) occupies a site at the base of the stairs outside the Jefferson Street entrance. The bell is one of 53 commissioned in 1950 by the U.S. Treasury Department and presented to each of the states and is accessible to passersby who can ring it.

The capitol faces southwest and looks down Capitol Boulevard, about a mile (1.6 km) in length. At its opposite end is the Boise Depot, built in 1925 on the rim of the first bench.

Idaho's Capitol Building is the only one in the United States heated by geothermal water. The hot water is tapped and pumped from a source 3,000 feet (910 m) underground.

== See also ==
- List of Idaho state legislatures
- List of tallest buildings in Boise
- List of state and territorial capitols in the United States

== Book references ==
- Thomason, Frank (2009). Images of America: Boise. Acadia Publishing. pp. 30–32. ISBN 978-0738559896.
- MacGregor, Carol Lynn (2006). Boise, Idaho 1882-1910: Prosperity in Isolation. Mountain Press. p. 251. ISBN 978-0878425228.
- Hart, Arthur A. (2003). Historic Boise. Caxton Press. ISBN 978-0963125828.
