= Eighth & Main =

High-rise building in Boise, Idaho, USA

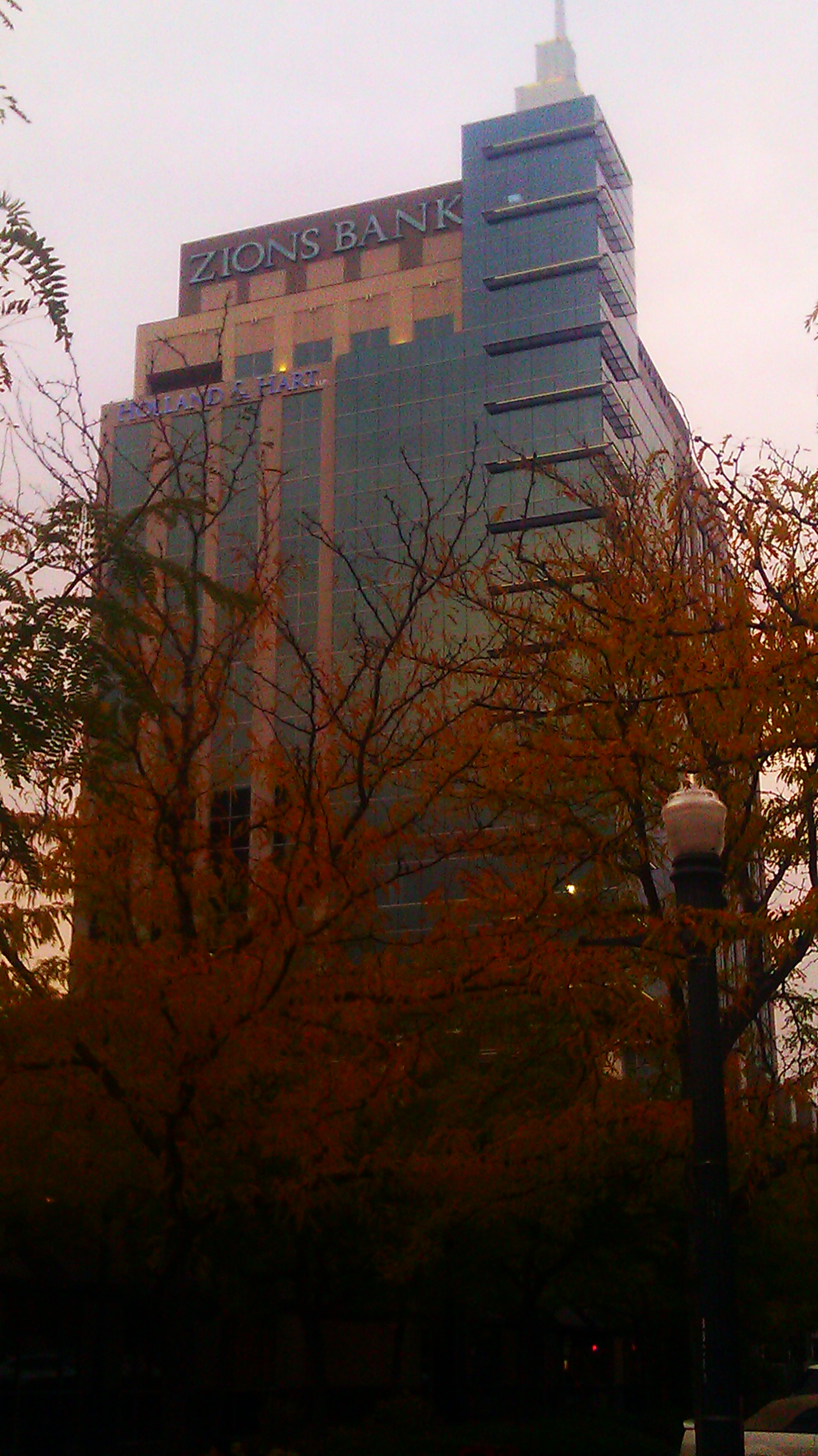
- Zions Bank Building in October 2013
- Interactive map of the Eighth & Main area

General information
- Status: Completed
- Type: Office & retail
- Location: 800 W. Main Street, Boise, Idaho, United States
- Coordinates: 43°36′58″N 116°12′13″W
- Groundbreaking: April 9, 2012
- Completed: 2014
- Opened: February 15, 2014; 12 years ago
- Client: Zions Bank
- Owner: Gardner Company

Height
- Antenna spire: 323 ft (98 m)
- Top floor: 216 ft (66 m)

Technical details
- Floor count: 18
- Floor area: 350,000 sq ft (33,000 m^{2})
- Lifts/elevators: 7

Design and construction
- Architects: CTA Architects Engineers, Architect of Record Babcock Design Group, Design Architect

Eighth & Main is an 18-story high-rise building in the western United States, located in Boise, Idaho. The tallest building in the state at 323 feet (98 m), it houses the Idaho headquarters of Zions Bank, as well as Holland & Hart and other companies. Construction was completed in early 2014, and a grand opening celebration was held on February 15. The location, formerly known as "the pit" and the "Boise Hole", had sat vacant since 1987.

Besides Zions Bank, other tenants include Holland & Hart LLP, Ruth's Chris Steak House, CTA Architects Engineers, First American Title Company, Clenera, LLC, and the Idaho Technology Council. Half of the top floor (17th Floor), known as the Idaho & Snake River Rooms, is available for limited public rental focused on non-profit and community-oriented events.

== Design ==
The building's spire was changed several times after complaints that it resembled similar spires used by the Church of Jesus Christ of Latter-day Saints (LDS Church).

== Former structures ==
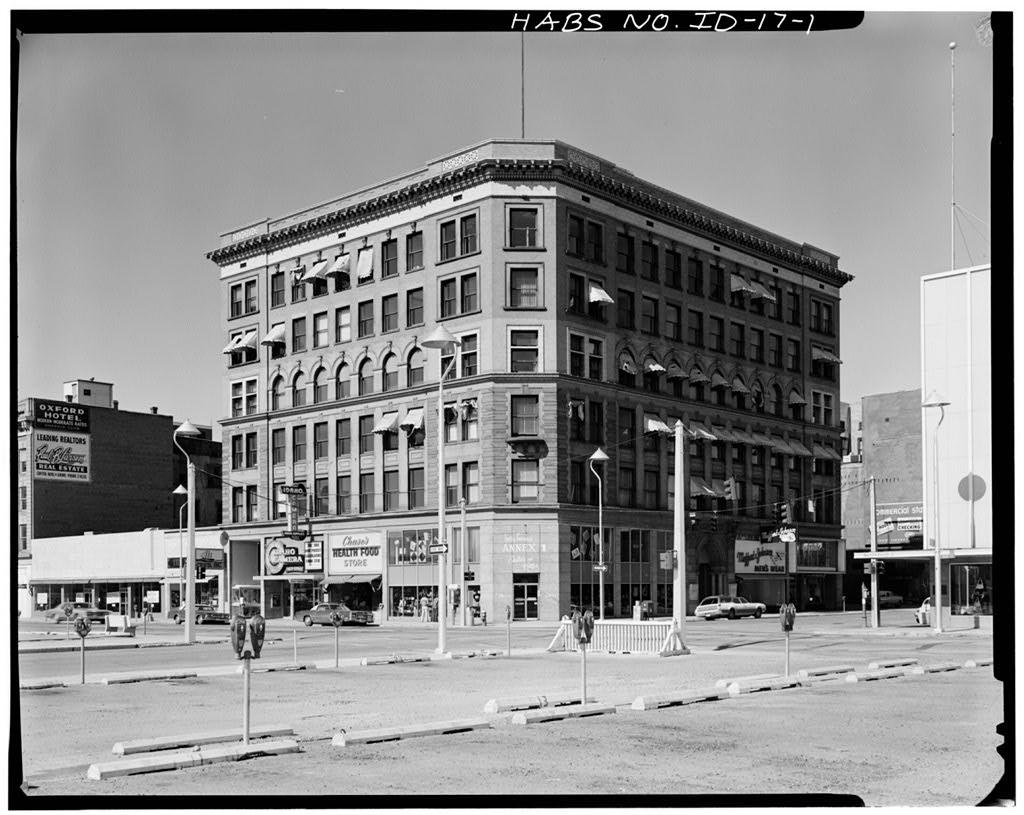
Eastman Building, circa 1970s

The Overland Hotel occupied the site from 1864 to 1904, and a noteworthy guest in 1870 was General William T. Sherman. The hotel was purchased by Hosea B. Eastman in 1877, and was the site of Boise's first telephone exchange in 1883. With the intent of building a new hotel it was demolished in 1904, but after estimates were deemed too expensive, Eastman decided on a retail and office building instead.

Until 1987, the site was occupied by the Eastman Building, designed by Tourtellotte and Company. Originally four stories when it opened in 1905 as the Overland Building, two more were added in 1910. It was renamed the Eastman Building in 1926 following the owner's death and was filled with legal, dental, and medical offices. It gradually fell from favor and it was acquired in 1972 by the Boise Redevelopment Agency for a proposed downtown mall. Slated for demolition in 1978, preservationist interests intervened and it stood idle for nearly another decade. An offer was made in 1981 to move it several blocks south to the 8th Street Marketplace. With plans finally set for its refurbishment, the Eastman Building was destroyed two days later by fire in January 1987, fought by more than one hundred firefighters for over a day and a half, and was demolished soon after.

== See also ==
- List of tallest buildings in Boise
