= List of Art Deco architecture in Idaho =

This is a list of buildings that are examples of the Art Deco architectural style in Idaho, United States.

Nuart Theatre, Blackfoot

== Blackfoot ==
- Eastern Idaho State Fair Building, Blackfoot
- Nuart Theatre, Blackfoot, 1930
- United States Post Office–Blackfoot Main, Blackfoot, 1936

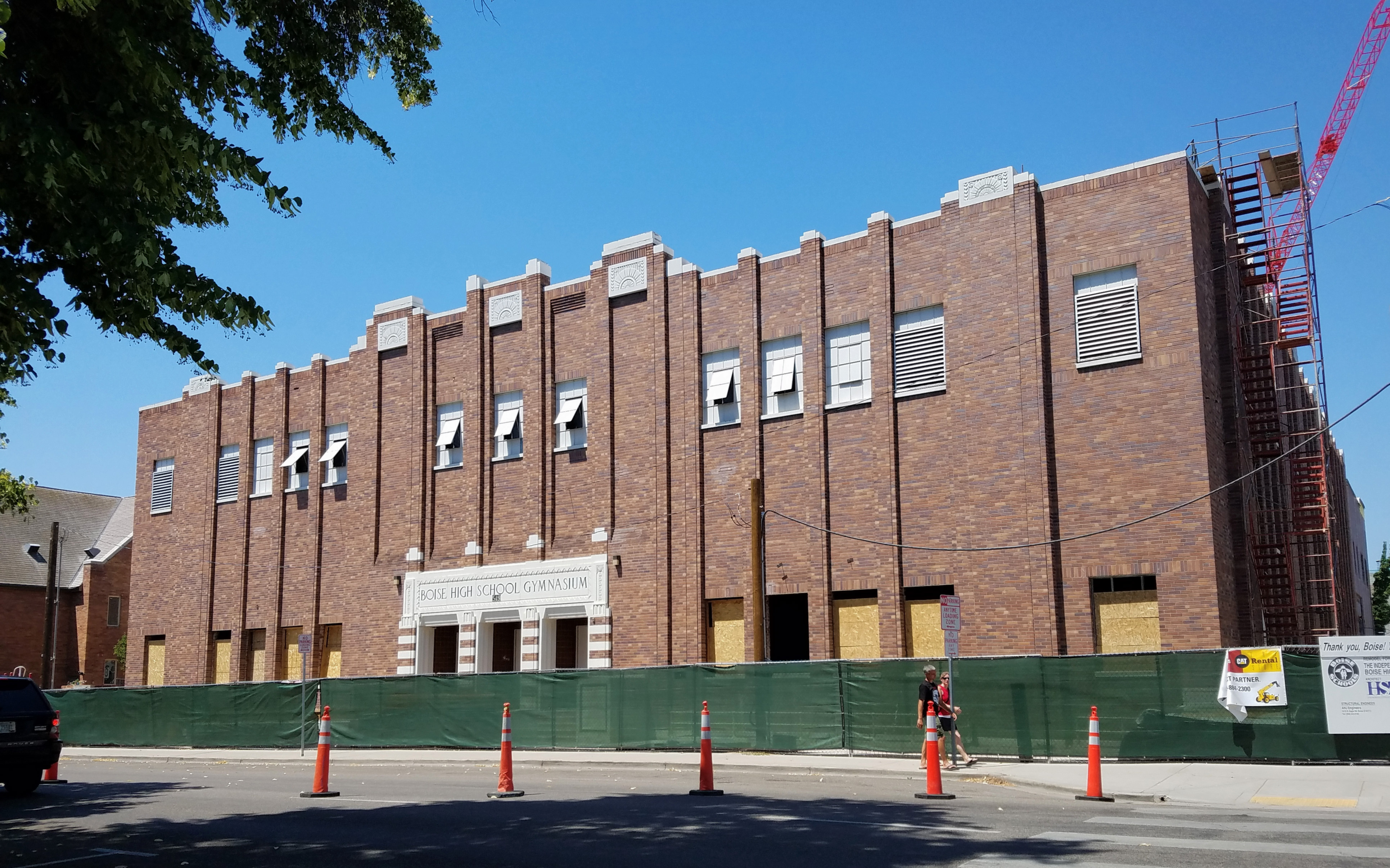
Boise High School Gymnasium, Boise

== Boise ==
- 4531 West Freemont, Boise, 1945
- Ada County Courthouse, Boise
- Banner Bank Building, Boise, 2007
- Baxter Apartment Building, Boise, 1941
- Boise Art Museum, Boise, 1937
- Boise High School Gymnasium, Boise
- Boise Junior High School, Boise, 1937
- Boise Municipal Pool, Boise, 1953
- The Egyptian Theatre, Boise, 1927
- Givens Pursley Building, Boise, 1938
- Hitchcock Building, Boise, 1919 and 1930s
- Hoff Building, Boise, 1930
- Idaho National Guard Armory, Boise, 1931
- Idaho Power Building, Boise, 1932
- John Regan American Legion Hall, Boise, 1939
- Kerhisnik Law Building (former Bruce Budge Medical Building), Boise, 1948
- Lowell Elementary, Boise, 1947
- Morris Hill Cemetery Mausoleum, Boise, 1937
- North Junior High School, Boise, 1937
- Reserve Street Armory, Boise, 1931
- St. Luke's Hospital, Boise, 1902 and 1928
- South Junior High, Boise, 1940s
- Sun Ray Cafe, Boise, 1900s and 1950s
- Veltex Building, Boise, 2002
- Washington Elementary, Boise, 1917 and 1947
- Whittier High School, Boise

== Idaho Falls ==
- Idaho Falls 5th Ward Meeting House, Idaho Falls, 1939
- Idaho Falls Idaho Temple, Idaho Falls, 1937
- S. H. Kress and Co. Building, Idaho Falls, 1932
- Smith–Hart Building, Idaho Falls

== Moscow ==
- Moscow High School, Moscow, 1939
- Moscow High School Auditorium, Moscow, 1939
- Nuart Theatre, Moscow, 1935

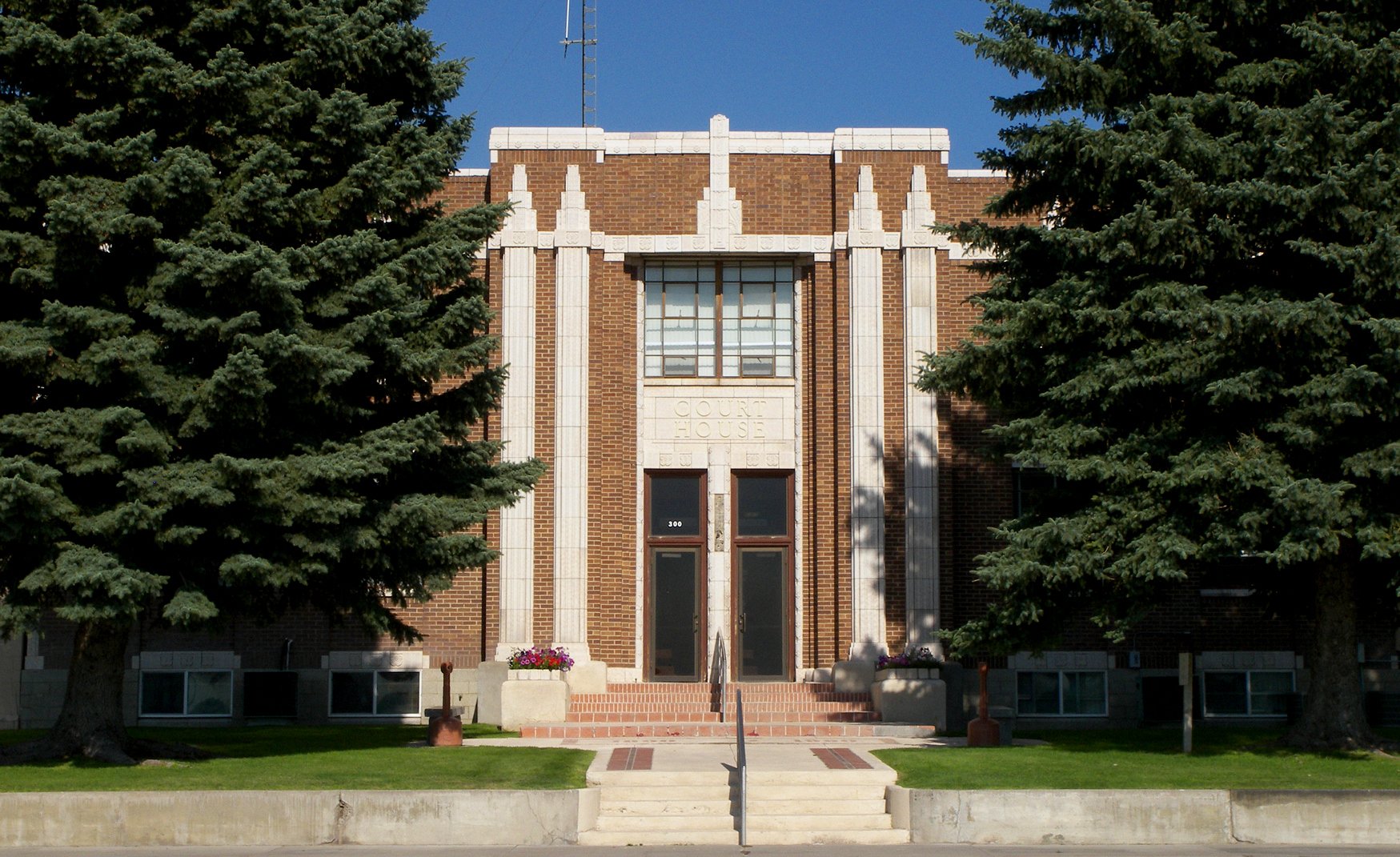
Jerome County Courthouse, Jerome

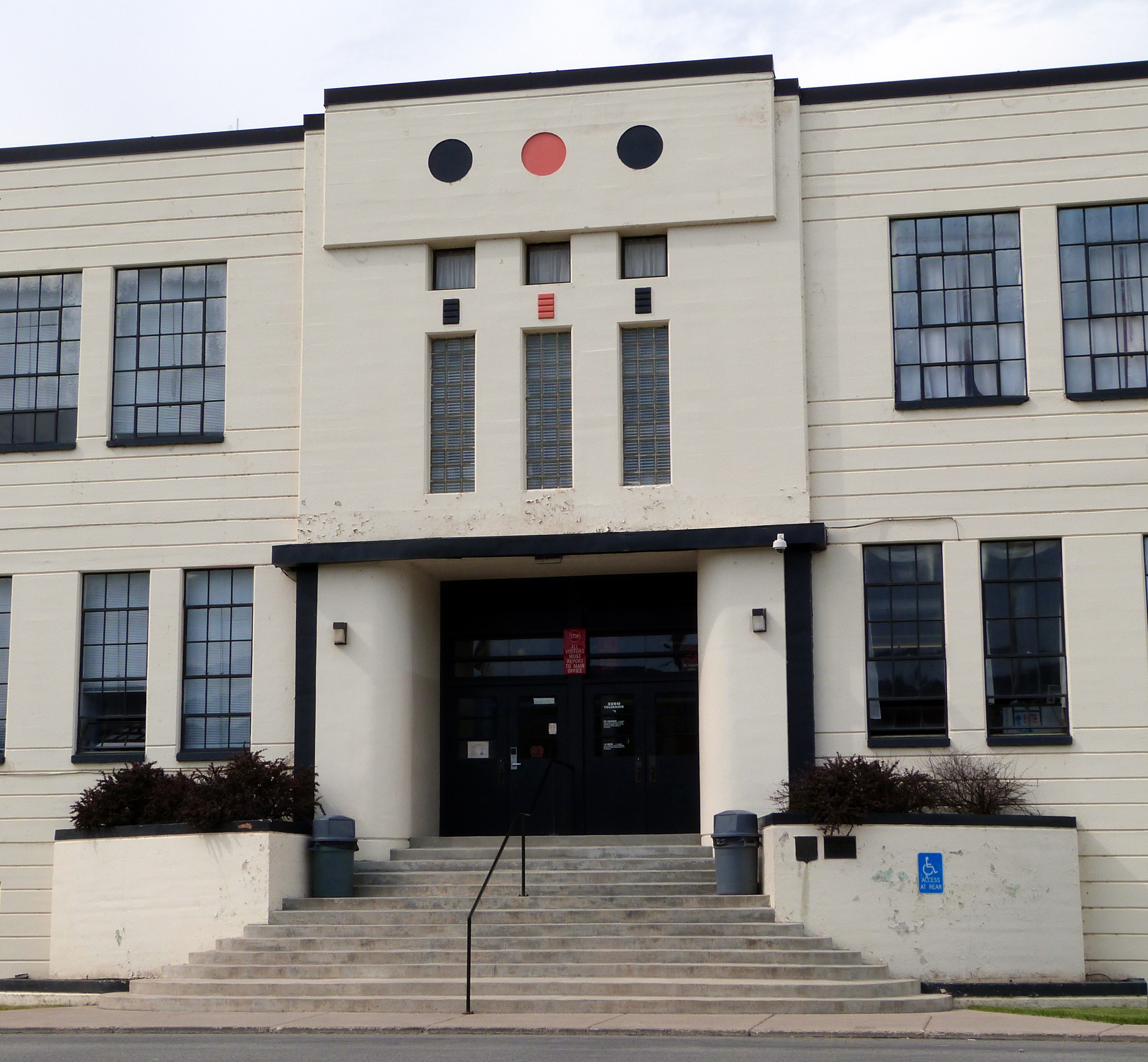
Priest River Junior High School, Priest River

== Other cities ==
- Arco City Building, Arco, 1938
- Auditorium Theatre, Pocatello, 1900, 1939
- Bear Lake Middle School, Montpelier, 1937
- Boundary County Courthouse, Bonners Ferry, 1941
- Canyon Springs High School, Caldwell, 1941
- Cassia County Courthouse, Burley, 1939
- City Building and Offices at First and East Center, Pocatello, 1921 and 1940
- Consolidated Wagon/Cain's Furniture Building, Twin Falls, 1909 and 1940s
- Day Rock Bar (former Liberty Theatre), Wallace, 1929
- Depot Sports Bar (former Greyhound Bus Depot), Pocatello, 1946
- Franklin County Courthouse, Preston, 1939
- Gem County Courthouse, Emmett, 1938
- Idaho State University Administration Building, Pocatello, 1939
- Jefferson County Courthouse, Rigby, 1938
- Jerome County Courthouse, Jerome, 1938
- KKOO Radio Station, Weiser, 1947
- L. A. Thomas Memorial Gymnasium, Kimberly, 1941
- Lewis–Clark State College Gymnasium, Lewiston, 1938
- Masonic Hall, Rupert Town Square Historic District, Rupert, 1953
- Oneida County Courthouse, Malad City, 1938
- Orpheum Theater, Twin Falls, 1921
- Owyhee County Courthouse, Murphy, 1936
- Parma Grade School, Parma, 1937
- Priest River Junior High (former High School), Priest River, 1939–1941
- Romance Theater, Rexburg, 1917
- Rupert City Hall, Rupert Town Square Historic District, Rupert, 1937
- Salmon City Hall and Library, Salmon, 1939
- School Gymnasium, Meridian
- Smith's Dairy Products (now Cloverleaf Creamery), Buhl, 1940s
- Star School Building, Star, 1939
- Star Theater, Weiser, 1917 and 1939
- Washington County Courthouse, Weiser, 1938
- United States Post Office, Buhl, 1939
- United States Post Office – Kellogg Main, Kellogg, 1938
- United States Post Office – Orofino Main, Orofino, 1940

== See also ==
- List of Art Deco architecture
- List of Art Deco architecture in the United States
