= Gwathmey =

Gwathmey is a surname. Notable people with the surname include:

- Charles Gwathmey (1938–2009), American architect
- James Tayloe Gwathmey (1862–1944), American physician
- Robert Gwathmey (1903–1988), American painter
- Rosalie Gwathmey (1908–2001), American photographer

== Other ==
- Gwathmey Siegel & Associates Architects, US-based architectural firm
