= Sedacca House =

House in New York designed by Charles Gwathmey

Coordinates: 41°00′14″N 72°14′17″W

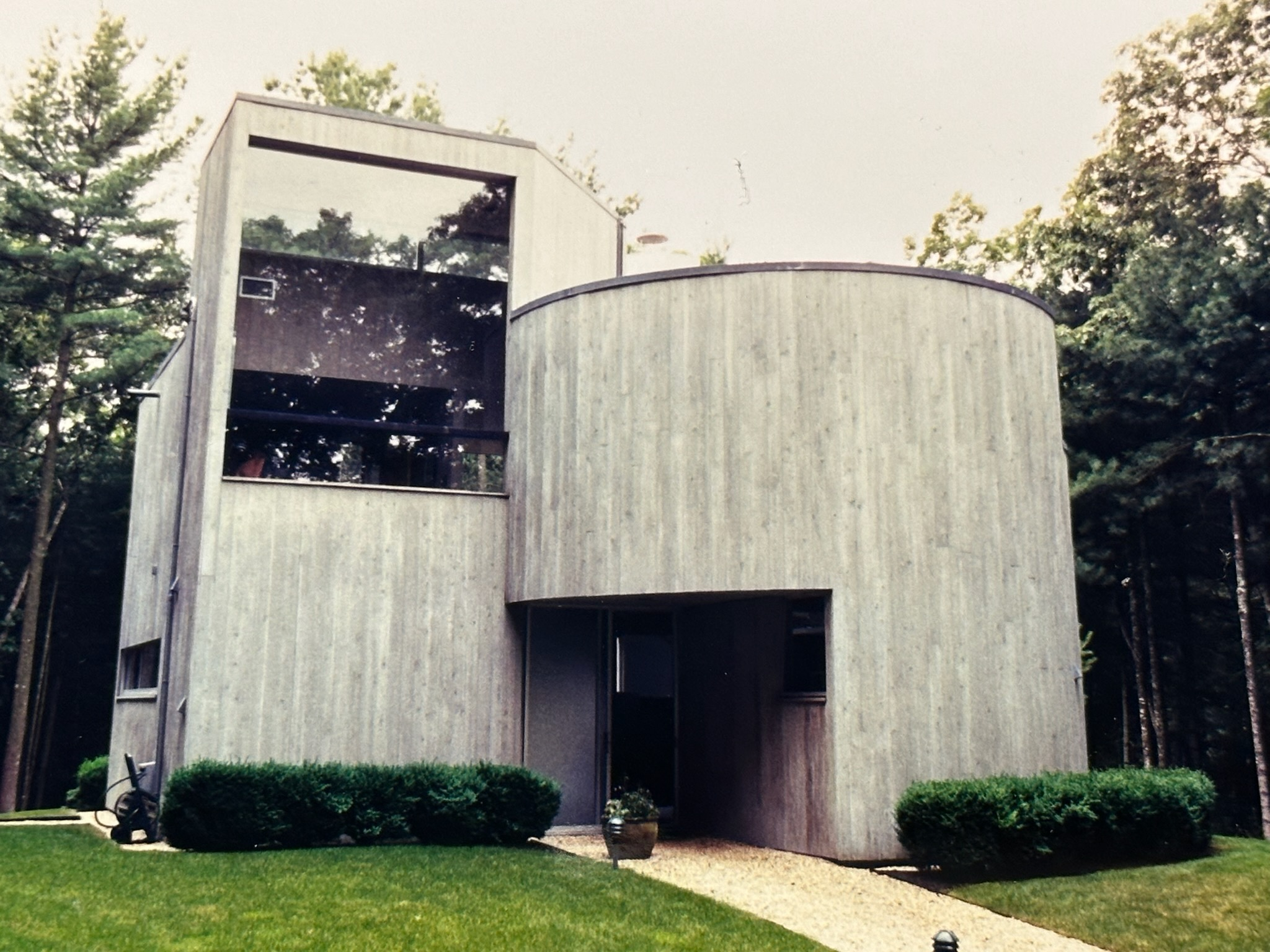
Sedacca House Front View

Joseph Sedacca Residence or Sedacca House in Northwest Harbor, New York is the third residential house designed by the American architect Charles Gwathmey (1938–2009).

The house, the curtilage of which covers 3 acres, was built by John Caramagna in 1968 is surrounded by tall white pine trees and dogwoods. It is the first modernist beach residence designed by the American architect Charles Gwathmey. After the 1100-square-feet house was built in 1968, the exterior combination with geometric shapes and blocks, plus its interior abundance use of glasses and steels with a stylish spiral staircase, made it stand out in a neighborhood dominated by shingle style Cape Cod houses. Sedacca House was frequently the background of wedding photos and appeared on the cover pages and articles of both American and other fashion and architecture magazines. In 1968, Sedacca House won the American Institute of Architects (AIA) New York Honor Award. In Gwathmey's words, "[It] broke the mold of the vernacular, shingle-style house and showed for the first time a modern house that was not imitative or historicist.” The Sedacca House has been sold a few times. Still, it receives significant local concern about added alteration and global attention as a distinguished modernist architecture in East Hampton.

== Background ==
Recommended by Paul Marvin Rudolph, an American architect and the chair of Yale University's Department of Architecture, Joseph Sedacca contracted the residence project from Rudolph's student Charles Gwathmey, who just received his Master of Architecture degree in 1962 from Yale School of Architecture and accomplished Robert Gwathmey Residence and Straus Residence. Joseph Sedacca was the graphic designer in the American Museum of Natural History and spent over thirty years as the manager of Exhibitions and Graphics Department. After several meetings and interviews, Sedacca and Gwathmey found they shared the same artistic inspiration and interest, leading to the birth of the modern beach house.
