= 51 Astor Place =

Office building in Manhattan, New York

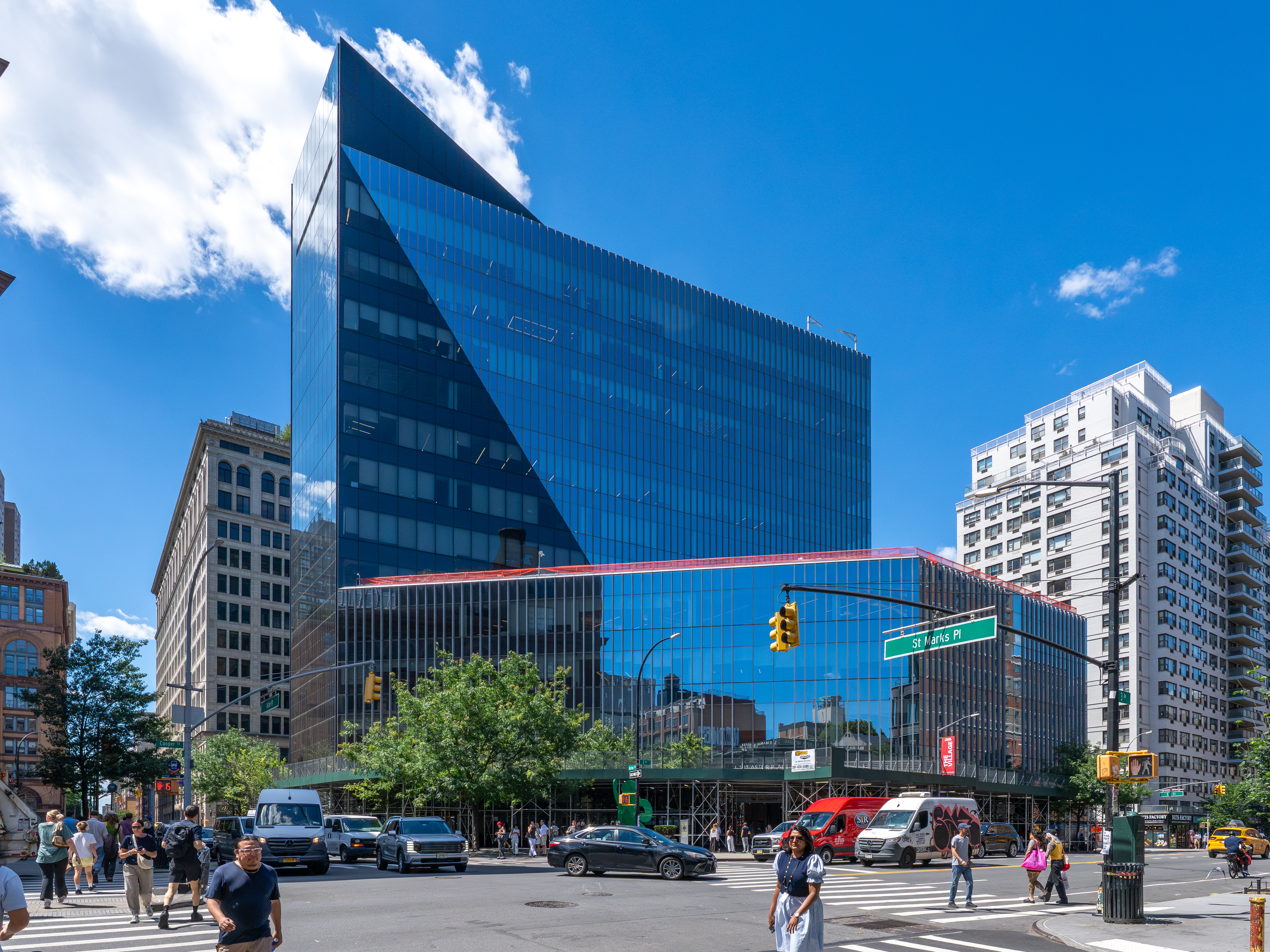
- (2026)

General information
- Type: Mixed-use
- Coordinates: 40°43′49″N 73°59′25″W

Height
- Roof: 183 feet (56 m)

Technical details
- Floor count: 13

Design and construction
- Architects: Fumihiko Maki, AAI Architects, P.C. (as architect of record)

51 Astor Place is an office building on Astor Place in the East Village neighborhood of Manhattan, New York City. It was developed by Edward J. Minskoff Equities. It is the headquarters of IBM's IBM Watson Group division. Like neighboring building Astor Place Tower, the black glass building designed by Fumihiko Maki was controversial for its architectural style and nicknamed "The Death Star" by locals.

== History ==
51 Astor is a product of permission given to Cooper Union to allow development on its grounds despite being a non-profit. The building was built on spec, without an anchor tenant for the building. The developer, Edward J. Minskoff, hoped to gain tenants from the financial and technology sectors.

The building was completed in 2013, and cost $300 million to construct. The offices entrance is on 4th Avenue.

== Usage ==
51 Astor is a mixed-use building, with three retail spaces on the ground floor. The anchor tenant is IBM. Others include St. John's University, Mail Online, Intuit, and a subsidiary of The Carlyle Group, Claren Road Asset Management.

== Design ==
The building was designed by Fumihiko Maki, who also designed 4 World Trade Center. The developer referred to the structure as "black glass with black granite and silver fins". Matt Chaban, writing for Observer, referred to the building as "one of the more interesting buildings built in the neighborhood since...41 Cooper Square...". 41 Cooper Square is a Cooper Union academic building.

The lobby includes a red Jeff Koons sculpture of a rabbit.

=== Controversy ===
The Greenwich Village Society for Historic Preservation opposed the building's development, largely due to the fact that the building's style is markedly different from that of the surrounding neighborhood. Both the style and the high prices the building asks for rent have been seen as eroding the neighborhood's character.

The controversy over 51 Astor's design is similar to the one that faced the neighboring Astor Place Tower.
