= Idaho National Guard Armory =

Historic building in Boise, Idaho

- U.S. National Register of Historic Places
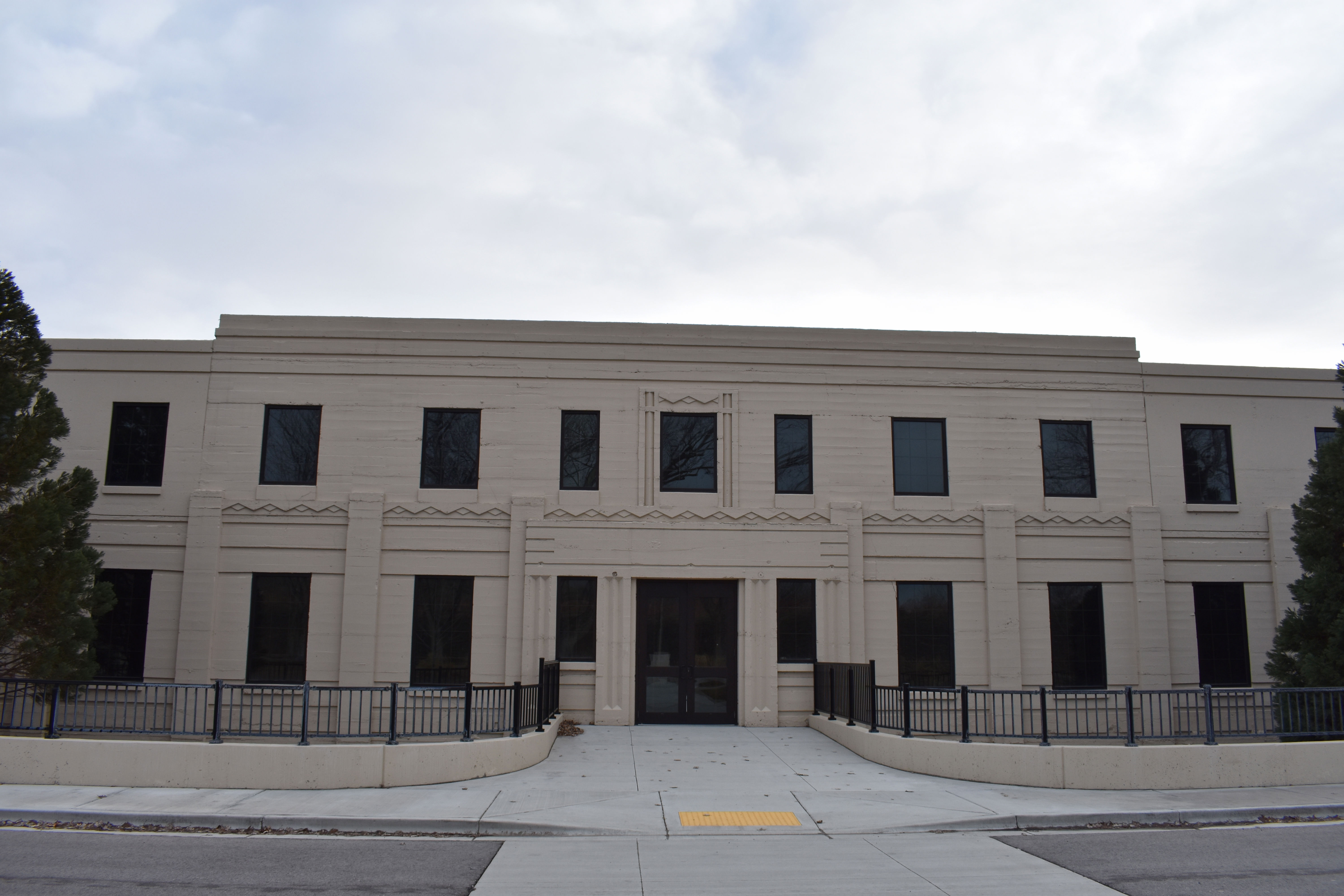
- Idaho National Guard Armory in 2019

- Location within Idaho Location within the United States
- Location: 801 Reserve St., Boise, Idaho
- Coordinates: 43°36′51″N 116°11′02″W
- Area: less than one acre
- Built: 1931
- Built by: Jordan, J.O.
- Architect: Tourtelotte and Hummel
- Architectural style: Art Deco
- MPS: Tourtellotte and Hummel Architecture TR
- NRHP reference No.: 99000253
- Added to NRHP: February 26, 1999

The Idaho National Guard Armory in Boise, Idaho, is an unreinforced, poured concrete building designed by Tourtellotte & Hummel and constructed in three phases beginning with a 1-story section in 1931. The building includes a drill hall large enough for equestrian events and a 2-story office area completed in 1956. The facade is minimally decorated and features Art Deco elements, including a cornice of stepped concrete bands, projecting pilasters, and zigzag patterning.

== History ==
The armory replaced a wood-frame building at S 10th and W Borah St, acquired by the National Guard in 1921 in response to the National Defense Act of 1920. The former building was at the site of what is now Jack's Urban Meeting Place (JUMP).

In 1931 the first section of the armory was constructed by local contractor J.O. Jordan at 801 Reserve St in an area of Boise known as Krall's Third Addition. The building housed Troop E, 116th Cavalry, the 116th Engineers, and Battery B of the 148th Field Artillery. The building measured 62 feet by 182 feet, a large enough space for horses, trucks, tractors, and other equipment. In 1936 the second section of the armory was constructed, measuring 80 feet by 180 feet, large enough space to accommodate 1200 spectators. The facilities were improved in 1940. In 1956 the third and final component of the armory was constructed by K.H. Matthews. The section included 2-story wings for office space on either side of the main entry constructed in 1936.

By 1971 the building was no longer in use as a National Guard facility, and it was renovated and occupied by the Idaho Department of Public Assistance. The City of Boise later acquired the site, and it was sold to J & M Land, LLC, in 2012. It was then sold to Alpha Development in 2022, a Utah-based company, working in collaboration with Ball Ventures and duURBAN Communities. The building has remained vacant since 2012.

== See also ==
- Idaho Army National Guard
- National Register of Historic Places listings in Ada County, Idaho
