= Sweeny&Co Architects Inc. =

Canadian architectural firm

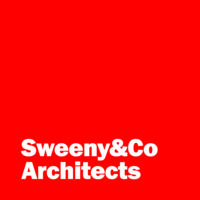
- Predecessor: Dermot Sweeny & Associates (1988 to 2005), Sweeny Sterling Finlayson & Co Architects Inc. (2005 to 2014)
- Founded: 1988
- Founder: Dermot Sweeny (Founding Principal, President)
- Headquarters: Toronto, Ontario, Canada
- Key people: Caroline Richard (Principal), John Gillanders (Principal)

Sweeny & Co. Architects Inc. is a Canadian architecture firm founded in 1988 by architect Dermot Sweeny. The firm is based in Toronto, Canada. Sweeny & Co. Architects specializes in commercial office towers, residential buildings, and mixed-use developments.

== History ==
Dermot Sweeny, an architect, founded the business in 1988. The firm's first project was The Derby, a residential building located at 393 King Street East in Toronto. The construction of The Derby constituted the city of Toronto's first re-zoning of industrial land to residential under Mayor Barbara Hall's new policy in the late 1990s.

The firm completed the Microsoft Canada Headquarters in 2002 and the Loblaw Companies Headquarters in 2005.

== Notable projects ==
=== Queen Richmond Center West (2015) ===
Completed in 2015, The Queen Richmond Centre West is a commercial building located at the intersection of Richmond Street West and Peter Street in Toronto, Ontario. The design notably preserved the existing adjacent brick buildings while adding a new 12-story office tower above it. This project has won more than 16 design awards, including the OAA Award for Design Excellence, RAIC National Urban Design Award for Urban Architecture, AIA's R+D Award, Canadian Green Building Awards, the Toronto Urban Design Award, and the ACO Paul Oberman Award for Adaptive Reuse.

=== Telus Harbour (2009) ===
Telus Harbour is a 30-story commercial glass tower located in downtown Toronto within the Financial District and was completed in October 2009. The development team for the project included managing partners Menkes Development Ltd., Alcion Ventures and HOOPP Realty Inc., with the collaboration of two architecture firms, Sweeny&Co Architects Inc. and Adamson Associates as lead architects. The Telus Harbour has achieved LEED Canada Platinum certification for Existing Buildings: Operations and Maintenance. Some of its sustainable features include advanced heating and cooling delivery through the raised floor, a deep-lake water cooling system, perimeter radiant panels, as well as built-in blinds. The design of the building aimed to ensure the wellness and comfort of its users by offering better access to natural light through the 11-foot floor-to-ceiling glass windows as well as individual workstations and airflow and temperature controls. The Telus Harbour received multiple awards including the DC Award Bronze, Toronto Urban Design Award, OAA Award Design Excellence, BOMA Earth Award Office Building, and more.

=== Waterfront Innovation Center (2021) ===
The Waterfront Innovation Centre is a project developed by Menkes Developments and commissioned by Waterfront Toronto. It was completed in August 2021. The building was built on 1.12 acres of land–around about 475,000 square feet of development space–and is designed to hold about 2,000 employees. It was awarded both the office development of the year and the office investment deal of the year for NAIPO 2021.

== Other projects ==
=== Completed Buildings ===
- One York and Harbour Plaza Residences (Toronto, 2017)
- Queen Richmond Centre West (Toronto, 2015)
- Red Stone Winery (Beamsville, 2015)
- RBC Centre (Toronto, 2009)
- Telus Harbour (Toronto, 2010)
- Microsoft Canada Headquarters (Mississauga, 2005)
- 180 Duncan Mill (Toronto, 2002)
- BMW Group Canada Headquarters (Richmond Hill)
- Loblaw Companies Ltd. Headquarters (Brampton)
- 11 Yorkville (Toronto)
- Portland Commons (Toronto)
- Waterfront Innovation Centre (Toronto)
- McLean Centre for Collaborative Discovery, McMaster University (Hamilton)
