= Adamson Associates =

Canadian architectural firm

Adamson Associates is a Toronto-based architectural firm founded in 1934. It also has affiliated offices in Vancouver, Los Angeles (Adamson Associates, Inc.), New York (AAI Architects, P.C.) and London (Adamson Associates [International] Limited).

Gordon Sinclair Adamson (1904-1986) started the firm in 1934 after working for a number of other architects (F. Hilton Wilkes and Edwin Kay), as well as noted Henry Sproatt and Ernest Ross Rolph. He worked briefly with Earle Morgan, but most of his practice was on his own or with associates. His practice was mainly residential, commercial, and industrial projects in Ontario. Adamson retired in 1971.

Since 1934 the firm has operated under several names, including G.S. Adamson, Adamson and Morgan (briefly, in the 1940s), then as Gordon S. Adamson & Associates. Today it is known as Adamson Associates.

The firm's main offices in Toronto are located at 401 Wellington Street West, formerly McGregor Socks factory.

== Projects ==
This is a partial list of works that Adamson Associates Architects and its affiliates have contributed to.

Project name	Location	Design Architect	Status
350 Park Avenue	New York, NY	Foster + Partners	In Progress
2 Finsbury Ave	London, UK	3XN	In Progress
2 World Trade Center	New York, NY	Foster + Partners	In Progress
Canary Wharf Estate	Canary Wharf, London, UK	Pelli Clarke Pelli, Troughton McAslan, Kohn Pedersen Fox, Studio U+A, Rogers Stirk Harbour + Partners, Foster + Partners	In Progress
Forma	Toronto, ON	Gehry Partners	In Progress
The Hub	Toronto, ON	Rogers Stirk Harbour + Partners	In Progress
London School of Economics Firoz Lalji Global Hub	London, UK	David Chipperfield Architects	In Progress
Oakridge Park	Vancouver, BC	Henriquez Partners Design Architect, Diamond Schmitt Architects AOR Residential, IBI Group AOR Interiors, Lissoni & Partners Design Interiors Suites, McFarlane Biggar AOR Interiors, Revery Architecture Designer Mall Interiors.	In Progress
One Beverly Hills	Los Angeles, CA	Foster + Partners, Kerry Hill Architects	In Progress
Wood Wharf Master Plan	Canary Wharf, London, UK	Allies and Morrison	In Progress
One Leadenhall Street	London, UK	Make Architects	Complete 2026
270 Park Avenue	New York, NY	Foster + Partners	Complete 2025
St. Lawrence Market North	Toronto, ON	Rogers Stirk Harbour + Partners	Complete 2025
St. John's Terminal	New York, NY	COOKFOX Architects	Complete 2024
50 Hudson Yards	New York, NY	Foster + Partners	Complete 2023
550 Madison Avenue Redevelopment	New York, NY	Snøhetta	Complete 2023
Battersea Power Station	London, UK	Gehry Partners	Complete 2023
Google Gradient Canopy	Mountain View, CA	Heatherwick Studio, BIG	Complete 2023
The Spiral	New York, NY	BIG	Complete 2023
425 Park Avenue	New York, NY	Foster + Partners	Complete 2022
Central Park Tower	New York, NY	Adrian Smith + Gordon Gill Architecture	Complete 2022
Google Bay View	Mountain View, CA	Heatherwick Studio, BIG	Complete 2022
One Park Drive	Canary Wharf, London, UK	Herzog & de Meuron	Complete 2022
CIBC Square	Toronto, ON	WilkinsonEyre	Complete 2021 (81 Bay Street); In Progress (141 Bay Street)
53W53	New York, NY	Ateliers Jean Nouvel	Complete 2021
Newfoundland Tower	Canary Wharf, London, UK	Horden Cherry Lee	Complete 2021
One Manhattan Square	New York, NY	AAI Architects, P.C.	Complete 2019
Bay Adelaide Centre East Tower and North Tower	Toronto, ON	KPMB Architects	Complete 2018 (East Tower); Complete 2022 (North Tower)
Jack's Urban Meeting Place	Boise, ID	Adamson Associates, Inc.	Complete 2018
151 North Franklin	Chicago, IL	John Ronan Architects	Complete 2018
3 World Trade Center	New York, NY	Rogers Stirk Harbour + Partners	Complete 2018
Salesforce Transit Center	San Francisco, CA	Pelli Clarke Pelli	Complete 2018
5 Manhattan West Renovation	New York, NY	REX	Complete 2017
John H. Daniels Faculty of Architecture, Landscape and Design	Toronto, ON	NADAAA	Complete 2017
Joseph Brant Hospital	Burlington, ON	Parkin Architects Limited and Adamson Associates Architects	Complete 2017
Providence Care	Kingston, ON	Parkin Architects Limited and Adamson Associates Architects	Complete 2017
Vaughan Metropolitan Centre Station	Toronto, ON	Arup Canada, Grimshaw Architects	Complete 2017
York University Station	Toronto, ON	Arup Canada, Foster + Partners	Complete 2017
Crossrail Place	Canary Wharf, London, UK	Foster + Partners	Complete 2015
Oakville Trafalgar Memorial Hospital	Oakville, ON	Parkin Architects Limited and Adamson Associates Architects	Complete 2015
20 Fenchurch Street	London, UK	Rafael Viñoly Architects	Complete 2014
National September 11 Memorial & Museum	New York, NY	Snøhetta	Complete 2014
51 Astor Place	New York, NY	Maki and Associates	Complete 2013
The News Building	London, UK	Renzo Piano Building Workshop	Complete 2013
UniCredit Headquarters/Porta Nuova Garibaldi	Milan, Italy	Pelli Clarke Pelli	Complete 2013
4 World Trade Center	New York, NY	Maki and Associates	Complete 2013
The Shard at London Bridge	London, UK	Renzo Piano Building Workshop	Complete 2013
Weston Family Learning Centre	Toronto, ON	Hariri Pontarini Architects	Complete 2011
200 West Street	New York, NY	Pei Cobb Freed & Partners	Complete 2010
Guggenheim Abu Dhabi (design development only)	Abu Dhabi, UAE	Gehry Partners	Complete 2010
Bank of America Tower (Manhattan)	New York, NY	COOKFOX Architects	Complete 2009
MGM CityCenter Block C	Las Vegas, NV	Studio Daniel Libeskind, Murphy/Jahn Architects, Kohn Pedersen Fox, Rockwell Group	Complete 2009
Stephen Sondheim Theatre	New York, NY	COOKFOX Architects	Complete 2009
The Shops at Crystals	Las Vegas, NV	Studio Daniel Libeskind	Complete 2009
Veer Towers	Las Vegas, NV	Murphy/Jahn Architects	Complete 2009
Waldorf Astoria Las Vegas	Las Vegas, NV	Kohn Pedersen Fox	Complete 2009
Telus House	Toronto, ON	Sweeny&Co Architects Inc. and Adamson Associate Architects	Complete 2009
Transformation AGO	Toronto, ON	Gehry Partners	Complete 2008
World Trade Center Master Plan	New York, NY	Studio Daniel Libeskind, Foster + Partners, Rogers Stirk Harbour + Partners, Maki and Associates	Complete 2008
Brampton Civic Hospital	Brampton, ON	Parkin Architects Limited and Adamson Associates Architects	Complete 2007
IAC Building	New York, NY	Gehry Partners	Complete 2007
Toronto Pearson International Airport New Terminal Development	Mississauga, ON	Airport Architects Canada (Skidmore, Owings & Merrill International Ltd., Moshe Safdie Associates Ltd., and Adamson Associates Architects)	Complete 2007
Hearst Tower	New York, NY	Foster + Partners	Complete 2006
MaRS Centre	Toronto, ON	Adamson Associates Architects	Complete 2005
30 Hudson Street	Jersey City, NJ	Pelli Clarke Pelli	Complete 2004
40 Bank Street	Canary Wharf, London, UK	Pelli Clarke Pelli	Complete 2003
International Finance Centre (Hong Kong) Cladding	Hong Kong, China	Pelli Clarke Pelli	Complete 1998 (Southwest Tower); 2003 (Northeast Tower)
25 Bank Street	Canary Wharf, London, UK	Pelli Clarke Pelli	Complete 2002
25 Canada Square	Canary Wharf, London, UK	Pelli Clarke Pelli	Complete 2002
Petronas Philharmonic Hall	Kuala Lumpur, Malaysia	Pelli Clarke Pelli	Complete 1998
The Petronas Towers	Kuala Lumpur, Malaysia	Pelli Clarke Pelli	Complete 1998
One Canada Square	Canary Wharf, London, UK	Pelli Clarke Pelli	Complete 1992
Canary Wharf DLR station	Canary Wharf, London, UK	Pelli Clarke Pelli	Complete 1991
Cabot Square	Canary Wharf, London, UK	Pelli Clarke Pelli	Complete 1990
World Financial Center and Winter Garden Atrium	New York, NY	Pelli Clarke Pelli	Complete 1988; Restored 2002
C. D. Howe Building	Ottawa, ON	Adamson Associates Architects	Complete 1978
