= The Hub (Toronto) =

Proposed skyscraper in Toronto

- Interactive map of the The Hub area

General information
- Status: Proposed
- Location: Toronto, Ontario, Canada, 30 Bay Street
- Coordinates: 43°38′32″N 79°22′41″W

Height
- Architectural: 311.8 metres (1,023 ft)

Technical details
- Floor count: 57
- Floor area: 1,453,077 square feet (134,995.3 m^{2})

Design and construction
- Architect: Adamson Associates (architect of record)
- Developer: Oxford Properties

Website
- thehub30bay.com

The Hub (stylized as The HUB) is a proposed supertall commercial skyscraper in the South Core of Toronto, Ontario, Canada. It is being developed by Oxford Properties, and designed by RSHP, while the executive architect is Adamson Associates. According to the Council on Tall Buildings and Urban Habitat, it will be 311.8 metres tall and have 57 above-ground floors. The building will have about 1.5 million square feet of floor area and Oxford Properties has begun pre-leasing the building as of October 2025.
