= Crossrail Place =

Structure in the West India Docks, Canary Wharf, London

Coordinates: 51.5061°N 0.0175°W

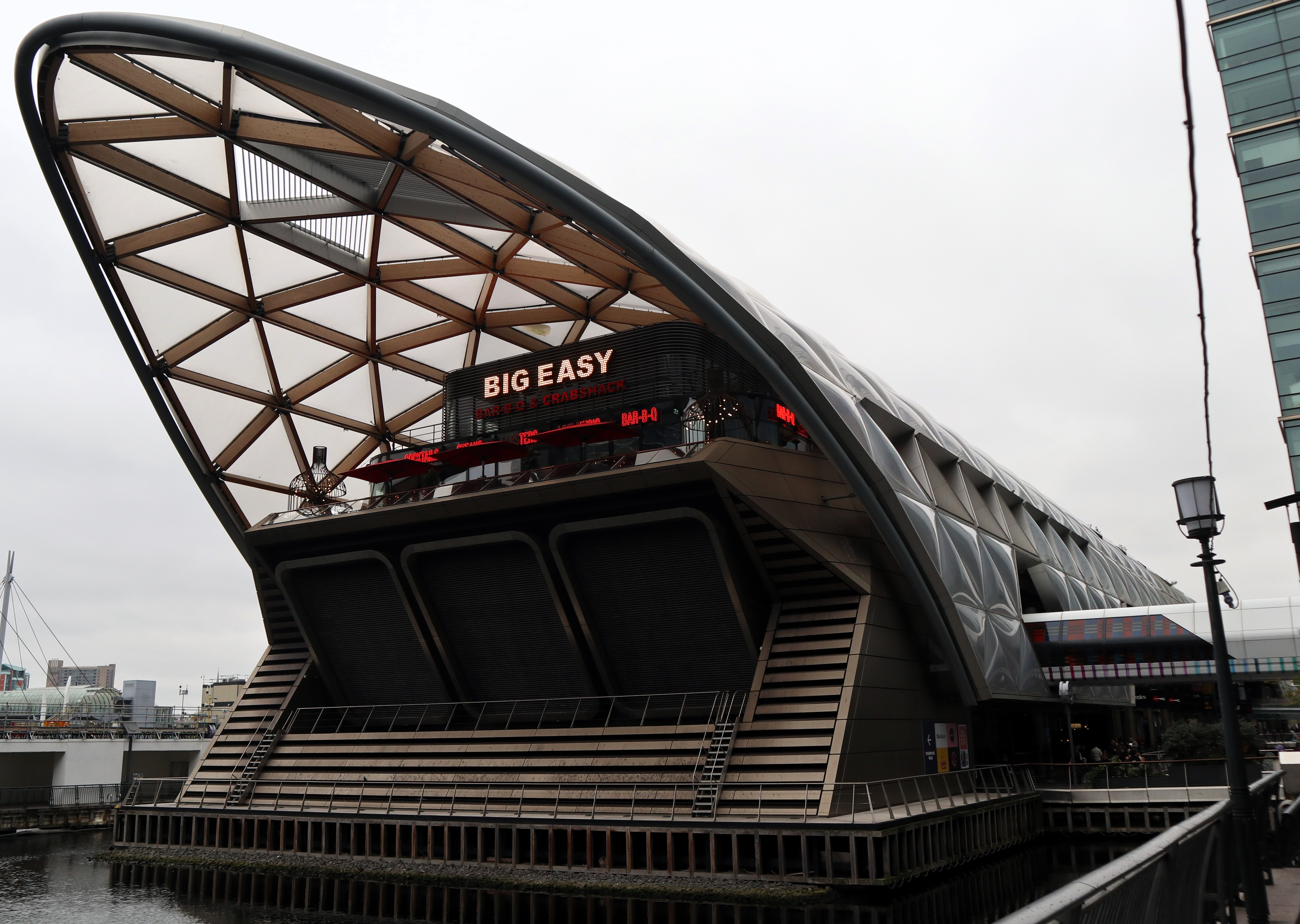
- Crossrail Place pictured in April 2024
- Interactive map of the Crossrail Place area

General information
- Type: Commercial
- Location: Canary Wharf, London, E14; United Kingdom
- Completed: 2015; 11 years ago
- Owner: Canary Wharf Group; Transport for London (station only)

Design and construction
- Architects: Foster and Partners, Adamson Associates Architects (as executive architect)

Crossrail Place is a complex built in the North Dock of the West India Docks in London's Canary Wharf, as part of the railway project Crossrail. It contains Canary Wharf railway station and was partly opened on 1 May 2015. Architect Magazine described Crossrail Place as an "enormous, ship-like building", and its roof is the largest timber project in the United Kingdom. It was designed by Foster + Partners and Arup. It rises from the Import Dock (North Dock) of West India Docks.

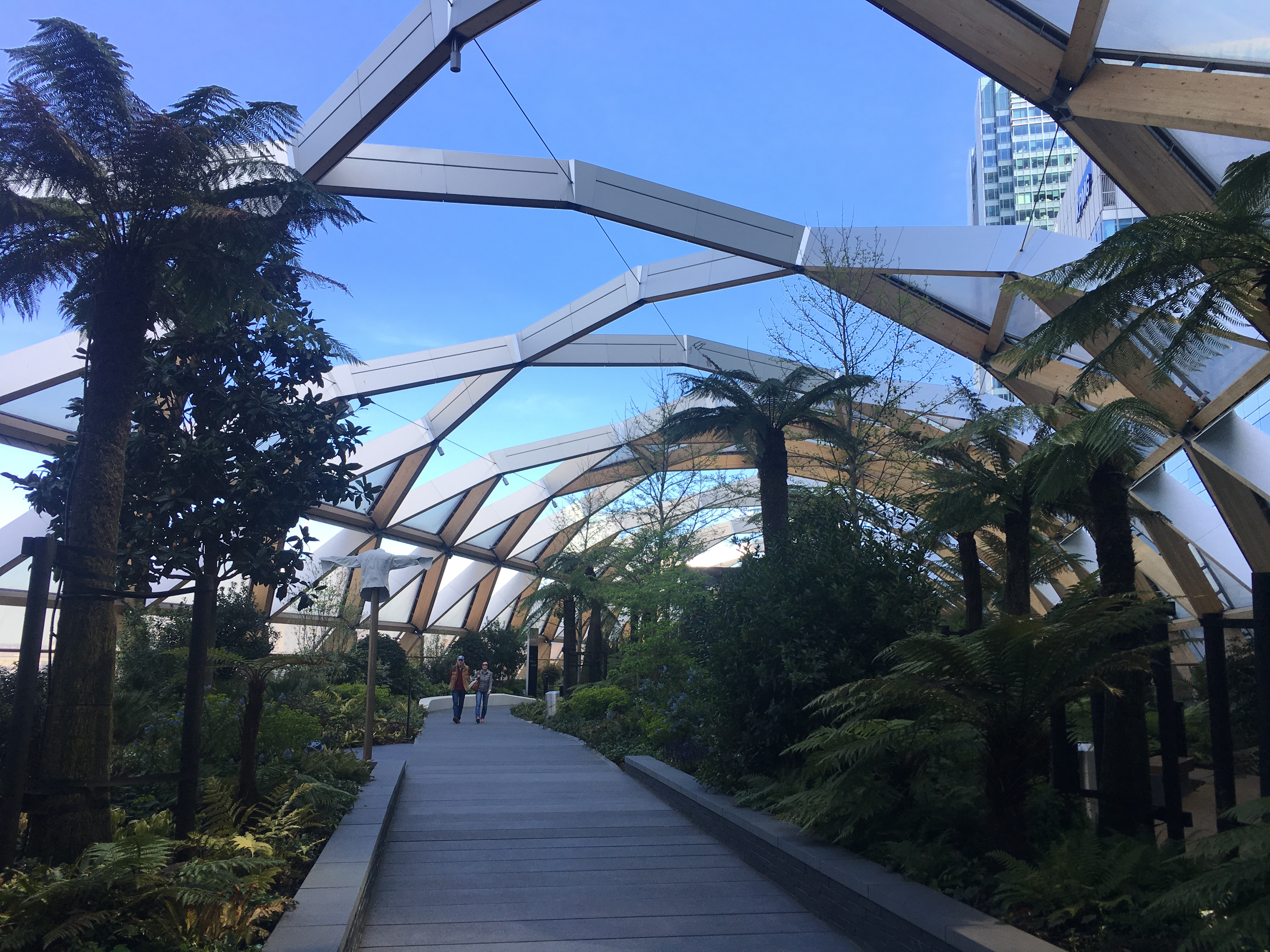
The roof garden

The complex has shops and a cinema, as well as a roof garden, which is open to the public. The garden includes specimens from the Eastern and Western hemispheres, organized in reference to a meridian line.

== Awards and accreditations ==
The design and development of Crossrail Place won several international and United Kingdom awards. Selected notable awards include:

- “Best Urban Regeneration Project” at 2016 MIPIM awards in France,
- the first prize for the best “Innovative Design of a Contemporary Garden” at the 2017 European Garden Awards in Berlin,
- Crossrail Place Roof Garden received a Highly Commended accolade at the 2016 Landscape Institute Awards in the category “Design for a Small-Scale Development”,
- “Transport and Infrastructure” award at the 2016 New London Awards,
- “London Infrastructure civil engineering award” by Institution of Civil Engineers in 2014.
