= Terry Dintenfass =

American art dealer

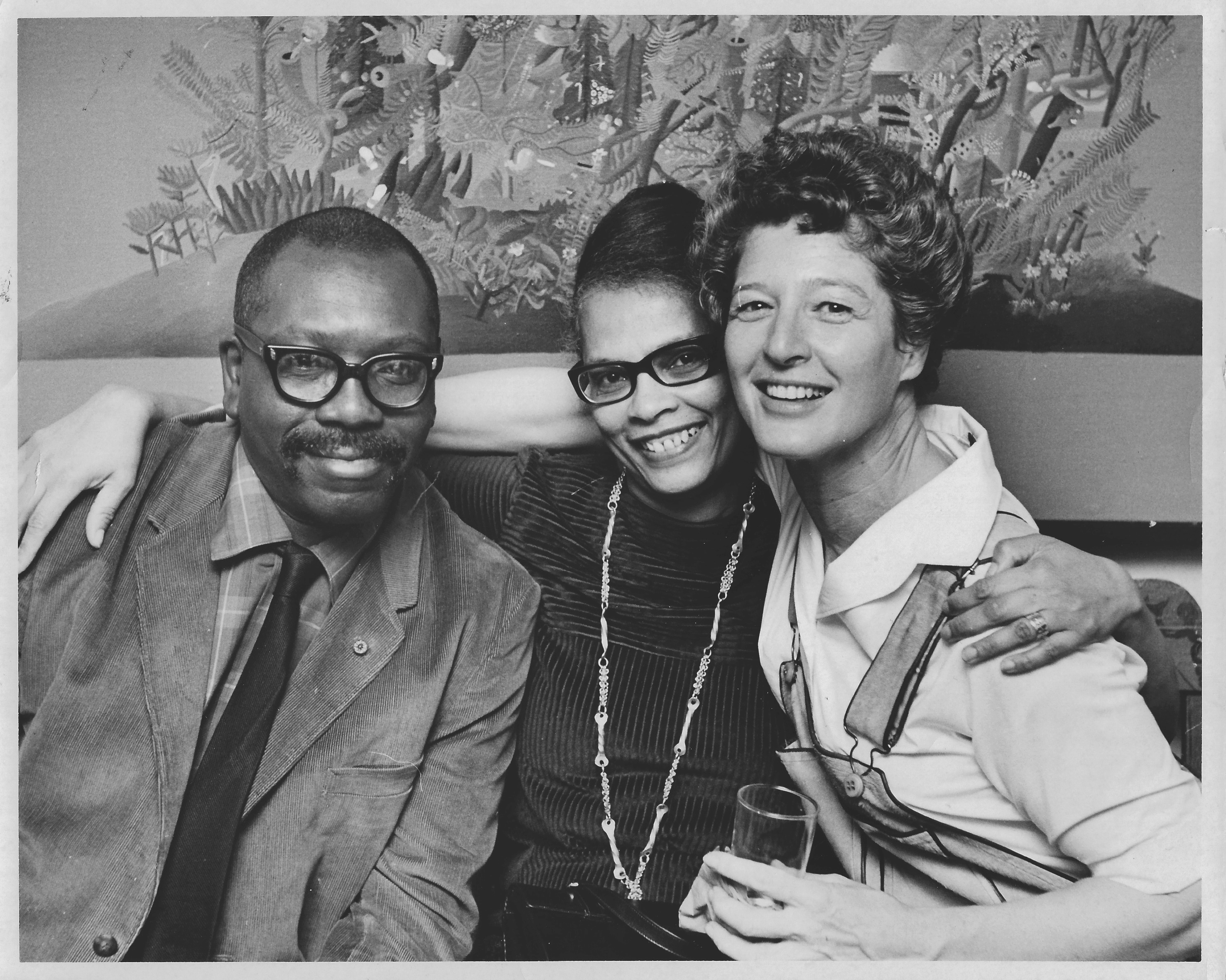
- Terry (right) with Jacob Lawrence (left) & Gwendolyn Knight (center) circa 1970
- Born: Theresa Schellenberg Kline; April 4, 1920; Atlantic City, NJ
- Died: October 26, 2004 (aged 84); New York, NY
- Movement: American Modernism; Social Realism

Terry Dintenfass (April 4, 1920 – October 26, 2004) was an American art dealer.

== Career ==
Terry Dintenfass established her first gallery, the D Contemporary, in 1954 in the lobby of the Traymore Hotel in Atlantic City, New Jersey, where she sold the work of Milton Avery, Georgia O'Keeffe, Ben Shahn, John Marin, Max Weber, among others. She showed work on consignment from prominent New York dealers, and became especially close to Edith Halpert, whose Downtown Gallery represented the estate of Arthur Dove. In 1959, Dintenfass moved to Manhattan and opened the Terry Dintenfass Gallery. She was part of a wave of women dealers, along with Halpert, Grace Borgenicht, Betty Parsons, Antoinette M. Kraushaar, Joan Washburn and others, who worked the New York art market between the 1940s to the 1980s.

Dintenfass took a keen interest in social and political issues. She showed the works of African-American artists including Jacob Lawrence, whom she would represent for 25 years, Raymond Saunders, and Horace Pippin. Dintenfass notably represented African-American artists in a time when Manhattan galleries displayed little African-American art. The "Social Realist" painters Philip Evergood and Robert Gwathmey helped shape the gallery with a strong social consciousness. Once settled in New York, Dintenfass became the protégé of Edith Halpert. When Halpert retired in the early 1960s, the Arthur Dove estate joined Terry Dintenfass, Inc. which then had a stable of William King, Gwathmey, Evergood, Sidney Goodman, Hyman Bloom, Antonio Frasconi, among others, and later the sculptor Elisabeth Frink.

The gallery represented these artists for much of the last three to four decades and is now involved in their secondary market. The gallery continues to represent the estate of Arthur Dove. After maintaining a gallery in Manhattan for nearly 40 years, Dintenfass retired in 1999 and died in 2004. Her business is currently run by her son Andrew and his wife Ann.

Dintenfass' only full sibling was psychopharmacologist and two-time Lasker Award winner Nathan Schellenberg Kline.
