= Sidney Goodman =

American artist

- Born: January 19, 1936; South Philadelphia, United States
- Died: April 11, 2013 (aged 77); Philadelphia, Pennsylvania
- Education: Philadelphia College of Art, 1958
- Known for: Painting, Drawing
- Movement: American realism
- Spouses: Eileen T. Goodman; Pamela McCabe

Sidney Goodman (January 19, 1936 – April 11, 2013) was an American figurative painter and draftsman from Philadelphia, PA who explored the human form. Goodman received public notice in the early 1960s for his oil paintings, leading to his inclusion in the 1973 Whitney Biennial. In 1996, the Philadelphia Museum of Art presented a retrospective show of Goodman's paintings and drawings.

== Biography ==
Sidney Goodman was born in South Philadelphia in 1936, the son of Russian Jewish immigrant parents who came to America in the 1920s. His father was a furrier and his mother was an actress in the Yiddish theatre.

In 1954, Goodman enrolled in the Philadelphia College of Art, (now University of the Arts) graduating in 1958. Goodman entered the Army, serving from 1958-59.

In 1961, his debut exhibition in New York City at the Terry Dintenfass Gallery received high praise. At the age of 27, Time magazine described Goodman as "one of the most respected and sought-after of the new figure painters." He received critical attention for his New York debut exhibition and was awarded the Whitney Museum of American Art Neysa McMein Purchase Award.

He began teaching at the Philadelphia College of Art starting in 1960. He would teach there until the spring of 1978, when he joined the faculty of the Pennsylvania Academy of the Fine Arts. Goodman taught at the Pennsylvania Academy of the Fine Arts until 2011, when he retired.

Goodman received a Guggenheim Fellowship in 1964. He was selected to be part of the 1973 Whitney Biennial. The Museum of Art at the Pennsylvania State University organized a major show that traveled in 1980-81. From 1978 to 2011, Goodman taught at the Pennsylvania Academy of the Fine Arts. Goodman had nineteen one-person shows at the Terry Dintenfass Gallery between 1961 and 1996. In 1996, the Philadelphia Museum of Art presented a retrospective of Goodman's paintings and drawings. From 1960 to 1978, he was married to the artist Eileen Goodman, with whom he had one child, Amanda, in 1965. In 1980 Goodman married the artist and lifelong model/muse, Pamela McCabe. They had two children, Luke in 1986 and Maia in 1989.

In 1986, Goodman received the Hazlette Memorial Award for Excellence in the Arts (Painting). In 2006, he received an honorary doctorate from Lyme Academy College of Fine Arts.

== Artistic practice ==
Goodman, using oil paint, pastel, charcoal, pencil, pen and ink, forged a style through direct observation, creative imagination, and prolonged study of European and American masters, employing a figurative and allegorical approach lodged in modern urban and suburban subject matter. He often renders his subjects with moody or ominous lighting. Goodman said of light:

Light has its own power and mystery. Things that I am attracted to come by light—the way things are formed by the use of light.

Goodman's work is noted as exemplary of a renewal of figurative realism in 1960s. In The New York Times, Brian O'Doherty reviews his show, describing his imagery as "a modern apocalypse influenced by Freud and Gray's Anatomy." Critics noted Goodman's examination of "expressive distortions of the human form, and connected him to the work of postwar figurative artists such as Francis Bacon.

Art historian and curator Anne d'Harnoncourt describes Goodman's work as encompassing "both his fascination with capturing the characteristic shapes, features, and gestures of humanity (whether drawn from his family and friends or from newspaper snapshots) and his drive to incorporate them into disturbing compositions that convey complex, even contradictory meanings." From 1963 on, Goodman used a polaroid camera as a visual sketchbook, his studio full of photos he took and other references that inspired him.

From the mid 1960s until the late 1970s he was particularly concerned with what he calls "the violated landscape'—inanimate structures (water tanks, gas tanks, dumpsters, stadiums, incinerators, out of scale buildings) that threaten the harmony of nature." Goodman noted: "I sometimes paint a realistic picture in order to justify logically something unreal."

Goodman featured his family and himself as the primary subject of his many portraits. He found inspiration in the work of Goya and Velázquez.

In 1996, he said that shows and reviews always were secondary to what was happening daily in his studio.

If the painting is going well, that's the main thing. If it's not going well, then all the other stuff isn't going to help. I felt that way back in the '60s, and I feel that way today.

== Awards and appointments ==
- 1957 Yale-Norfolk Fellowship
- 1958 Philadelphia College of Art, Gimbel Prize in Painting
- 1961 Whitney Museum of American Art, Neysa McMein Purchase Award
- 1962 Ford Foundation Purchase
- 1964 Guggenheim Fellowship
- 1971 National Academy of Design, New York
- 1971 Philadelphia College of Art (The Alumni Award)
- 1974 National Endowment for the Arts Fellowship
- 1985 Skowhegan School of Painting and Sculpture, Skowhegan, ME
- 1987 University of California, Davis (Visiting Professor)
- 1991 University of Georgia, Athens, GA (Lamar Dodd Professorial Chair)
- 1996 Art Institute of Boston (Honorary Degree)
- 1999 Vermont Studio Center (Visiting Professor)

== Selected exhibition history ==
- 1961 - 1996 Nineteen Solo Shows - Terry Dintenfass Gallery - New York, NY
- 1962 - Whitney Museum of American Art, Annual Exhibition
- 1963 - Whitney Museum of American Art, Annual Exhibition
- 1968 - Pennsylvania Academy of the Fine Arts
- 1969 - Dimock Gallery, George Washington University, Washington, D.C.
- 1970 - Philadelphia College of Art
- 1975 - Pennsylvania Academy of the Fine Arts
- 1979 - Andrews Gallery, College of William & Mary Williamsburg, VA
- 1980 - Sidney Goodman: Paintings, Drawings, and Graphics 1959-1979 Museum of Art, Pennsylvania State University (Palmer Museum of Art), Columbus Museum of Art, Queens Museum, Delaware Art Museum
- 1981 - The Arkansas Arts Center, Little Rock, AR
- 1981 - Sidney Goodman Recent Work, Institute for Contemporary Art, Richmond, VA, Boston University Art Gallery
- 1984 - Sidney Goodman Recent Work, Wichita Art Museum
- 1985 - Philadelphia Museum of Art, Pertaining to Philadelphia, Part V: Sidney Goodman
- 1987 - Swarthmore College, Swarthmore, PA - Sidney Goodman: Drawings 1975-1985
- 1991 - Institute of Contemporary Art, Philadelphia
- 1991 - Georgia Museum of Art, Athens, GA
- 1994 - Kitakyushu Municipal Museum of Art, New York Realism, Past and Present
- 1996 - Philadelphia Museum of Art, Retrospective
- 1999 - Eli Marsh Gallery, Amherst College, Amherst, MA
- 2000, 2003, 2005 - ACA Gallery, New York
- 2007 - Samuelis Baumgarte Galerie, Essen, Germany
- 2007 - Seraphin Gallery, Philadelphia, PA
- 2008 - Rose Art Museum, Brandeis University
- 2009 - Philadelphia Academy of Fine Arts - Sidney Goodman: Man in the Mirror

== Permanent collections ==
Selected Permanent Collections

- Arkansas Art Center, Little Rock, AR
- Art Institute of Chicago, Chicago, IL
- Brooklyn Museum, Brooklyn, NY
- Butler Institute of American Art, Youngstown, OH
- Hirshhorn Museum (Smithsonian American Art Museu)) Washington, D.C.
- Metropolitan Museum of Art, New York, NY
- Museum of Modern Art, New York, NY
- National Gallery of Art, Washington, D.C.
- Palmer Museum of Art, Penn State University, PA
- Pennsylvania Academy of Fine Art, Philadelphia, PA
- Philadelphia Museum of Art, Philadelphia, PA
- Rose Art Museum, Brandeis University, Waltham, MA
- Whitney Museum of American Art, New York, NY
