= 1 Leadenhall Street =

One Leadenhall Street
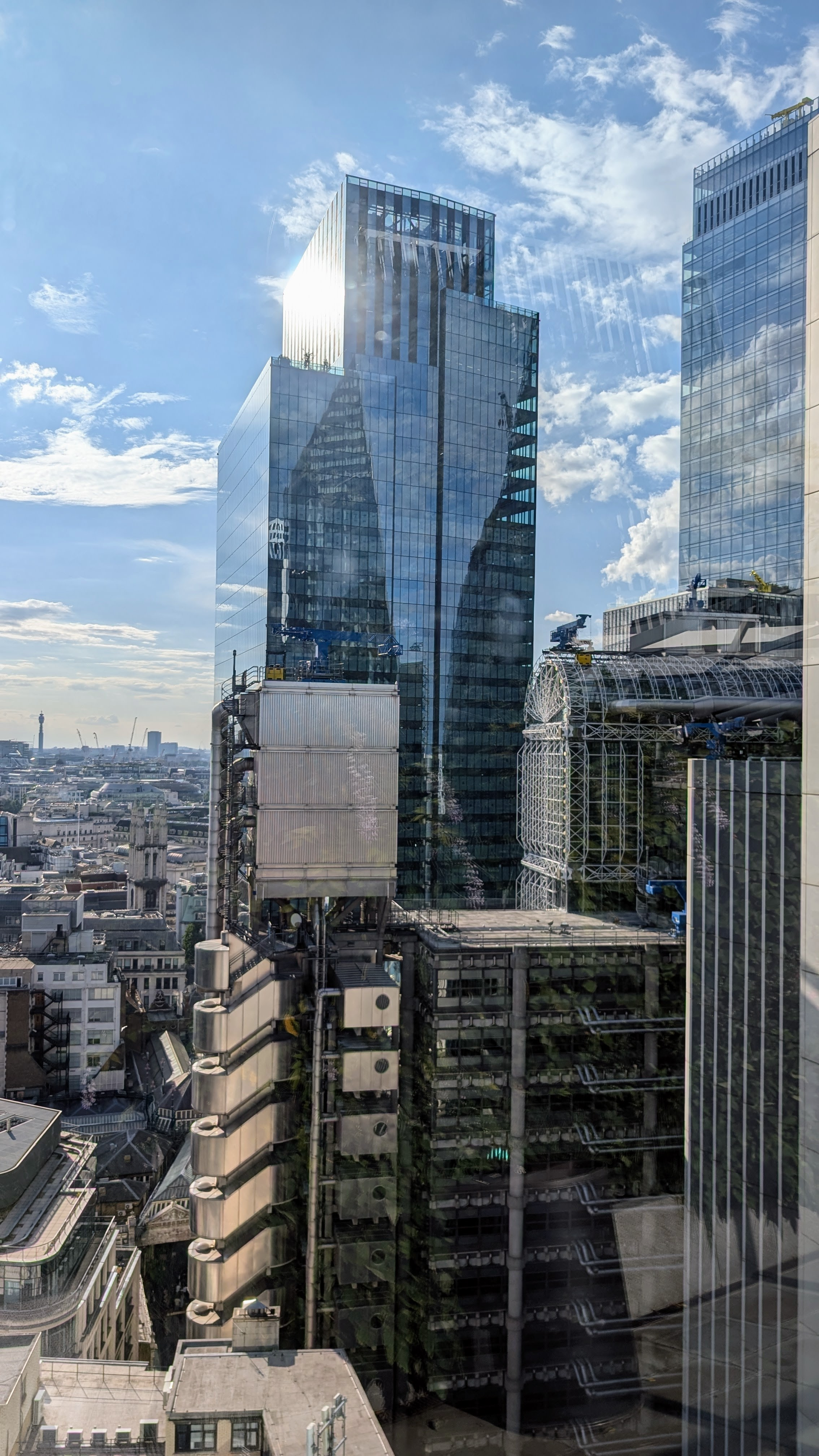
- 1 Leadenhall Street behind the Lloyd's Building, July 2025
- Interactive map of the One Leadenhall Street area

General information
- Status: Completed
- Location: London, EC3; United Kingdom
- Coordinates: 51.5132°N 0.0838°W
- Completed: 2024
- Client: Brookfield Property Partners

Height
- Roof: 158m

Technical details
- Floor count: 36
- Floor area: 63,273 square metres (681,065 ft^{2})

Design and construction
- Architects: Make Architects; Adamson Associates (International) Limited (as executive architect)
- Structural engineer: Robert Bird Group

Website
- www.makearchitects.com/projects/1-leadenhall-street/

One Leadenhall is a 36-storey, 158 metre skyscraper, adjacent to Leadenhall Market at the west end of Leadenhall Street in London. It replaced the previous building, Leadenhall Court, and was completed in 2024.

== Development ==
=== Planning ===
A planning application was submitted to the Corporation of London in August 2016. The description included with the application is as follows:

Demolition of the existing building and redevelopment to provide a 36 storey building with 28 floors for office use (Class B1) with retail floorspace (Class A1-A4), office lobby and loading bay at ground floor, 2 levels of retail floorspace (flexible Class A1-A4) at first and second floors, a publicly accessible terrace and winter garden (sui generis) at second floor, 5 floors of plant and ancillary basement cycle parking, cycle facilities and plant (63,273sq.m GIA). Leadenhall Court 1 Leadenhall Street London EC3V 1AB

The planning application was approved in January 2017.

=== Construction ===
Construction started in January 2021, and architecturally topped out in April 2024, The building was handed over to the client, in the first quarter of 2025. The public terrace opened in May 2026.

== Gallery ==
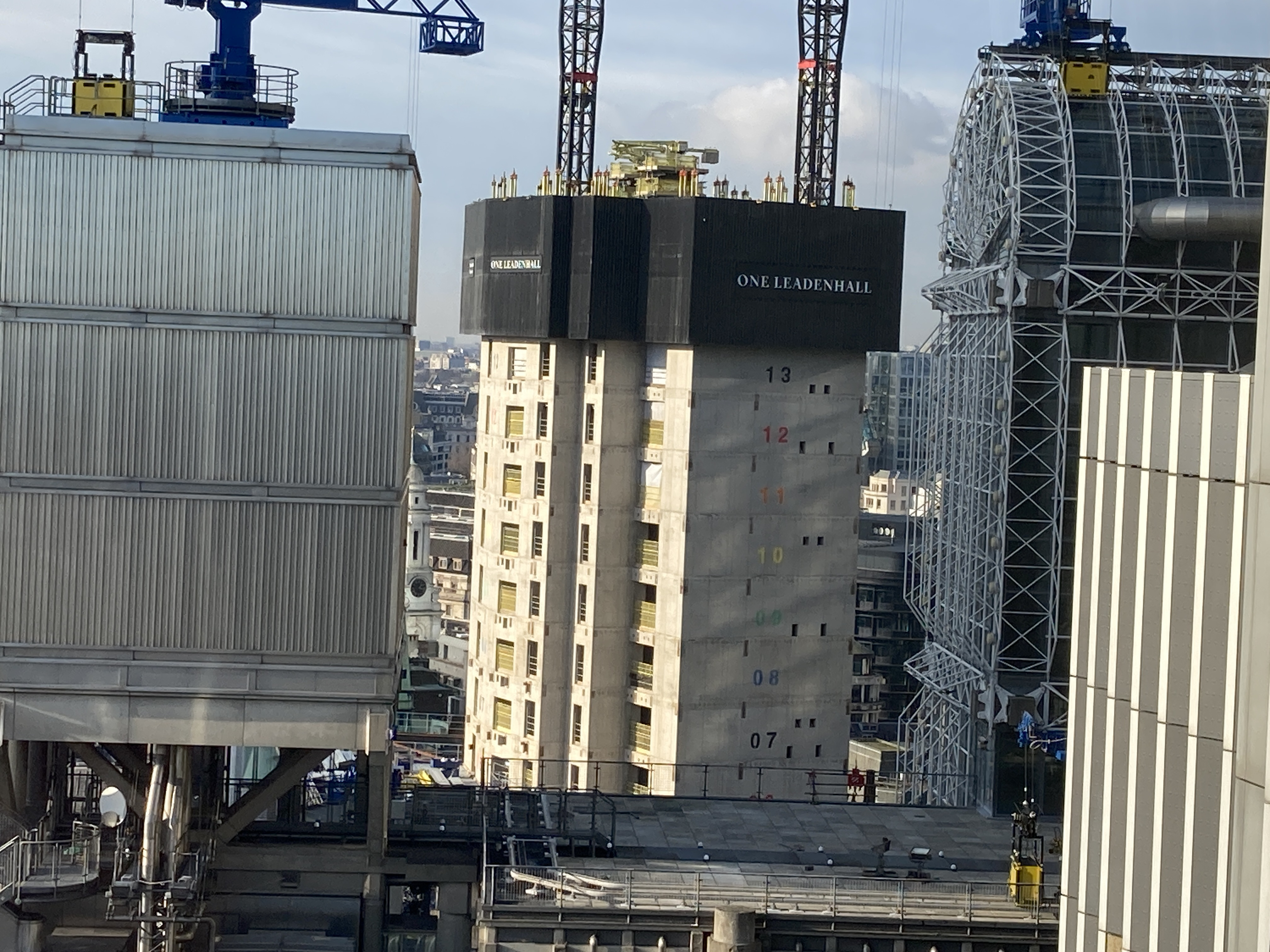
January 2023

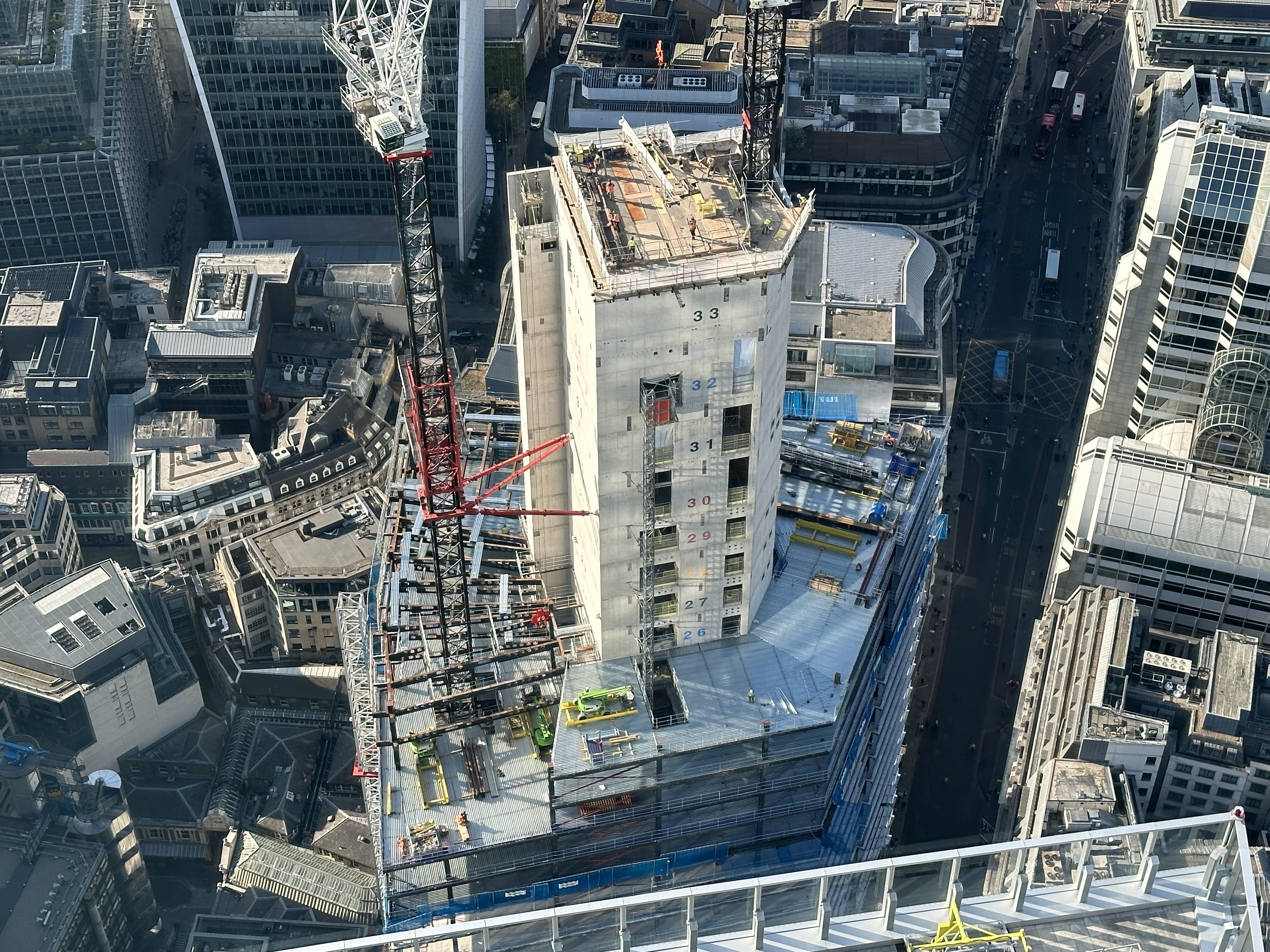
From 22 Bishopsgate in September 2023

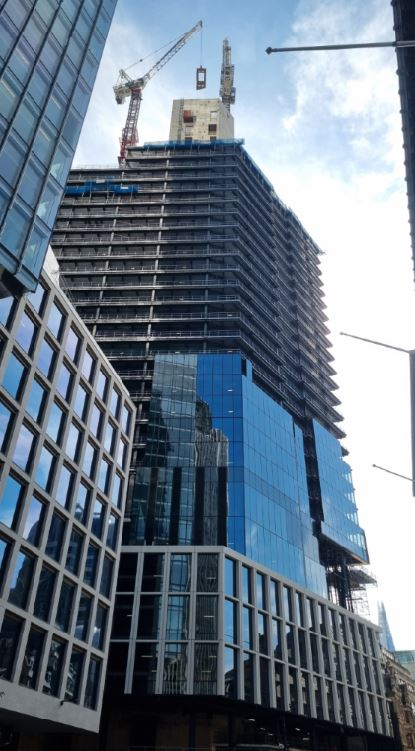
Construction in September 2023

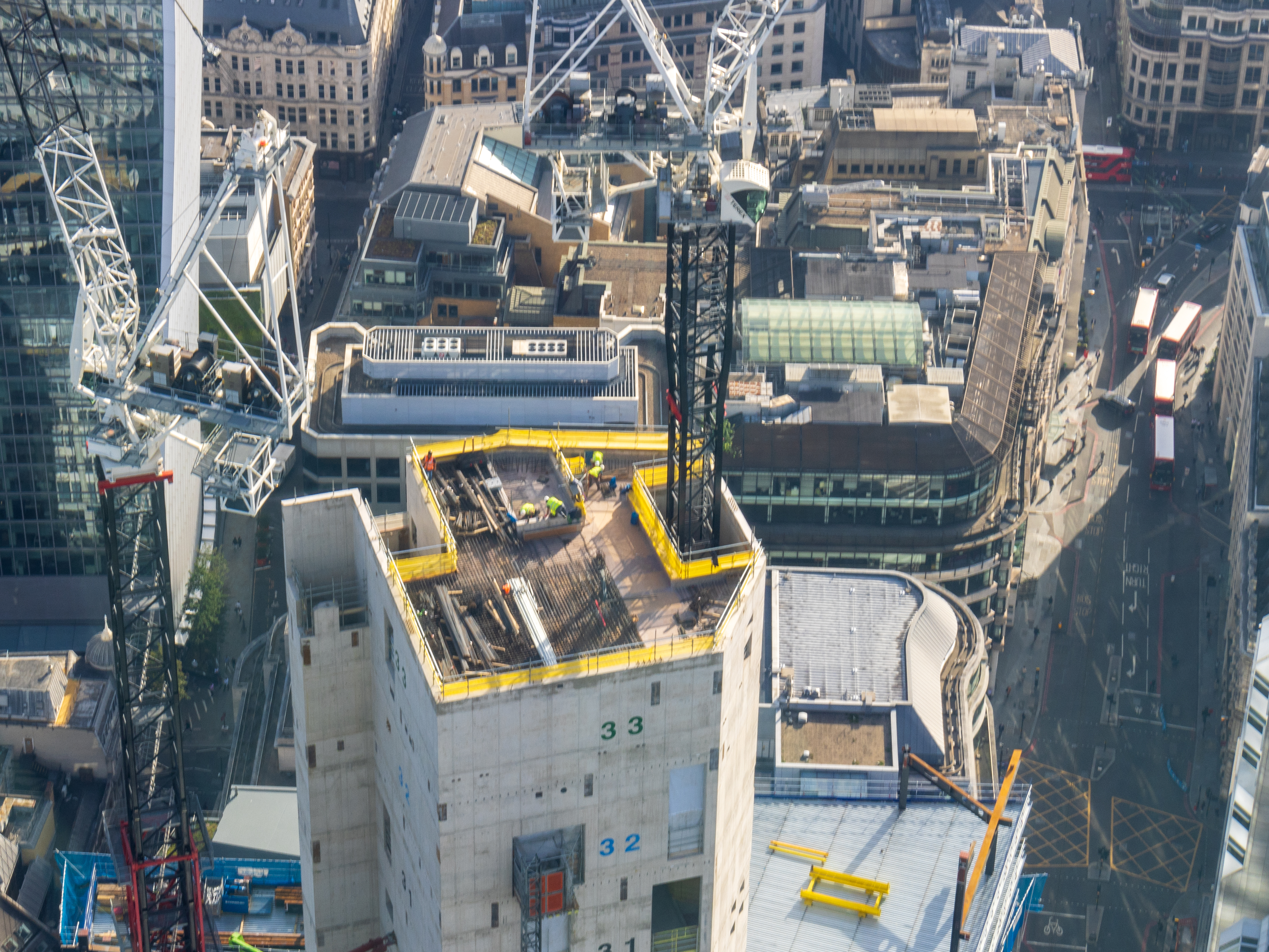
Construction in October 2023

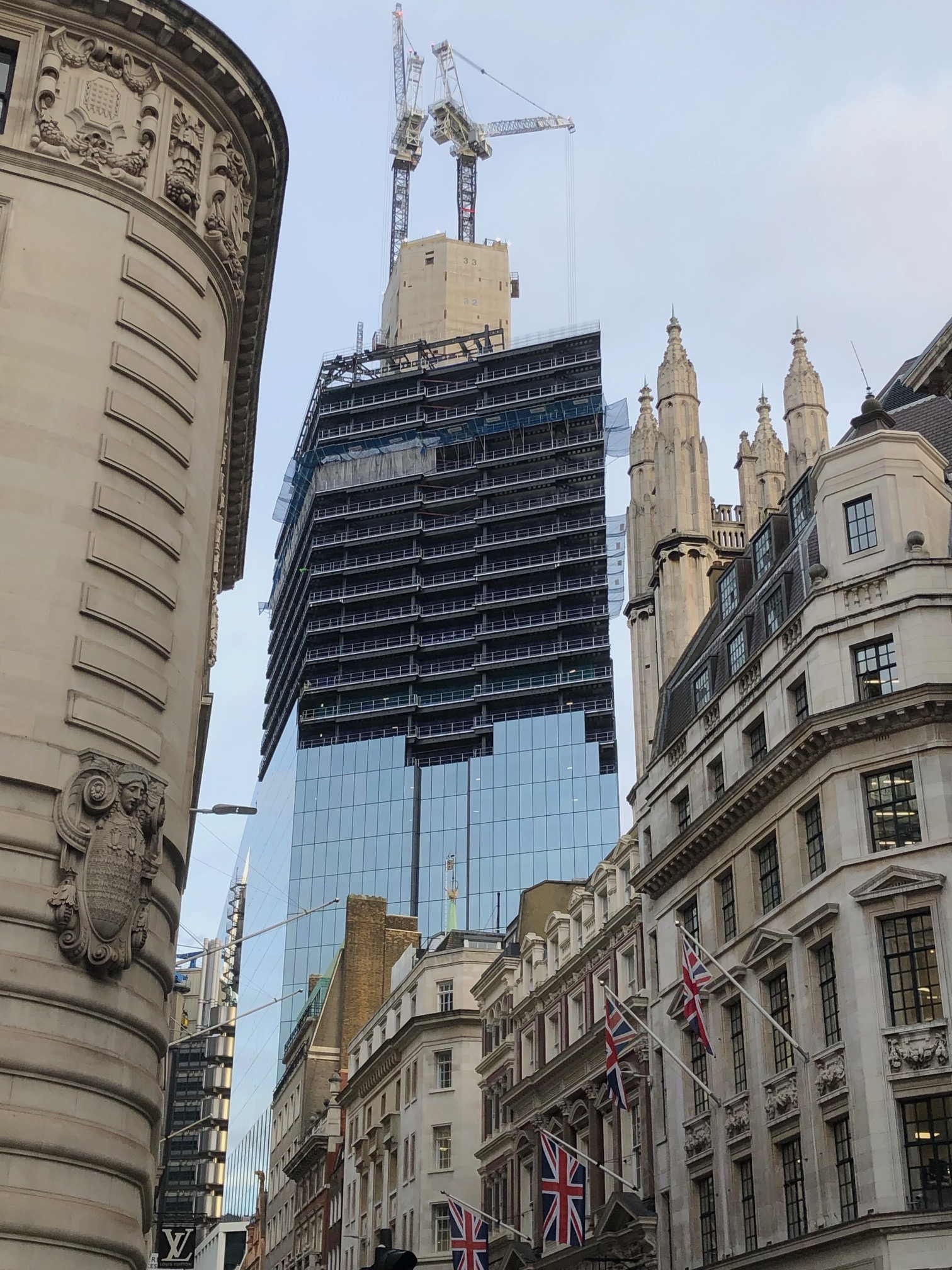
November 2023

== Tenants ==
Floor	Tenant(s)
32	Latham & Watkins
29	Ripple
28	Ripple
27	Ripple
26	Ripple
25	Ripple
24	Ripple
23	the Work Project
22	the Work Project
21	Latham & Watkins
20	Latham & Watkins
19	Latham & Watkins
18	Latham & Watkins
17	Latham & Watkins
16	Latham & Watkins
15	Latham & Watkins
14	Latham & Watkins
13	Latham & Watkins
12	Latham & Watkins
11	Latham & Watkins
10	Latham & Watkins
9	Latham & Watkins
8	Latham & Watkins
7	Latham & Watkins
6	Latham & Watkins
G
