= Gem County Courthouse =

- U.S. National Register of Historic Places
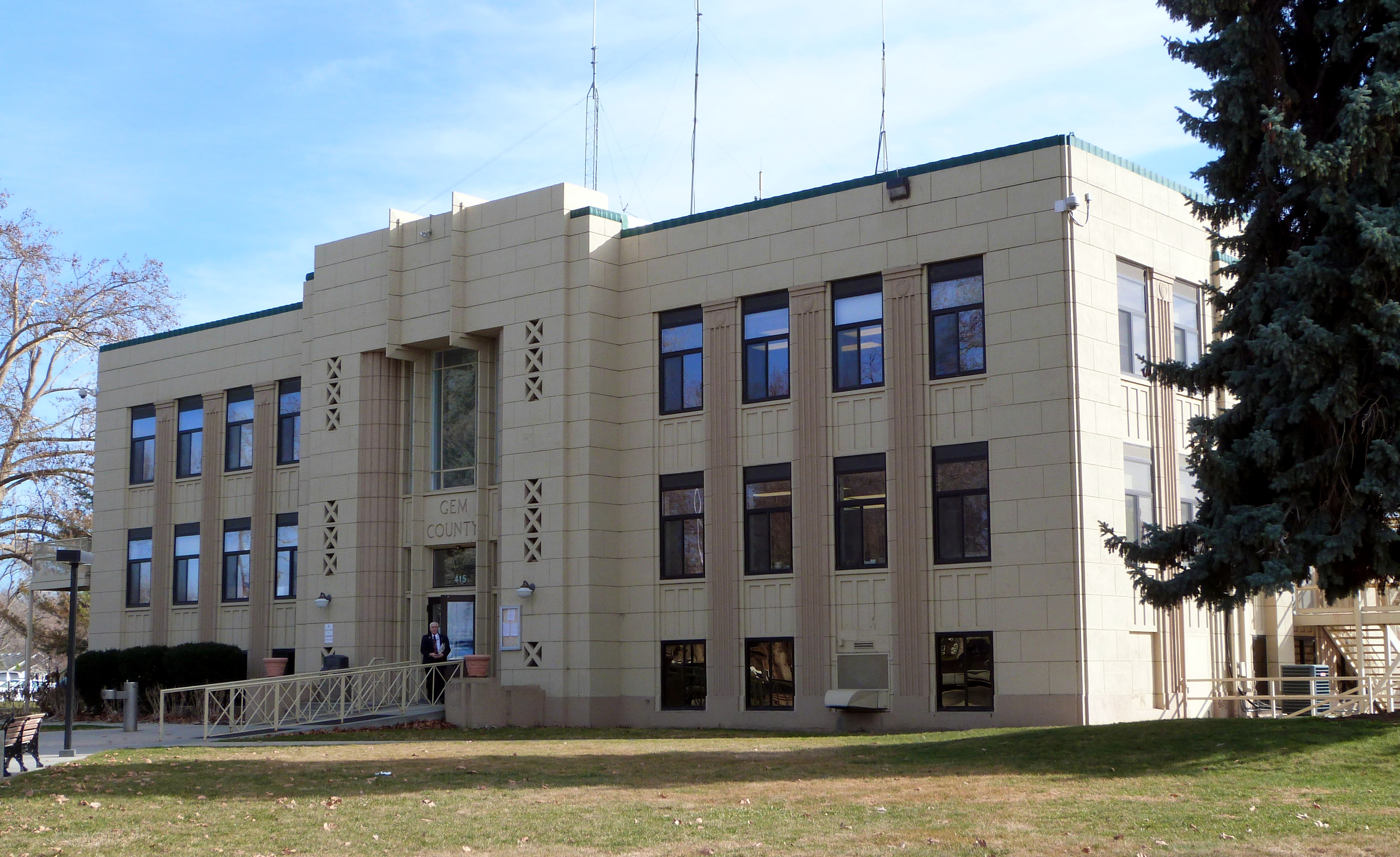

- Location within Idaho Location within the United States
- Interactive map showing the location of Gem County Courthouse
- Location: Main St. and McKinley Ave., Emmett, Idaho
- Coordinates: 43°52′31″N 116°29′42″W
- Area: less than one acre
- Built: 1938
- Built by: Richardson, David
- Architect: Hummel, Frank
- Architectural style: Modern Movement, Art Deco
- MPS: Tourtellotte and Hummel Architecture TR
- NRHP reference No.: 82000347
- Added to NRHP: November 17, 1982

The Gem County Courthouse, located at the intersection of Main St. and McKinley Ave. in Emmett, serves Gem County, Idaho. The courthouse was built in 1938 to give the small county a government building, as it had been without one since the previous courthouse burned in 1920. Architect Frank Hummel of Tourtellotte and Hummel designed the Art Deco building. The two-and-one-half-story concrete building features a projecting three-story entrance with fluted columns and cross vents on either side of the doorway. Each side of the front facade features four sets of windows separated by fluted pilasters.

The courthouse was added to the National Register of Historic Places on November 17, 1982.
