= Rosalie Gwathmey =

American painter and photographer (1908–2001)

- Gwathmey shares her work at a Photo League meeting, 1947
- Born: Rosalie Hook; September 15, 1908; Charlotte, North Carolina, US
- Died: February 12, 2001 (aged 92); Amagansett, New York, US
- Known for: Photography, Textile design
- Spouse: Robert Gwathmey (m. 1935–1988) his death

Rosalie Gwathmey (nee Hook, September 15, 1908 – February 12, 2001) was an American painter and photographer known for her photos of black southern communities around her hometown of Charlotte, North Carolina.

== Life and work ==
Gwathmey was born in Charlotte, North Carolina. She was the daughter of successful architect, Charles C. Hook, and Ida MacDonald Hook. Rosalie married painter, Robert Gwathmey in 1935. She gave birth to their son, Charles Gwathmey, in 1938.

Rosalie studied painting at the Pennsylvania Academy of the Fine Arts and Art Students League of New York. She joined the Photo League in 1942 where she studied photography and contributed to Photo Notes as a writer, reviewer and editor. After FBI investigations in the early 1950s, Gwathmey stopped photographing, destroyed her negatives, and donated many of her prints to the New York Public Library.

In the 1960s and 70s, she was a textile designer.

Her photography was known for capturing the lives of residents of Southern African American communities. She focused on black life in her home of Charlotte and Rocky Mount, North Carolina. She photographed many of the black sharecroppers and southern townscapes that became the basis of her husband's paintings. While Rosalie's social documentary photographs offer no stylistic revolution, her life and art reflect significant issues relating to politics and race relations in the United States during the 1940s. While in the Photo League, she worked with many radical photographers of the era: Paul Strand, Aaron Siskind, Sid Grossman, Dorothea Lange, Bernice Abbott, Lizette Modell, Walter Rosenblum, Dan Weiner, and Lou Stettner.

She died in 2001 at the age of 92.
