= Jack's Urban Meeting Place =

Creative activity center in Boise, Idaho

- JUMP
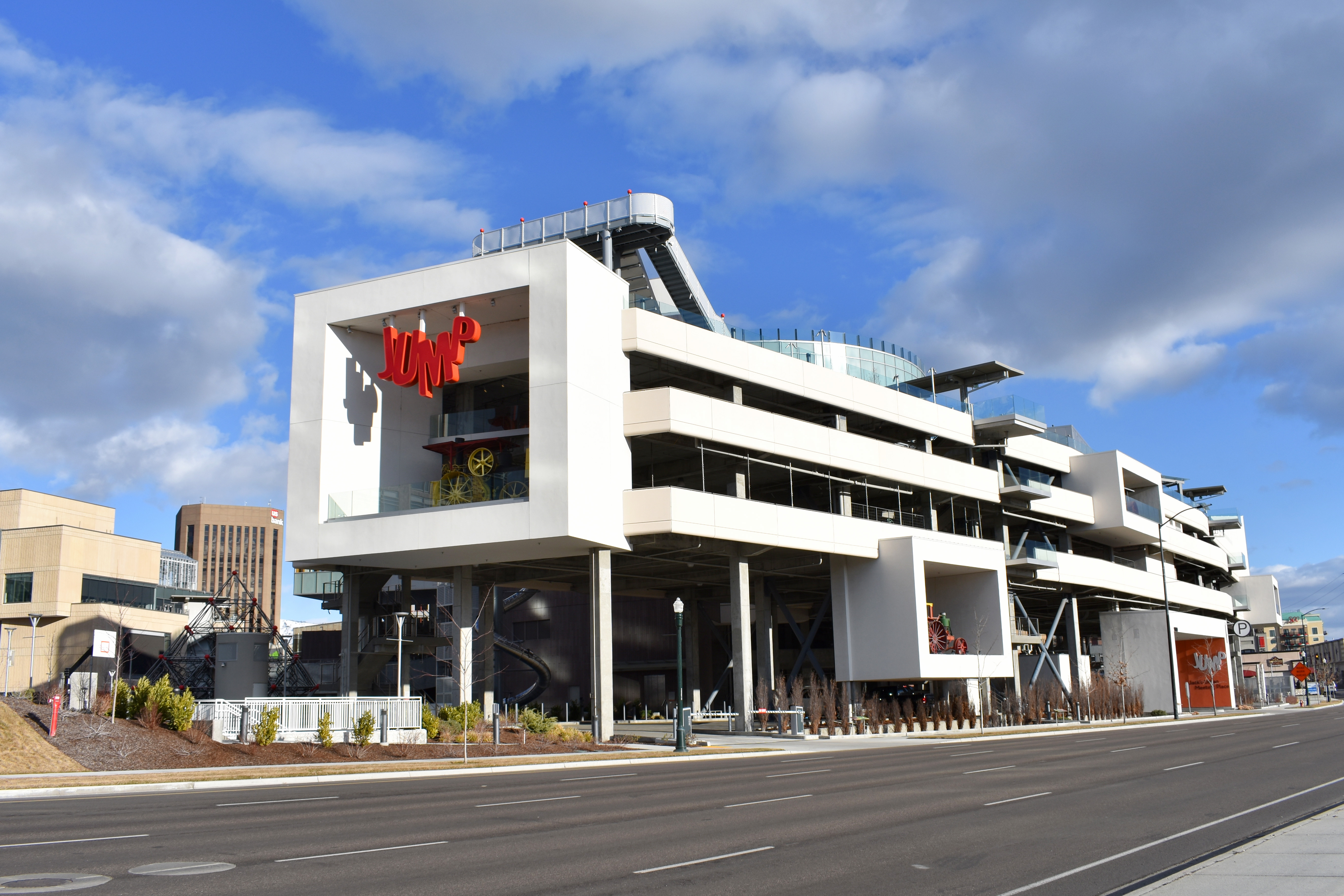
- JUMP in 2019

- Location within the United States Location within Idaho
- Address: 1000 W. Myrtle St.
- Location: Boise, Idaho, U.S.
- Coordinates: 43.6143°N 116.208°W
- Operator: J.R. Simplot Family Foundation
- Acreage: 7.5 acres (3.0 ha)

Construction
- Opened: December 15, 2015
- Cost: $70 million
- Architect: Adamson Associates, Inc.
- Builder: Hoffman Construction Company

Website
- jumpboise.org

Jack's Urban Meeting Place (JUMP) is a creative activity center in downtown Boise, Idaho, with facilities for public meetings, workshops, and exhibition space. An amphitheater and multi-purpose studios for art, physical activity, and cooking are included. A collection of 52 tractors are on display at various locations in the facility.

== History ==
Planning for JUMP began in 1999 as a museum of agriculture sponsored by Boise agribusiness magnate J. R. "Jack" Simplot. The museum was envisioned to include some of the 150 pieces of farm equipment Simplot had purchased in 1998 from the collection of Oscar O. Cooke. The plan evolved into a creative facility, and after Simplot's death in 2008, the J.R. Simplot Family Foundation proposed building a $100 million park and museum with studio space and meeting facilities. City planners rejected the idea as incompatible with development goals.

The foundation proposed a combined museum and new Boise Public Library, but again the plan was rejected. In 2012, city planners approved construction of a $70 million facility that included an urban park, a 57,000-square-foot (5,300 m^{2}) building, and the tractor exhibit. More than three years after groundbreaking, Jack's Urban Meeting Place opened in December 2015.

== Architecture ==
The architectural firm of Adamson Associates designed JUMP with five intersecting grid patterns, with components of a 6-story main building slightly skewed around a central ramp area in the parking garage. Hoffman Construction Company, the main contractor, encountered delays attributed to the design, perhaps the most complicated project in Boise construction history.

In 2018, JUMP received the best overall project award by the City of Boise and the Building Owners and Managers Association of Idaho.
