= Charles Gwathmey =

American architect

- Gwathmey in 2006
- Born: June 19, 1938; Charlotte, North Carolina, U.S.
- Died: August 3, 2009 (aged 71); New York City, U.S.
- Occupation: Architect
- Parent(s): Robert Gwathmey; Rosalie Gwathmey

Charles Gwathmey (June 19, 1938 – August 3, 2009) was an American architect. He was a principal at Gwathmey Siegel & Associates Architects, as well as one of the five architects identified as The New York Five in 1969. Gwathmey was perhaps best known for the 1992 renovation of Frank Lloyd Wright's Guggenheim Museum in New York City.

Born in Charlotte, North Carolina, he was the son of the American painter Robert Gwathmey and photographer Rosalie Gwathmey. He attended the High School of Music and Art in New York City, graduating in 1956. Charles Gwathmey attended the University of Pennsylvania and received his Master of Architecture degree in 1962 from Yale School of Architecture, where he won both the William Wirt Winchester Fellowship as the outstanding graduate and a Fulbright Grant. While at Yale, he studied under Paul Rudolph.

Gwathmey was president of the board of trustees for The Institute for Architecture and Urban Studies and was elected a fellow of the American Institute of Architects in 1981.

== Career ==
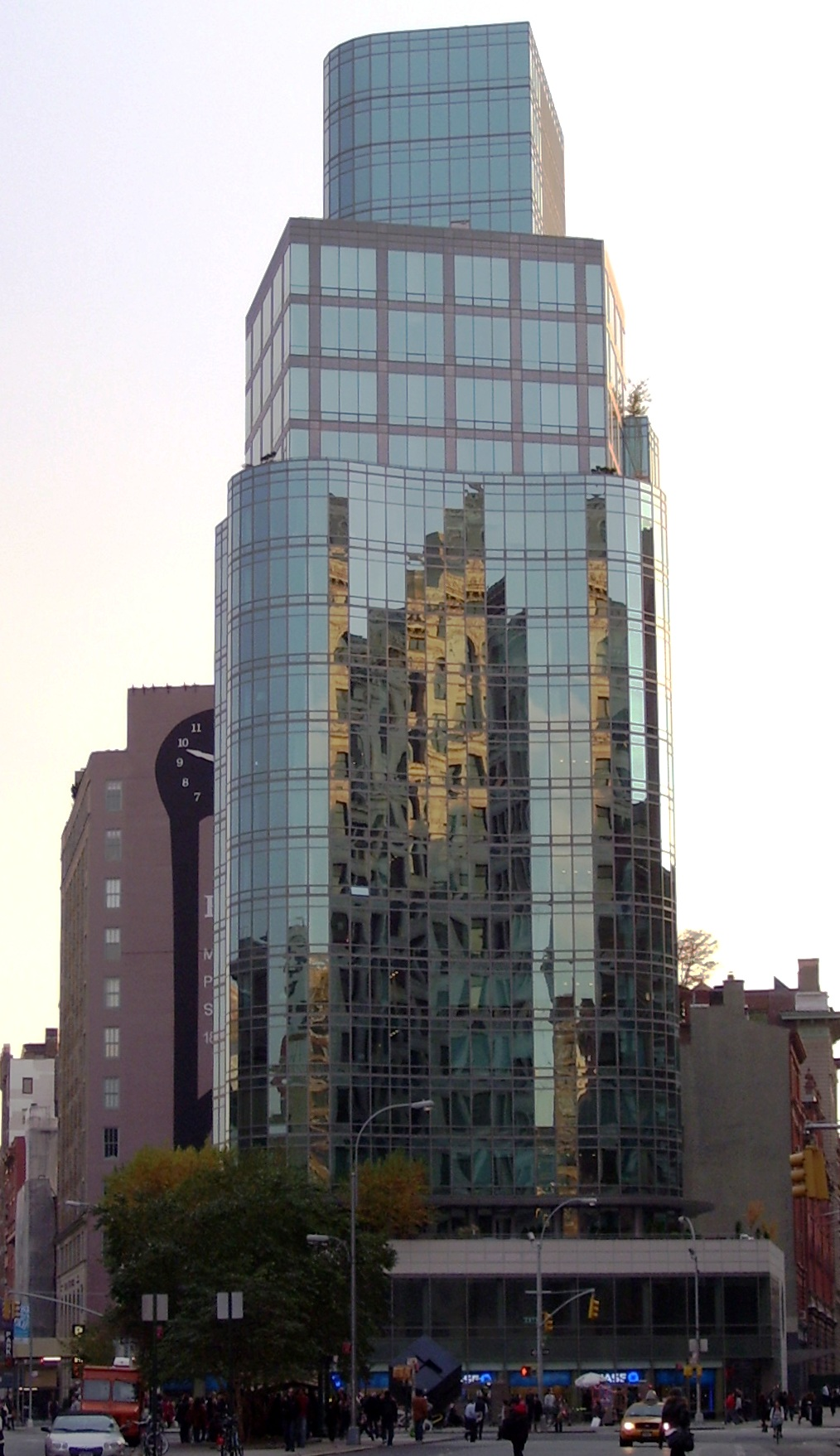
Gwathmey designed this condominium tower at 445 Lafayette Street where Lafayette, Cooper Square and Astor Place come together.

In 1965, at age 28 and only three years out of the Yale School of Architecture, and not yet a licensed architect, he designed a house and studio for his parents in Amagansett, New York, that became famous and revolutionized beach house design. When he did take the professional licensing exam, he was surprised to see a multiple-choice question on the test that asked "Which of these is the organic house?" The choices included the house he designed for his parents. He wanted to answer that the organic house was his, but in order to pass the exam he chose Frank Lloyd Wright's Fallingwater House. He knew that was the answer they wanted. He passed.

By 1977, Gwathmey had designed 21 houses and renovations while still under 40 years old and ten years of practice. From 1965 through 1991, Gwathmey taught at Pratt Institute, Cooper Union for the Advancement of Science and Art, Princeton University, Columbia University, the University of Pennsylvania, the University of Texas, and the University of California at Los Angeles. He was Davenport Professor (1983 and 1999) and Bishop Professor (1991) at Yale, and the Eliot Noyes Visiting Professor at Harvard University (1985). Gwathmey was the Spring 2005 William A. Bernoudy Resident in Architecture at the American Academy in Rome.

Gwathmey's firm designed the Museum Of Contemporary Art of North Miami, Florida in 1995, and the Astor Place Tower, a 21-story condominium project in Manhattan's East Village, in 2005. In 2011 the Ron Brown Building would be the new home of the United States Mission to the United Nations for which he was the lead architect. The building was dedicated to him. In her remarks, Ambassador Susan Rice thanked Gwathmey posthumously.

== Personal life ==
His first marriage to Emily Margolin, a writer, ended in divorce. He had one child from that marriage, Annie Gwathmey. In 1974 Gwathmey married Bette-Ann Damson.

Gwathmey died of esophageal cancer on August 3, 2009, one day before the opening of Bay Lake Tower, one of his projects. He was 71. His wife donated his archives to Yale University in 2010.

== Awards and honors ==
Gwathmey was the recipient of the Brunner Prize from the American Academy of Arts and Letters in 1970, and in 1976 he was elected to the academy. In 1983, he won the Medal of Honor from the New York Chapter of the American Institute of Architects and in 1985, he received the first Yale Alumni Arts Award from the Yale School of Architecture. In 1988 the Guild Hall Academy of Arts awarded Gwathmey its Lifetime Achievement Medal in Visual Arts, followed in 1990 by a Lifetime Achievement Award from the New York State Society of Architects. Gwathmey was the only architect named in the Leadership in America issue of Time magazine.

== Completed projects ==
Building/project	Location	Country	Date
Robert Gwathmey Residence	Amagansett, New York	United States	1965
Straus Residence	Purchase, New York	United States	1966
Joseph Sedacca Residence	Northwest Harbor, New York	United States	1968
The Jack D. and Barbara Weiss Goldberg Residence	Manchester, CT	United States	1969
Cooper Residence	Orleans, MA	United States	1969
Dunaway Residence	New York, New York	United States	1970
The Loring Mandel House	Huntington Bay, New York	United States	1970
The Paul and Kay Breslow Apartment	New York, New York	United States	1973
The Maurice and Marilyn Cohn Residence	Amagansett, New York	United States	1973
East Campus Housing and Academic Center, Columbia University	New York, New York	United States	1973
The Charof Residence	Montauk, New York	United States	1976
The Buettner Residence	Sloatsburg, New York	United States	1977
The Richard and Thea Benenson House	Rye, New York	United States	1977
The David Geffen Apartment	New York, New York	United States	1979
The Lloyd Taft House	Cincinnati, Ohio	United States	1979
de Menil Residence	Amagansett, New York	United States	1982
Sycamore Place Senior Housing	Columbus, Indiana	United States	1982
Pence Place Family Housing	Columbus, Indiana	United States	1984
The Steven Spielberg Apartment	New York, New York	United States	1985
American Museum of the Moving Image	Queens, New York	United States	1988
The Morgan Stanley Building	New York City, New York	United States	1990
Solomon R. Guggenheim Museum addition	New York City, New York	United States	1992
Yale Arts Complex addition	New Haven, Connecticut	United States	2006
445 Lafayette Street	New York City, New York	United States	2006
Glenstone (residence and guest house)	Potomac, Maryland	United States	2006
Renovation and expansion of the Yale School of Architecture	New Haven, Connecticut	United States	2008
Bay Lake Tower	Walt Disney World Resort	United States	2009
Cleveland State University Student Center	Cleveland, Ohio	United States	2010
United States Mission to the United Nations	New York City, New York	United States	2011 (lead architect-completed posthumously)
