= U.S. Post Office – Orofino Main =

- US Post Office--Orofino Main
- U.S. National Register of Historic Places
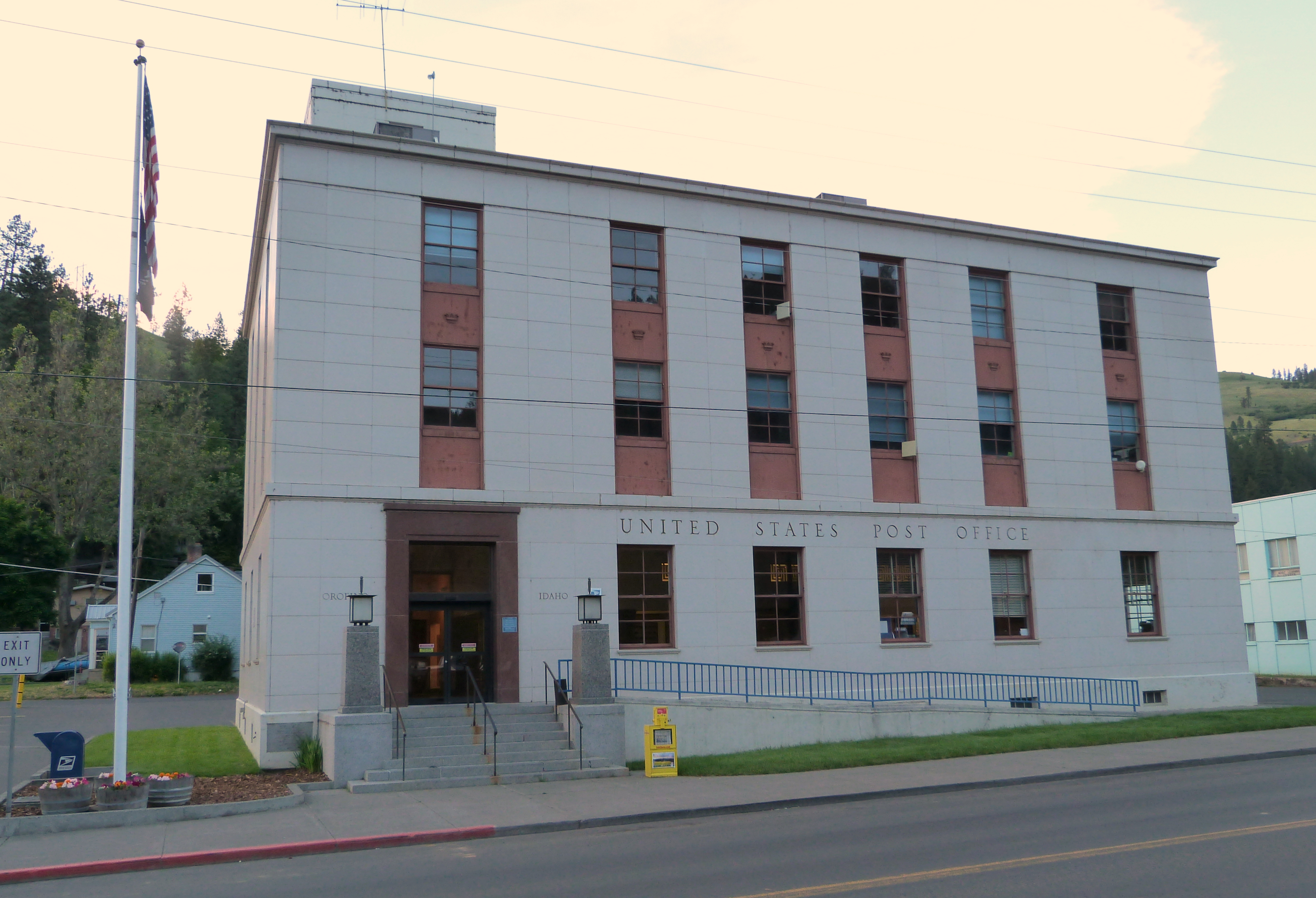

- Location within Idaho Location within the United States
- Interactive map showing the location for U.S. Post Office-Orofino Main
- Location: 320 Michigan Ave., Orofino, Idaho
- Coordinates: 46°28′49″N 116°15′09″W
- Area: 0.5 acres (0.20 ha)
- Built: 1940
- Architect: Louis A. Simon
- Architectural style: Moderne
- MPS: US Post Offices in Idaho 1900--1941 MPS
- NRHP reference No.: 89000133
- Added to NRHP: March 16, 1989

The Orofino Main Post Office, known also as U.S. Post Office – Orofino Main, located at 320 Michigan Ave. in Orofino in Clearwater County, Idaho, was listed on the National Register of Historic Places in 1989. Its Moderne design is credited to Louis A. Simon.

It is a three-story building on a raised basement with six bays on its front facade.
