= Astor Place Tower =

Residential skyscraper in Manhattan, New York

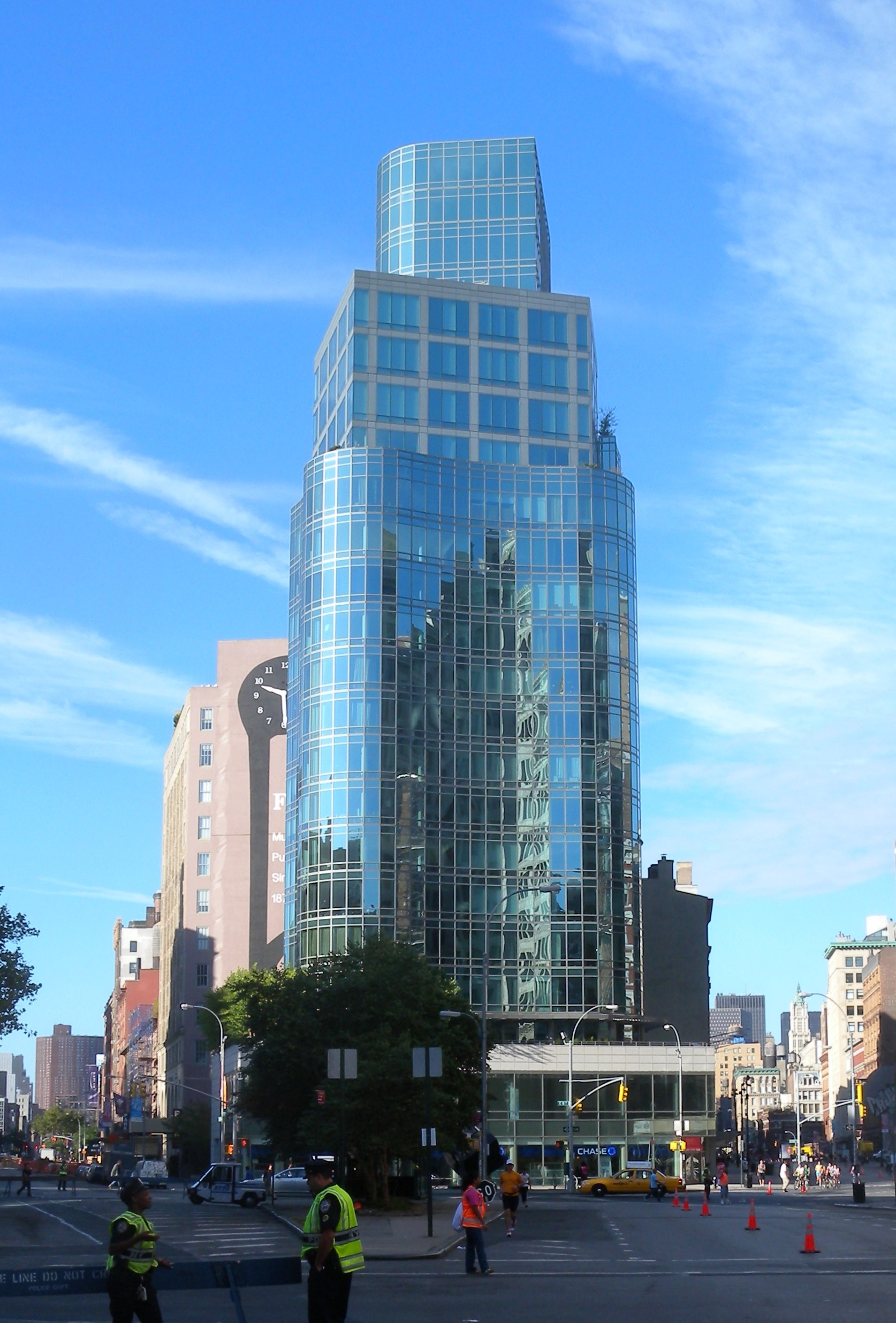
- Interactive map of the Astor Place Tower area

General information
- Status: Completed
- Type: Mixed use
- Location: 26 Astor Place, Manhattan, New York, United States
- Coordinates: 40.729527°N 73.991307°W
- Construction started: 2003
- Completed: 2005
- Cost: $50,000,000

Height
- Height: 269 feet (82 m)

Technical details
- Floor count: 21

Design and construction
- Architect: Charles Gwathmey

Astor Place Tower (also known as Sculpture for Living) is a 21-story residential building located on Astor Place in the NoHo neighborhood of Manhattan in New York City. The building was developed by The Related Companies and designed by architect Charles Gwathmey. The building was panned by architectural critics as a symbol of gentrification, and sales of the building's condos were slow.

== History and development ==
The triangular site on which the tower was built was formerly a parking lot. Originally, a building developed by both Ian Schrager and Related, to be designed by either Rem Koolhaas or Frank Gehry, was planned for the location. Cooper Union, the owner of the parking lot, leased the land to the developers for 99 years.

The original plan called for a hotel with approximately 100 rooms, and the terms of the lease from Cooper Union stipulated that the building be an "original artistic invention". The hotel was also to include a movie theater; completion of the building was expected in 2002. Ultimately, the hotel was not built, and instead, a luxury residential building designed by Gwathmey was constructed. There is a retail base which includes a Chase bank branch.
