= Rupert Town Square Historic District =

Historic district in Idaho, United States

- U.S. National Register of Historic Places
- U.S. Historic district
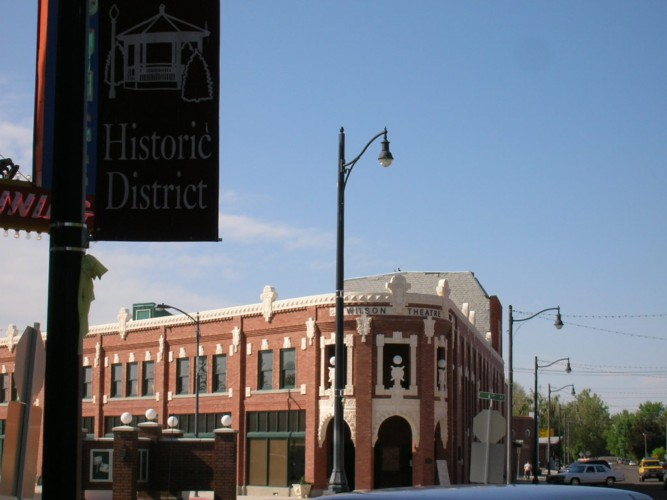

- Location within Idaho Location within the United States
- Location: Roughly bounded by 7th St., E St., 5th St. and F St., 702 E St. and 405 6th St., Rupert, Idaho
- Coordinates: 42°37′15″N 113°40′22″W
- Area: 15 acres (6.1 ha)
- Architect: Walter T. Paine, Thomas C. Havell
- Architectural style: Colonial Revival, Art Deco, Early Commercial, Moderne
- NRHP reference No.: 00001626 (original); 10000074 (increase)

Significant dates
- Added to NRHP: January 17, 2001
- Boundary increase: March 17, 2010

The Rupert Town Square Historic District in Rupert in Minidoka County, Idaho is a historic district which was listed on the National Register of Historic Places in 2001.

It is centered around the Rupert City Park. It includes a post office, a city hall, and a fire station.

In the original 2001 listing it was a 14.2 acres (5.7 ha) area roughly bounded by 7th St., E St., 5th St., and F St. It was enlarged in 2010 by about 1 acre (0.40 ha) to add 702 E St. and 405 6th St. It includes a total of 34 contributing buildings, 11 non-contributing buildings, one contributing structure, and one contributing site.
