= Robert Gwathmey =

American social realist painter

- Born: January 24, 1903; Manchester, Virginia, United States
- Died: September 21, 1988 (aged 85); Southampton, New York, United States
- Occupation: American Social Realist painter
- Spouse: Rosalie Gwathmey
- Children: Charles Gwathmey

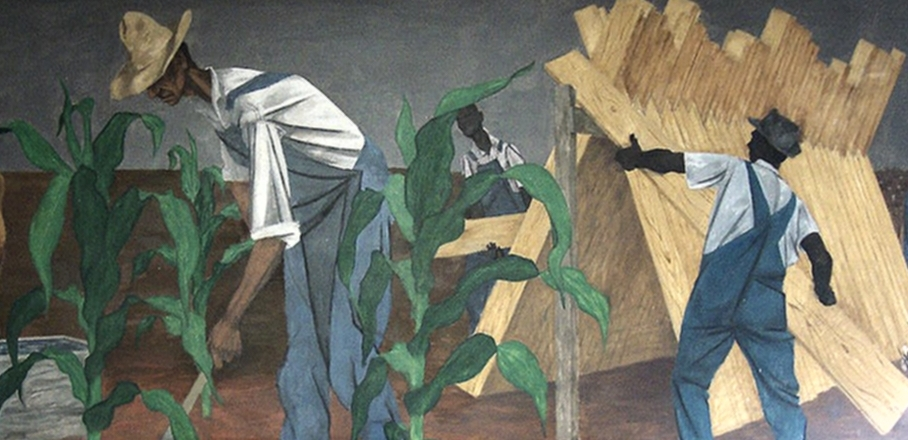
The Countryside (1941), mural for the post office in Eutaw, Alabama, commissioned by the Section of Painting and Sculpture

Robert Gwathmey (January 24, 1903 – September 21, 1988) was an American social realist painter. His wife was photographer Rosalie Gwathmey and his son was architect Charles Gwathmey.

Robert was born to Robert Gwathmey Sr. (1866–1902) and Eva Mortimer Harrison (1868–1941). His half sisters were Kathrine and Ida Carrington. Robert Sr. was killed at work by an explosion and his wife was killed in a vehicular accident.

== Education ==
Gwathmey attended North Carolina State College in Raleigh, studying business from 1922-1923. He did not think this path would take him anywhere so he got a job on a freighter and later studied a year at the Maryland Institute of Design in Baltimore. The Pennsylvania Academy of the Fine Arts in Philadelphia is where he completed his education of the arts; he spent four years there.

In 1929 and 1930, Gwathmey was the winner of the Cresson Traveling Scholarship, which allowed him the opportunity to study abroad in the summers. He traveled to Paris, Madrid, Barcelona, Genoa, Pisa, Florence, Venice, Vienna, Munich, and London.

== Artwork ==
Throughout his studies, Robert Gwathmey was influenced by many artists, including Pablo Picasso, Henri Matisse, Vincent van Gogh, and Rufino Tamayo from the European modernists, French satirist Honoré Daumier, realist painter Jean-François Millet along with Daumier and Degas.

Gwathmey is known for simplifying compositions and using symbolic abstraction to create his messages. His style is recognized by the color, shapes, and figures he uses in his artwork.

When asked about being a "social artist" this was his reply: "I'm a social being and I don't see how you can be an artist and be separate....Artists have eyes...You go home. You see things that are almost forgotten. It's always shocking."

== Life ==
After finishing school, Robert Gwathmey was a professor at several colleges: Temple University in Philadelphia (1930-1932), Beaver College in Glenside, PA (1930–1937), Carnegie Institute of Technology, Pittsburgh, PA (1939–1942), the Cooper Union School of Art, New York City (1942–1968), New School for Social Research, New York (1946–1949), and Boston University (1968–1969). He was an instructor to artists Alvin Carl Hollingsworth, Alex Katz and Faith Ringgold .

He was also an activist for several political movements; because of this he was watched by the FBI for the last twenty-seven years of his life. In 1964 he became treasurer of Mark Lane's Citizens Committee of Inquiry.

== Awards ==
- 1973 Elected into National Academy of Design
- 1944 Rosenwald Fellowship; Second Prize, “Painting in the United States,” Carnegie Institute of Technology; First Prize, Artists for Victory Exhibition at National Graphic Arts Competition; Purchase Prize, America at War Competition sponsored by Artists for Victory
- 1941 First Purchase Prize, Contemporary Water Color Show, San Diego Fine Art Gallery
- 1941 Watercolor Prize, Associated Artists of Pittsburgh
- 1929-30 Cresson Fellowship

== Exhibitions ==
- 2008 “Painting in the United States: 1943-1949,” Westmoreland Museum of American Art, Greensburg, PA “The American Scene,” British Museum, London
- 2007 “American Social Realism: 1920-1950,” Forum Gallery, New York City
- 2004 “Everyday Mysteries: Modern and Contemporary Still Life,” DC Moore Gallery, New York City
- 2000 “Robert Gwathmey: Master Painter,” Telfair Art Museum, Savannah, GA; Pennsylvania Academy of Fine Art, PA “Robert Gwathmey: A Retrospective,” Virginia Historical Society, Richmond, VA
- 1999 “Robert Gwathmey: Master Painter of the Old South,” Butler Museum of American Art, Youngstown, OH “Childe Hassam, Robert Gwathmey, Fairfield Porter, Ben Shahn, and Jules Pascin,” ACA Galleries, New York City
- 1998 “In the Eye of the Storm: An Art of Conscience 1930-1970,” Frederick R. Weismann Art Museum, Minneapolis, MN
- 1997 Greg Kucera Gallery, Seattle WA
- 1985 Exhibition at the Cooper Union School of Art
- 1976 Solo exhibition at St. Mary’s College of Maryland Solo exhibition at Terry Dintenfass Inc., New York City
- 1967 Annual Exhibition of Contemporary American Painting, Whitney Museum of American Art, New York City
- 1966 Brooklyn Museum, NY
- 1956 “Let’s Face It: An Exhibition of Contemporary Portraits,” Contemporary Arts Museum, Houston, TX
- 1952 Walker Art Center, Minneapolis, MN
- 1946 Solo show at the ACA Gallery in New York City Joint exhibition with photographer (and wife) Rosalie Hook Gwathmey at the Virginia Museum of Fine Arts in Richmond. “Advancing American Art,” overseas traveling exhibition sponsored by the US State Department
- 1944 Walker Art Center, Minneapolis, MN
- 1943 Walker Art Center, Minneapolis, MN Whitney Museum of American Art, NY Art Institute of Chicago, IL
- 1941 ACA Gallery in New York City (solo) Contemporary Water Color Show, San Diego Fine Arts Gallery

== Collections ==
- Brooklyn Museum
- The Johnson Collection
- Kalamazoo Institute of Arts, Kalamazoo, MI
- LACMA, Los Angeles
- Museum of Modern Art, New York
- Philadelphia Museum of Art
- Smithsonian American Art Museum
- Whitney Museum of American Art

== In popular culture ==
In Elia Kazan's novel The Arrangement when Evangelos is describing to Florence the property that she can keep for herself he says: "...all paintings, even that by Picasso and Gwathmey."
