= National Register of Historic Places listings in Canyon County, Idaho =

Location of Canyon County in Idaho

This is a list of the National Register of Historic Places listings in Canyon County, Idaho.

This is intended to be a complete list of the properties and districts on the National Register of Historic Places in Canyon County, Idaho, United States. Latitude and longitude coordinates are provided for many National Register properties and districts; these locations may be seen together in an online map.

There are 50 properties and districts listed on the National Register in the county. More may be added; properties and districts nationwide are added to the Register weekly.

This National Park Service list is complete through NPS recent listings posted November 6, 2026.

== Current listings ==
	Name on the Register	Image	Date listed	Location	City or town	Description
1	F. F. Beale House	F. F. Beale House	May 14, 1993 (#93000386)	1802 Cleveland Boulevard; 43°39′25″N 116°40′46″W	Caldwell	
2	Blatchley Hall	Blatchley Hall	March 8, 1978 (#78001055)	College of Idaho campus 43°39′09″N 116°40′31″W	Caldwell	
3	Boise River and Canal Bridge	Boise River and Canal Bridge	February 7, 2007 (#07000003)	Plymouth St. 43°41′20″N 116°41′13″W	Caldwell	
4	Caldwell Carnegie Library	Caldwell Carnegie Library	June 18, 1979 (#79000784)	1101 Cleveland Boulevard; 43°39′44″N 116°41′10″W	Caldwell	
5	Caldwell Historic District	Caldwell Historic District	July 19, 1982 (#82002509)	Roughly bounded by Railroad and Arthur Sts. and 7th and 9th Aves. 43°39′59″N 116°41′16″W	Caldwell	
6	Caldwell Municipal Rose Garden		October 30, 2026 (#100013557)	1200 N Kimball Avenue; 43°39′31″N 116°41′50″W	Caldwell	
7	Caldwell Odd Fellow Home for the Aged	Caldwell Odd Fellow Home for the Aged	November 17, 1982 (#82000322)	N. 14th Ave. 43°39′59″N 116°40′24″W	Caldwell	
8	Caldwell Residential Historic District	Caldwell Residential Historic District	September 23, 2002 (#02001064)	Roughly bounded by Cleveland Boulevard, Everett St., S. 12th Ave., and S. 20th Ave. 43°39′28″N 116°40′56″W	Caldwell	
9	E. H. Dewey Stores	E. H. Dewey Stores	November 17, 1982 (#82000323)	1013-1015 1st St., S. 43°34′47″N 116°33′41″W	Nampa	
10	Diversion Dam and Deer Flat Embankments	Diversion Dam and Deer Flat Embankments	March 15, 1976 (#76000666)	Southeast of Boise on the Boise River; 43°34′26″N 116°42′23″W	Boise	Extends into Ada County
11	Henry W. and Ida Frost Dorman House	Henry W. and Ida Frost Dorman House	July 5, 2000 (#00000756)	114 E. Logan St. 43°39′17″N 116°41′50″W	Caldwell	
12	Farmers and Merchants Bank	Farmers and Merchants Bank	May 13, 1976 (#76000670)	101 11th Ave., S. 43°34′46″N 116°33′40″W	Nampa	
13	Fort Boise and Riverside Ferry Sites	Fort Boise and Riverside Ferry Sites	December 24, 1974 (#74000736)	Northwest of Parma on the Snake River; 43°49′25″N 117°01′13″W	Parma	
14	Guffey Butte – Black Butte Archeological District	Guffey Butte – Black Butte Archeological District	October 10, 1978 (#78001038)	Along approximately 34 miles (55 km) of the Snake River in Canyon, Ada, Owyhee, and Elmore counties 43°17′57″N 116°31′18″W	Grand View	
15	Horse Barn	Horse Barn	October 11, 1978 (#78001057)	Northeast of Nampa at Idaho State School and Hospital; 43°36′12″N 116°31′32″W	Nampa	
16	Ellen Houlder Farm	Ellen Houlder Farm	June 23, 1994 (#94000631)	Arena Valley Rd. (Route 2) west of Wilder; 43°40′49″N 116°59′28″W	Wilder	
17	Idaho State Sanitarium Administration Building	Idaho State Sanitarium Administration Building	November 17, 1982 (#82000324)	Northeast of Nampa on 11th Ave., N. 43°36′09″N 116°31′53″W	Nampa	
18	Thomas K. Little House	Thomas K. Little House	August 18, 1980 (#80001295)	703 E. Belmont St. 43°40′08″N 116°41′08″W	Caldwell	
19	Jacob P. Lockman House	Jacob P. Lockman House	July 27, 2005 (#05000735)	23 9th Ave. N 43°34′58″N 116°33′40″W	Nampa	
20	MacMillan Chapel	MacMillan Chapel	September 7, 1984 (#84000989)	18121 Dean Ln; 43°38′10″N 116°31′19″W	Nampa	MacMillan Chapel was moved in 2004 from Ada County to Canyon County, and it is included on the Ada County page under former listings.
21	Map Rock Petroglyphs Historic District	Map Rock Petroglyphs Historic District	November 15, 1982 (#82000325)	Map Rock Rd. 43°25′16″N 116°42′17″W	Givens Hot Springs	
22	Melba I.O.O.F. Lodge Hall	Melba I.O.O.F. Lodge Hall	January 25, 2024 (#100009871)	310 Carrie Rex Avenue; 43°22′30″N 116°31′47″W	Melba	
23	Mercy Hospital		August 19, 2014 (#14000504)	1615 8th St., S. 43°34′12″N 116°33′45″W	Nampa	Demolished in 2016
24	Middleton Substation	Middleton Substation	May 7, 1973 (#73000683)	State Highway 44; 43°42′23″N 116°37′07″W	Middleton	
25	Nampa American Legion Chateau	Nampa American Legion Chateau	November 17, 1982 (#82000326)	1508 2nd St., S. 43°34′33″N 116°33′26″W	Nampa	
26	Nampa and Meridian Irrigation District Office	Nampa and Meridian Irrigation District Office	November 17, 1982 (#82000329)	1503 1st St., S. 43°34′35″N 116°33′24″W	Nampa	
27	Nampa City Hall	Nampa City Hall	May 9, 1985 (#85000967)	203 12th Ave., S. 43°34′41″N 116°33′41″W	Nampa	Demolished in 1991
28	Nampa Department Store	Nampa Department Store	November 17, 1982 (#82000327)	1st St., S. and 13th Ave. 43°34′40″N 116°33′31″W	Nampa	
29	Nampa Depot	Nampa Depot	November 3, 1972 (#72000438)	12th Ave. and Front St. 43°34′47″N 116°33′31″W	Nampa	
30	Nampa First Methodist Episcopal Church	Nampa First Methodist Episcopal Church	November 17, 1982 (#82000328)	12th Ave., S. and 4th St. 43°34′34″N 116°33′46″W	Nampa	
31	Nampa Historic District	Nampa Historic District	August 18, 1983 (#83000284)	1200 and 1300 blocks S. 1st St. 43°34′41″N 116°33′31″W	Nampa	
32	Nampa Presbyterian Church	Nampa Presbyterian Church	November 17, 1982 (#82000330)	2nd St. and 15th Ave., S. 43°34′33″N 116°33′29″W	Nampa	
33	Nampa Valley Grange No.131	Nampa Valley Grange No.131	February 13, 2013 (#13000002)	203 5th Ave., S. 43°34′59″N 116°34′07″W	Nampa	
34	North Caldwell Historic District	North Caldwell Historic District	September 5, 1979 (#79000785)	9th, Albany, and Belmont Sts. 43°40′01″N 116°41′03″W	Caldwell	
35	George Obendorf Gothic Arch Truss Barn	George Obendorf Gothic Arch Truss Barn	October 28, 1999 (#99001278)	24047 Batt Corner Rd. 43°43′14″N 116°55′23″W	Wilder	
36	Old Nampa Neighborhood Historic District	Old Nampa Neighborhood Historic District	March 21, 2007 (#07000164)	Roughly bounded by 4th Ave., S, 4th St., S, 11th Ave., S, and 9th St., S. 43°34′41″N 116°34′10″W	Nampa	
37	Parma State Bank		October 1, 2026 (#100013496)	121 N. 3rd Street; 43°47′07″N 116°56′39″W	Parma	
38	Peckham Barn	Peckham Barn	October 7, 1982 (#82000389)	North of Wilder on U.S. Route 95; 43°41′01″N 116°54′37″W	Wilder	
39	John C. Rice House	John C. Rice House	May 27, 1980 (#80001296)	1520 Cleveland Boulevard; 43°39′31″N 116°40′55″W	Caldwell	Building has apparently been moved. New location: 43.651062, -116.680252
40	Roswell Grade School	Roswell Grade School	November 17, 1982 (#82000331)	State Highway 18 and Stephan Lane; 43°44′55″N 116°57′41″W	Roswell	
41	Sacred Hearts of Jesus and Mary Church	Sacred Hearts of Jesus and Mary Church	November 17, 1982 (#82000334)	608 7th St. 43°47′15″N 116°56′17″W	Parma	Building no longer exists.
42	St. Mary's Catholic Church	St. Mary's Catholic Church	November 17, 1982 (#82000332)	616 Dearborn St. 43°39′51″N 116°41′32″W	Caldwell	
43	St. Paul's Rectory and Sisters' House	St. Paul's Rectory and Sisters' House	November 17, 1982 (#82000333)	810 15th Ave., S. 43°34′15″N 116°33′49″W	Nampa	Building no longer exists.
44	Sterry Hall	Sterry Hall	March 8, 1978 (#78001056)	College of Idaho campus 43°39′14″N 116°40′36″W	Caldwell	
45	A. K. Steunenberg House	A. K. Steunenberg House	November 17, 1982 (#82000335)	409 N. Kimball Ave. 43°40′09″N 116°41′02″W	Caldwell	
46	A. H. Stewart House	A. H. Stewart House	October 25, 1979 (#79000786)	3rd St. and Bates Ave; 43°47′10″N 116°56′37″W	Parma	Building no longer exists.
47	Carrie Adell Strahorn Memorial Library	Carrie Adell Strahorn Memorial Library	April 15, 1982 (#82002510)	College of Idaho campus 43°39′10″N 116°40′36″W	Caldwell	
48	U.S. Post Office – Caldwell Main	U.S. Post Office – Caldwell Main	March 16, 1989 (#89000131)	823 Arthur St. 43°39′55″N 116°41′14″W	Caldwell	
49	U.S. Post Office – Nampa Main	U.S. Post Office – Nampa Main	March 16, 1989 (#89000132)	123 11th Ave., S. 43°34′45″N 116°33′42″W	Nampa	
50	H. Orton Wiley House	H. Orton Wiley House	September 11, 1986 (#86002163)	524 E. Dewey Ave. 43°33′49″N 116°33′58″W	Nampa	Built in 1922-23, significant for association with H. Orton Wiley and Northwest Nazarene College.

== Former listings ==
	Name on the Register	Image	Date listed	Date removed	Location	City or town	Description
1	Academy Building, College of Idaho		October 11, 1978 (#78001054)	January 31, 1986	1015 Albany St.	Caldwell	

== See also ==
- List of National Historic Landmarks in Idaho
- National Register of Historic Places listings in Idaho
