= List of United States post offices in Idaho =

United States post offices operate under the authority of the United States Post Office Department (1792–1971) or the United States Postal Service (since 1971). Historically, post offices were usually placed in a prominent location. Many were architecturally distinctive, including notable buildings featuring Beaux-Arts, Art Deco, and Vernacular architecture. However, modern U.S. post offices were generally designed for functionality rather than architectural style.

Following is a list of United States post offices in Idaho. Notable post offices include individual buildings, whether still in service or not, which have architectural, historical, or community-related significance. Many of these are listed on the National Register of Historic Places (NRHP) or state and local historic registers.

Post office	City	Date built	Image	Architect	Notes	Ref.
United States Post Office–Blackfoot Main	Blackfoot	1936		Gilbert Stanley Underwood	(Note: Listed on the National Register of Historic Places.) (Note: Houses the New Deal murals The Arrival Celebration and The Round-Up by Andrew Standing Soldier.)	
Old Federal Building and US Post Office	Boise	1901		William S. Campbell, James L. Knox	(Note: No longer used as a post office.)	
Bonners Ferry Main Post Office	Bonners Ferry	1937–1938		Louis A. Simon		
United States Post Office-Buhl Main	Buhl	1940		Louis A. Simon	(Note: Houses the New Deal mural Snake River Ferry by Richard Guy Walton.)	
United States Post Office (Burley, Idaho)	Burley	1935		Louis A. Simon, George O. Von Nerta	(Note: Houses the New Deal mural Pioneers on the Oregon Trail along the Snake River by Elizabeth Lochrie.)	
U.S. Post Office – Caldwell Main	Caldwell	1932		James A. Wetmore		
Coeur d'Alene Federal Building	Coeur d'Alene	1928		L. L. Welch		
United States Post Office (Grangeville, Idaho)	Grangeville	1941				
United States Post Office (Idaho Falls, Idaho)	Idaho Falls	1916		James A. Wetmore, Oscar Wenderoth		
United States Post Office-Kellogg Main	Kellogg	1937		Louis A. Simon	(Note: Houses the New Deal mural Discovery by Fletcher Martin.)	
Moscow Post Office and Courthouse, now Moscow City Hall	Moscow	1911		James Knox Taylor		
United States Post Office-Nampa Main	Nampa	1931		James A. Wetmore		
United States Post Office-Orofino Main	Orofino	1940		Louis A. Simon, Neal A. Melick		
United States Post Office-Payette Main	Payette	1937		Louis A. Simon		
Pocatello Post Office, now Pocatello Federal Building	Pocatello	1916		Frank H. Paradice		
United States Post Office-Preston Main	Preston	1940		Louis A. Simon, Neal A. Melick	(Note: Houses the New Deal mural The Battle of Bear River by Edmond J. Fitzgerald.)	
United States Post Office-St. Anthony Main	St. Anthony	1938		Louis A. Simon	(Note: Houses the New Deal mural The Fur Traders by Elizabeth Lochrie.)	
United States Post Office-Wallace Main	Wallace	1936		Harry B. Carter, Louis A. Simon		
Weiser Post Office	Weiser	1932		Tourtellotte & Hummel		
Wickahoney Post Office and Stage Station	Wickahoney	1890s		Dow Dunning		
