= E. H. Dewey Stores =

U.S. historic building

- U.S. National Register of Historic Places
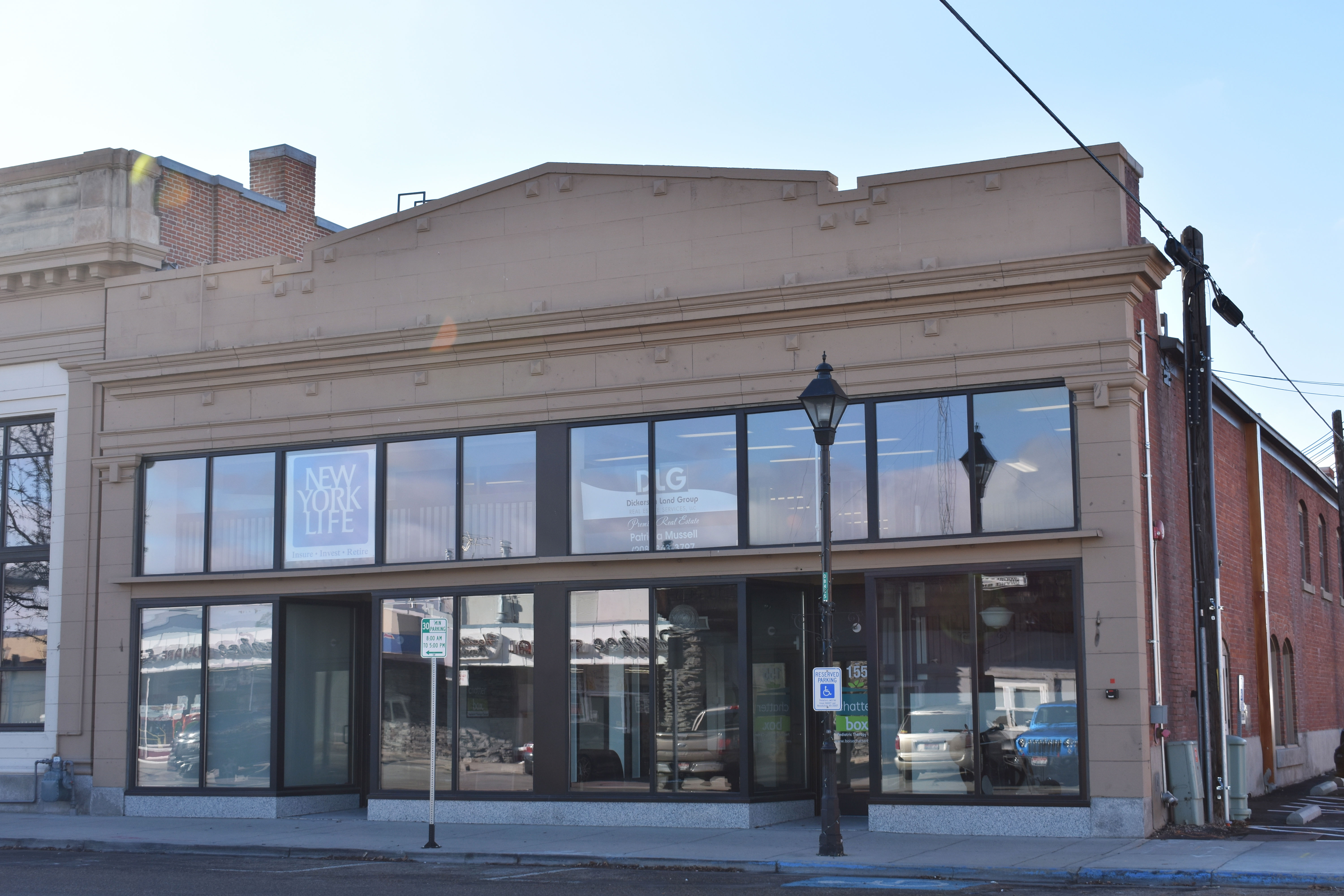
- E.H. Dewey Stores in 2019

- Location within Idaho Location within the United States
- Location: 1013-15 1st. St., S., Nampa, Idaho
- Coordinates: 43°34′48″N 116°33′38″W
- Area: less than one acre
- Built: 1919
- Architect: Tourtellotte & Hummel
- MPS: Tourtellotte and Hummel Architecture TR
- NRHP reference No.: 82000323
- Added to NRHP: November 17, 1982

The E. H. Dewey Stores in Nampa, Idaho, is the remnant of an L-shape building that once surrounded the Farmers and Merchants Bank at the corner of 11th Avenue and 1st Street. The L-shape was designed to contain two stores in each wing. The 1-story, stone and brick building was designed by Tourtellotte and Hummel and constructed in 1919, and it reveals a restrained Neoclassical architecture common in commercial buildings of the early 20th century. The building was added to the National Register of Historic Places in 1982.

== History ==
The Farmers and Merchants Bank building was constructed in 1919, and a major stockholder and bondholder in the bank was Edward H. Dewey, a Nampa financier with farming and mining interests in Idaho. Dewey served as Nampa mayor 1908–1912. Dewey owned lots adjacent to the corner bank, and in 1919 he developed the property into an L-shape commercial space with four storefronts to surround the bank. Part of the building facing 11th Avenue was later demolished, but frontage on 1st Street remains with little alteration.

The Dewey Building, originally known as the Purdum Building, was a drygoods store and later the location of The Idaho Press-Tribune. After the Nampa Public Library renovated the Farmers and Merchants Bank building in 1966, the adjacent Dewey Building became part of the library in 1985. When the library relocated to its current building, the Dewey Building was refitted for commercial space.

== See also ==
- Nampa Department Store
- National Register of Historic Places listings in Canyon County, Idaho
