= Caldwell Carnegie Library =

Caldwell Carnegie Library may refer to:

- Caldwell Carnegie Library (Caldwell, Idaho), listed on the National Register of Historic Places in Canyon County, Idaho
- Caldwell Carnegie Library (Caldwell, Kansas), listed on the National Register of Historic Places in Sumner County, Kansas
