= Caldwell Historic District =

- U.S. National Register of Historic Places
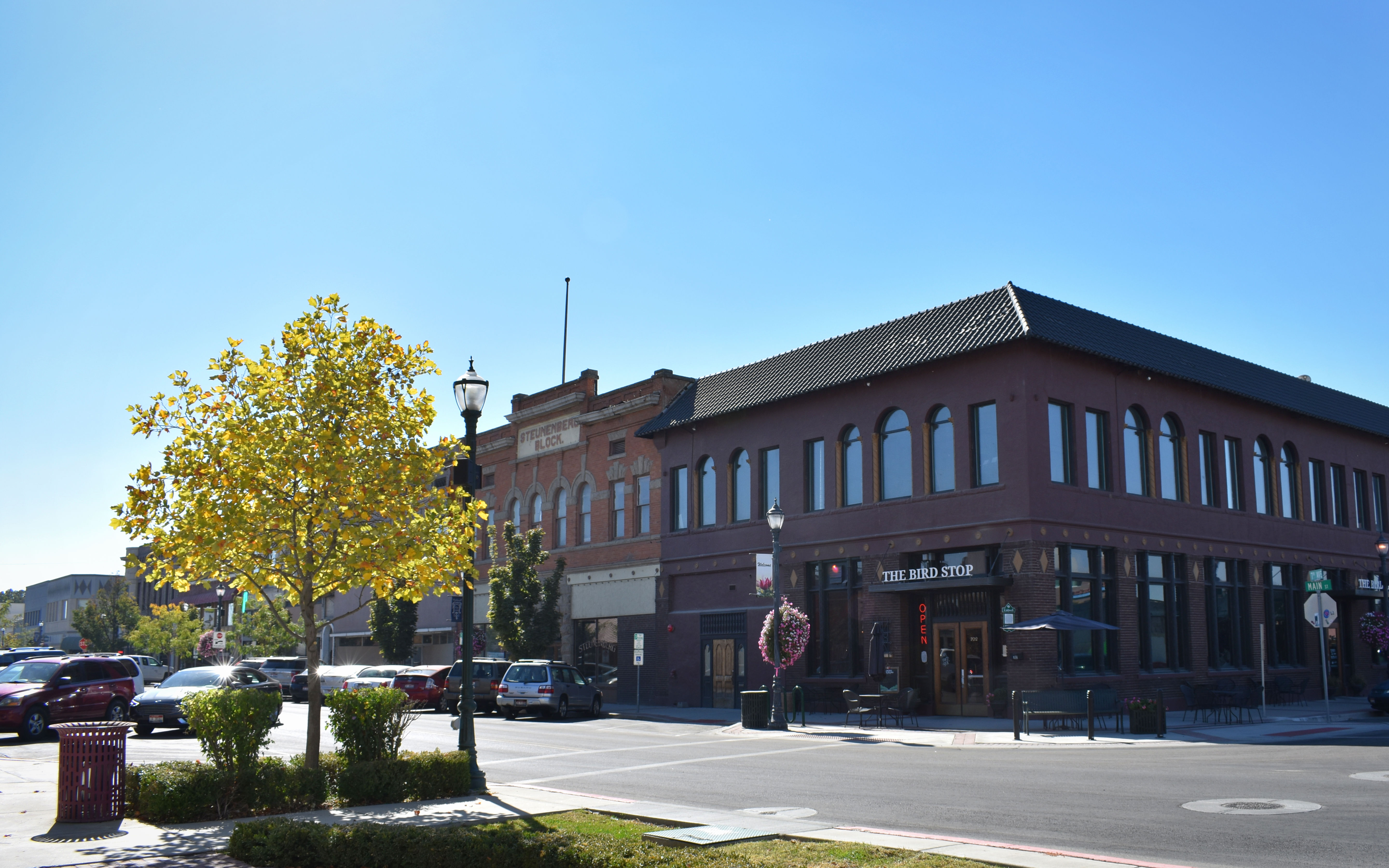
- The Caldwell Historic District in 2018

- Location within Idaho Location within the United States
- Location: Roughly bounded by Railroad and Arthur Sts. and 7th and 9th Aves. Caldwell, Idaho
- Coordinates: 43°39′59″N 116°41′16″W
- Area: 4 acres (1.6 ha)
- Built: 1894-1911
- Architectural style: Romanesque Revival and Commercial
- NRHP reference No.: 82002509
- Added to NRHP: July 19, 1982

The Caldwell Historic District in Caldwell, Idaho, is an area of approximately four acres in downtown Caldwell along Main Street, South 7th Avenue, South Kimball Avenue, and Arthur Street.

Fires in 1884 and in 1896 destroyed businesses in early Caldwell, and brick had become Caldwell's favored building material for downtown structures. In 1906 alone, brick construction on Main Street between South 7th and South Kimball Avenues included the Steunenberg Block, the Egleston Block, and expansion of the Lucas Block—soon known as the Little Block and later dubbed the Harmon Building. When the Caldwell Historic District was surveyed in 1982, many brick historic buildings adjacent to the district were not included.

The district includes Romanesque Revival and modest commercial architecture, although some facades have been altered since construction. The 1982 site survey noted 14 buildings, and the district was added to the National Register of Historic Places (NRHP) July 19, 1982.

== Original inventory ==
- Saratoga Hotel (1904), 624 Main Street. The Saratoga was a 3-story, Château style hotel and featured a Mansard roof with hipped dormers and corner turrets. Owner Ralph V. Sebree named the hotel after the Saratoga Hotel in Chicago, managed by his uncle. A 1923 renovation by Tourtellotte & Hummel removed the French details and expanded the hotel to four stories. The building was demolished after it burned in a fire on December 19, 1990.
- Commercial Building (1904), 702, 704 Main Street and 103, 105, 107 7th Ave. The 2-story Caldwell Commercial Bank, also known as the Caldwell Bank and Trust Building, was designed by Tourtellotte & Co. and featured Romanesque Revival architecture. An early and longtime tenant was the Agustus Greenlund drugstore, 1904-1975. The building was renovated by Tourtellotte & Hummel in 1928, and the style was altered toward Spanish Colonial Revival architecture.
- Steunenberg Block (1906), 706, 708 Main Street. The 2-story, Romanesque Revival style brick and sandstone building opened in August, 1906. Early tenants were the Herr Clothing Company and Boyes Hardware. Albert K. Steunenberg (September 11, 1863 - March 17, 1907) helped to organize the Caldwell Commercial Bank and the Caldwell Bank and Trust Co. He was also one of the owners of the Lowell-Steunenberg Building and the Lowell-Jackson-Steunenberg Building included below in the inventory.
- Egleston Block (1906), 710 Main Street. The 2-story Egleston building was designed by Tourtellotte & Co. and features sand colored brick. The Exchange Saloon, one of Caldwell's oldest buildings, was demolished to make room for the Egleston Block. Early tenants were a branch of Alexander, a men's clothing store owned by Moses Alexander, and the Baker & Harris Grocery Co.
- Roberts Building (1894); 712 Main Street. The 2-story Roberts Building is the earliest brick building in the district, and the facade incorporates Romanesque Revival features. The building replaced an earlier, wood frame structure at the same address which housed the Caldwell Butchering Company, begun in 1885 by owners Charles Picard and Mike Roberts. The Roberts Building later housed the Roberts Meat Market. In 1910 the Fraternal Order of Eagles leased the second floor of the building.
- Creative Printing (1911); 714 Main Street. The 2-story building was constructed between 1908 and 1911, and the 1911 Sanborn map indicates that the building functioned as a grocery store. At that time, the address was 716 Main Street, and the Roberts Building address was 714 Main Street. The Egleston Block occupied 710-712 Main Street, not 710 Main Street as current listings indicate. In 1920 Oakes Brothers, an adjacent business, converted the building to a storeroom.
- Oakes Brothers Store (1906); 720 Main Street. The 1-story Oakes Brothers Store, more recently known as Maddy's Plaza, is a brick building constructed as retail space for Oakes Bros., a dry goods and shoe store. In 1890 G. C. Oakes, R. W. Oakes, A. M. Oakes, and C. A. Oakes opened a dry goods store in Caldwell's new Masonic building. The partnership was dissolved in 1891 when A. M. Oakes retired, but the remaining brothers continued in business, and in 1906 they moved into a larger building in what became the Caldwell Historic District. The store was constructed on what had been the site of Mohrs Boarding House and the Haskell House Hotel.
- Harmon Building (1896); 722, 724 Main Street and 104 South Kimball Avenue. The 2-story Harmon Building was originally named the Lucas Block when the 1-story, brick building opened in 1896, and it replaced the wood frame Lucas Harness Shop at the same address. Features of the new building included an "elegant modern style with plate glass windows and colored skylights." Lucas reopened his harness shop on the Kimball side of the building, and grocer L. E. Hay was an early tenant as was dry goods merchant T. K. Little. Little bought the building in 1899, and in 1906 he and architect Thomas H. Soule added a second floor with a corner turret. In 1920 L. A. Harmon became part owner and moved the Harmon Drug Store into the building.
- Ballantyne Building (1910); 803 Main Street and 104 North Kimball Avenue. The 1-story brick and stone Ballantyne Building, also known as the Phoenix Building, was designed by Caldwell architect Thomas H. Soule for Alec Ballantyne of Ballantyne Mercantile Co., formerly The Ballantyne-Dee Mercantile Co. Beside Ballantyne Bros., early tenants of the building included Keeney & Cazier clothing and dry goods and the Owl Drug Store. Later, the Star Cigar Store and the Home Electric Bakery rented space.
- Western Building (1903); 105-111 South Kimball Avenue; 802 Main Street. The 2-story Western Building, also known as the Froman-Davis Building and as the Baker Brothers Building, featured brick construction with a corner turret when it was built in 1903 for George Froman and Charles Davis. Unusual for Caldwell at the time, Froman and Davis included a 12-foot wide cement sidewalk in front of the building on Main Street and on Kimball Avenue. By 1910 Caldwell would have in progress 300 miles of paved sidewalks. Early tenants of the Froman-Davis building were Baker Brothers Grocery, the Idaho Abstract Co., and Dorothy Stewart's Millinery Parlour. The building was remodeled in 1906 when the Western National Bank replaced Baker Brothers Grocery as the building's main tenant. In 1926 Alexander's menswear became the main tenant, and the company remodeled the building in 1932, installing larger windows and removing the corner turret.
- Union Block (1907); 113-123 South Kimball Avenue. The 2-story, brick and stone Union Block was designed by Caldwell architect Thomas H. Soule, with commercial space on the ground floor and offices above. Soon after construction, the second floor of the building became Caldwell's first major hospital, with 18 rooms and four attending physicians. Other early tenants were Barnes' Grocery, C. C. Smith Harness Shop, the Royal Cafe, and Cook & Over grocery. In 1908 J. T. Smith & Co. purchased Barnes' Grocery, and in the same year P. R. Getter bought J. T. Smith and opened the Union Grocery at the original Barnes location in the Union Block. When Cook & Over relocated in 1910, their storefront at the Union Block was replaced by the expanding Royal Cafe. Another eatery in the building as early as 1909 was the Fern Restaurant. The Union Block was saved from destruction by firefighters in 1907 when a fire destroyed the adjacent Commercial Hotel, also known as the Sisson Hotel, but the building eventually was demolished sometime after completion of the NRHP site survey of 1982.
- Caldwell News (1903); 114 7th Avenue South. The 1-story Caldwell News building was a brick and stone structure that served the publishing needs of a local newspaper. In 1907 while F. G. Burroughs was publisher, fire damage caused a $4000 loss to the paper. J. Walter Johnson succeeded Burroughs as publisher in 1911, but in that year John C. Rice succeeded Johnson. In 1928, the Caldwell News merged with The Caldwell Tribune to become the Caldwell News-Tribune. The building was demolished sometime after a fire burned the adjacent Saratoga Hotel in 1990.
- Rice Building (1906); 113-117 7th Avenue South. Named for John C. Rice, the stone and brick Rice Building, also known either as the Lowell-Steunenberg Building or as the Steunenberg and Lowell Block, may have been designed by architect C. L. Lee. Informally known as the Post Office Block, the building included the Caldwell Post Office as an early tenant. The Bell Telephone exchange office and E. H. Adams Stationery were other early tenants. After a 1910 renovation, tenants included the Caldwell News and grocers Cook & Over. Cook & Over soon was purchased by grocers Van Hyming and Manning, and the Caldwell News was purchased by John C. Rice. Rice bought the building and the adjacent Lowell Building in 1909.
- Lowell Building (1907); 701, 705 Arthur Street and 121, 123 7th Avenue South. The 2-story brick and stone Lowell Building, also known as either the Lowell-Jackson building or the Lowell-Jackson-Steunenberg building, was designed by Boise architect C. L. Lee. The Caldwell Commercial Club leased the second floor, and other early tenants included the San Francisco, Idaho & Montana Railroad, Steunenberg Bros. Shoes, F. H. Bowen Jewelry, A. M. DeFrance & Co. Pool & Billiard Hall, and Sloan & Merritt Grocery. Owners included J. H. Lowell, a partner in the real estate firm of Lowell & Madden and an officer of the Caldwell Banking & Trust Co., A. K. Steunenberg, cashier of the bank, and T. S. Jackson, a partner in the legal firm of Jackson & Walters. In 1909 John C. Rice purchased the building and the adjacent Lowell-Steunenberg Building, and by that time the buildings together were known as the Lowell-Jackson building., although in 1909 The Caldwell News referenced the Rice and Lowell Block.

== Street names ==
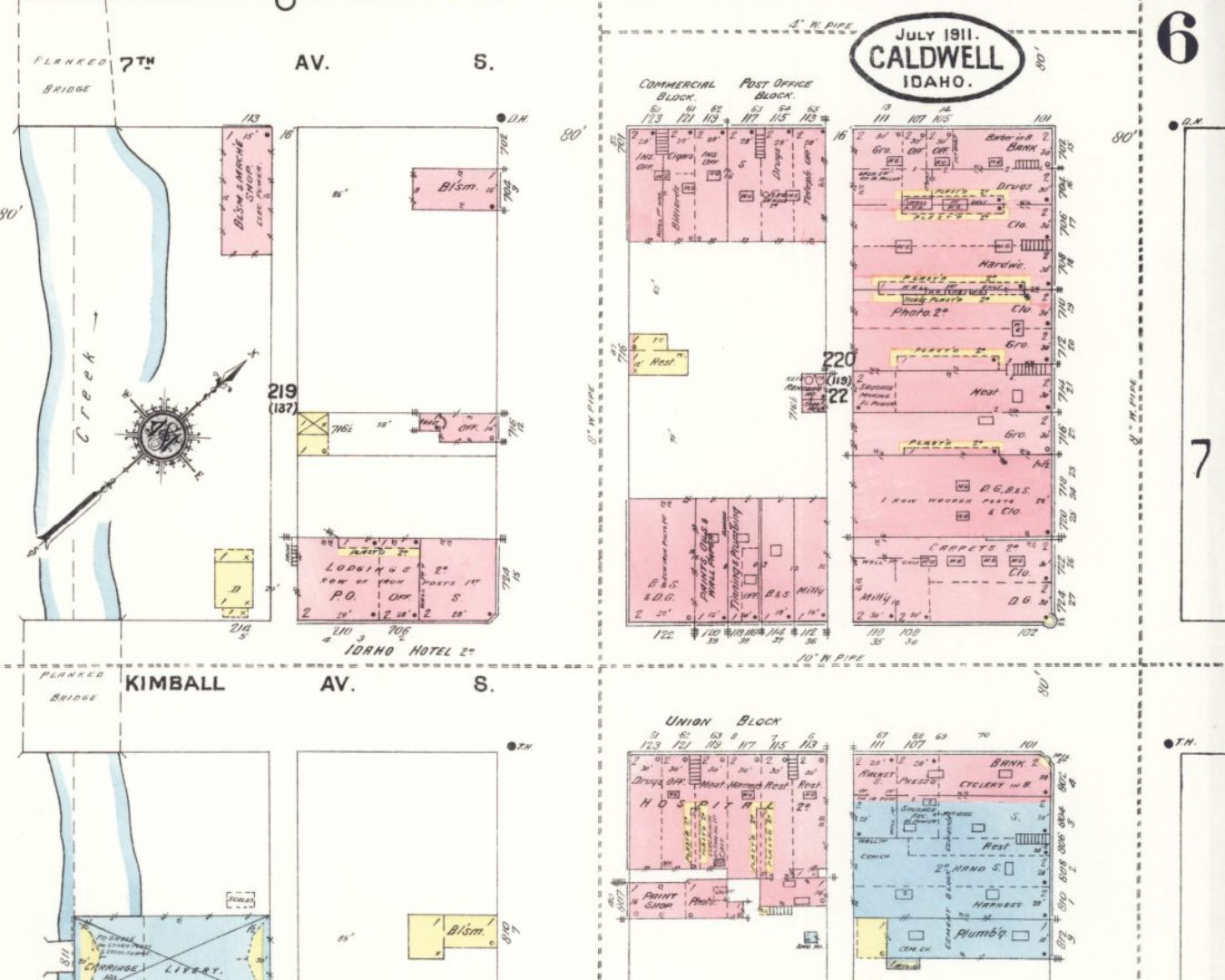
A Sanborn map of the Caldwell Historic District and vicinity in 1911.

Caldwell street names evolved from the names assigned in the original plat of 1883, and Kimball Avenue, named for Union Pacific ticket agent Thomas L. Kimball, is the only street in the Caldwell Historic District to keep its original name. In 1891 Front Street was changed to Main Street, Market Street became 1st Avenue South, and Canyon Avenue became 1st Avenue West. In 1907 an ordinance proposed by city councilor Herbert R. Cleaver reassigned 1st Avenue South as Arthur Street and 1st Avenue West as 7th Avenue. By that time, 1st Avenue West may have become known informally as Bank Street.

== See also ==
- Thomas K. Little House
- John C. Rice House
- A. K. Steunenberg House
