= Nampa and Meridian Irrigation District Office =

U.S. historic building

- U.S. National Register of Historic Places
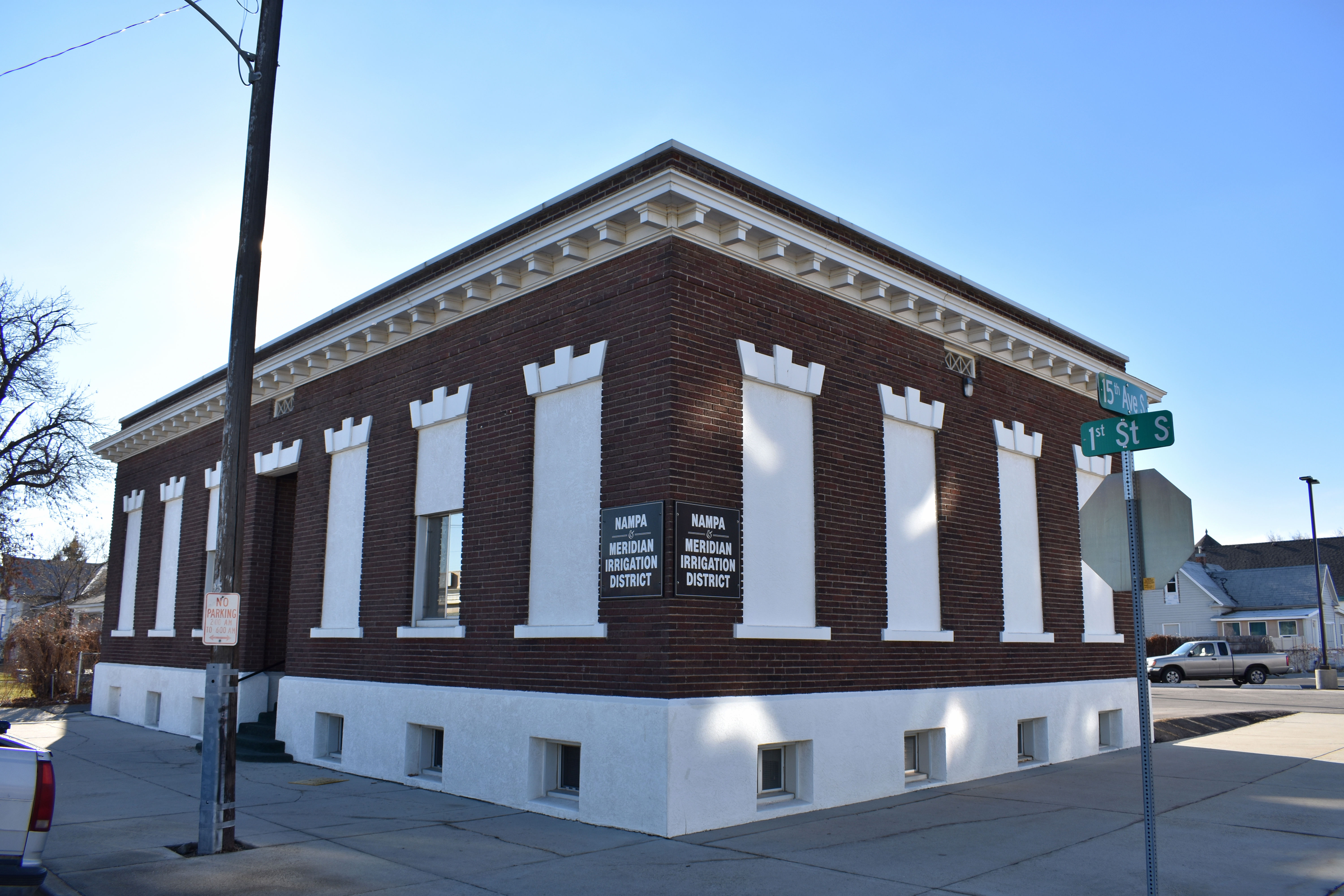
- The Nampa and Meridian Irrigation District Office in 2019

- Location within Idaho Location within the United States
- Location: 1503 1st St., S., Nampa, Idaho
- Coordinates: 43°34′35″N 116°33′20″W
- Area: less than one acre
- Built: 1919
- Architect: Tourtellotte & Hummel
- Architectural style: Classical Revival
- MPS: Tourtellotte and Hummel Architecture TR
- NRHP reference No.: 82000329
- Added to NRHP: November 17, 1982

The Nampa and Meridian Irrigation District Office in Nampa, Idaho, is a 1-story brick and concrete building designed by Tourtellotte and Hummel and completed in 1919. The building features tall, narrow window fenestrations topped by large, vertical keystones with sidestones. Most of the windows have been replaced by a flat stucco surface painted brilliant white. The site was listed on the National Register of Historic Places in 1982.

== History ==
Irrigation districts in Idaho began forming toward the end of the 19th century, and by 1903 Idaho counted four irrigation districts: Weiser in Washington County, Pioneer in Canyon County, New Sweden in Bingham County, and Oneida in Oneida County. Montpelier Irrigation District was formed in Bear Lake County later in 1903, and farmers in Meridian held meetings to establish their own irrigation district.

In 1904 the Nampa and Meridian Irrigation District was formed in Meridian by farmers in Canyon and Ada Counties, and one of the organization's first actions was to purchase and expand the Ridenbaugh Canal, begun in 1878 by William T. Ridenbaugh to irrigate a large ranch owned by his uncle, William B. Morris. By 1913 the Ridenbaugh Canal had been expanded from an original length of six miles to nearly 40 miles, and it carried water to more than 1000 customers, including over 600 farms.

Early in 1919 the district moved its headquarters from Meridian to Nampa, and offices were opened on the second floor of Nampa City Hall. (Although listed on the National Register of Historic Places, the 1910 City Hall was demolished in 1991.) After two months at City Hall, the district announced plans to build its own office in Nampa. The Nampa and Meridian Irrigation District Office became occupied in April 1920.

== See also ==
- National Register of Historic Places listings in Canyon County, Idaho
