= Carnegie Public Library (Boise, Idaho) =

- U.S. National Register of Historic Places
- U.S. Historic district – Contributing property
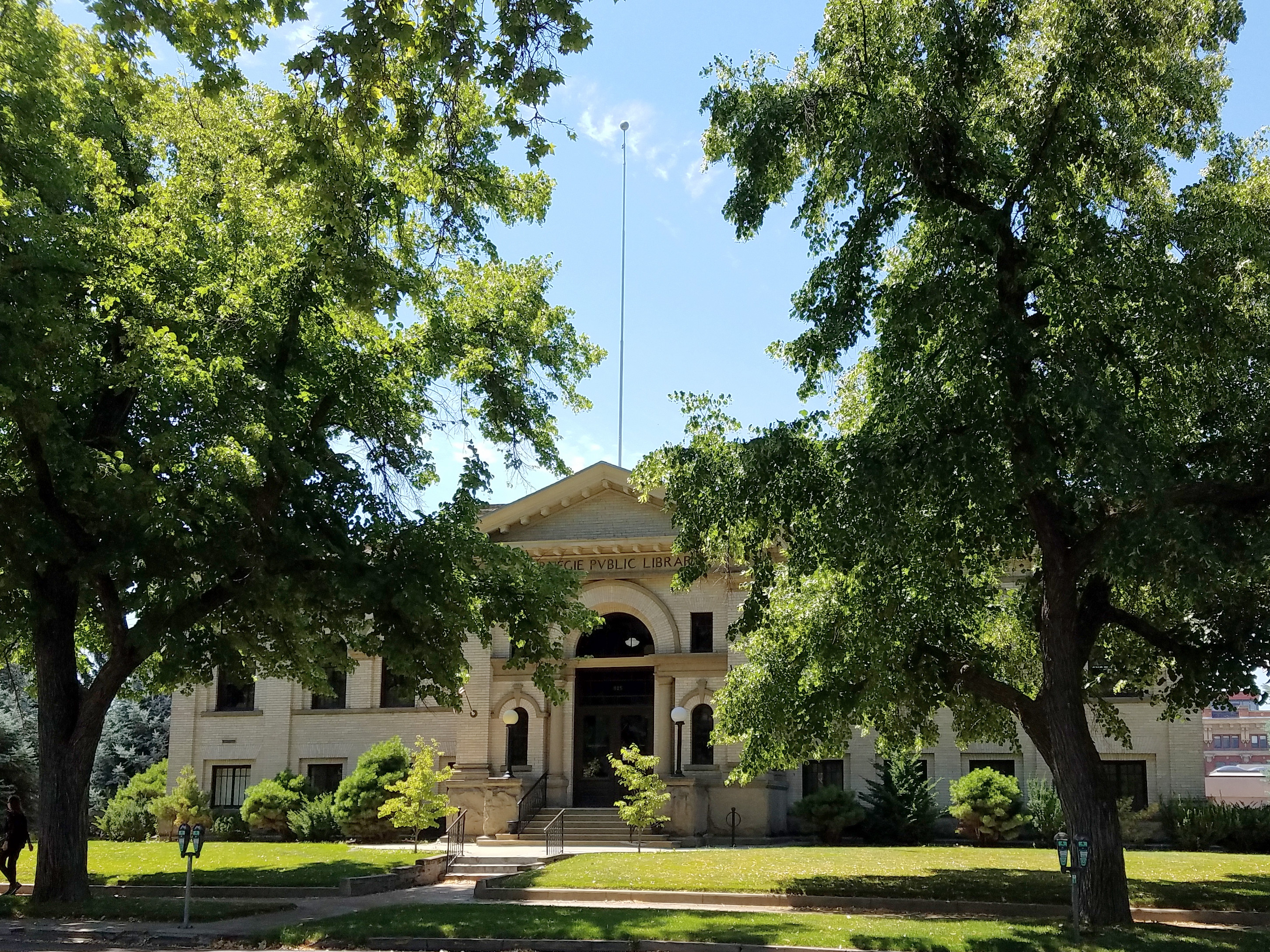
- The library in 2018

- Location within Idaho Location within the United States
- Location: 815 W. Washington St. Boise, Idaho
- Coordinates: 43°37′10″N 116°11′58″W
- Built: 1905
- Built by: Michels & Weber
- Architect: John E. Tourtellotte & Company
- Architectural style: Neoclassical
- Part of: Fort Street Historic District (ID82000199)
- NRHP reference No.: 74000725
- Added to NRHP: November 21, 1974

The Carnegie Public Library (Boise, Idaho) is a Neoclassical building designed by Tourtellotte & Co. and constructed in Boise, Idaho, in 1904–1905. It was individually listed on the National Register of Historic Places in 1974. In 1982 it was included as a contributing property in the Fort Street Historic District.

== History ==
The Boise Public Library began in 1895 when members of the Columbian Club opened a subscription library and reading room in Boise City Hall. When Boise received a grant in 1904 to build a Carnegie library, local architects John E. Tourtellotte and Charles F. Hummel won the design contract, and the local firm of Michels & Weber received the construction contract. Materials included white brick fired in Boise and sandstone from nearby Table Rock. Boise's Carnegie Library opened June 22, 1905, and Mary F. Wood became its first librarian.

In 1973 the Boise Public Library moved to a larger building, formerly occupied by Salt Lake Hardware, at 715 S. Capitol Blvd., and in 1974 the Carnegie Library was added to the National Register of Historic Places.

The building was occupied by a law firm until 2018 when it was repurposed for artists as studio space.

== See also ==
- List of Carnegie libraries in Idaho
- Carnegie Public Library, located in Huntington, West Virginia
