= John Campbell Rice =

American judge (1864–1937)

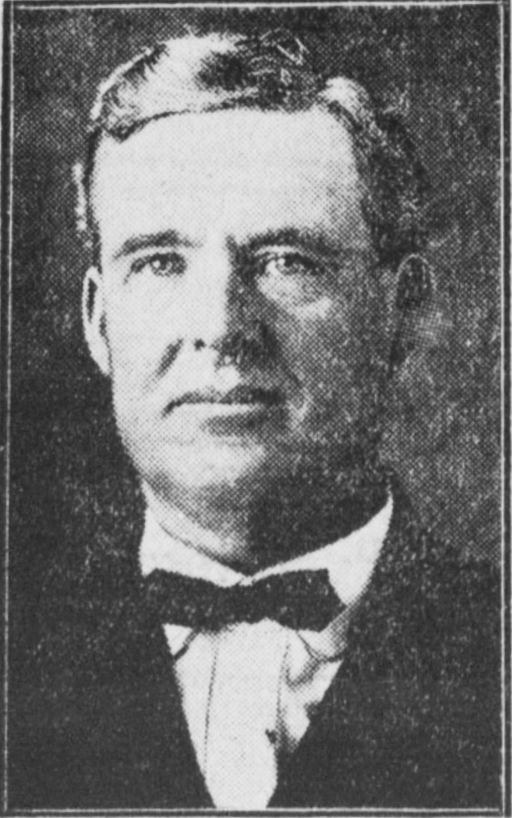

Chief Justice of the Idaho Supreme Court
- In office 1922–1923

Justice of the Idaho Supreme Court
- In office 1917–1923
- Preceded by: Isaac N. Sullivan
- Succeeded by: William E. Lee

Idaho 7th Judicial District judge
- In office 1931–1937

Personal details
- Born: January 27, 1864 Cass County, Illinois U.S.
- Died: November 7, 1937 (aged 73) Caldwell, Idaho
- Cause of death: Heart attack
- Resting place: Canyon Hill Cemetery, Caldwell, Idaho; 43.6882829°N 116.6765856°W
- Party: Democrat
- Spouse: Maude M. Beshears
- Children: Elbert G., Homer B., Martha Ann, Mary Lois (Robb), Josephine Eva (Polivka)
- Parents: Elbert G. Rice (father); Mary Ann Camp (mother)
- Education: Illinois College (1885) A.B., University of Michigan (1888) A.M., Cornell University (1890), LL.B.

John Campbell Rice (January 27, 1864 – November 7, 1937) was an American attorney and judge. He was a justice of the Idaho Supreme Court and served as chief justice from 1922 to 1923.

== Early life and education ==
Rice was born January 27, 1864, in Cass County, Illinois, to parents Elbert G. and Mary Ann (Camp) Rice. The eighth of eleven children, Rice attended public school in Cass County. He later attended Illinois College in Jacksonville, receiving an A.B. degree in 1885.

He taught mathematics at the college in 1886, and earned an A.M. degree from the University of Michigan at Ann Arbor in 1888. In 1890, Rice received an LL.B. degree from Cornell University in Ithaca, New York.

== Career ==
By 1891. Rice had moved west to Caldwell, Idaho, and entered into law practice with a Cornell University classmate, John T. Morrison. In 1892, Rice helped to organize the College of Idaho, teaching classes and serving as a trustee, and helped to organize the Caldwell Commercial Bank in 1894, and he served as bank president. He served in the Idaho Legislature for one two-year term, 1897 to 1899, and Rice was elected mayor of Caldwell for a one-year term in 1901.

Rice was elected to a six-year term on the Idaho Supreme Court in 1917. He served as chief justice 1922–1923. In 1931, Rice became a judge in Idaho's 7th Judicial District and continued in that office until his death in 1937.

== Family ==
Rice married Maude M. Beshears (October 18, 1876 – July 1, 1923) in Caldwell in 1895. The family included five children.

== Death ==
Rice died of a heart attack in 1937 at age 73 while walking home from church on November 7; he was survived by his five children.

== See also ==
- List of justices of the Idaho Supreme Court
- John C. Rice House (relocated), listed on the National Register of Historic Places
- The Rice Building (1910) is a contributing resource in the Caldwell Historic District

Legal offices
Preceded by Isaac N. Sullivan	Associate Justice of the Idaho Supreme Court; 1917–1923	Succeeded by William E. Lee
