= Odd Fellows Windmill =

Historic building in NYC

Coordinates: 40°42′17″N 73°45′44.5″W

The Odd Fellows Windmill was a residential home for the Odd Fellows fraternal society in the Hollis neighborhood of Queens, New York (now part of New York City).

== History ==
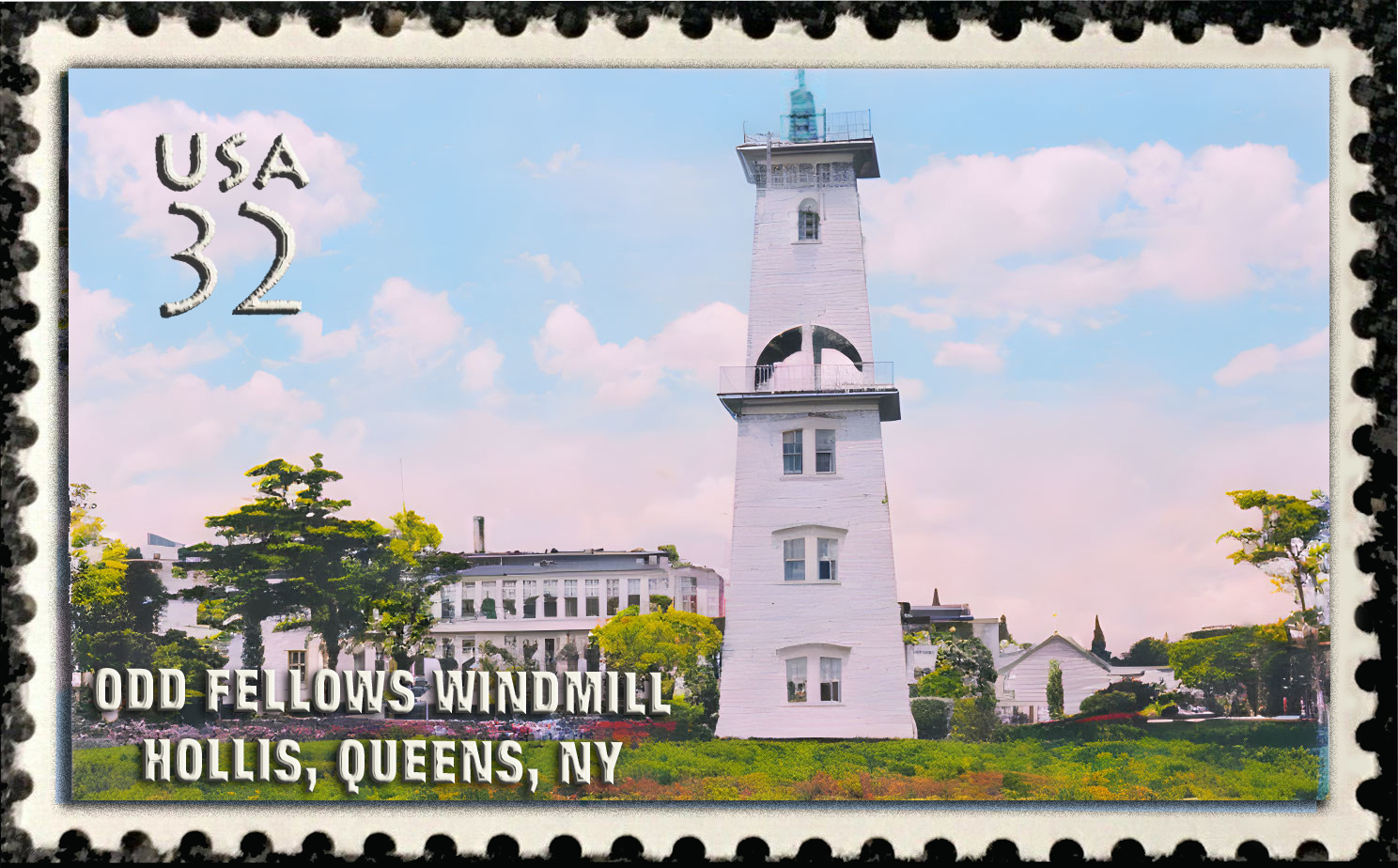
Odd Fellows Windmill of Hollis, NY

In 1882 a number of Odd Fellows of Brooklyn, New York, proposed that a home for aged members and their wives or widows be built on Long Island. By 1891, twenty-six lodges organized and a site was selected at Hollis, Queens. The Long Island I.O.O.F. Home Association began constructing the compound which included the windmill and the dedication was held on June 7, 1892. Eleven acres were purchased from H.P. Berger on South Street, between Farmers Boulevard and Hollis Avenue. A parade of craftsmen and well wishers 5,000 strong were in the line of march from Jamaica to Hollis. Over a 1,000 fraternal brethren arrived for the days festivities. There were over 8,000 English speaking Odd Fellows on Long Island at the time.

The association president, Francie E. Pouch of the Magnolia lodge read his remarks to the crowd, as did leaders of the Artistic, Crusaders, Mayflower, Fidelity lodges and a marching band performed. Lodges had vied for the honor of furnishing and decorating the home. By then 37 lodges were part of the association.

== Building and windmill ==
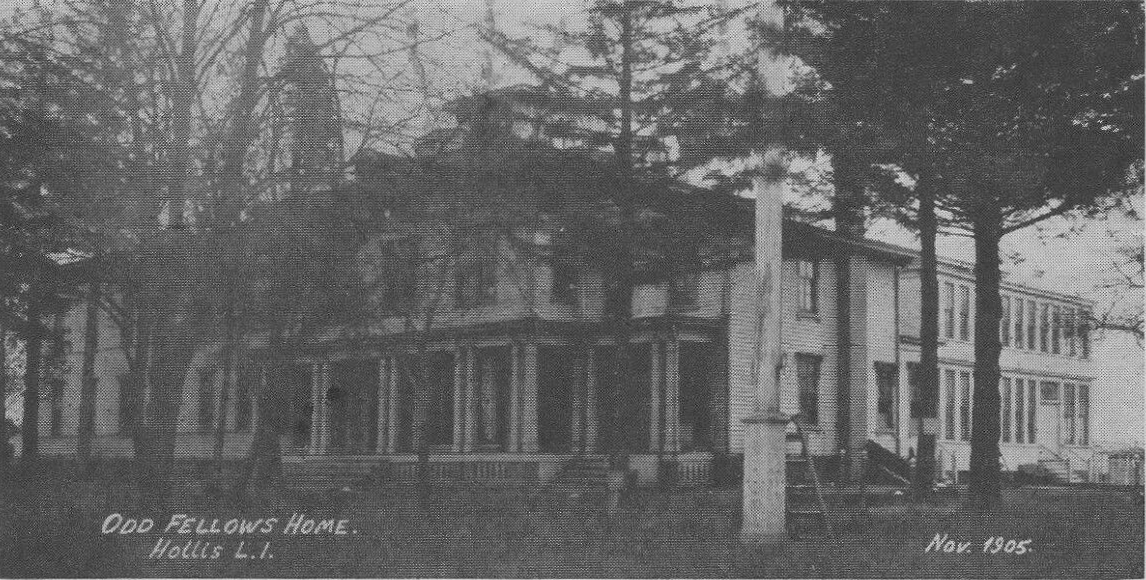
Odd Fellows Aged Home Ca.1905

The Persian horizontal windmill, the first practical windmill.

As first constructed on a plateau surrounded by a farm, the home had 18 rooms and a barn which opened in May 1892. However, what made the Odd Fellows Home unique was its windmill. The tower windmill held two 4,000 US gallons (15,000 L; 3,300 imp gal) water tanks that supplied all the home's needs via plumbing. The windmill was a vital part of the compound's infrastructure, and it became a symbol of the Odd Fellows Home. Later, a 75 by 75 feet (23 m × 23 m) expansion was added to the home, which included a banquet hall on the first floor and more rooms on the second. The porches were screened, and there were sun parlors and smoking rooms on either side. Each parlor had a library with one designated for light reading with magazines and newspapers and the other with more intellectual books. Lodges decorated each room according to their preferences, resulting in an eclectic mix of styles.

The windmill utilized a horizontal windpump of the kind patented in 1854 by Daniel Halladay, the vanes were probably constructed of metal and resembled a pinwheel.

The Odd Fellows Home in Hollis was the first of its kind to allow craftsmen's wives and widows to be integrated as residents, with 17 couples initially residing in the compound. The Odd Fellows Home became a vital institution, serving the community for over a century.

== 20th century ==
In 1929, a total of 47 homes for the aged, indigent odd fellows and orphans were reported across the country.

In 1938 there were 33 Odd Fellows still in residence in the home at 194-10 109th Road. By the 1950s the home had seen a drop in Odd Fellows as did many other lodges across the country. It had transitioned into an orphanage and with a rise in bureaucratic rules governing such places, the home's governing body decided to close it's orphanages. The neighborhood was predominantly white until the mid-1950s, and the orphans who lived there came from this area. However, in 1955, the region south of the railroad began experiencing an influx of African-American and Caribbean immigrants, which caused a demographic shift in the orphanage's inhabitants. Additionally, due to the phenomenon of white flight, the Odd Fellows no longer wanted to deal with the administrative challenges and decided to shut down the orphanage. Any children still in residence were transferred to other homes and the compound closed its doors.

== Demolition ==
The Jamaica Water Company was the primary supplier of water from wells to southeastern Queens and since the windmill only pumped water to its tanks, it was left in disuse and languished for many years.

In 2004 it was demolished.

== See also ==
- List of Odd Fellows buildings
- Caldwell Odd Fellow Home for the Aged
