= Jacob P. Lockman House =

- U.S. National Register of Historic Places
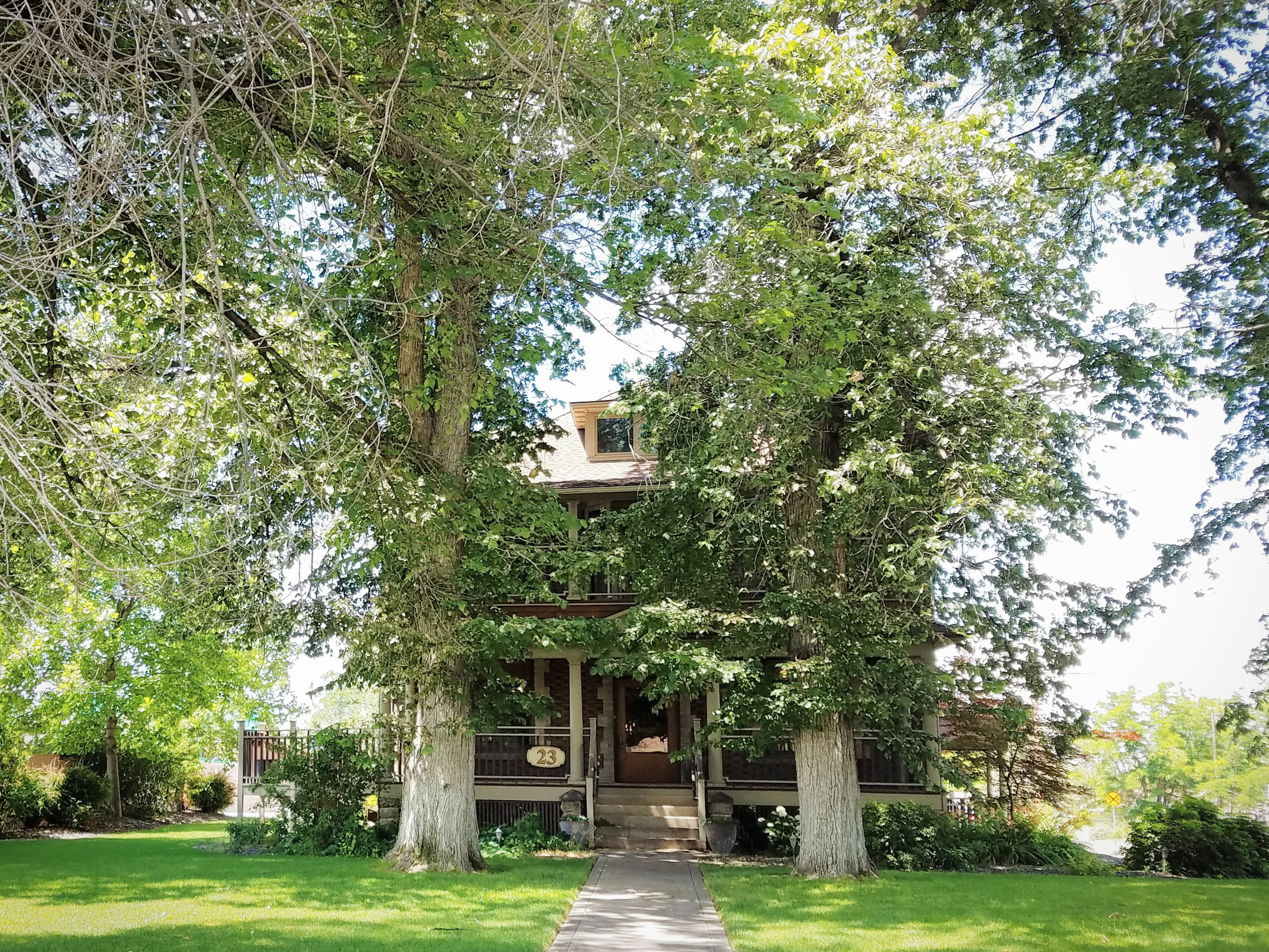
- The house in 2018

- Location within Idaho
- Location: 23 9th Avenue North, Nampa, Idaho
- Coordinates: 43°34′58″N 116°33′38″W
- Area: less than one acre
- Built: 1906
- Built by: Pat Murphy
- Architect: Bernard Barthel
- Architectural style: American Foursquare
- NRHP reference No.: 05000735
- Added to NRHP: July 27, 2005

The Jacob P. Lockman House is a historic house in Nampa, Idaho. It was built in 1906 for Jacob P. Lockman, a Danish immigrant who owned a saloon in Ketchum and served as the mayor of Wallace before opening a brewery in Nampa. The house was designed in the American Foursquare style. It has been listed on the National Register of Historic Places since July 27, 2005.
