= List of Carnegie libraries in Idaho =

Idaho Carnegie library buildings still standing

The following list of Carnegie libraries in Idaho provides detailed information on United States Carnegie libraries in Idaho, where 10 libraries were built from 10 grants (totaling over $138,000) awarded by the Carnegie Corporation of New York from 1903 to 1914. In addition, one academic lbrary was built. As of 2010, nine of these buildings were still standing, and three still operated as libraries.

== Key ==
Building still operating as a library
Building standing, but now serving another purpose
Building no longer standing
Building listed on the National Register of Historic Places
Building contributes to a historic district on the National Register of Historic Places

== Carnegie libraries ==
	Library	City or town	Image	Date granted	Grant amount	Location	Notes
1	Boise	Boise		Feb 12, 1903	$40,000	815 W. Washington St. 43°37′10″N 116°11′58″W	Completed 1905
2	Caldwell	Caldwell		Apr 3, 1912	$12,500	1101 Cleveland Blvd. 43°39′44″N 116°41′07″W	Completed 1914, now a veterans memorial hall
3	Idaho Falls	Idaho Falls		Mar 13, 1909	$15,000	200 N. Eastern Dr. 43°29′25″N 112°02′14″W	Completed 1916, now part of the Museum of Idaho
4	Lewiston	Lewiston		Mar 27, 1903	$10,000	101 5th St. 46°25′12″N 117°01′36″W	Built 1901, closed September 30, 1999, now a private school
5	Moscow	Moscow		Jun 2, 1904	$10,000	110 S. Jefferson St. 46°44′00″N 116°59′51″W	Mission Style, opened March 1906
6	Mountain Home	Mountain Home		Dec 13, 1907	$6,000	180 S. 3rd East; 43°07′57″N 115°41′29″W	Completed 1908, now a museum
7	Nampa	Nampa		January 25, 1907	$10,500	1417 Second St. South between 14th and 15th Street	Completed in February 1908. Formal opening was March 7, 1908. The library moved to the First Security Bank building in 1966. The original Carnegie building was used as the Canyon County YWCA until at least June 1976. It is said that the building burned down sometime between 1976 and 1979.
8	Pocatello	Pocatello		Nov 14, 1906	$12,000	113 S. Garfield Ave. 42°51′38″N 112°27′08″W	Completed 1907
9	Preston	Preston		Mar 11, 1914	$10,000		Demolished June 11, 2004
10	Wallace	Wallace		Jan 18, 1910	$12,000	415 River St. 47°28′28″N 115°55′31″W	Completed 1911

== Academic library ==
	Institution	Town	Image	Date granted	Grant amount	Location	Notes
1	Intermountain Institute	Weiser		1915–1917	$7,000	Paddock Ave. and Maryatt St. 44°15′48″N 116°58′34″W	Closed when the new high school and public library were constructed in the 1960s.

== See also ==
- List of libraries in the United States
