= Caldwell Odd Fellow Home for the Aged =

Historic place in Idaho, United States

- U.S. National Register of Historic Places
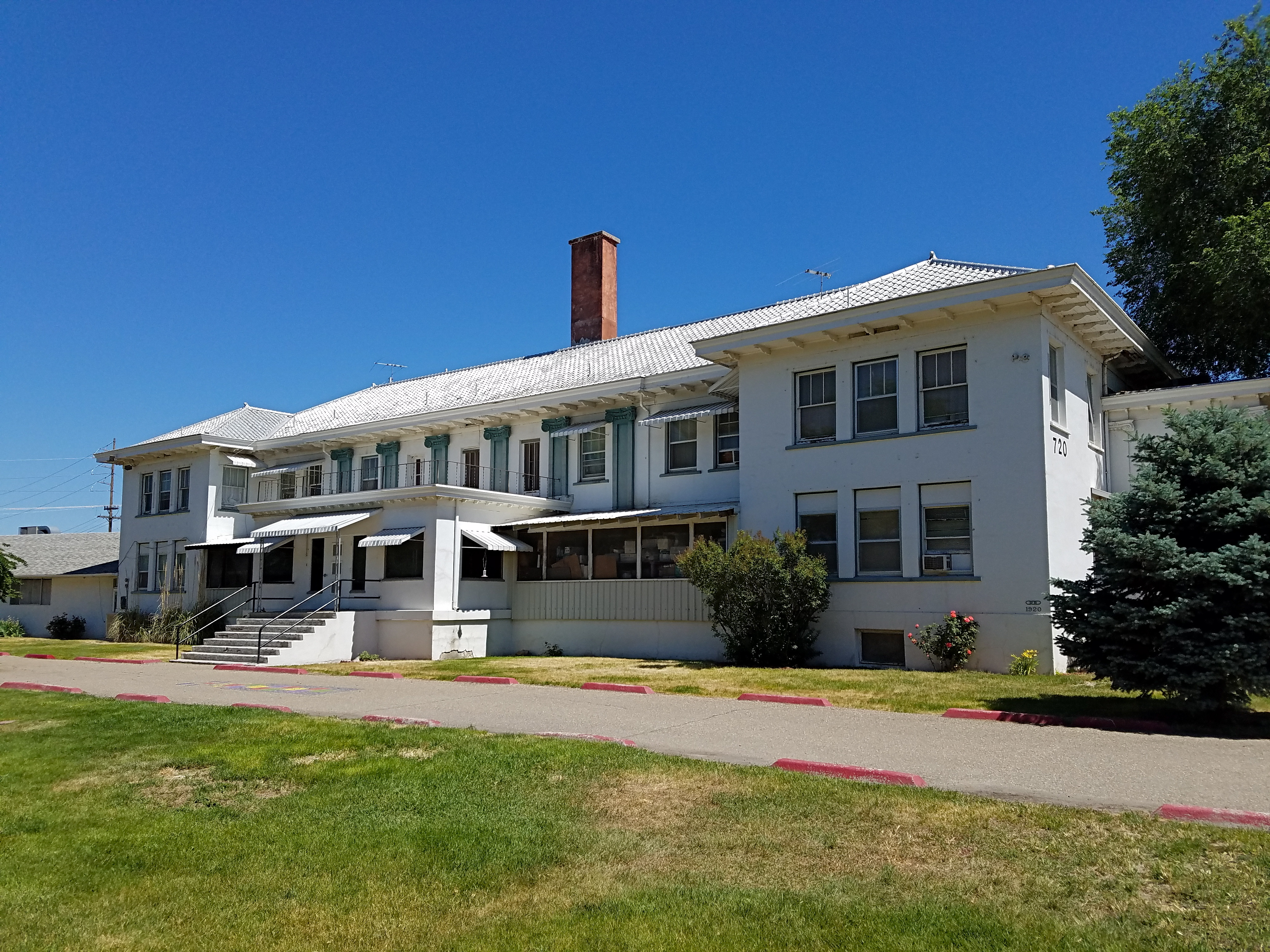
- Photographed in 2018

- Location within Idaho Location within the United States
- Location: N. 14th Ave., Caldwell, Idaho
- Coordinates: 43°39′59″N 116°40′24″W
- Area: less than one acre
- Built: 1920
- Built by: C.E. Silbaugh
- Architect: Tourtellotte & Hummel
- Architectural style: Late 19th and 20th Century Revivals, Second Renaissance Revival
- MPS: Tourtellotte and Hummel Architecture TR
- NRHP reference No.: 82000322
- Added to NRHP: November 17, 1982

The Caldwell Odd Fellow Home for the Aged in Caldwell, Idaho was built in 1920. It was designed by Tourtellotte & Hummel and built by C. E. Silbaugh with aspects of Late 19th and 20th Century Revivals architecture and Second Renaissance Revival architecture. It was listed on the National Register of Historic Places in 1982.

It is a two-story stucco U-shaped building that is about 140 feet (43 m) wide and 45 feet (14 m) deep.

It was studied in a 1982 study of Tourtellotte and Hummel architecture.

The home no longer belongs to the Odd Fellows.

== See also ==
- Odd Fellows Windmill
- List of Odd Fellows buildings
- National Register of Historic Places listings in Canyon County, Idaho
