= Isaac N. Sullivan =

American judge (1848–1938)

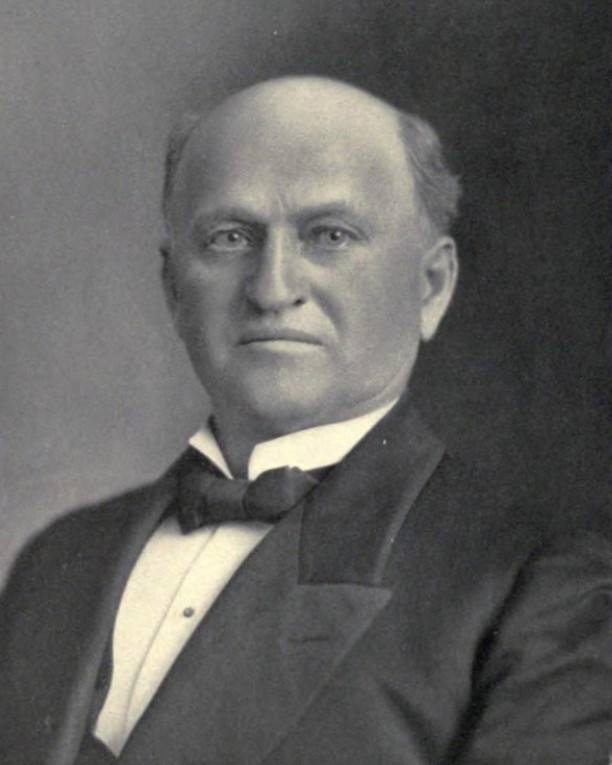

Associate Justice of the Idaho Supreme Court Chief Justice of the Idaho Supreme Court
- In office 1891–1917
- Succeeded by: John Campbell Rice

Personal details
- Born: November 3, 1848 Delaware County, Iowa U.S.
- Died: January 31, 1938 (aged 89) Boise, Idaho
- Cause of death: Heart attack
- Resting place: Morris Hill Cemetery, Boise, Idaho; 43.608693°N 116.230959°W
- Party: Republican
- Spouse: Christine Josephine Moore
- Parents: Aaron Sullivan (father); Jane Lippincott (mother)
- Education: Adrian College, Michigan

Isaac N. Sullivan (November 3, 1848 – January 31, 1938) was the first chief justice of the Idaho Supreme Court, serving alternately as associate justice from 1891 until 1917.

== Early life and education ==
Sullivan was born in 1848 in Delaware County, Iowa, to parents Aaron and Jane (Lippincott) Sullivan. He was the fifth child in a family of nine children. He attended public school in Delaware County and later attended Adrian College in Michigan. From age 17 Sullivan taught school in Delaware County, and he was a school principal in Coffeyville, Kansas, 1872–1873.

== Family ==
Sullivan married Christine Josephine Moore in 1870, and the marriage produced two sons, Willis Eugene Sullivan and Laverne Latimer Sullivan. Both of the Sullivan brothers graduated from Columbian University and became attorneys, later in practice with their father in the law firm of Sullivan and Sullivan.

== Career ==
Sullivan read law with Judge J.M. Brayton in Delhi, Iowa, and he was admitted to practice law in Iowa in 1879. He moved to Idaho Territory in 1881, settling in Hailey, a community in the Wood River mining district, opening the firm of Angel & Sullivan.

Along with Joseph W. Huston and John T. Morgan, Sullivan won election to the Idaho Supreme Court in 1890, when Idaho became the 43rd state and held its first state election. Sullivan drew a two-year term, and he was appointed the first chief justice of the court. He later won reelection in 1892, 1898, 1904, and 1910. Sullivan retired from the court in 1917, replaced by John Campbell Rice. He later joined his family law practice, Sullivan & Sullivan.

== Death ==
Sullivan died in Boise of a heart attack on January 31, 1938.

== See also ==
- List of justices of the Idaho Supreme Court

Legal offices
Preceded by	Associate Justice of the Idaho Supreme Court; 1891-1917	Succeeded by John Campbell Rice
