= Map Rock Petroglyphs Historic District =

- U.S. National Register of Historic Places
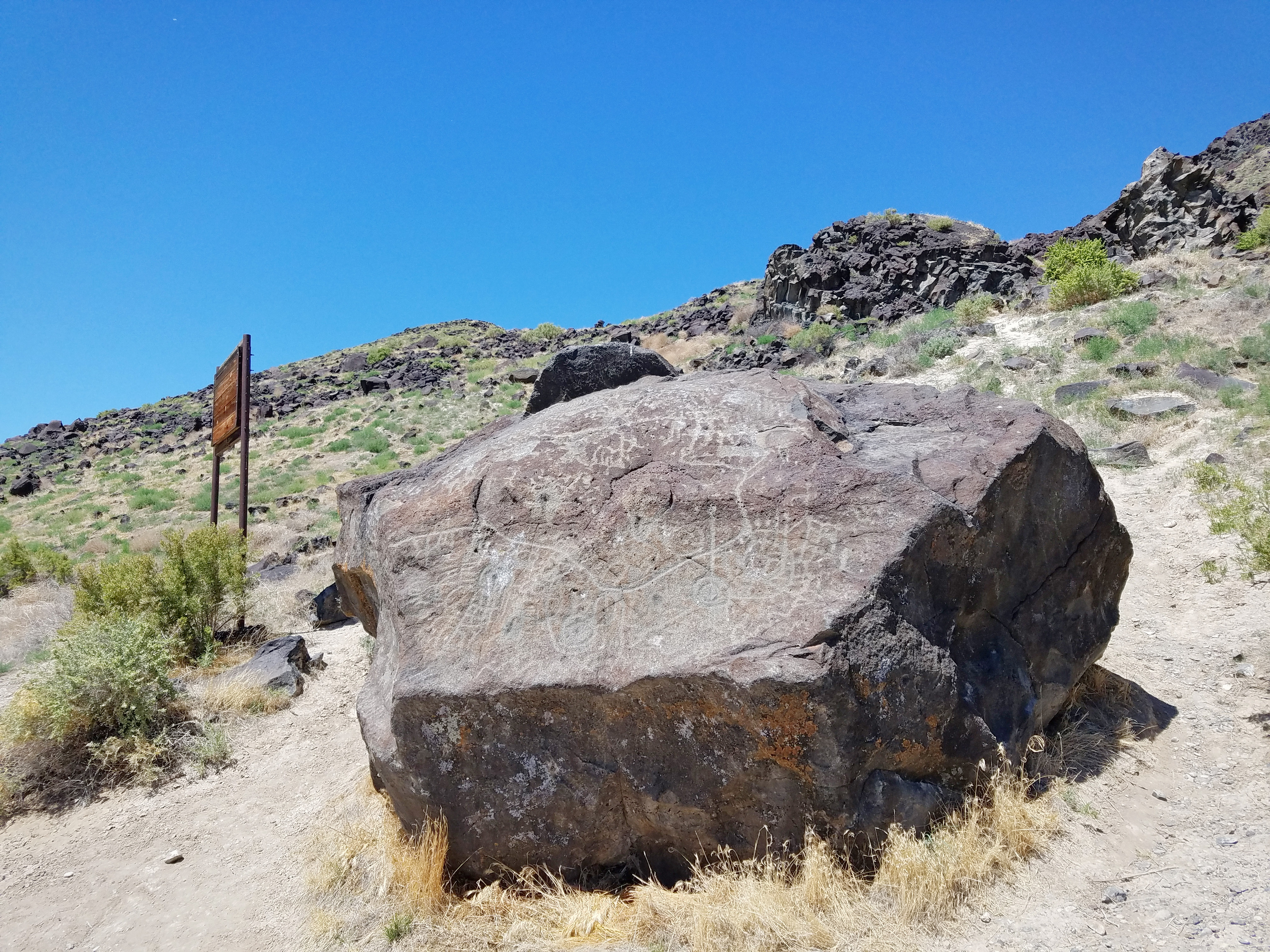
- Map Rock in 2018

- Location within Idaho Location within the United States
- Nearest city: Givens Springs, Idaho
- Coordinates: 43.4206361°N 116.7041083°W
- Area: 8 acres (3.2 ha)
- NRHP reference No.: 82000325
- Added to NRHP: November 15, 1982

Map Rock Petroglyphs Historic District in Canyon County, Idaho, is an archaeological site that includes petroglyphs believed to have been made by Northern Shoshone prior to contact with the 19th century Westward expansion of settlers in Idaho.

== Map Rock ==
The historic district is named for Map Rock, a massive basalt rock covered in petroglyphs, named by Robert Limbert in the early 1920s. Limbert believed that the rock depicts a map of the Snake River valley, and some authors have suggested that if it is a map then it may be the oldest map in the world.

In 1924 a plan emerged either to move Map Rock to Boise or to cut the rock and move pieces to Boise to become a feature of the State Capitol grounds. Although the plan soon was abandoned, the rock was found to have sustained damage.

Map Rock and the surrounding 38 acres were acquired by Canyon County in 2012.
