= F. F. Beale House =

- U.S. National Register of Historic Places
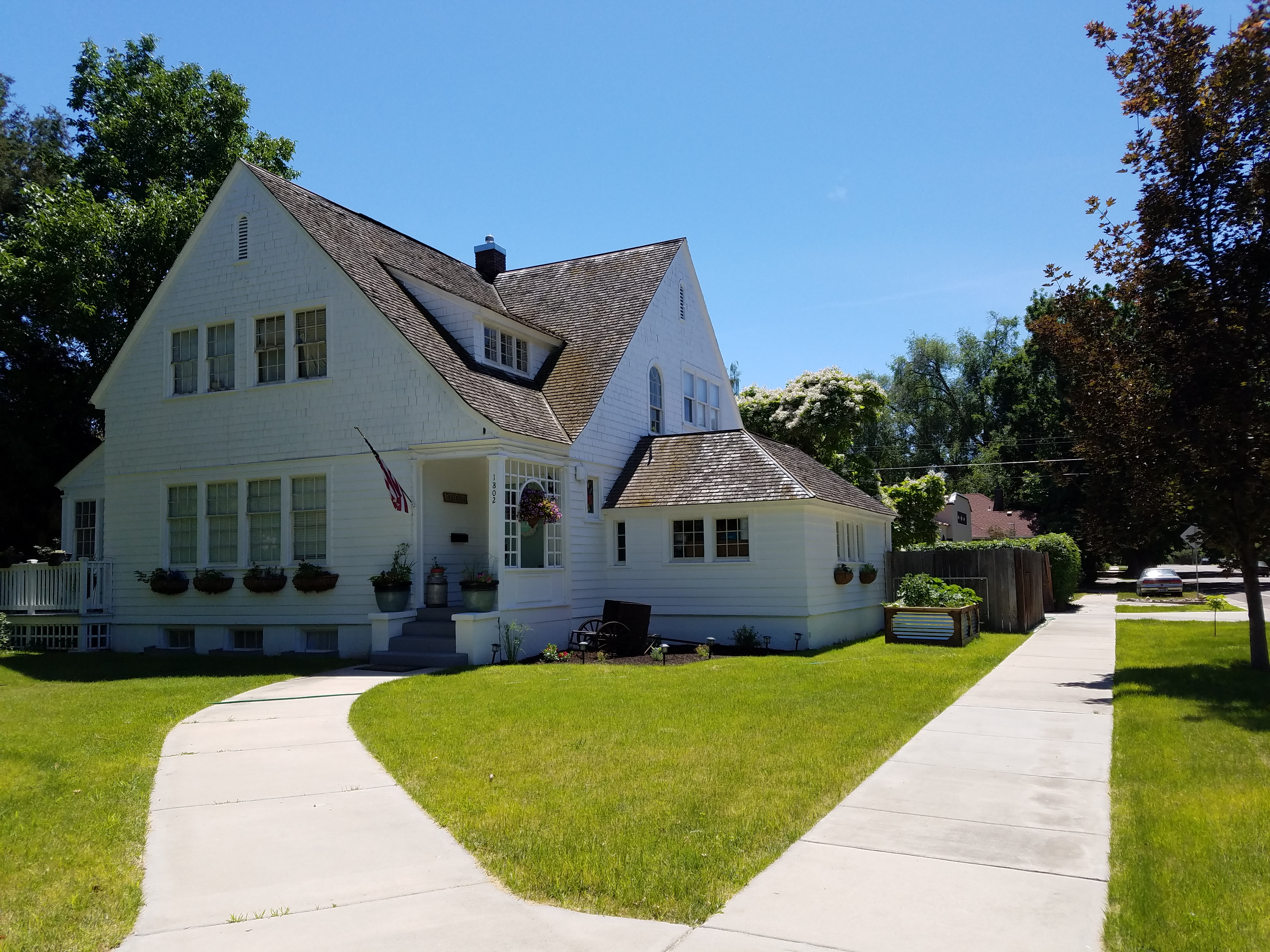
- Location: 1802 Cleveland Blvd., Caldwell, Idaho
- Built: 1923
- NRHP reference No.: 93000386
- Added to NRHP: May 14, 1993

The F. F. Beale House, at 1802 Cleveland Blvd. in Caldwell, Idaho, was built in 1923. It was listed on the National Register of Historic Places in May 1993.

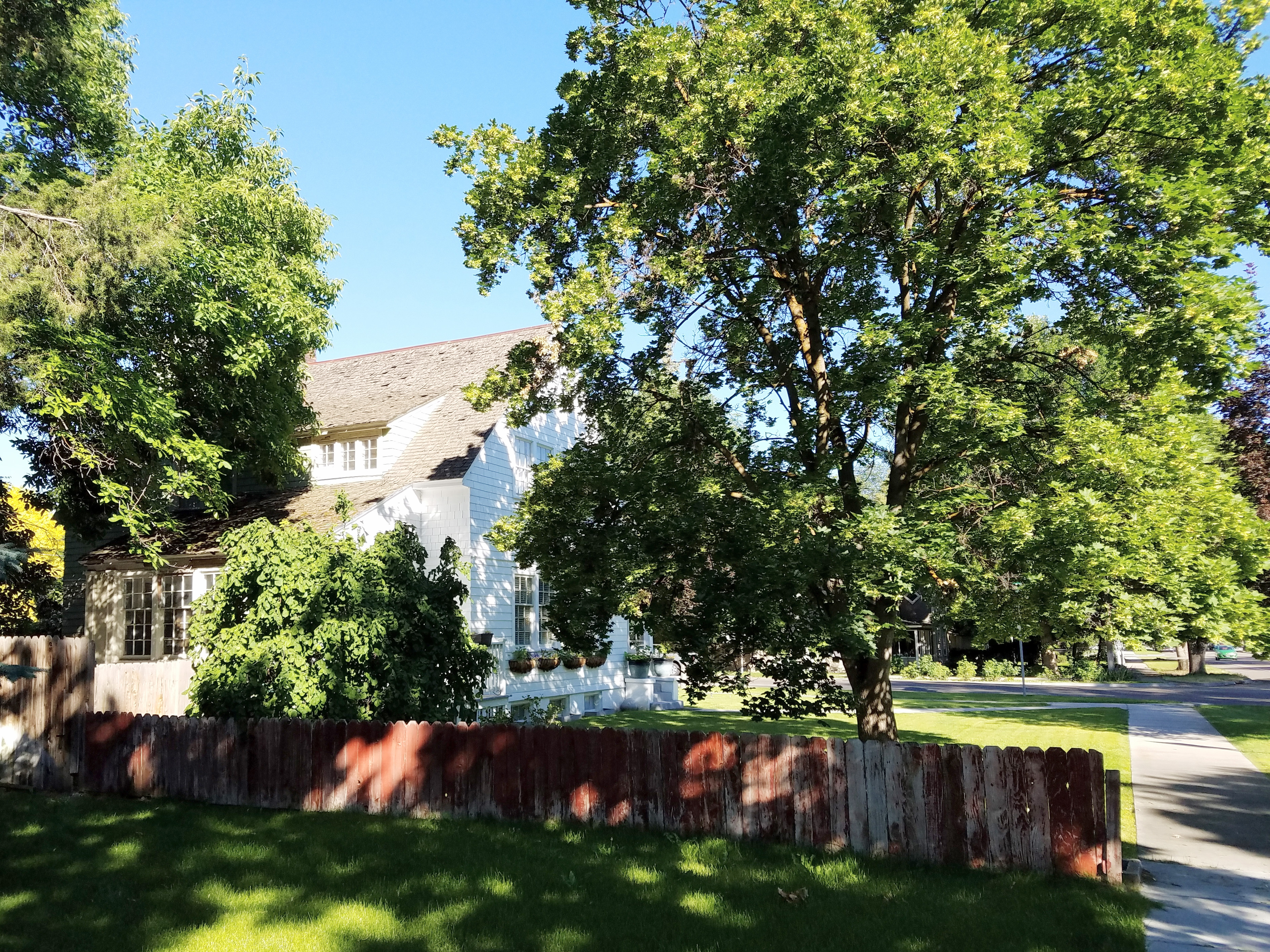
East side, with music room projecting to the left

It is significant for its association with Frederick Fleming Beale (1876-1948), music composer and professor at College of Idaho. He and his wife Mary lived in the house during 1923 to 1943.
