= Bonners Ferry Main Post Office =

- US Post Office--Bonners Ferry Main
- U.S. National Register of Historic Places
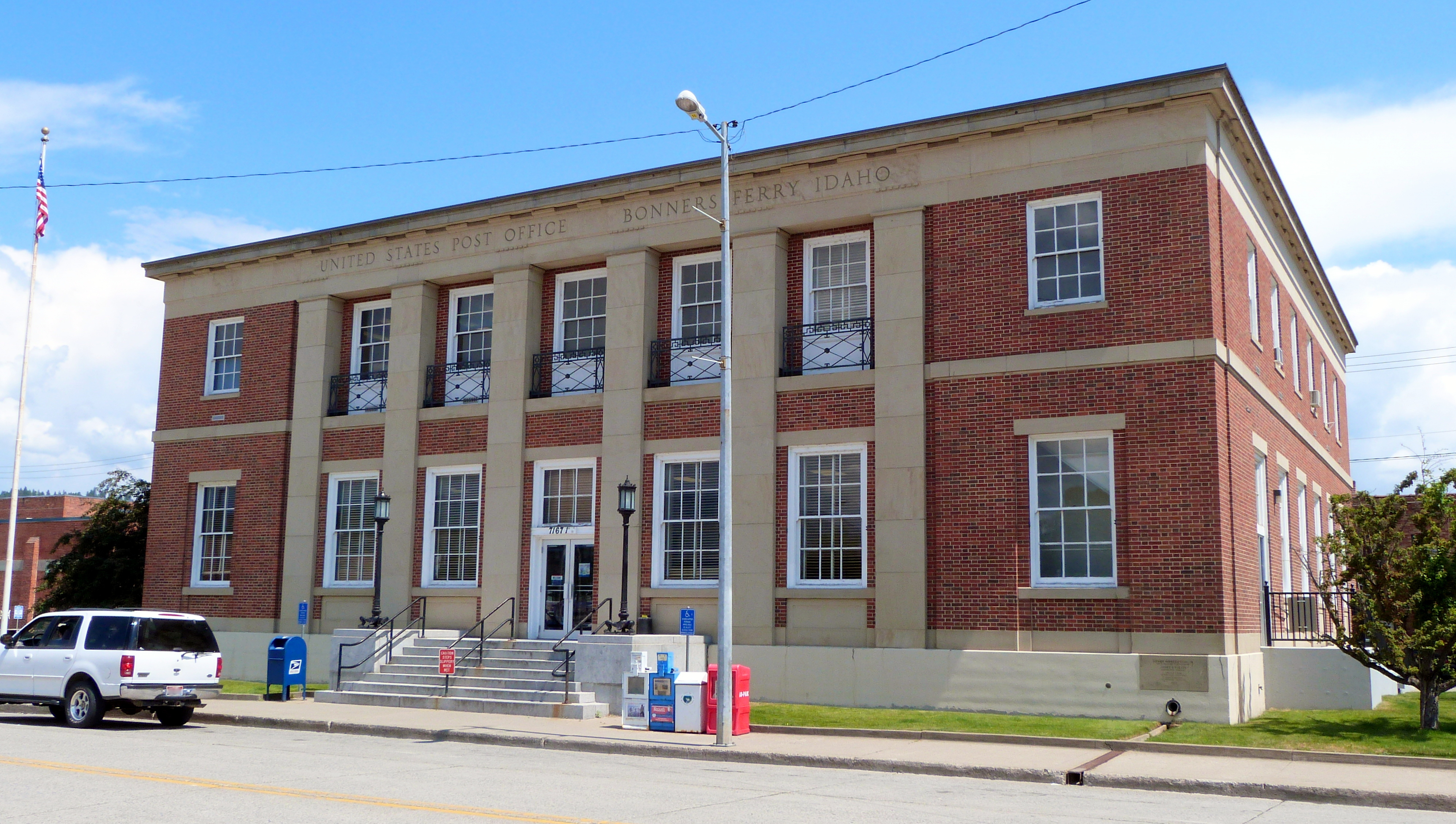

- Location within Idaho Location within the United States
- Location: 215 First, Bonners Ferry, Idaho
- Coordinates: 48°41′47″N 116°18′47″W
- Area: 0.4 acres (0.16 ha)
- Built: 1938
- Architect: Louis A. Simon
- Architectural style: Classical Revival
- MPS: US Post Offices in Idaho 1900--1941 MPS
- NRHP reference No.: 89000129
- Added to NRHP: March 16, 1989

The Bonners Ferry Main Post Office in Bonners Ferry, Idaho was built in 1938. It was listed on the National Register of Historic Places in 1989 as U.S. Post Office – Bonners Ferry Main.

Its design is credited to Louis A. Simon and it is Classical Revival in style. It is a two-story building on a raised basement.

It is located at 7167 1st St. or 215 First.?
