= Weiser Post Office =

- U.S. National Register of Historic Places
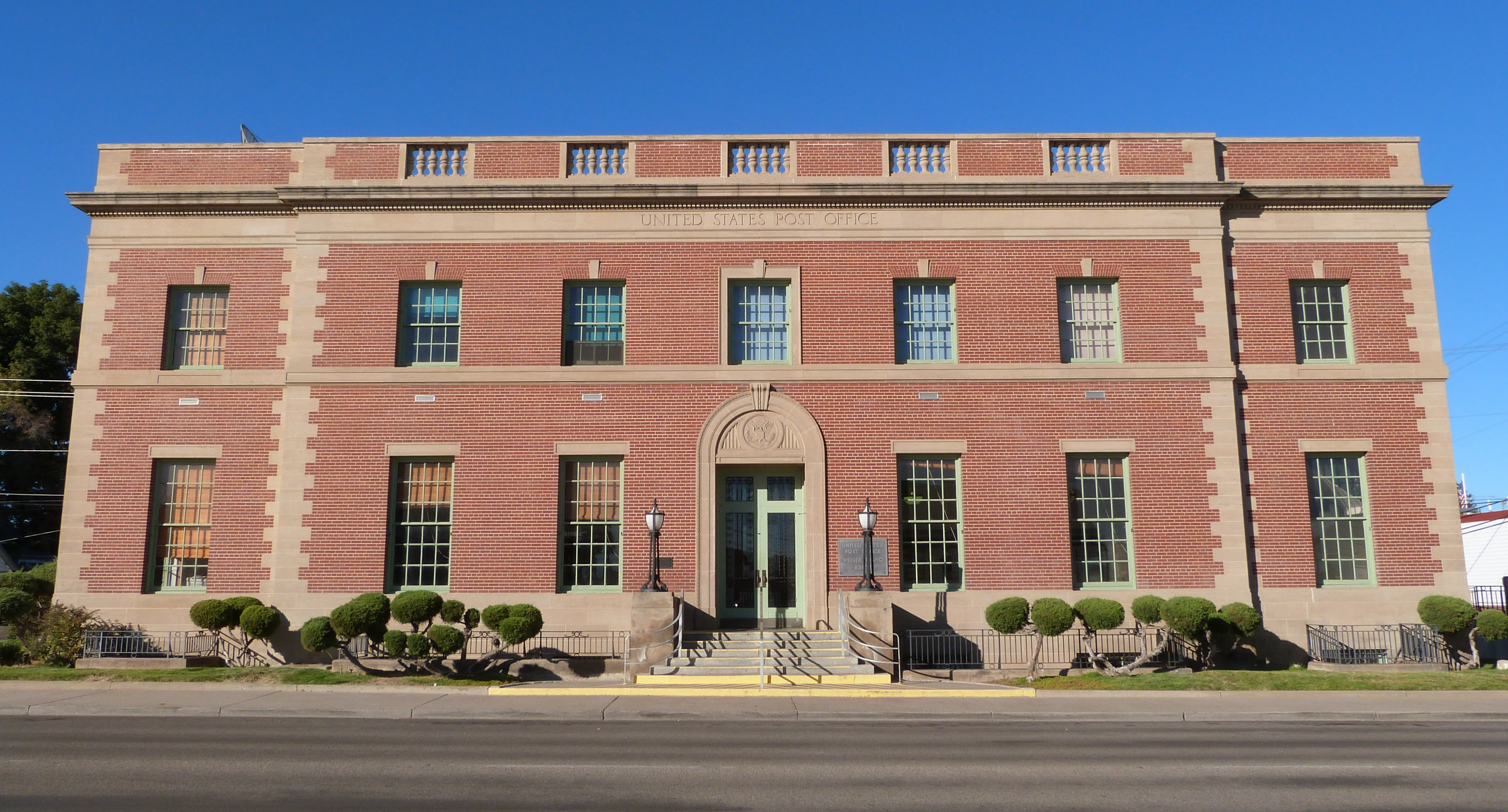

- Location within Idaho Location within the United States
- Location: Main and W. 1st Sts., Weiser, Idaho
- Coordinates: Main and W. 1st Sts. 44°14′49″N 116°58′17″W 44°14′49″N 116°58′13″W
- Area: less than one acre
- Built: 1932
- Architect: Tourtellotte & Hummel
- Architectural style: Georgian Revival
- MPS: Tourtellotte and Hummel Architecture TR
- NRHP reference No.: 82000383
- Added to NRHP: November 17, 1982

The Weiser Post Office, at Main and W. 1st Sts. in Weiser, Idaho, was built in 1932. It was listed on the National Register of Historic Places in 1982.

It was designed by architects Tourtellotte & Hummel in Georgian Revival style. Its main section is two stories tall, and it has a rear ell at the center rear. It has a flat roof behind a parapet that has sections of enclosed balustrades.
