= Nampa Department Store =

U.S. historic building

- U.S. National Register of Historic Places
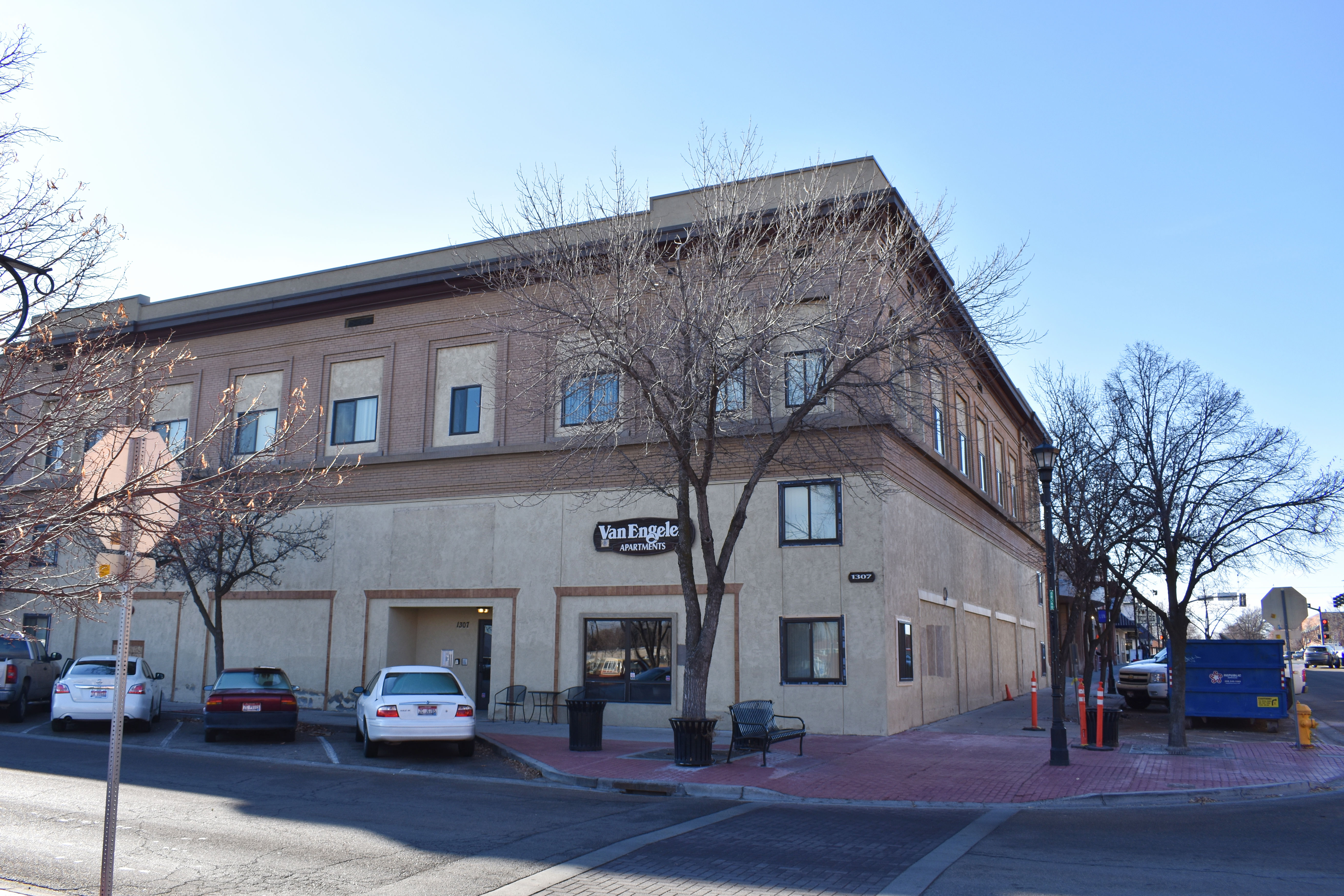
- Nampa Department Store in 2019

- Location within Idaho Location within the United States
- Location: 1st St., S. and 13th Ave., Nampa, Idaho
- Coordinates: 43°35′13″N 116°33′27″W
- Area: less than one acre
- Built: 1910
- Built by: Rush, G. H.
- Architect: Tourtellotte, John E. & Company
- MPS: Tourtellotte and Hummel Architecture TR
- NRHP reference No.: 82000327
- Added to NRHP: November 17, 1982

The Nampa Department Store in Nampa, Idaho, is a 2-story, brick and stone commercial building designed by Tourtellotte and Hummel and completed in 1910. A 3-story building for the site had been ordered by Falk Mercantile Company, but when the site was developed, Leo Falk along with investor E.H. Dewey scaled back the design and opened the Nampa Department Store, built by contractor G.H. Rush. The building was added to the National Register of Historic Places in 1982.

The store later was described as one of the most modern stores in Idaho. In 1919 the store expanded into an adjacent annex constructed by Boise contractor O.W. Allen.

== See also ==
- National Register of Historic Places listings in Canyon County, Idaho
