= Middleton Substation =

Historic building in Middleton, Idaho, USA

- U.S. National Register of Historic Places
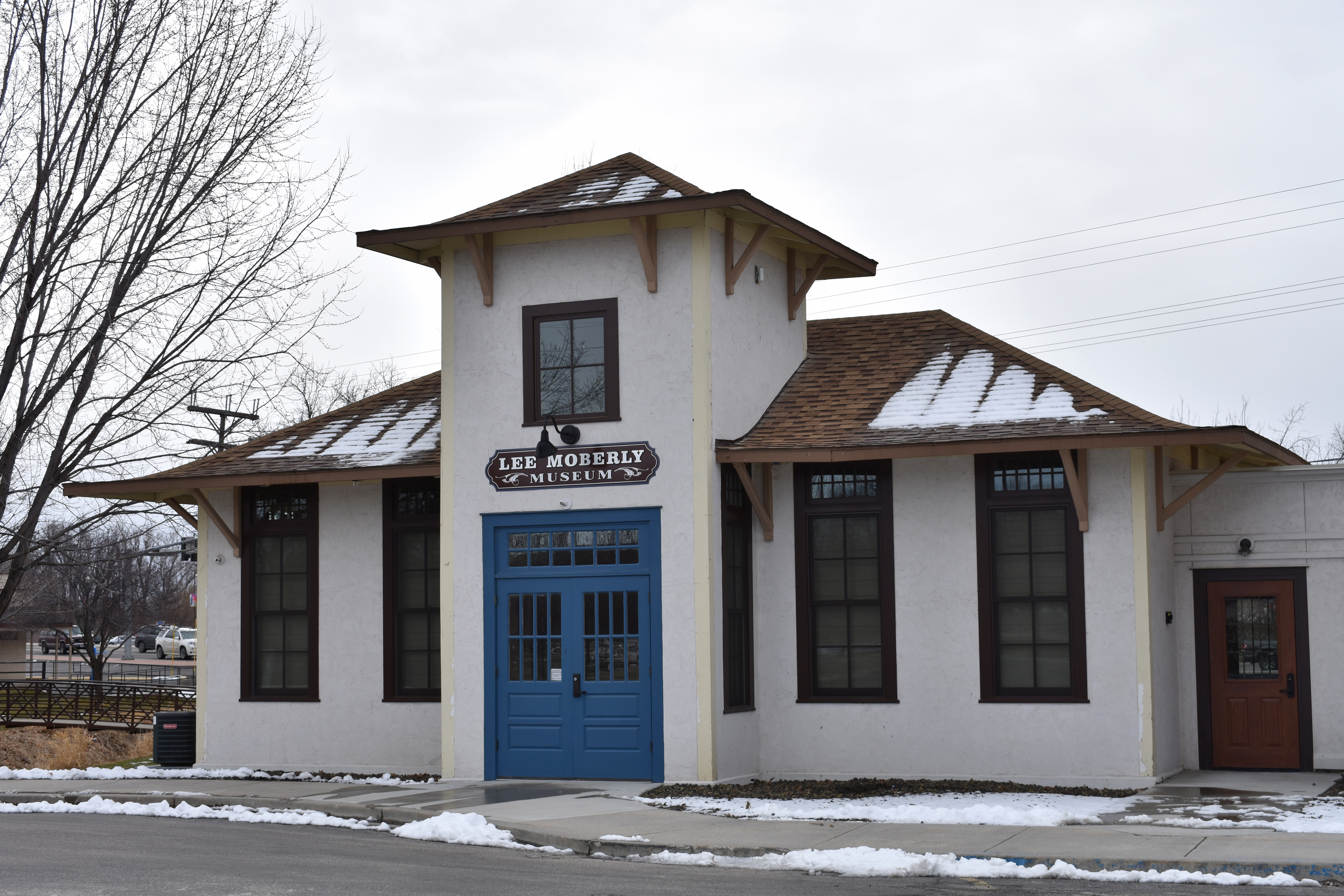
- The Middleton Substation in 2019

- Location within Idaho Location within the United States
- Location: SR 44, Middleton, Idaho
- Coordinates: 43°42′23″N 116°36′59″W
- Area: less than one acre
- Built: 1912
- Architectural style: Stick/eastlake, Italianate
- NRHP reference No.: 73000683
- Added to NRHP: May 7, 1973

The Middleton Substation is a 1-story, Italianate building in Middleton, Idaho, that was part of an interurban railway loop that connected Middleton, Boise, Nampa, and Caldwell. Constructed in 1912, the small, 16-ft by 30-ft substation provided space both for transformers and for an office. The Middleton Substation was added to the National Register of Historic Places in 1973, and its nomination included an adjacent generator building constructed in 1907 and later demolished.

The Middleton stop on the Boise & Interurban Electric Railway was completed in 1907, and the line continued to operate under control of the Idaho Traction Company in 1912, when the substation was completed.

The site is now home to the Lee Moberly Museum, named after a former Middleton postmaster and local historian.
