= United States Post Office (Nampa, Idaho) =

United States historic building

- United States Post Office - Nampa Main
- U.S. National Register of Historic Places
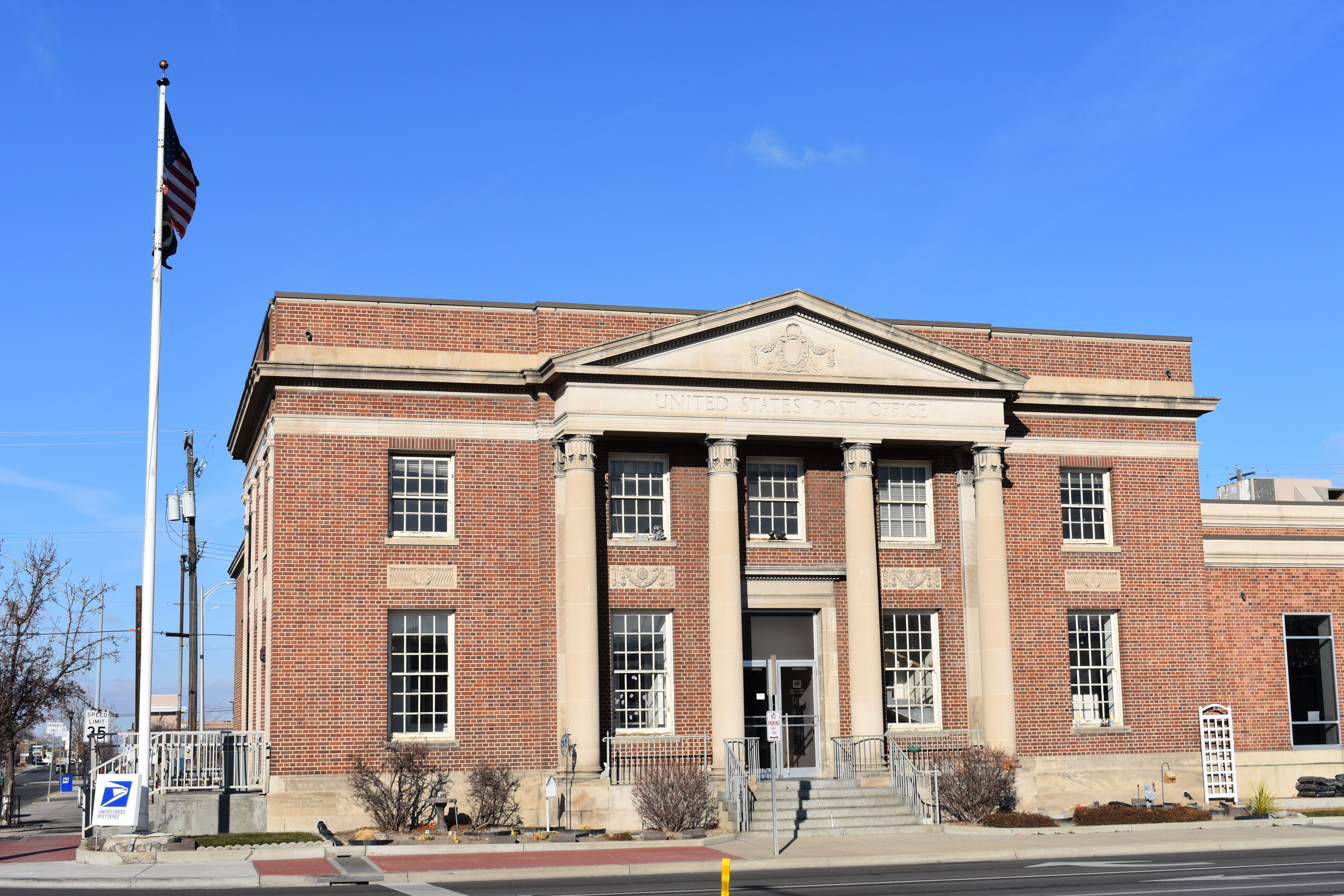
- Herbert A. Littleton Postal Station in 2019

- Location within Idaho Location within the United States
- Interactive map showing the location for U.S. Post Office-Nampa Main
- Location: 123 11th Avenue South, Nampa, Idaho
- Coordinates: 43°34′46″N 116°35′08″W
- Area: 0.8 acres (0.32 ha)
- Built: 1931
- Architect: James A. Wetmore
- Architectural style: Classical Revival
- MPS: US Post Offices in Idaho 1900--1941 MPS
- NRHP reference No.: 89000132
- Added to NRHP: March 16, 1989

The United States Post Office - Nampa Main, also known as the Herbert A. Littleton Postal Station, in Nampa, Idaho, is a two-story Neoclassical building completed in 1931. James A. Wetmore was the supervising architect. The building was added to the National Register of Historic Places in 1989.

== History ==
In 1922 the Nampa Post Office rented facilities at the First National Bank, and a permanent post office was constructed next to the bank in 1930 by Boise contractor J.O. Jordan & Sons. The building was completed June 21, 1931.

An arsonist caused fire damage to the building in 1973.

The building was named in 2009 for Nampa resident Herbert A. Littleton, a Medal of Honor recipient who died in the Korean War.
