= Henry W. and Ida Frost Dorman House =

- U.S. National Register of Historic Places
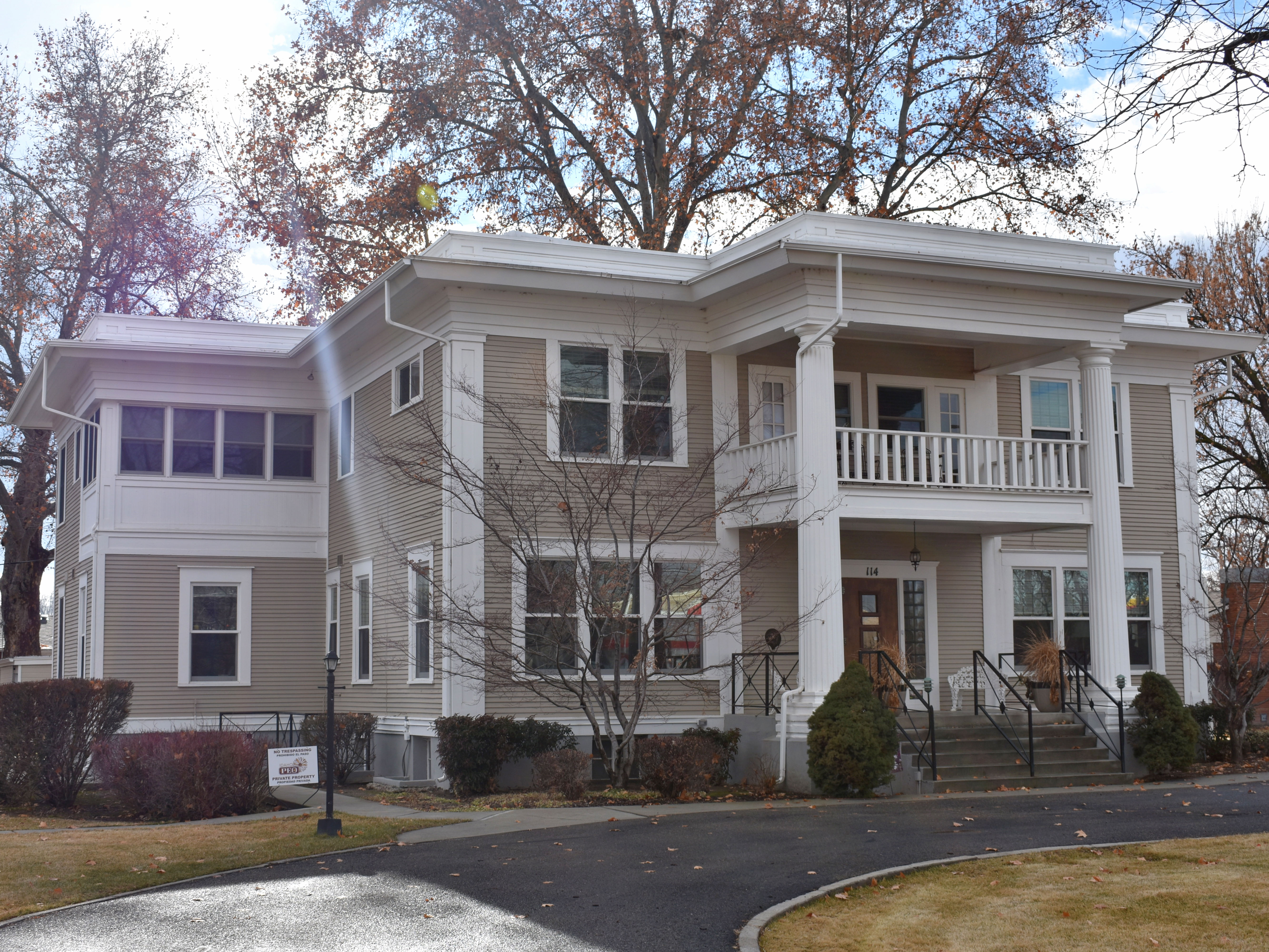
- The Dorman House in 2019

- Location within Idaho Location within the United States
- Location: 114 Logan St., Caldwell, Idaho
- Coordinates: 43°39′18″N 116°41′46″W
- Area: less than one acre
- Built: 1910
- Built by: Harding, Lem
- Architectural style: Classical Revival
- NRHP reference No.: 00000756
- Added to NRHP: July 5, 2000

The Henry W. and Ida Frost Dorman House is a 2-story, Neoclassical house in Caldwell, Idaho, designed and constructed in 1910 by local builder Lem Harding. The Dormans occupied the house from 1910 until 1919, when it was purchased by three doctors and refitted as a private hospital, the Caldwell Sanitarium. When the sanitarium closed in 1949, the house was donated to the P.E.O. Sisterhood for renovation as a "chapter house" or retirement home for members.

== Henry and Ida Dorman ==
The Dormans were active in Caldwell civic and social life. Idaho (Ida) Dorman was born in Idaho Territory in 1871 to pioneers Elijah and Matilda Frost. Henry Dorman was born in Illinois in 1865 and arrived in Idaho in 1883. His interests included mining, farming, and ranching. The Dorman Addition and Dorman Avenue in Caldwell are named for Henry Dorman. The Dormans were married in 1893.
