= Caldwell Carnegie Library (Caldwell, Idaho) =

- U.S. National Register of Historic Places
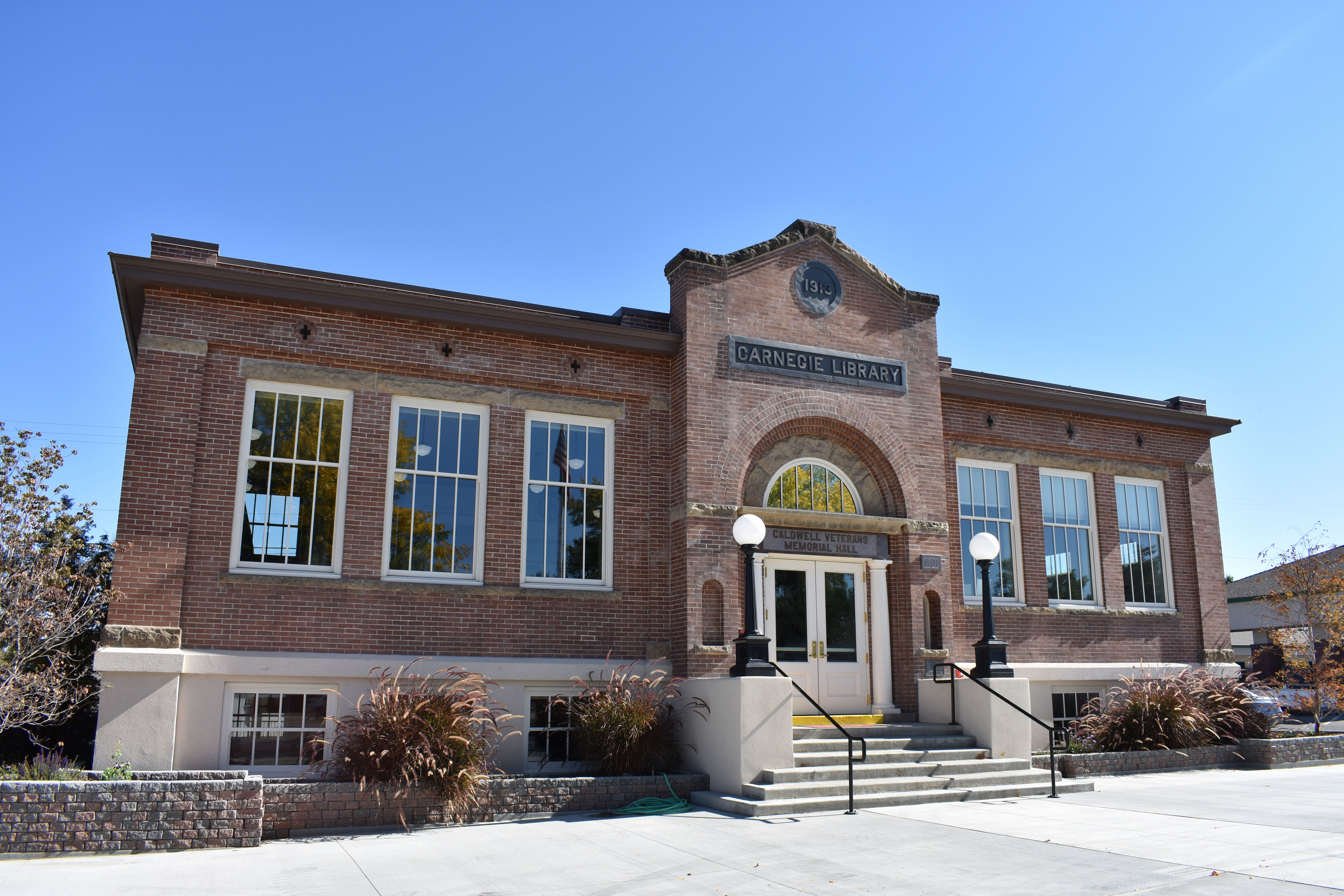
- Caldwell Carnegie Library, reopened in 2017 as Veterans Memorial Hall

- Location within Idaho Location within the United States
- Location: 1101 Cleveland Blvd., Caldwell, Idaho
- Coordinates: 43°39′44″N 116°41′07″W
- Area: less than one acre
- Built: 1913
- Architect: Charles C. Soule
- Architectural style: Renaissance
- NRHP reference No.: 79000784
- Added to NRHP: June 18, 1979

The Caldwell Carnegie Library in Caldwell, Idaho, also known as the Caldwell Veterans Memorial Hall, was constructed from a grant by the Carnegie library foundation. The building opened in 1914 and was added to the National Register of Historic Places June 18, 1979. Its modest, 1-story Renaissance design is credited to Charles Carroll Soule and features reading rooms on either side of the main entrance. The building also includes a full basement with lecture hall.

== History ==
In 1887 the Woman's Christian Temperance Union founded a private library in Caldwell, and before 1909 the city operated a public library. But in 1909 the Caldwell Commercial Club was actively promoting a new library, and Dr. W. C. Stalker, a Caldwell dentist, wrote to the Carnegie Foundation requesting a grant.

In April, 1912, Caldwell received a grant of $12,500 under the direction of James Bertram, secretary to Andrew Carnegie and supervisor of the Carnegie library grant process. By December, 1912, excavation for a new library was completed at the northeast corner of 11th Avenue and Cleveland Boulevard, although a construction contract was not signed until October, 1913.

Caldwell Carnegie Library opened May 2, 1914, with a ceremony that included an hour of orchestral music and selections by local composer Frederick F. Beale. The library operated until 1976, when it became office space for Caldwell Public Schools.

The building was remodeled in 1929 to include a portico and pediment covering the main entrance.

In 2014 the city reacquired the building, and a lease agreement was reached with the Caldwell Veterans Council. After an extensive renovation that included removal of the front portico added in 1929, the building reopened in 2017 under the name, Caldwell Veterans Memorial Hall.

== See also ==
- List of Carnegie libraries in Idaho
