= Thomas K. Little House =

- U.S. National Register of Historic Places
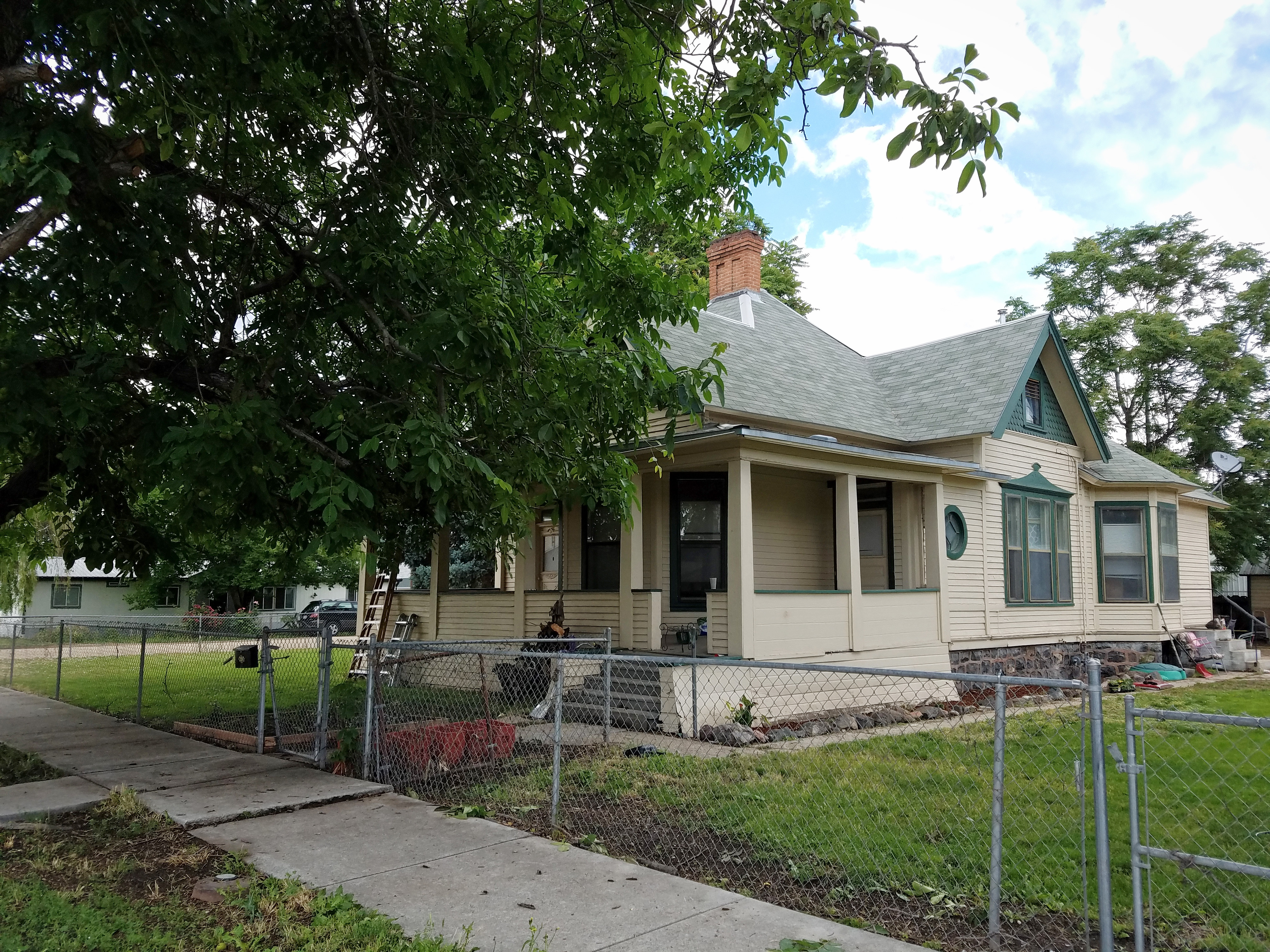
- The Thomas K. Little House in 2018

- Location within Idaho Location within the United States
- Location: 703 E. Belmont St., Caldwell, Idaho
- Coordinates: 43°40′08″N 116°41′05″W
- Area: less than one acre
- Built: 1896
- Built by: Miller, Robert E.
- Architectural style: Late Victorian, Victorian Eclectic
- NRHP reference No.: 80001295
- Added to NRHP: August 18, 1980

The Thomas K. Little House is a 1 1/2-story Queen Anne style house built for the Littles by Robert E. Miller in 1896 in Caldwell, Idaho. Added to the National Register of Historic Places in 1980, the house features an irregular pattern with small rooms constructed around two parlors, and it sits on a lava rock foundation.

Thomas K. Little was a dry goods merchant in Caldwell, and he was elected mayor of Caldwell in 1904. With the help of architect Thomas H. Soule in 1906, he remodeled the Little Block (Harmon Building) at the corner of Kimball and Main Streets, expanding the building and adding its decorative corner turret. After his retirement in 1910, Little moved from Caldwell to Boise.

== See also ==
Media related to Thomas K. Little House at Wikimedia Commons
