= U.S. Post Office – Caldwell Main =

- US Post Office--Caldwell Main
- U.S. National Register of Historic Places
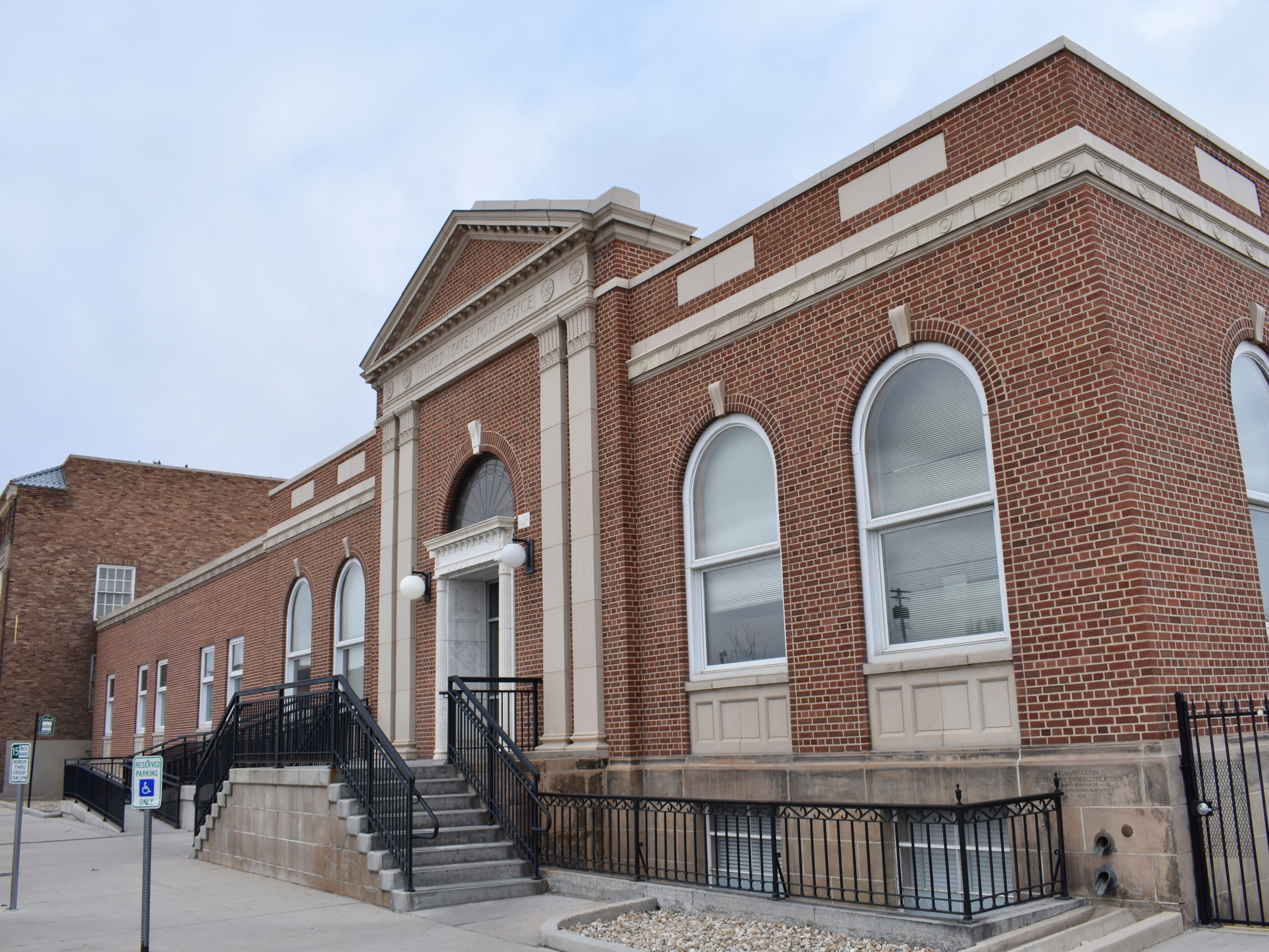
- The U.S. Post Office in 2019

- Location within Idaho Location within the United States
- Interactive map showing the location of the U.S. Post Office-Caldwell Main
- Location: 823 Arthur St., Caldwell, Idaho
- Coordinates: 43°39′55″N 116°41′09″W
- Area: less than one acre
- Built: 1932
- Built by: H.J. McNeal
- Architect: Wetmore, James A.
- Architectural style: Classical Revival
- MPS: US Post Offices in Idaho 1900--1941 MPS
- NRHP reference No.: 89000131
- Added to NRHP: March 16, 1989

The U.S. Post Office-Caldwell Main in Caldwell, Idaho, is a one-story, Classical revival building constructed of brick with a sandstone foundation and terracotta decorations. Established in 1932, the Post Office features a marble entry flanked by terracotta pilasters below a leaded glass fan window. The design is credited to James A. Wetmore, acting supervising architect for the U.S. Treasury. The building was added to the National Register of Historic Places in 1989.

The building was constructed by contractor H.J. McNeal, and original dimensions were 69 feet by 74 feet. A 66-foot lawn separated the Post Office from the adjacent Elks Temple on Arthur Street. In 1965 the building was remodeled, and the Post Office expanded to include the former lawn area.
