= Givens Hot Springs, Idaho =

Uninincorporated community in Owyhee County, Idaho, United States

- Populated place
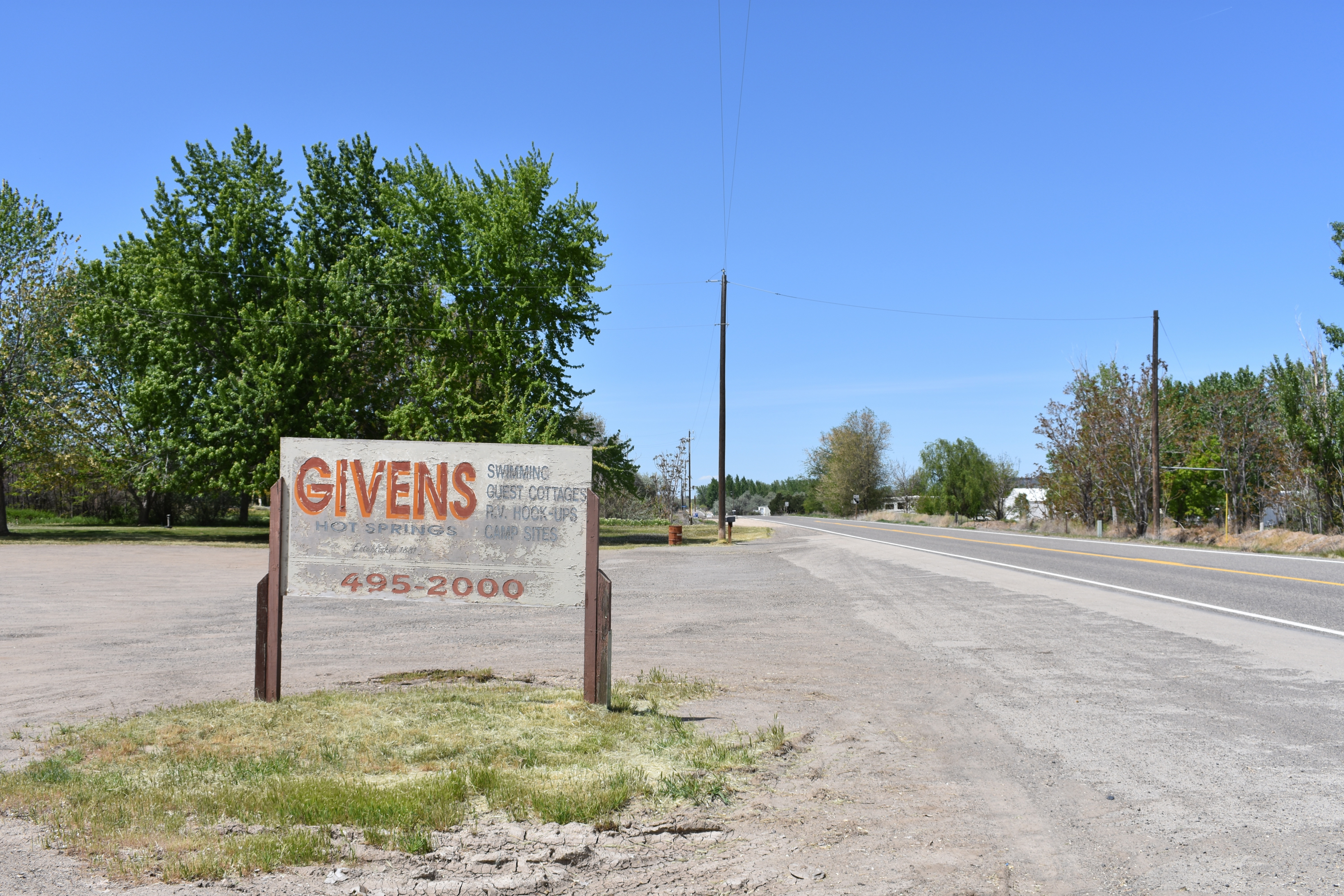
- Givens Hot Springs on Idaho State Highway 78

- Location of Givens Hot Springs in Owyhee County, Idaho.
- Coordinates: 43°25′20″N 116°42′53″W
- Country: United States
- State: Idaho
- County: Owyhee
- Elevation: 2,274 ft (693 m)
- Time zone: UTC-7 (Mountain (MST))
  - Summer (DST): UTC-6 (MDT)
- ZIP code: 83639
- Area codes: 208, 986
- FIPS code: 16-50950
- GNIS feature ID: 0396554
- Website: http://www.givenshotsprings.com/home

Givens Hot Springs is a settlement in Owyhee County, Idaho, United States, on the Snake River approximately 12 miles (19 km) southwest of Marsing and 20 miles (32 km) south of Nampa. The site is named for Milford Riggs Givens (March 17, 1850 – April 8, 1922). Also known as Enterprise, Enterprise Givens Springs, Givens Springs, and Givens Warm Springs, the site has been a popular destination for bathing and swimming since it was settled in 1879, and it became a destination for travelers on the Oregon Trail. Earlier, the site had a 5000-year history of Native American visits.

== History ==
Archaeological evidence in the form of pit houses and midden piles shows that the hot springs were used by Middle Archaic and Late Archaic period peoples. Mortars, metates were found embedded in the floors of the pit houses, as well as other artifacts such as projectile points. Large quantities of deer and rabbit bones and river mussel shells were found among the midden.

Givens Springs was a town on the south bank of the Snake River, developed and settled by Milford R. and Martha S. Givens beginning in 1879. The Givens farm helped to supply the mining town of Silver City, and Givens later sold produce in Nampa.

William H. Dewey proposed building a hotel and resort at Givens Hot Springs in 1900, and a hotel eventually was constructed in 1903 by Gustavus F. Yanke, second husband of Martha (Mattie) Givens. Yanke also built a natatorium at the site. A school was built in 1907.

Bramlett & Suell opened a saloon at the resort in 1906, and in 1911 Charles Simmons leased the hotel, baths, and livery barn.

The hotel at Givens Hot Springs was destroyed by fire in 1939 and was not rebuilt.

In 1904 The Caldwell Tribune said of the site, "The Givens hot springs was established as a resort for invalids in 1882 by M.R. Givens, now deceased, but only in recent years it has become a wide known fact that the waters of these springs contains the properties which is almost an absolute cure for rheumatism and such diseases. The temperature of the water at the springs is 175 degrees and contains a large amount of ammonia, potash and borax besides other properties."
