= John C. Rice House =

- U.S. National Register of Historic Places
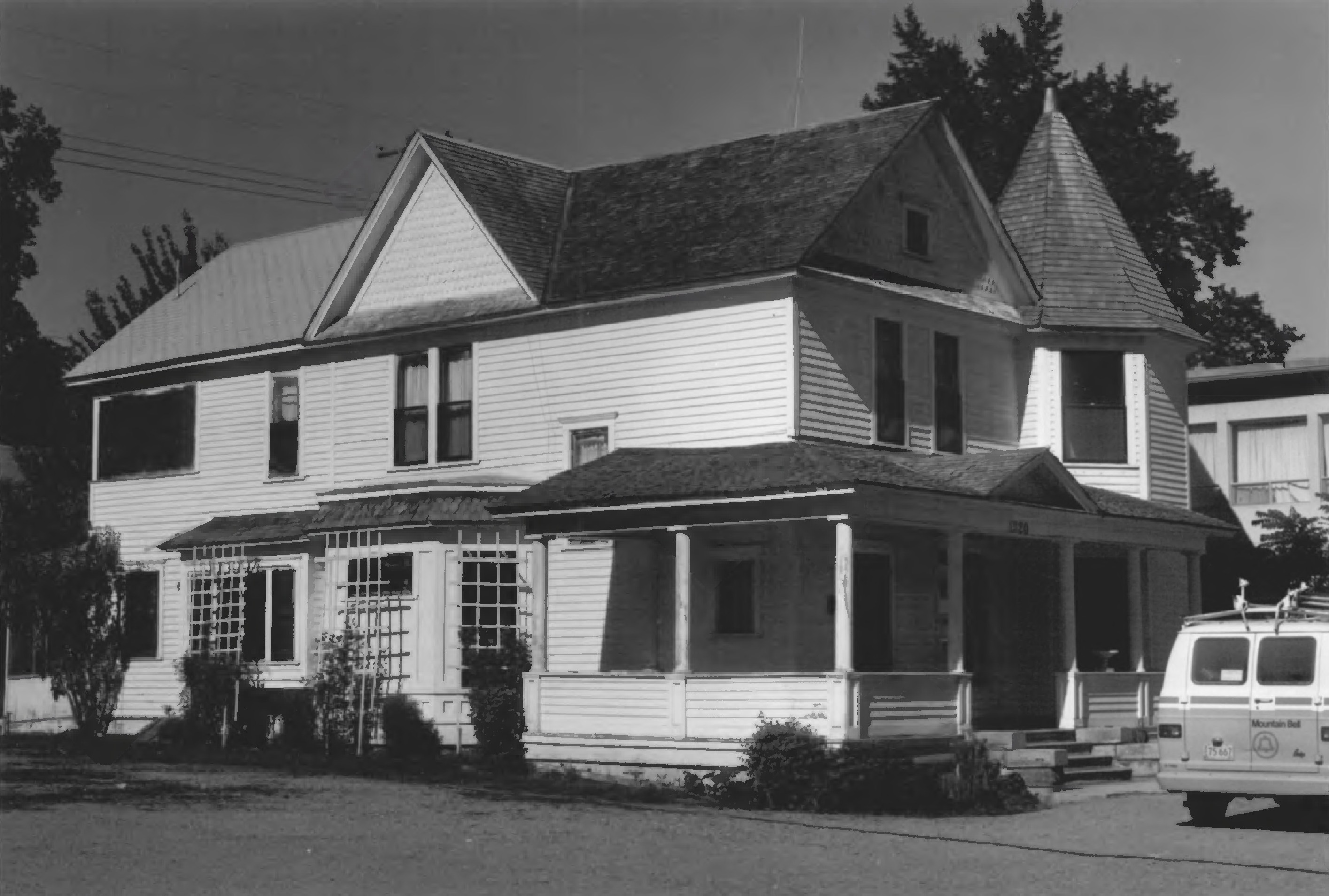
- The John C. Rice House in 1979

- Location within Idaho Location within the United States
- Location: 1520 Cleveland Blvd., Caldwell, Idaho
- Coordinates: 43°39′31″N 116°40′52″W
- Area: less than one acre
- Built: 1896
- Architectural style: Queen Anne
- NRHP reference No.: 80001296
- Added to NRHP: May 27, 1980

The John C. Rice House is a 2-story, Queen Anne style house constructed in 1896 in the Washington Heights neighborhood, afterwards relocated to 2121 College Ave> of Caldwell, Idaho. The house features an octagonal turret at the south end of a wraparound porch, a gable roof, and (originally) a lava rock foundation. In 1904 a cement sidewalk was constructed from the Rice House to downtown Caldwell, a distance of approximately 16 blocks.

The house was listed on the National Register of Historic Places (NRHP) May 27, 1980, and would have been part of the Steunenberg Residential Historic District, established in 2002, but it was relocated and substantially altered sometime after its listing on the NRHP.

== John C. Rice ==
John C. Rice (January 27, 1864—November 7, 1937) served as a judge on the Idaho Supreme Court 1917-1923 and was chief justice 1920–1922. Rice graduated with a law degree from Cornell University in 1890 and moved to Caldwell. In 1890 he formed a law partnership with John T. Morrison that lasted until 1894, the year Rice helped to found the Caldwell Commercial Bank. He later became president of the bank and continued as president after the bank was reorganized as the Caldwell Banking and Trust Co. Rice was a trustee of the College of Idaho, and when the college was founded in 1891 he donated two hours daily to college teaching.

== Presley F. Horne ==
In 1919 Presley F. Horne (January 27, 1882—December 7, 1957) purchased the John C. Rice House and owned the house until 1956. He then deeded the property to the Southern Baptist Church. Horne had worked at the United States Land Office in Hailey, Idaho, and had been a cashier both at the Commercial and Savings Bank in Hailey and then at the Bank of Idaho in Boise. Horne later was Grand Secretary of the Independent Order of Odd Fellows of Idaho.
