= Farmers and Merchants Bank (Nampa, Idaho) =

- U.S. National Register of Historic Places
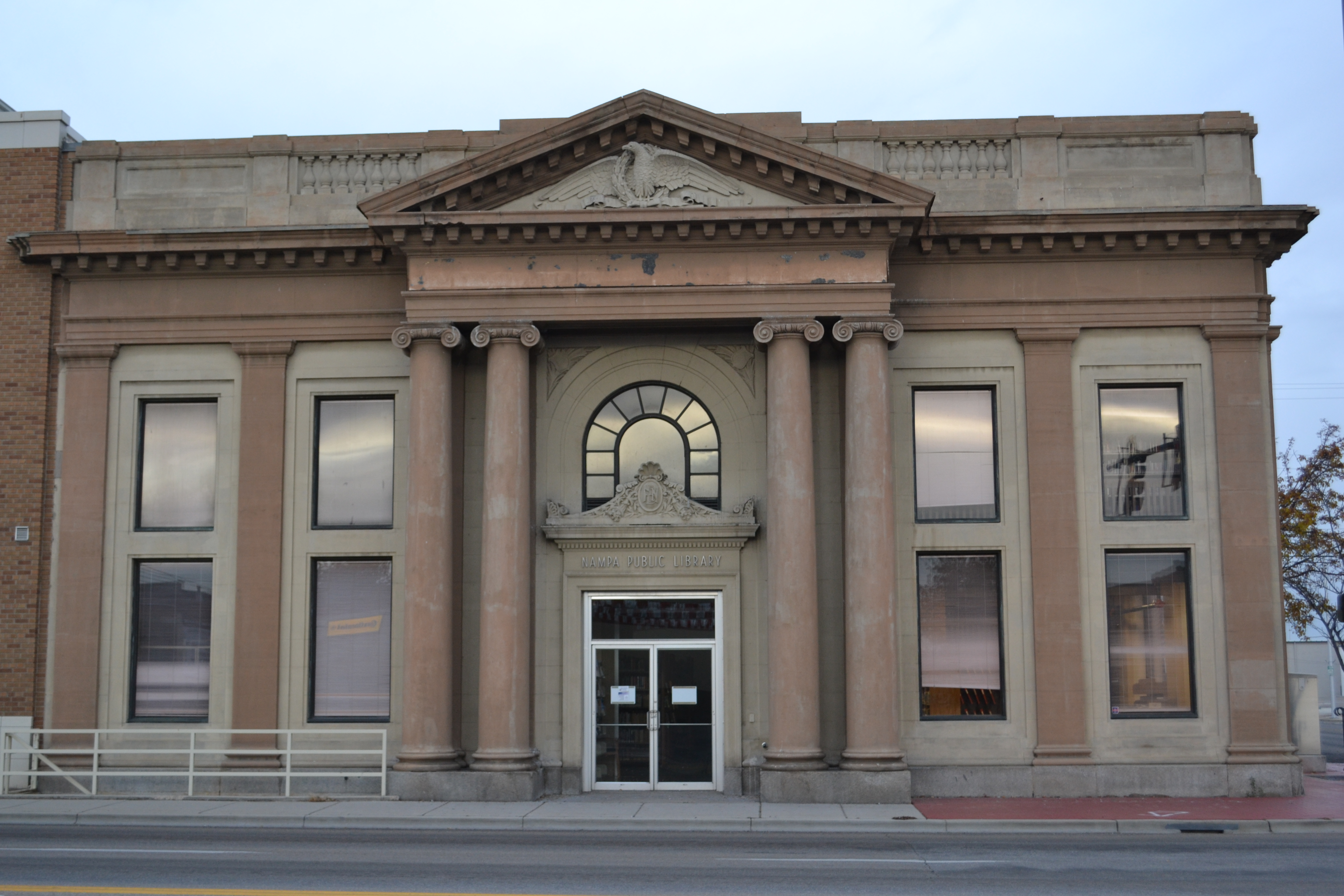

- Location within Idaho Location within the United States
- Location: 101 11th Ave., S., Nampa, Idaho
- Coordinates: 43°34′47″N 116°33′37″W
- Area: less than one acre
- Built: 1919-c. 1920
- Architect: Tourtellotte & Hummel
- Architectural style: Classical Revival
- NRHP reference No.: 76000670
- Added to NRHP: May 13, 1976

The Farmers and Merchants Bank, now the Nampa Public Library, at 101 11th Ave., S., in Nampa, Idaho is an Idaho bank building whose construction began in 1919. It was designed by Idaho's most notable architects Tourtellotte & Hummel in Classical Revival style that suggests solidity. It is a 60 feet (18 m) by 90 feet (27 m) two-story building with a portico consisting of a pediment supported by two pairs of Ionic columns. The pediment's tympanum contains an eagle sculpture. Within the portico, above the front door of the bank, is "Nampa Public Library" in block letters and a smaller pediment is sculpted and includes insignia of the First National Bank.

A banking downturn hit, however, before it was completed, and the Farmers and Mechanics Bank company was absorbed by the First National Bank. The building was occupied by the Stockmen's National Bank company, which was absorbed by the First Security Bank in 1927. The building was donated to the city of Nampa for use as its library by the First Security Bank in 1965.

It was listed on the National Register of Historic Places in 1976.

It was deemed significant in part for its architecture, in particular for "its sculpted pediments on the portico and above the door, and for its fine stained glass skylight, which is still in place."

Nampa Public Library occupied the building until 2015, when a new library was constructed. The bank building was renovated, and it reopened in 2018 as a multi-office commercial space.

Henry Aldous Dixon was managing vice president of the bank from 1924 to 1932, between two terms as superintendent of a university.
