= Gorby =

Gorby may refer to:

- A nickname for Mikhail Gorbachev, the last leader of the Soviet Union
  - The Gorbachev Foundation or its website
- A talking vehicle British cartoon character in Finley the Fire Engine
- A place in Izard County, Arkansas, United States
- Gorby Opera Theater, Glenns Ferry, Idaho, United States
