= Holy Rosary Church (Idaho Falls, Idaho) =

Historic church in Idaho, United States

- U.S. National Register of Historic Places
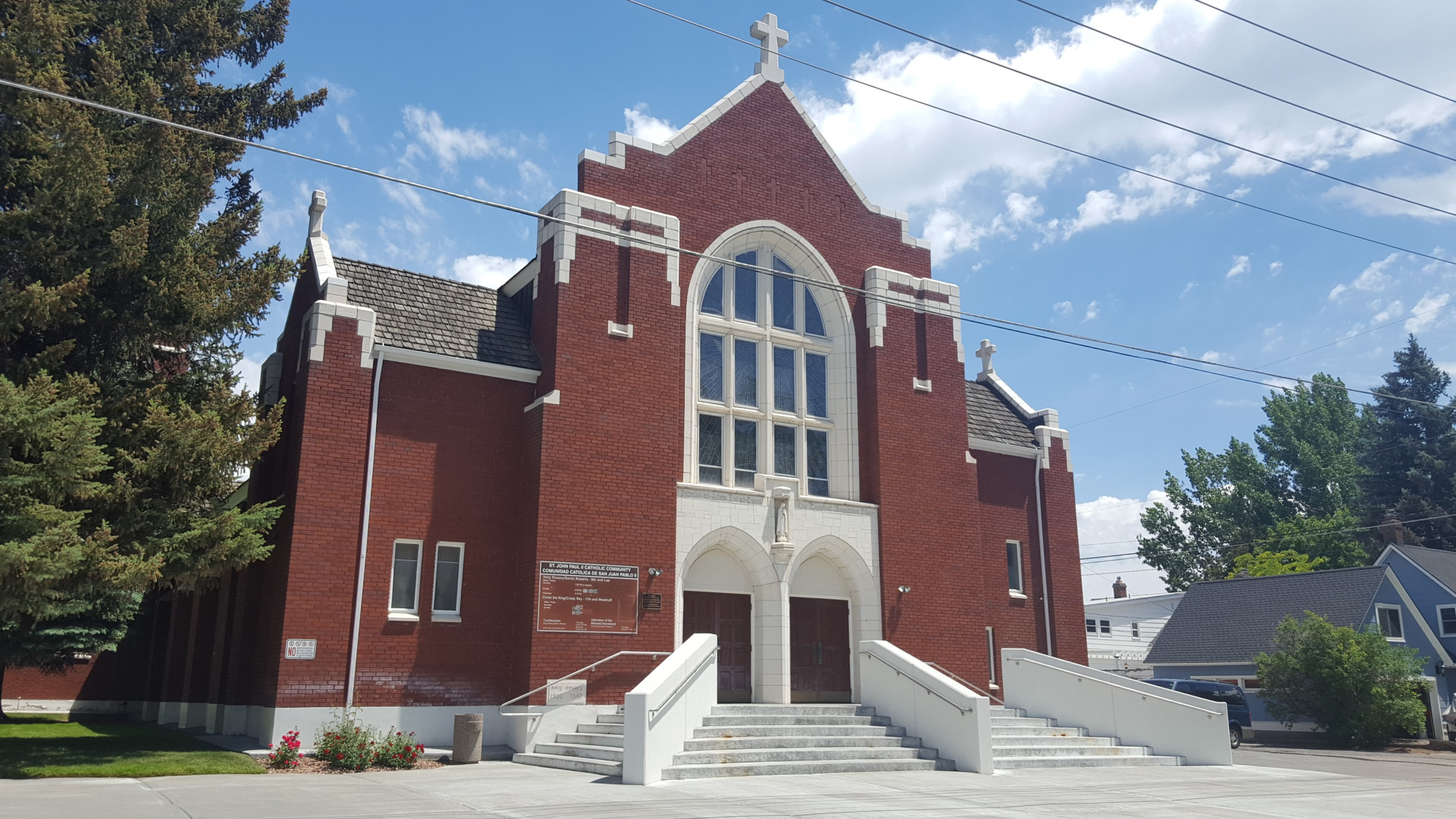
- Holy Rosary church as it is today.

- Location within Idaho Location within the United States
- Location: 288 E. Ninth St. Idaho Falls, Idaho
- Coordinates: 43°29′22.5″N 112°01′44.6″W
- Area: less than one acre
- Built: 1948
- Built by: Arlington Construction Co.
- Architect: Hummel, Hummel & Jones
- Architectural style: Late Gothic Revival
- NRHP reference No.: 02000802
- Added to NRHP: July 17, 2002

The Holy Rosary Church on E. Ninth St. in Idaho Falls, Idaho was built in 1948. It was listed on the National Register of Historic Places in 2002.

The building is an "imposing" gable-fronted building with concrete foundation and trim, red brick walls, and a wood shingle roof. Its style includes elements of the English Gothic style of architecture. The current pastor of Holy Rosary Church is Fr. Francisco Flores which became pastor in July of 2021 to the present day.
