= Collister School =

Historic building in Boise, Idaho

- U.S. National Register of Historic Places
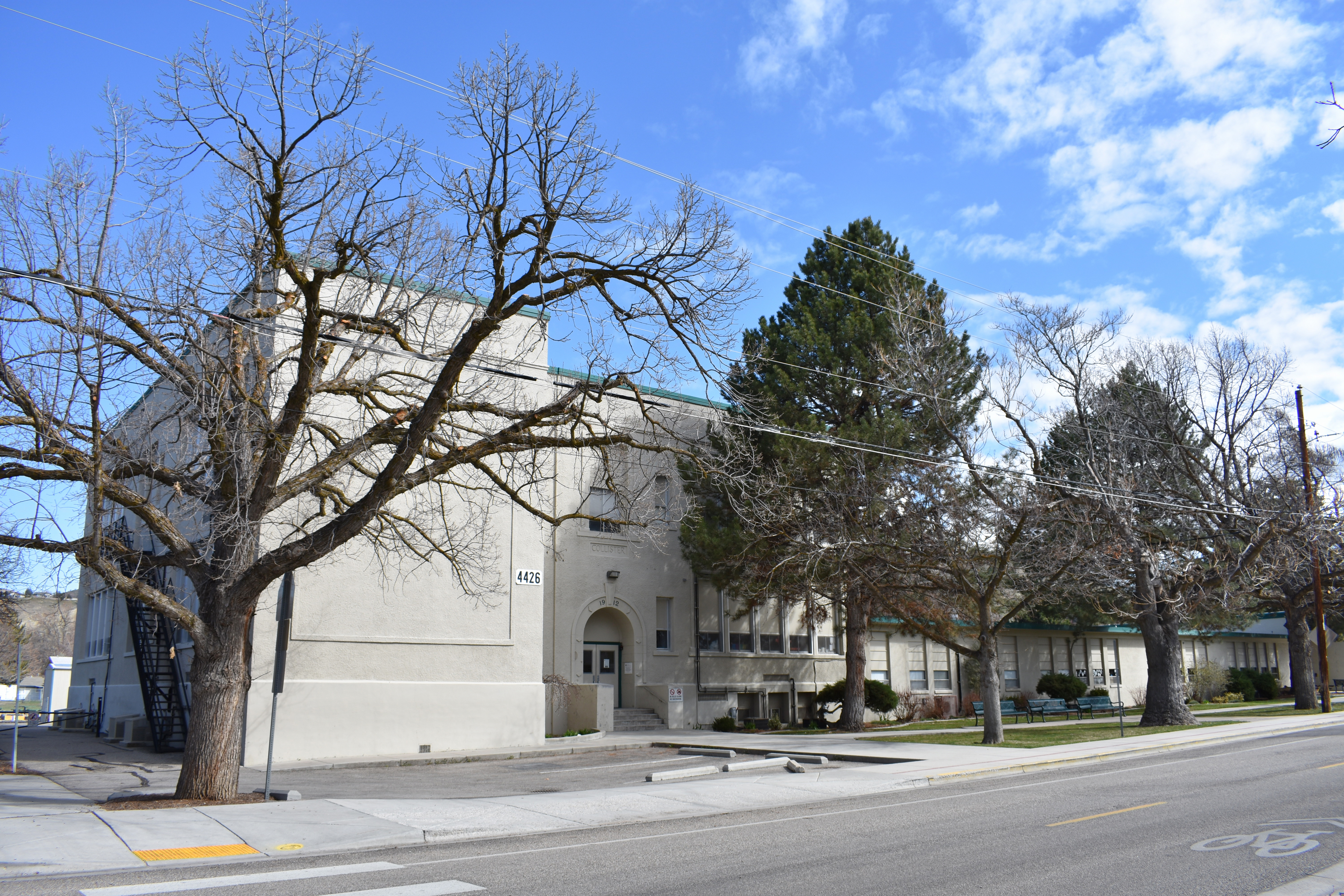
- Collister School in 2019, showing the 1948 expansion (left), original design (center), and the 1953 expansion (right)

- Location within Idaho Location within the United States
- Location: 4426 Catalpa Dr., Boise, Idaho
- Coordinates: 43°39′21″N 116°14′35″W
- Area: 5 acres (2.0 ha)
- Built: 1912
- Architect: Tourtellotte & Hummel
- MPS: Boise Public Schools TR
- NRHP reference No.: 82000190
- Added to NRHP: November 8, 1982

Collister School in the Collister neighborhood of Boise, Idaho, was designed by Tourtellotte & Hummel and constructed in 1912. The 2-story, 4-room, stucco over brick building features large window bays and a flat parapet roofline with minimal ornamentation. The building was expanded in 1948 with a 2-story addition to the left of the original structure. Another expansion in 1953 added a 1-story row of classrooms to the right. The school was listed on the National Register of Historic Places in 1982.

A 1-room Collister School in the suburban town of Collister, Idaho, had existed prior to 1912. But by 1911, conditions at the school were overcrowded and unsanitary. The school was part of Ada County School District #46, and voters approved a bond measure for construction of a new school in 1912. In 1922 the school was annexed into the Boise Independent School District.

== Dr. George Collister ==
Dr. George Collister (October 16, 1856—October 18, 1935) began his medical practice in Boise in 1881, and he owned farmland at the site of Collister Station, a stop on the Boise Interurban Railway. In 1912 George and Mary Collister donated land for the construction of Collister School.
