= Guernsey Dairy Milk Depot =

- U.S. National Register of Historic Places
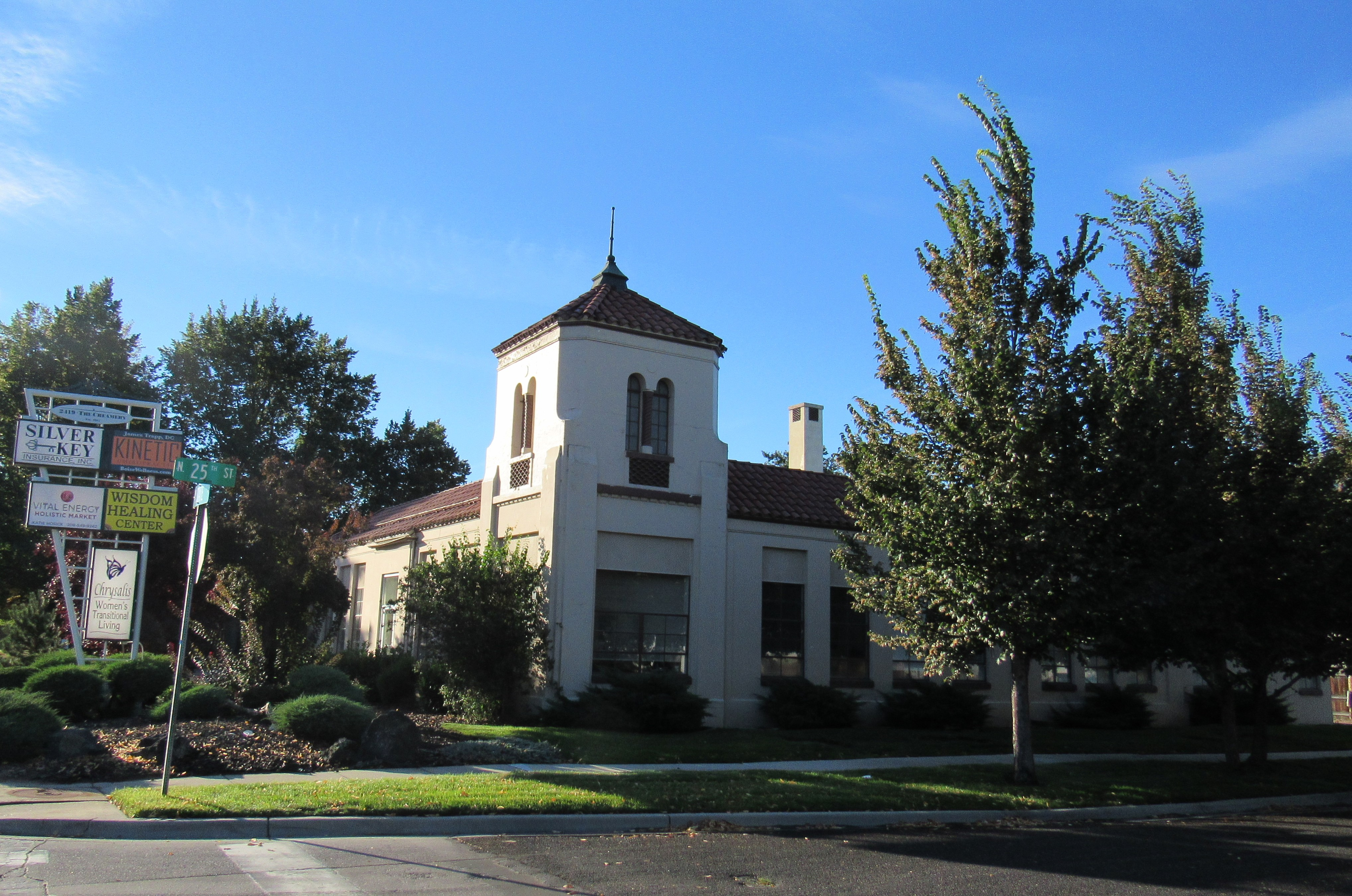

- Location within Idaho Location within the United States
- Location: 2419 W. State St. Boise, Idaho
- Coordinates: 43°37′46″N 116°13′9″W
- Area: less than one acre
- Built: 1937
- Built by: L. S. Mallory
- Architect: Tourtellotte & Hummel
- Architectural style: Spanish Colonial Revival
- MPS: Tourtellotte and Hummel Architecture TR
- NRHP reference No.: 82000206
- Added to NRHP: November 17, 1982

The Guernsey Dairy Milk Depot is a historic building in Boise, Idaho. It was placed on the National Register of Historic Places in 1982.

The Depot was built in 1937 by L. S. Mallory to designs by architects Tourtellotte & Hummel. It is a rare example of Spanish Colonial Revival architecture in their portfolio. It was built to house both commercial and light industrial operations. It has been occupied as offices since at least the 1980s.

== See also ==
- National Register of Historic Places listings in Ada County, Idaho
