= Nampa Presbyterian Church =

Historic church in Idaho, United States

- U.S. National Register of Historic Places
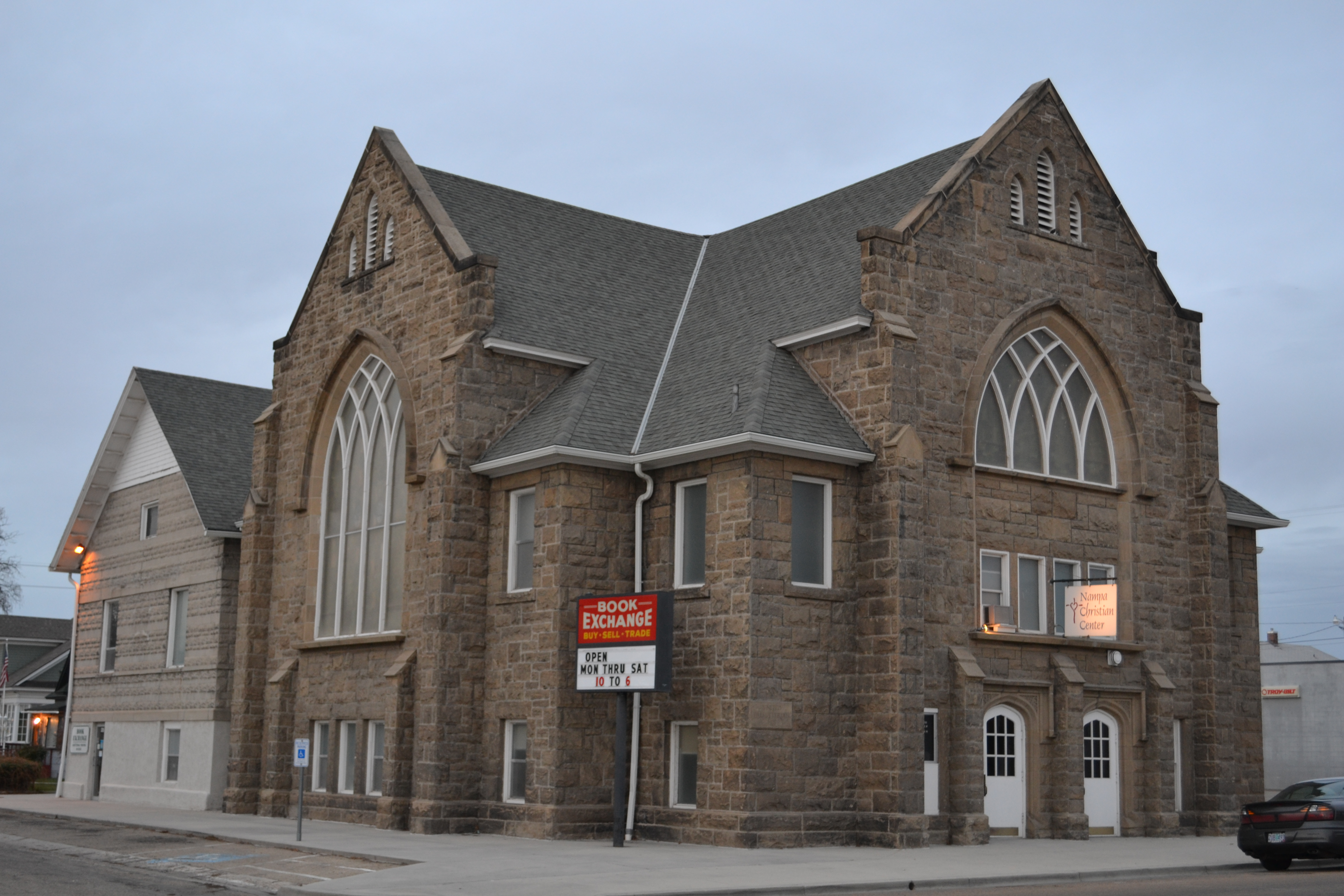
- Nampa Presbyterian Church, 2011

- Location within Idaho Location within the United States
- Location: 2nd St. and 15th Ave., S., Nampa, Idaho
- Coordinates: 43°34′34″N 116°33′25″W
- Area: less than one acre
- Built: 1918
- Architect: Tourtellotte & Hummel
- Architectural style: Late Gothic Revival
- MPS: Tourtellotte and Hummel Architecture TR
- NRHP reference No.: 82000330
- Added to NRHP: November 17, 1982

Nampa Presbyterian Church is a historic church at 2nd Street and 15th Avenue, South in Nampa, Idaho. It was built in 1918 and was added to the National Register in 1982.

It was designed by architects Tourtellotte & Hummel. Its NRHP nomination states:

The Nampa Presbyterian Church is architecturally significant as a handsome and unaltered Gothic church design of the later 1910s, which suggests in the increased verticality of its parapeted gables the renewed picturesque impulse that seems to have been emerging at this time (see also site 95). The church is also significant as one of the fairly numerous Nampa commissions by this firm, one which contributes welcome texture and style in a town whose streetscapes are considerably eroded. Finally, it stands as an example of the progressive building campaigns whereby small-town churches often accommodated growing congregations with limited resources.

It was listed on the National Register as part of a study of historic properties designed by Tourtellotte & Hummel.
