= Hummel Architects =

American architectural firm

Practice information
- Founders: John E. Tourtellotte
- Founded: 1890 (135 years ago)
- Location: Boise, Idaho

Website
- hummelarch.com

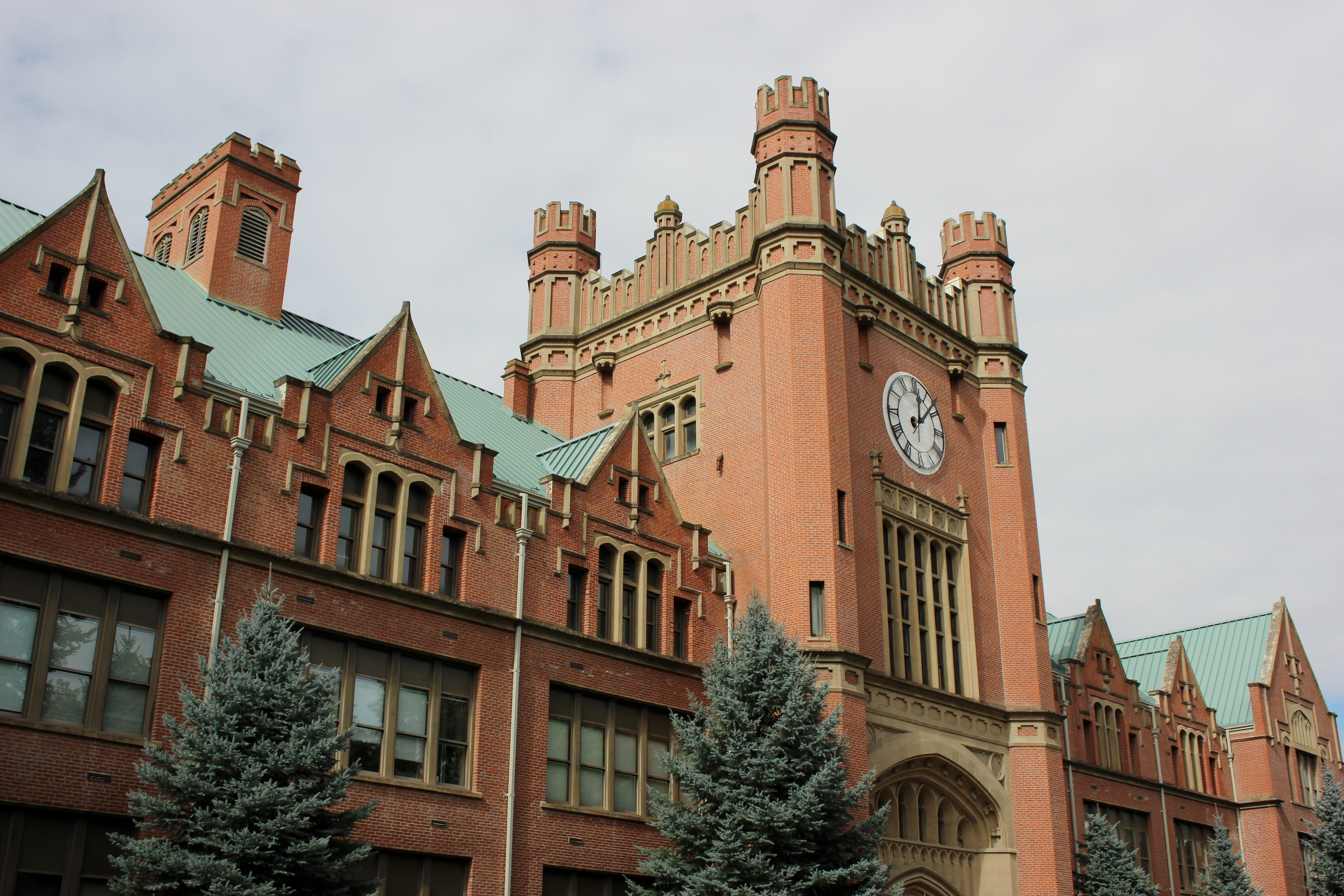
The Administration Building of the University of Idaho, in Moscow, Idaho, designed by J. E. Tourtellotte & Company in the Collegiate Gothic architecture style and completed in 1908.

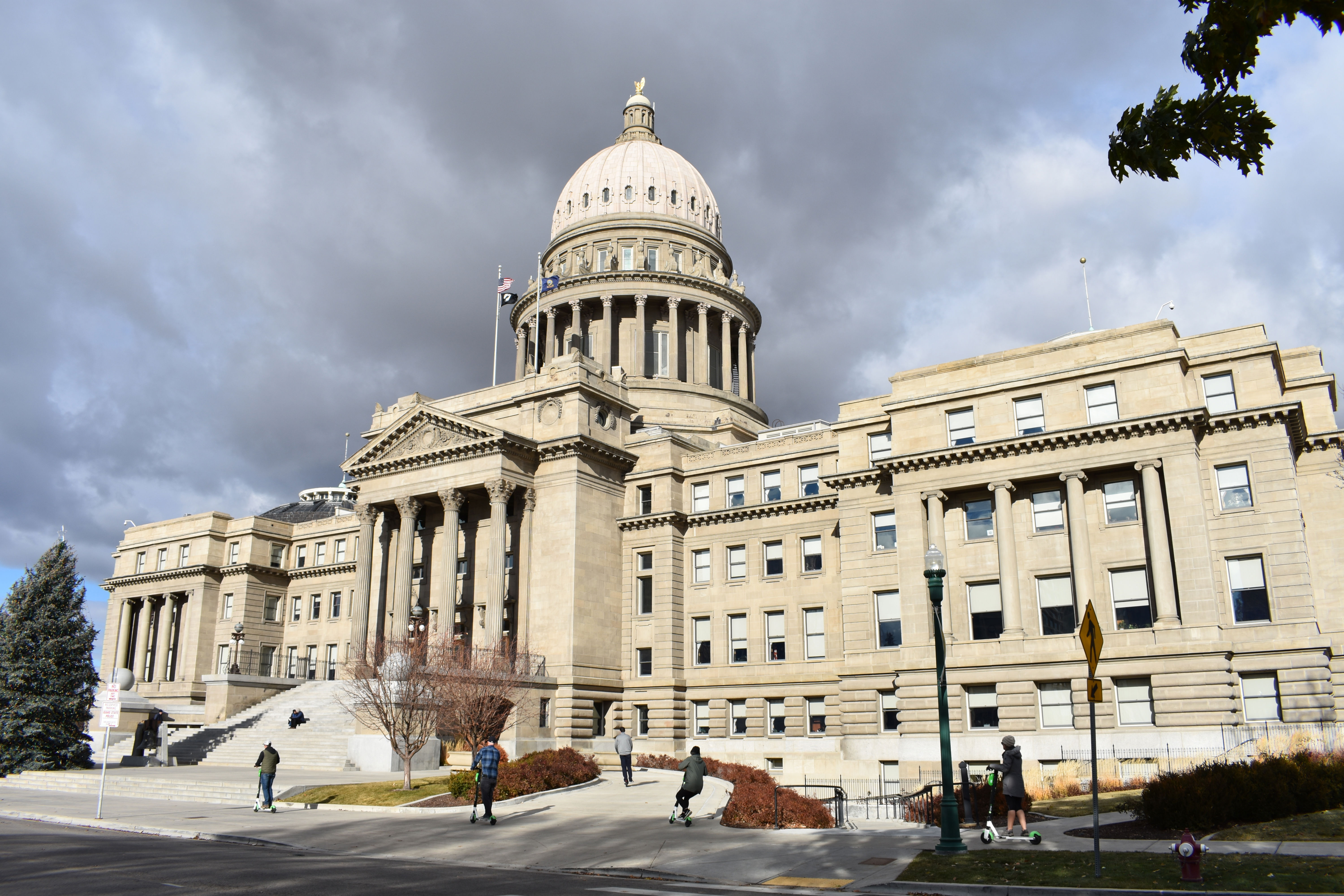
The Idaho State Capitol in Boise, designed by Tourtellotte & Hummel in the Neoclassical / Classical Revival style, architectural design completed in 1913, project under construction 1905-1920.

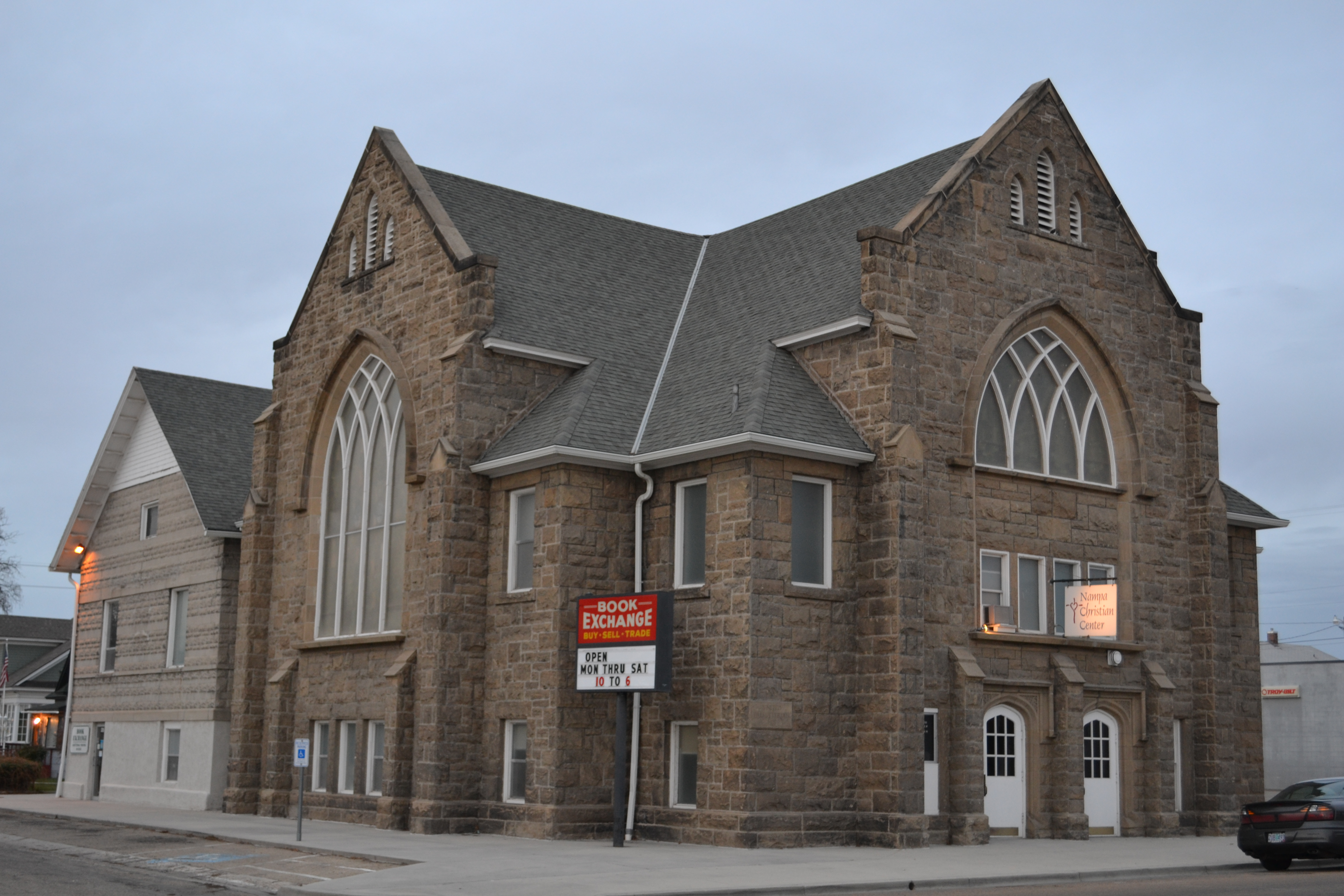
The Nampa Presbyterian Church, designed by Tourtellotte & Hummel in the Gothic Revival style and completed in 1918.

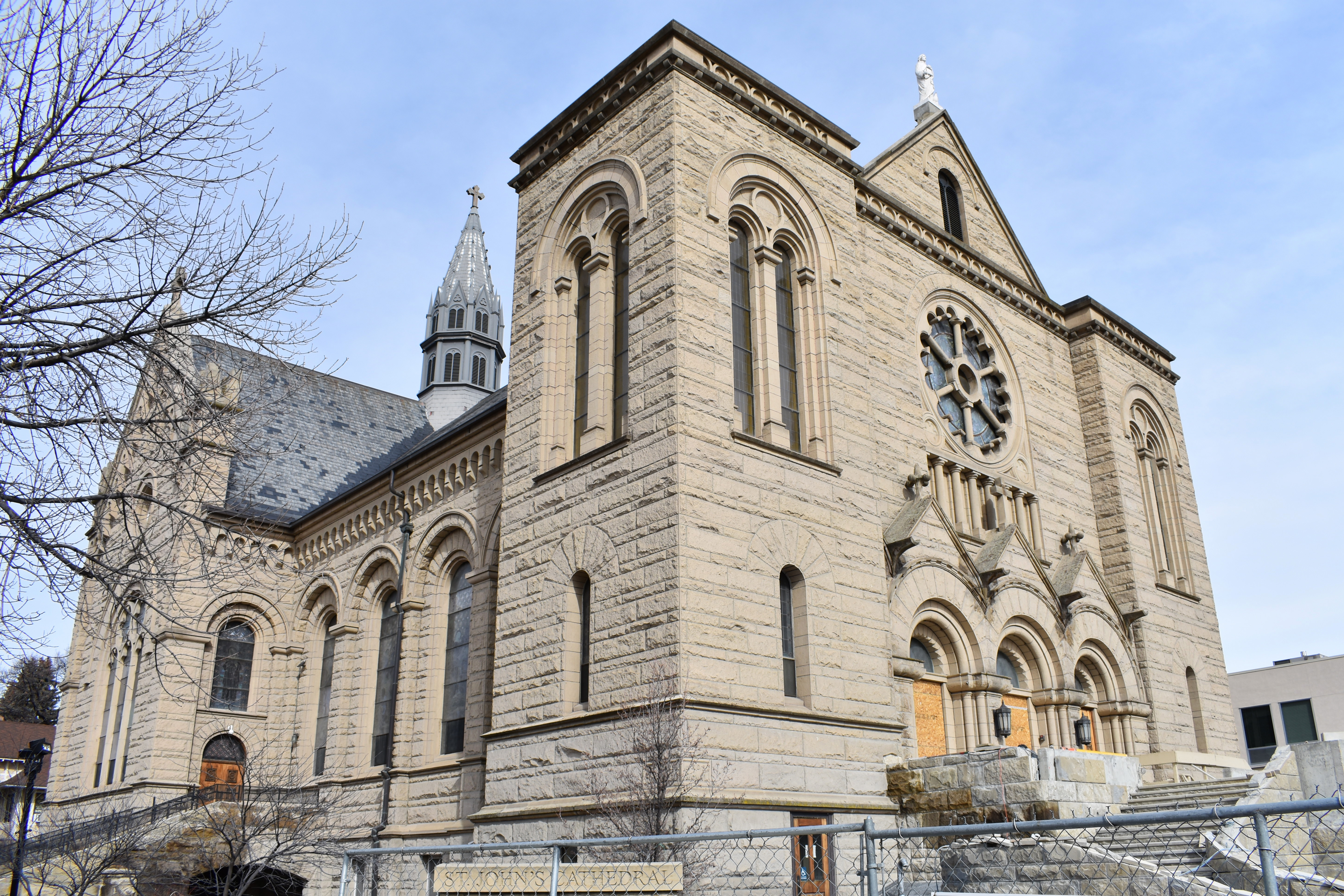
The Cathedral of St. John the Evangelist in Boise, designed by Tourtellotte & Hummel in the Romanesque Revival style and completed in 1921.

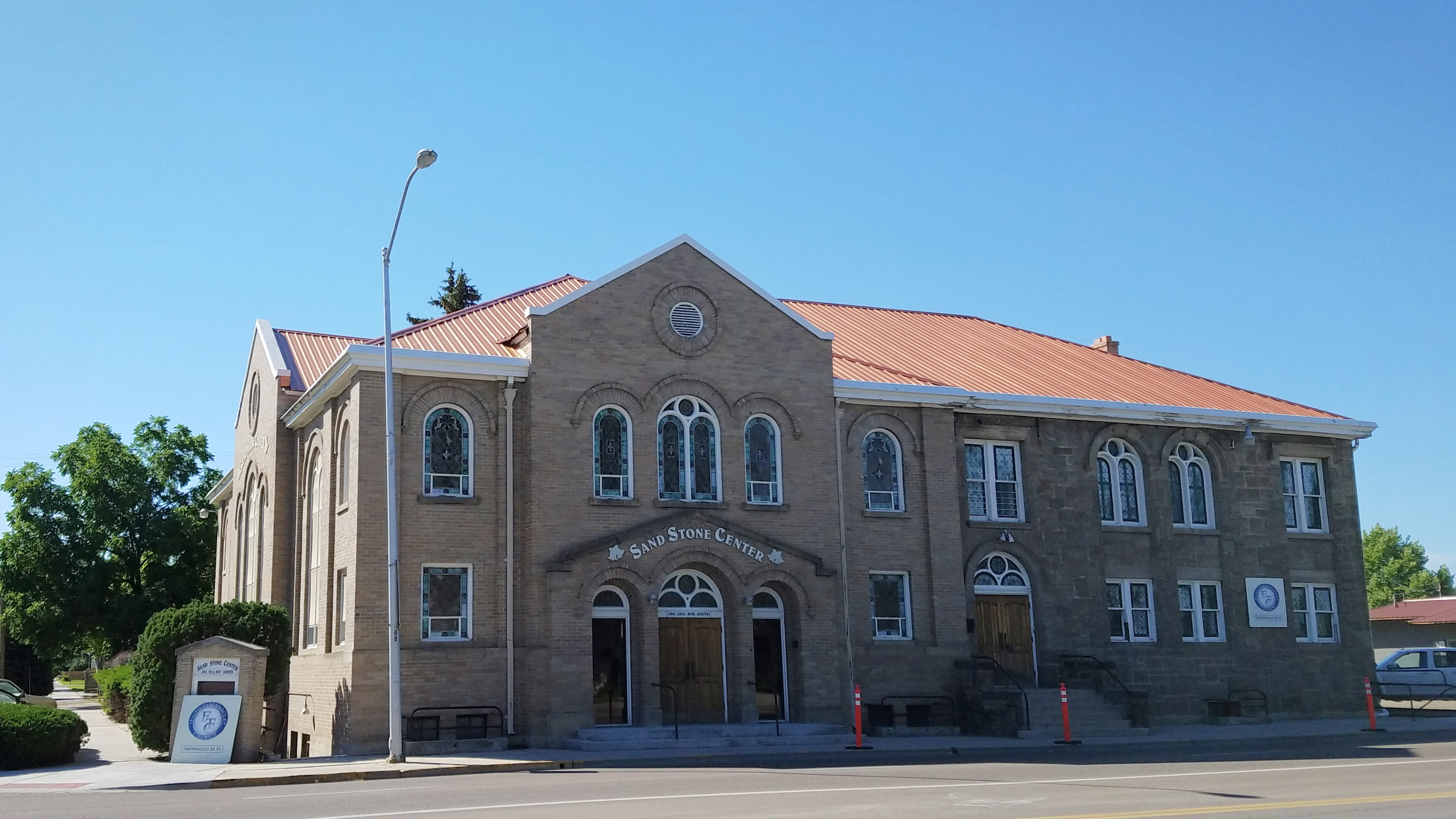
The Nampa First Methodist Episcopal Church in Nampa, designed by Tourtellotte & Hummel in the Romanesque Revival style and completed in 1922.

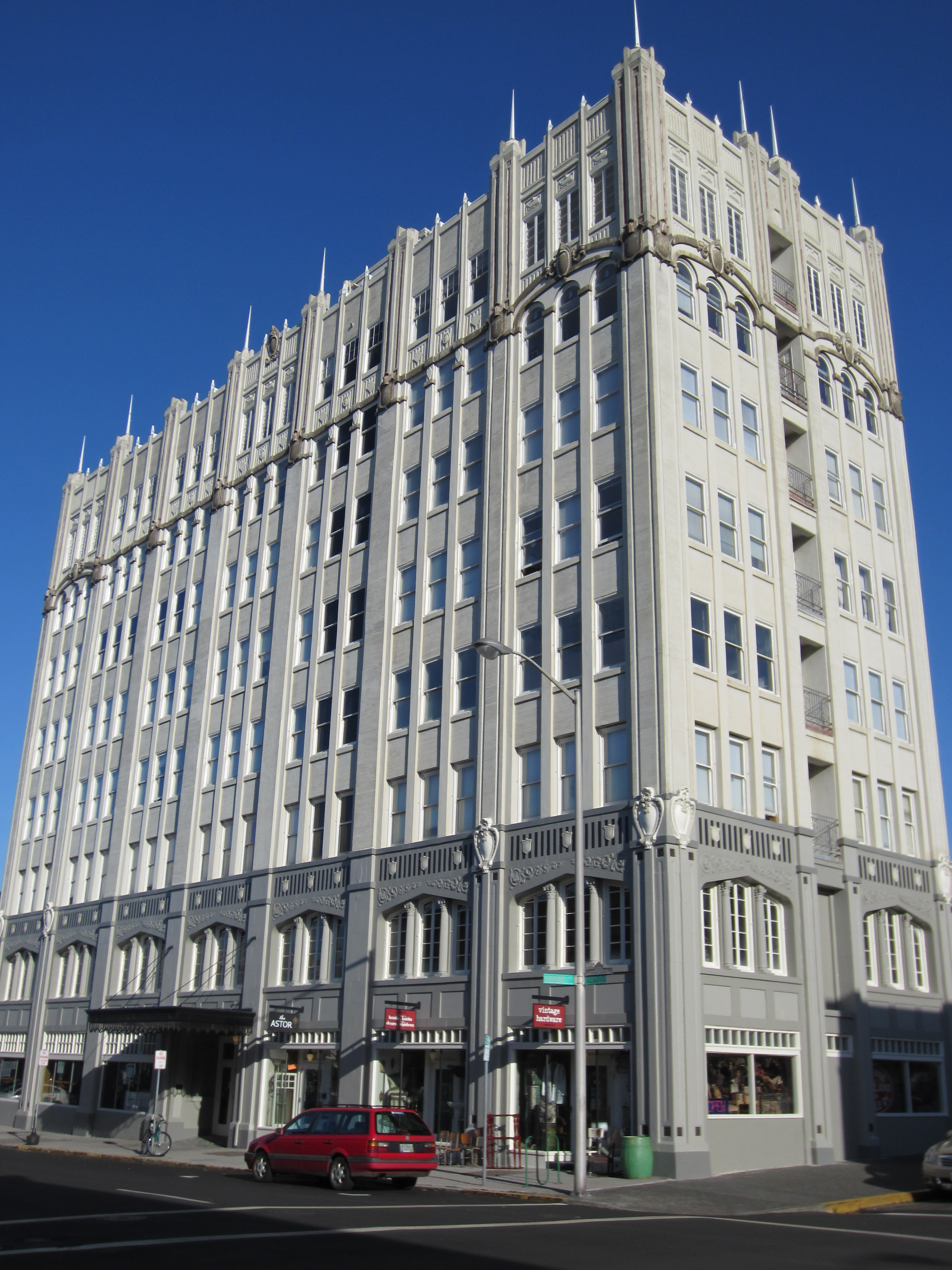
The former John Jacob Astor Hotel in Astoria, Oregon, designed by Tourtellotte & Hummel in the Gothic Revival style and completed in 1924.

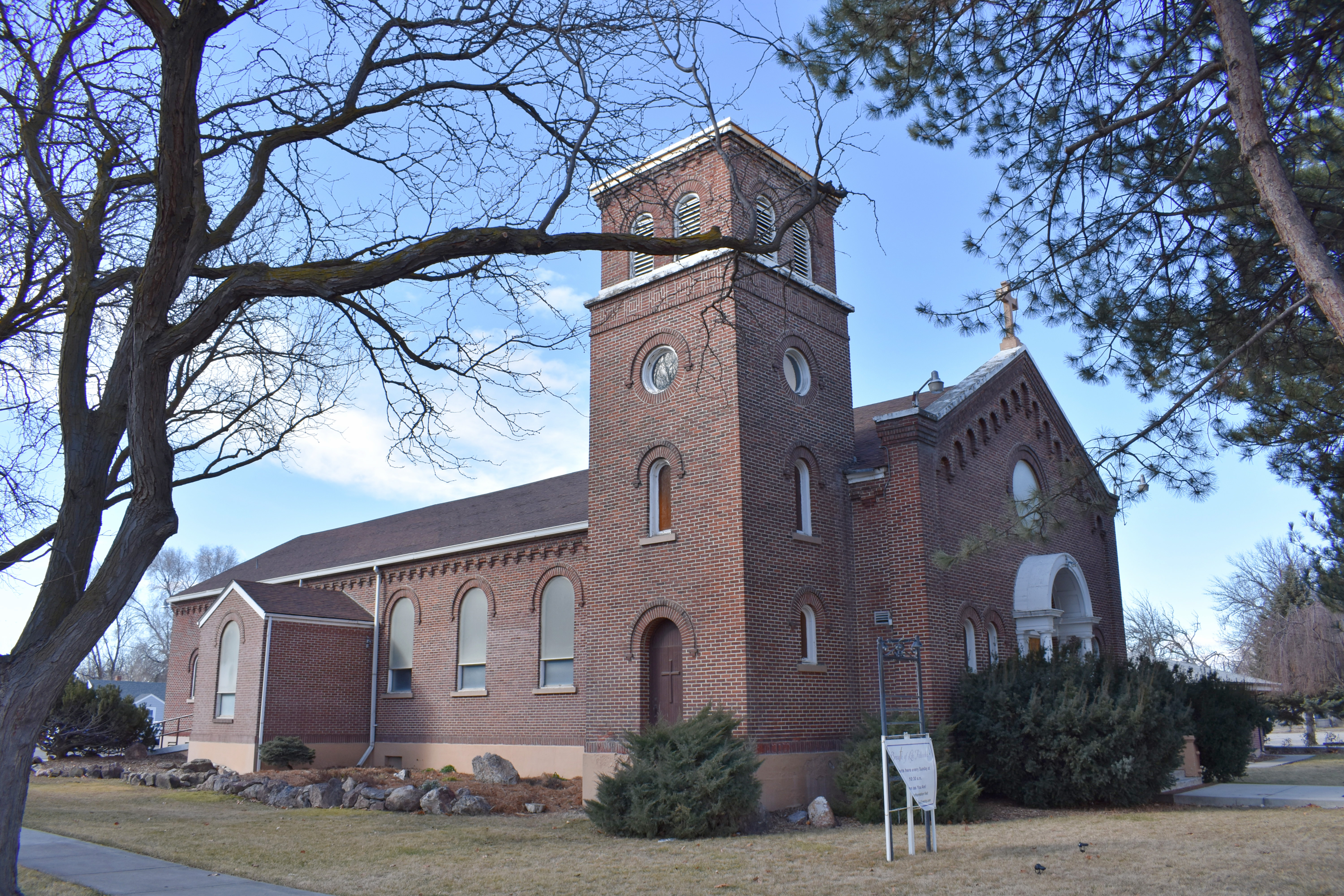
St. Mary's Catholic Church in Caldwell, designed by Tourtellotte & Hummel in the Romanesque Revival style and completed in 1925.

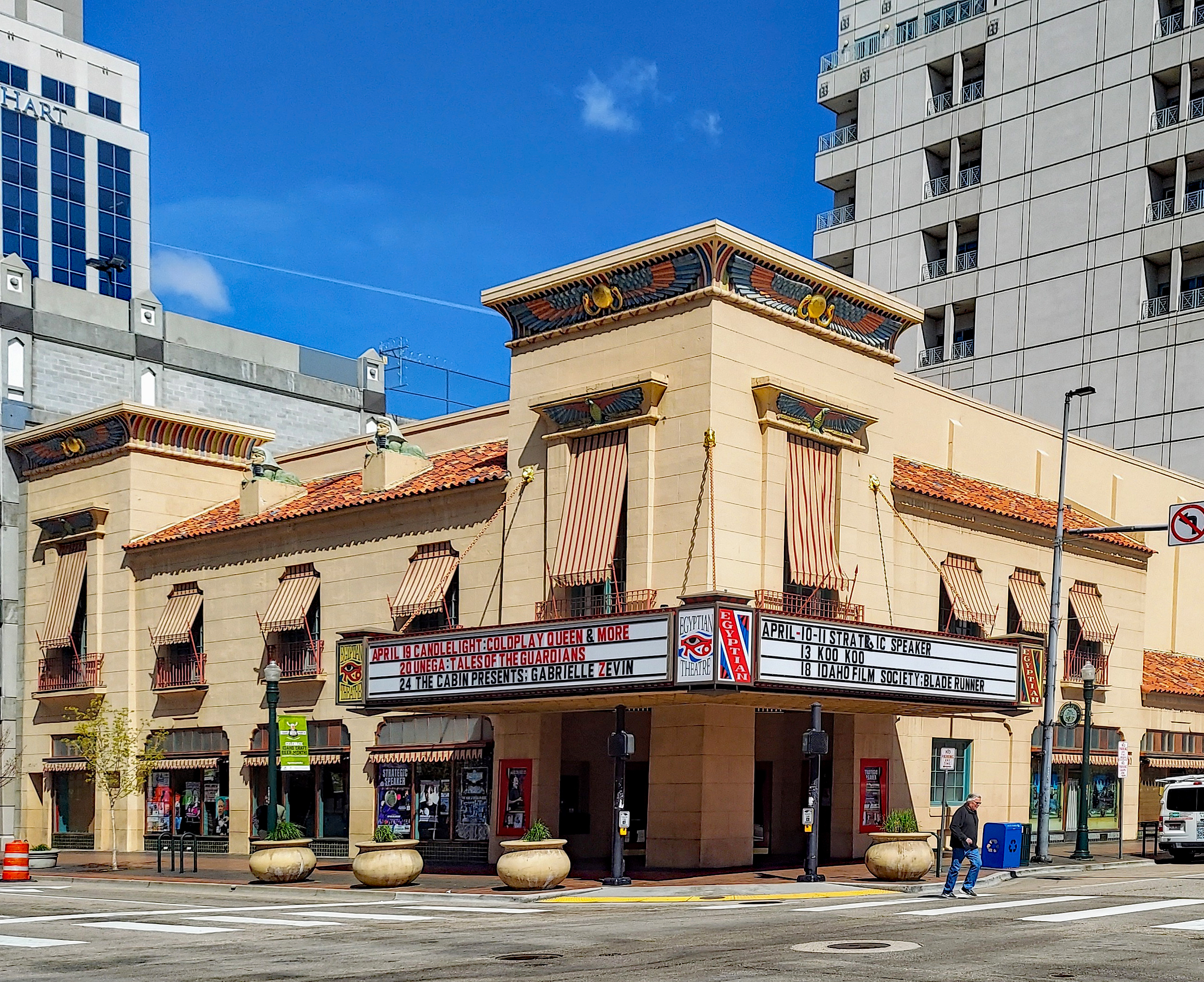
The Egyptian Theatre in Boise, designed by Tourtellotte & Hummel in the Egyptian Revival style and completed in 1927.

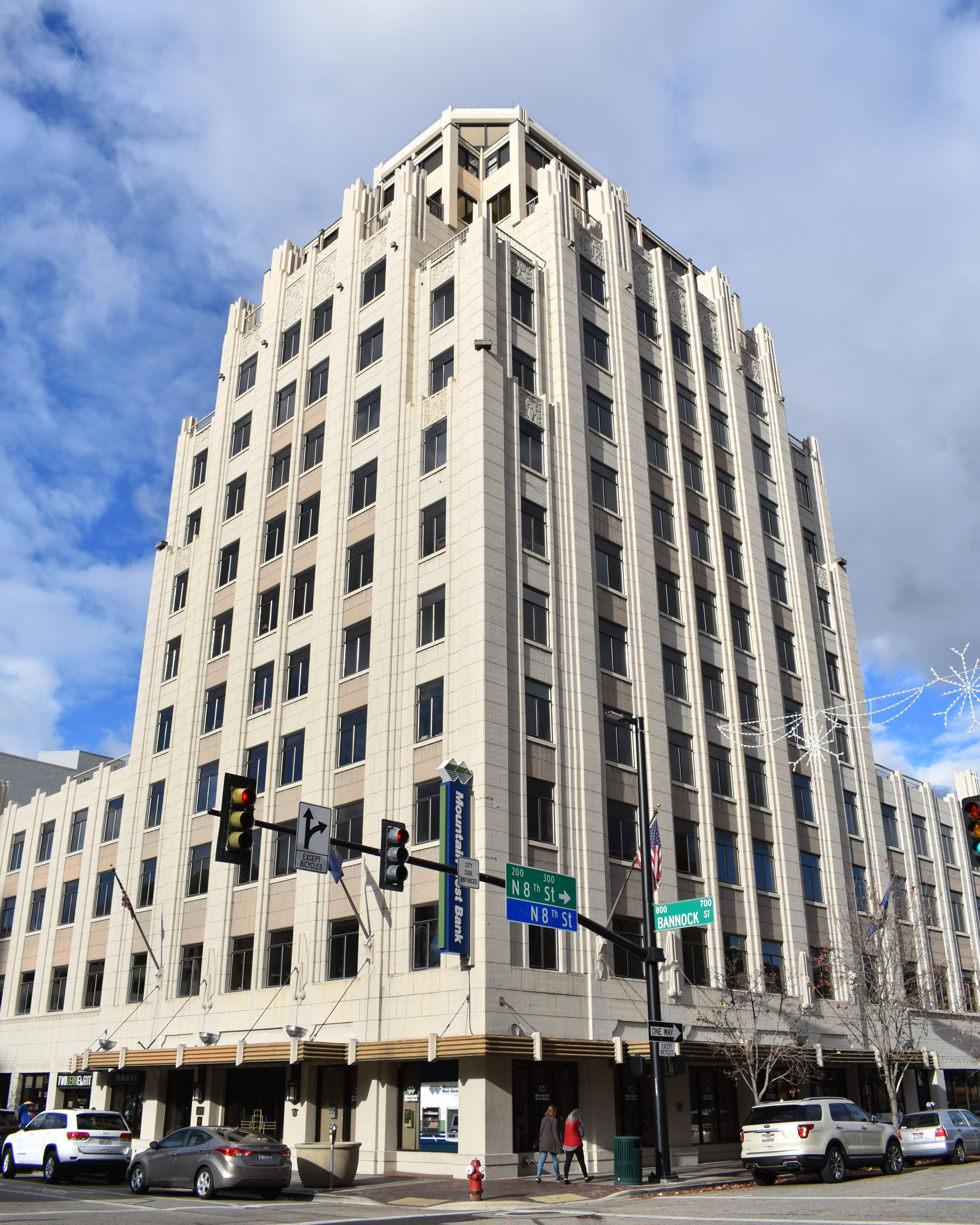
The Hotel Boise, now the Hoff Building, in Boise, designed by Tourtellotte & Hummel in the Art Deco style and completed in 1930.

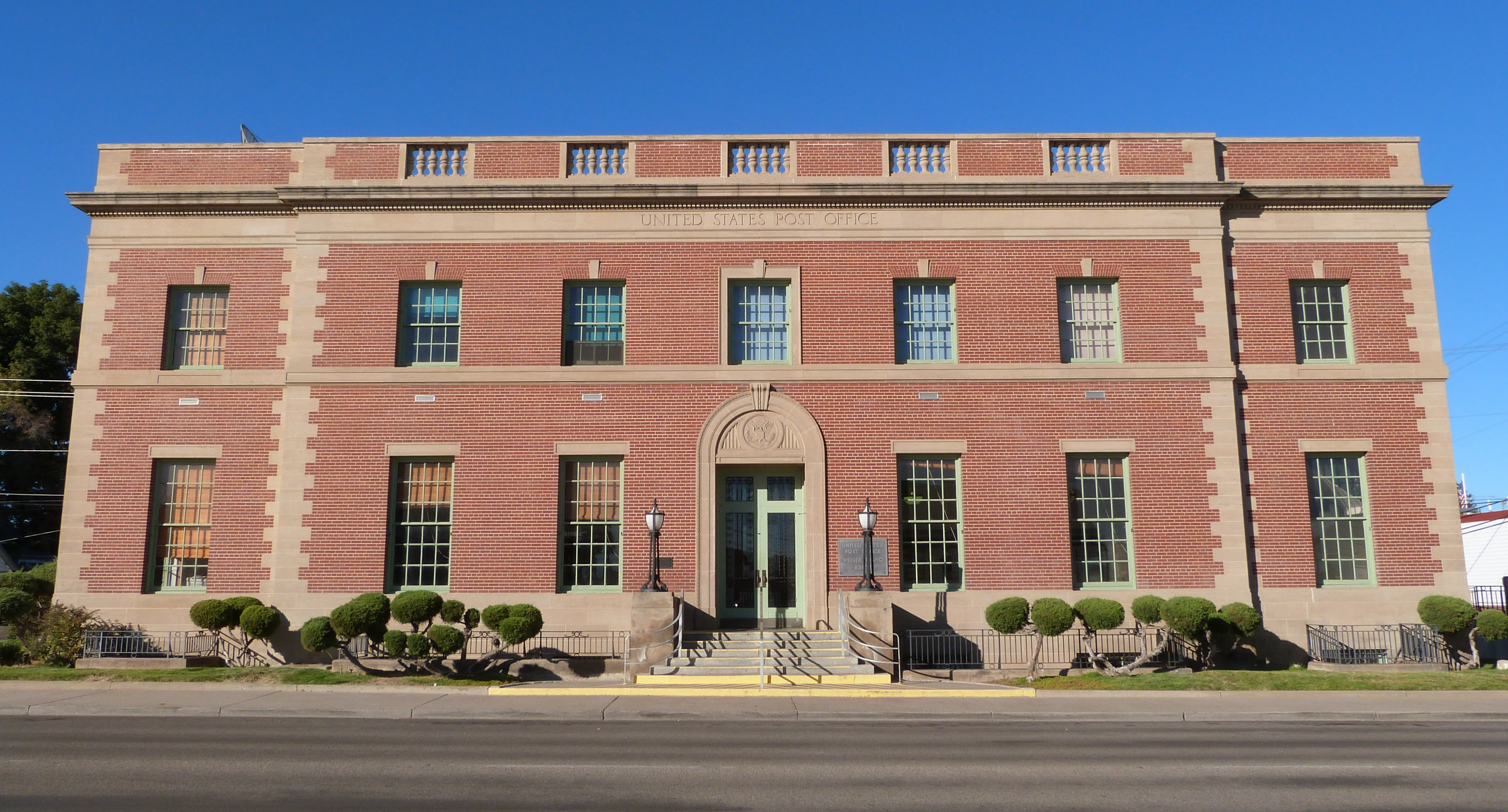
The United States Post Office in Weiser, designed by Tourtellotte & Hummel in the Colonial Revival style and completed in 1933.

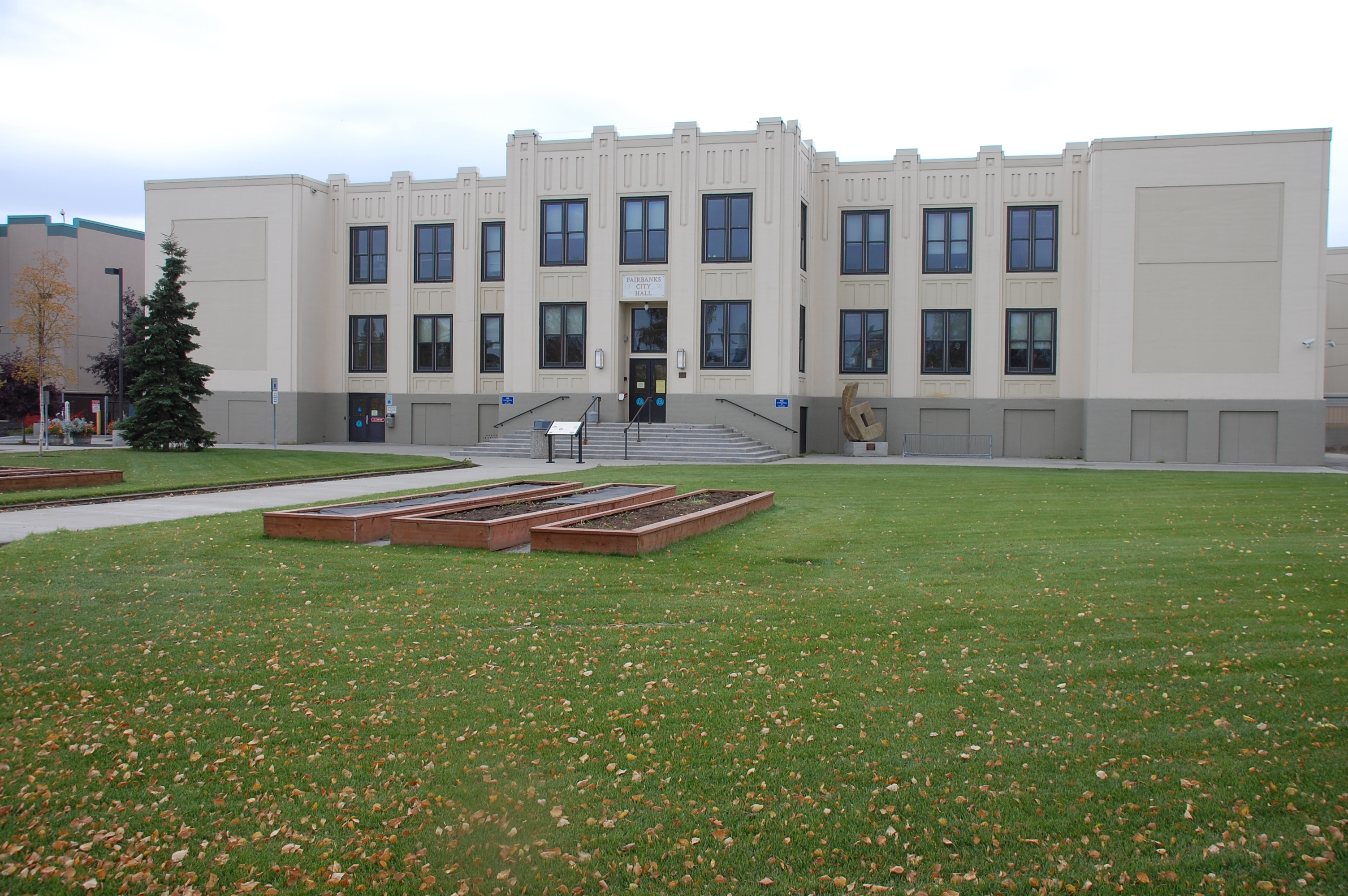
The former Main School in Fairbanks, Alaska, designed by Tourtellotte & Hummel in the Art Deco style and completed in 1934.

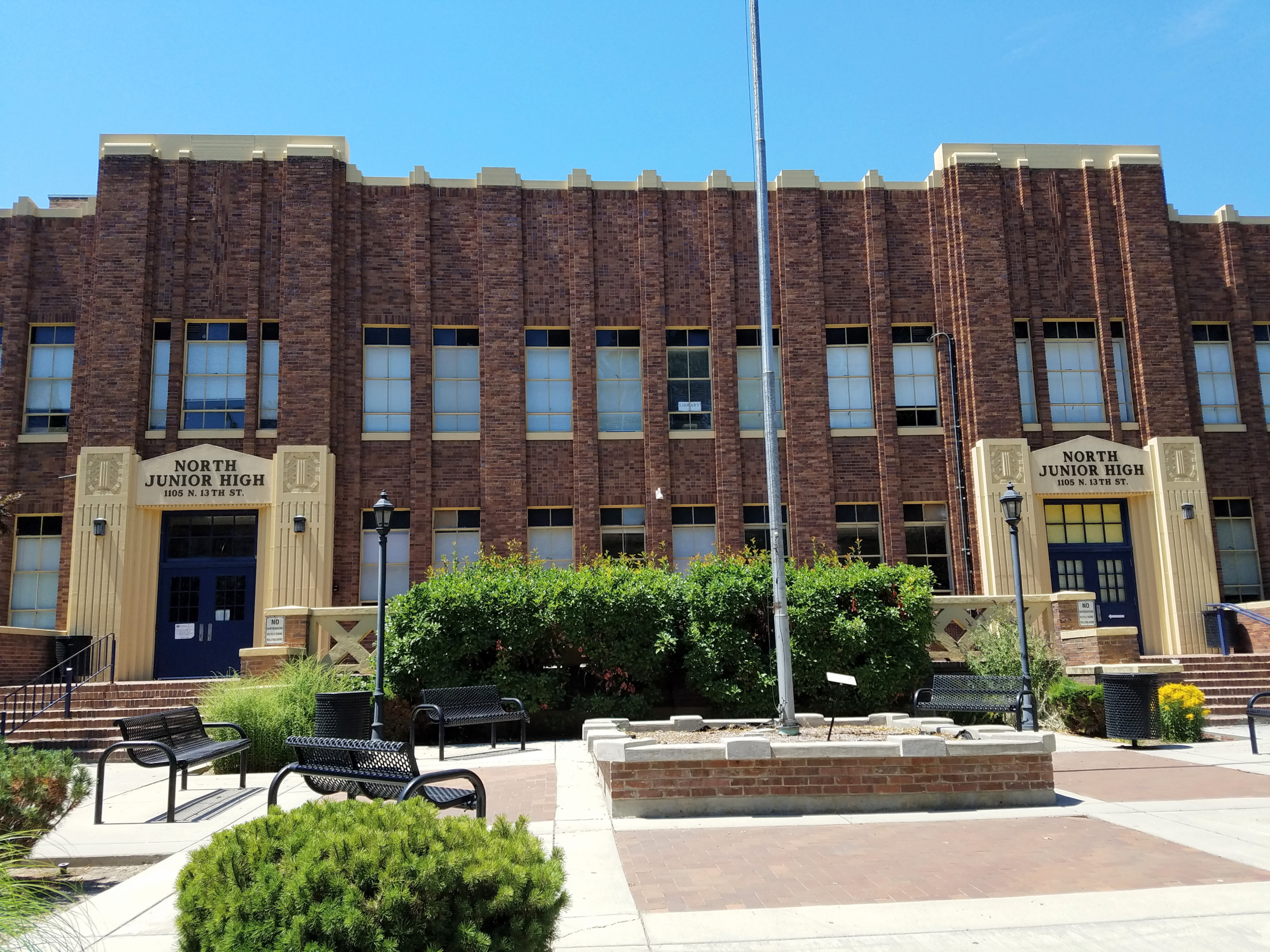
The Boise Junior High School, designed by Tourtellotte & Hummel in the Art Deco style and completed in 1937.

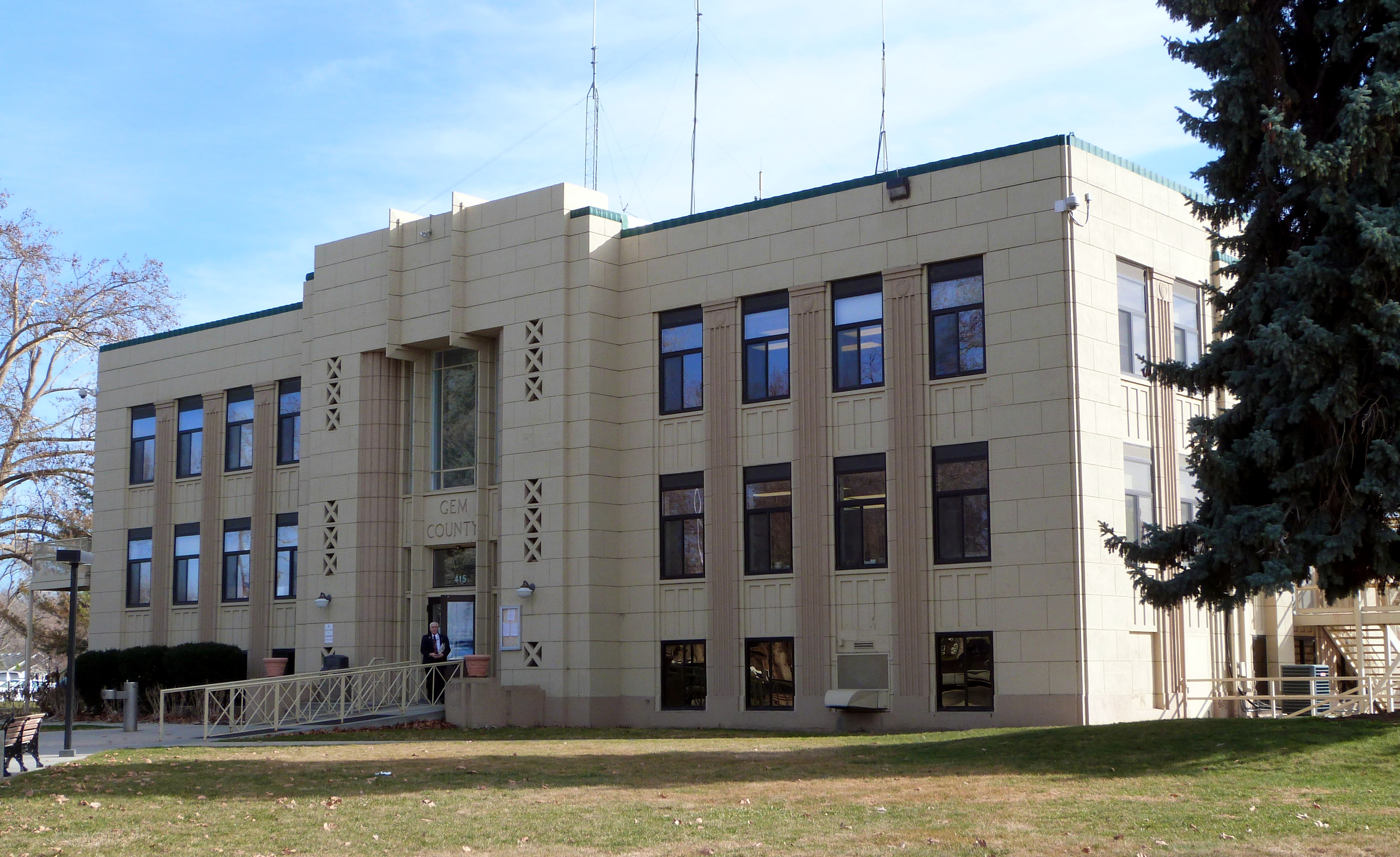
The Gem County Courthouse in Emmett, designed by Tourtellotte & Hummel in the Art Deco style and completed in 1938.

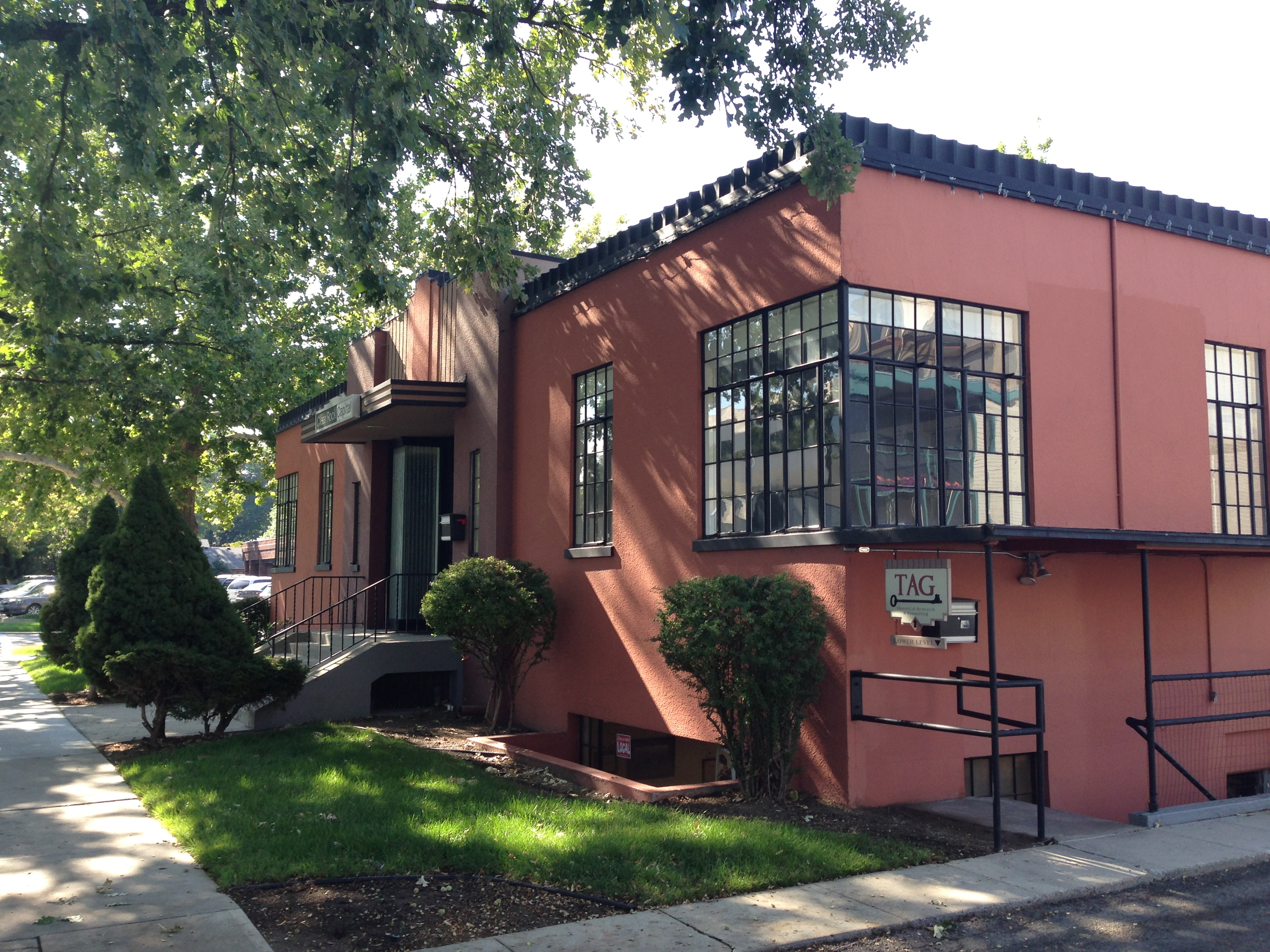
The John Regan American Legion Hall in Boise, designed by Tourtellotte & Hummel in the Moderne style and completed in 1939.

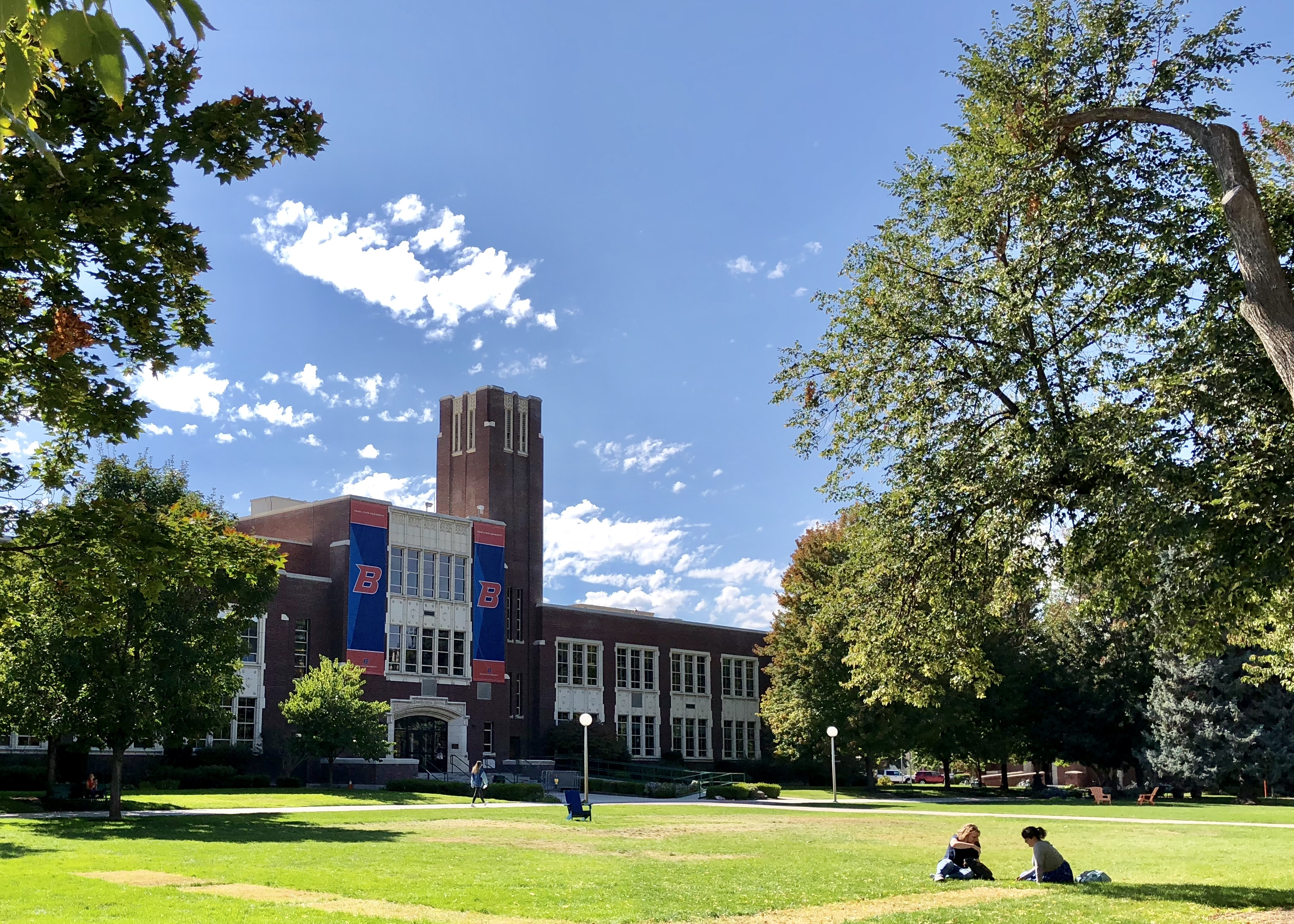
The Administration Building of Boise State University, designed by Tourtellotte & Hummel in the Collegiate Gothic style and completed in 1940.

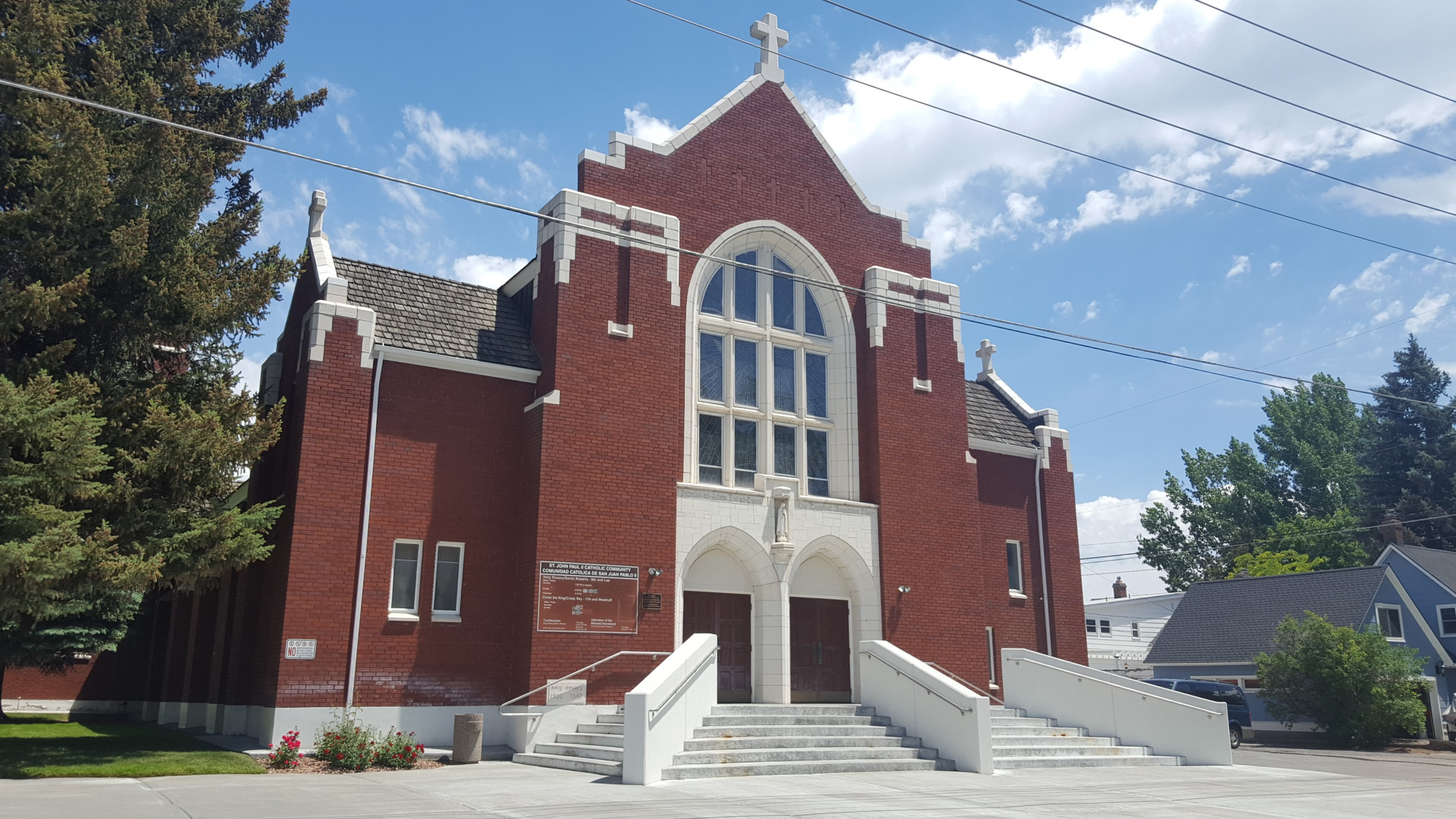
Holy Rosary Church in Idaho, designed by Hummel, Hummel & Jones in the Gothic Revival style and completed in 1948.

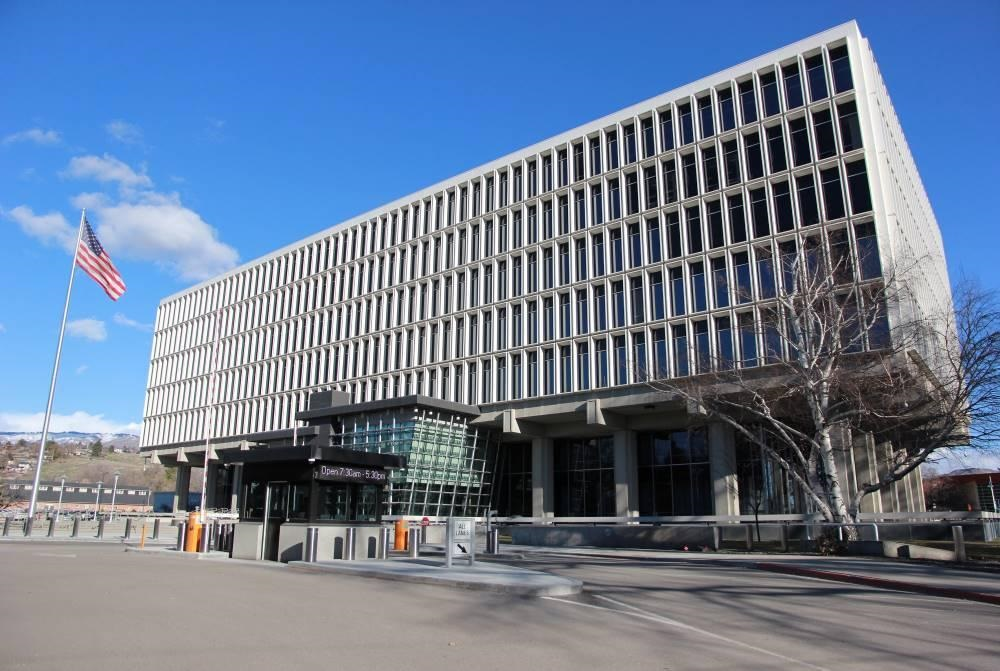
The James A. McClure Federal Building and United States Courthouse in Boise, designed by Hummel, Hummel, Jones & Shawver in the New Formalist style and completed in 1968.

Hummel Architects PLLC is an American architectural firm based in Boise, Idaho. Its history extends back to 1890, when architect and contractor John E. Tourtellotte (1869-1939), of Massachusetts established himself in Boise. The firm is best remembered for the work it completed from 1910 to 1942 under the partnership / firm name of Tourtellotte & Hummel, joining with Charles Hummel, including the Idaho State Capitol in Boise, (designed 1904-1913, constructed 1905-1920). From 1922 until 2002 it was led by three successive generations of the Hummel family.

== Overview ==
Hummel Architects' current practice is based on the design of educational, healthcare and government projects. In July 2024 existing principals Scott Straubhar and Ed Daniels were joined by five additional principals and one associate: Mandy Boam, Zacharia Lester, Rob Beusan, Brian Coleman, Brian Riopelle and Gwen Andrews. Beusan additionally is director of design, and Boam is the firm's first woman principal.

The firm's work has won design awards from the local and national bodies of the American Institute of Architects and other organizations.

== History ==
In September 1890, John E. Tourtellotte (1869-1939), a native of Connecticut, moved westward and arrived in Boise and established a practice as a "contracting architect," or architect and contractor. In 1894 he eliminated contracting from his practice and was thereafter exclusively an architect. In 1901 he formed the partnership of J. E. Tourtellotte & Company with Charles F. Hummel, a German-born architect who had been working in Boise since 1895. Hummel became a named partner in 1910 when the firm was reorganized as Tourtellotte & Hummel.

The firm quickly emerged as the leading architects in Boise and Idaho. Tourtellotte was particularly successful as a salesman for his firm's work, while Hummel is assumed to have been the chief designer. According to their biographers, "[a] good share of the firm's success must be credited to John Tourtellotte. He would not have been so successful had he not been a good architect, occasionally a very good architect, and had he not associated himself with an even better one. But the importance of his powers of salesmanship should never be underestimated." In 1912 they completed their exceptional work of architectural design / drawings, on the Idaho State Capitol, which was under construction for 15 years, 1905-1920. The following year of 1913 Tourtellotte moved further west to Portland, Oregon, to establish a second office in the largest city and seaport in the adjacent state with a much larger population and commercial opportunities to draw from for the firm, with Hummel remaining in Boise.

Hummel's two sons, Frederick C. Hummel and Frank K. Hummel, were both educated at the University of Pennsylvania and joined the firm in 1909 and seven years later in 1916, respectively. In 1922 the original partnership was dissolved and two new partnerships were formed: in Portland by Tourtellotte and Frank Hummel and in Boise by Charles and other son, Frederick Hummel, with a minor share kept by Tourtellotte, who assumed the responsibility of promotion for both offices. In Portland, Tourtellotte developed a new specialty in hotel architectural design, and with Frank was responsible for the John Jacob Astor Hotel (1924) in Astoria, Oregon, and others in the state of the Ashland Springs Hotel (1925) in Ashland, the Redwoods Hotel (1926) in Grants Pass, the Baker City Tower (1929) in Baker City and the Hoff Building (1930), back in Boise. In Boise, Charles and Frederick pursued a mostly stylistically conservative general practice. The most visible exception was the distinctive Egyptian Theatre (1927), designed by Frederick. In 1935 Frederick left the firm to join the new Federal Housing Administration in the New Deal programs of the new presidential administration of 32nd President, Franklin D. Roosevelt (1882-1945, served 1933-1945), and Frank withdrew from the Portland partnership to return to Boise. In Portland, Frank had developed a taste for the increasingly popular Art Deco design, symbolic of the 1920s and 1930s decades, having been chief designer of the Hoff Building, which heavily influenced the work of the firm for the rest of the decade. Charles Hummel died in 1939, and three years later in 1942 Frank closed the office for the duration of the Second World War (1939/1941-1945). In 1945 the office for the firm was reorganized and reopened under the name of Hummel, Hummel & Jones, the two brothers having been joined by Jedd Jones III. Frederick did not return to the firm full-time until two years later in 1947.

Frank K. Hummel died in 1961 and the following year in 1962 the firm was reorganized under the name of Hummel, Hummel, Jones & Shawver to include new architects Chet Shawver and Charles Hummel, son of Frederick C. Hummel. In 1977, with the retirement of Frederick and the addition of architect Nelson Miller, the firm was incorporated as Hummel, Jones, Shawver & Miller PA. Frederick died in 1978. In 1980 it became Hummel Jones Miller Hunsucker PA with the addition of Wayne Hunsucker. In 1984 the firm merged with Dropping, Kelley & LaMarche to form Hummel/Dropping Architects PA. It was renamed Hummel, LaMarche & Hunsucker Architects PA in 1985, Hummel Hunsucker Architects PA in 1995 and lastly Hummel Architects PA later the same year. From 1922 to 2002, excepting the years 1977 to 1981, when it was led by Jones, the firm was led continuously by the Hummel family. In 2003 it was reincorporated as a PLLC.

== Legacy ==
Idaho architects Ralph Loring and Benjamin Morgan Nisbet worked for Tourtellotte before establishing their independent practices.

Van Evera Bailey.

In 1982 139 works completed by Tourtellotte, J. E. Tourtellotte & Company and Tourtellotte & Hummel were listed on the United States National Register of Historic Places as part of a Thematic Resource. Historian Patricia Wright selected the nominated sites based on a complete review of the firm's work from its founding until its closure during World War II. Before and 1982, additional works have been NRHP-listed.

In 1987 Wright and Lisa B. Reitzes were the authors of Tourtellotte & Hummel of Idaho: The Standard Practice of Architecture, published by the Utah State University Press, which consists of a history of the firm, details of major works and a complete catalog of projects. Members of the Hummel family, especially Charles Hummel, made a point of preserving the firm's records. In 2024 Hummel Architects donated their archive, dating back to 1896, to the Idaho State Historical Society.

== Historic partner biographies ==
=== Charles F. Hummel ===
Charles Frederick Hummel (April 12, 1857 – September 17, 1939) was born in Gernsbach in the former Grand Duchy of Baden, now part of Germany. He was educated at an unidentified technical school in Stuttgart, graduating in 1879. He then worked as a draftsman in Freiburg until 1885, when he immigrated to the United States. He initially worked as a carpenter in Chicago and Saint Paul, Minnesota, before moving on to Tacoma, Washington in 1888. There and in Seattle and Everett he worked as an architect, contractor and builder. He settled in Boise in 1895, where he continued the same work. His independent work as an architect includes the Thomas C. Galloway House (1900) in Weiser.

In 1882 Hummel was married to Marie Conrad. They had four children, three sons and one daughter. His two younger sons joined him in the family business. Hummel died in Boise at the age of 82.

=== Frederick C. Hummel ===
Frederick Charles Hummel FAIA (September 9, 1884 – August 16, 1978) was born in Renchen, about 35 miles from Gernsbach, to Charles F. Hummel and Marie Hummel, née Conrad. He was educated at the University of Pennsylvania, earning a certificate in architecture in 1909. He then joined the office of J. E. Tourtellotte & Company as a draftsman, and was later promoted to chief draftsman of Tourtellotte & Hummel. During World War I he served in with the Idaho national guard.

Hummel was instrumental in the passage of an architectural registration law in Idaho in 1917 and served on the board of examiners from 1920 until 1961. He was a member of the Boise board of adjustmenent and zoning board of appeals and was affiliated with the Federal Housing Administration from 1935 until 1947. Hummel joined the American Institute of Architects in 1950 and in 1951 was a charter member of the Idaho chapter. In 1961 he was elected a Fellow of the AIA in recognition of his public service; he was the first Idaho architect to be elected a Fellow.

Hummel was married to Mary McAndrews in 1923. They had one son, Charles, who followed his father into the family firm. He was involved in local veterans and fraternal organizations and was a parishioner of the cathedral parish. He died in Boise at the age of 93.

=== Charles Hummel ===
Charles Frederick Hummel FAIA (June 21, 1925 – October 22, 2016) was born in Boise to Frederick C. Hummel and Mary Hummel, née McAndrews. He was educated at the Catholic University of America, graduating in 1950 with a BArch, followed by graduate study at Columbia University. During World War II he served in the army and during the Korean War with the corps of engineers. In 1953 he returned to Boise to join the family firm, where he spent his entire career. The work he was most proud of was the James A. McClure Federal Building and United States Courthouse (1968), which was NRHP-listed in 2019. He retired from full-time practice in 2002.

Like his father he was involved in public service in Boise. He was particularly interested in historic preservation and worked for the preservation of important sites, including many designed by his family. In 2002 Boise mayor H. Brent Coles proclaimed July 11 to be "Charles Hummel Day." In 2006 he was awarded a Governor’s Award in the Arts for lifetime achievement and in 2007 he was awarded the Making History Award from the Ada County Board of Commissioners. He was elected a Fellow of the AIA in 1984, and in 2000 he was awarded the inaugural Gold Medal of Honor from AIA Idaho.

Hummel was married in 1951 to Calista Frances Ward. They had four children, two sons and two daughters. Also like his father he was involved in local veterans and fraternal organizations and was a parishioner of the cathedral parish. He died in Boise at the age of 91.

== Representative Works ==
(this list is not comprehensive)

=== J. E. Tourtellotte & Company, 1901–1910 ===
- 1905 – Overland Building, 202 N 9th St, Boise, Idaho
  - Destroyed by fire in 1987.
- 1908 - Boise High School, 1010 W. Washington Street, Boise, Idaho

=== Tourtellotte & Hummel, 1910–1942 ===
- 1910 – John Daly House, 1015 W Hays St, Boise, Idaho
- 1910 – Eichelberger Apartments, 612-624 N 9th St, Boise, Idaho
- 1910 – J. H. Gakey House, 1402 W Franklin St, Boise, Idaho
- 1910 – Immanuel Methodist Episcopal Church, 1406 W Eastman St, Boise, Idaho
- 1910 – Nampa Department Store, 1307 1st St S, Nampa, Idaho
  - Expanded in 1919. A contributing resource to the NRHP-listed Nampa Historic District.
- 1910 – Owyhee Hotel, 1109 W Main St, Boise, Idaho
- 1911 – Bruneau Episcopal Church, Benham Rd and Ruth St, Bruneau, Idaho
- 1911 – Chinese Odd Fellows Building, 610-612 Front St, Boise, Idaho
- 1911 – M. J. Marks House, 1001 W Hays St, Boise, Idaho
- 1911 – John Parker House, 713 W Franklin St, Boise, Idaho
- 1911 – St. Agnes Catholic Church, 204 E Liberty St, Weiser, Idaho
- 1912 – Collister School, 4426 Catalpa Dr, Boise, Idaho
- 1912 – William Sidenfaden House, 906 W Franklin St, Boise, Idaho
- 1912 – Edward Welch House, 1321 E Jefferson St, Boise, Idaho
- 1912 – Zurcher Apartments, 102 S 17th St, Boise, Idaho
- 1913 – Boise City National Bank Building additions, 805 W Idaho St, Boise, Idaho
- 1913 – E. F. Hunt House, 49 E State St, Meridian, Idaho
- 1913 – J.W. Jones Building, 104 Main St. NE, Blackfoot, Idaho
  - Demolished, formerly NRHP-listed.
- 1914 – Elks Temple, 310 Jefferson St, Boise, Idaho
- 1914 – Gorby Opera Theater, 128 E. Idaho Ave., Glenns Ferry, Idaho
- 1914 – O'Neill Brothers Building, 36 E Idaho Ave, Glenns Ferry, Idaho
- 1914 – South Boise Fire Station, 1011 Williams St, Boise, Idaho
- 1914 – St. Charles Borromeo Catholic Church, 311 S 1st Ave, Hailey, Idaho
- 1915 – Our Lady of Limerick Catholic Church, 113 W Arthur Ave, Glenns Ferry, Idaho
- 1915 – Adolph Schreiber House, 524 W Franklin St, Boise, Idaho
- 1915 – Louis Stephan House, 1709 N 18th St, Boise, Idaho
- 1916 – F. P. Ake Building, 106-172 Main St, Mountain Home, Idaho
- 1916 – Echo City Hall, 20 S Bonanza St, Echo, Oregon
- 1916 – Wasco School, 903 Barnett St, Wasco, Oregon
- 1916 – Sacred Hearts of Jesus and Mary Church, 608 7th St, Parma, Idaho
  - Demolished, formerly NRHP-listed.
- 1917 – H. H. Bryant Garage, 11th and Front Sts, Boise, Idaho
  - Demolished circa 1990, formerly NRHP-listed.
- 1917 – Idaho State Sanitarium Administration Building, 11th Ave N, Nampa, Idaho
- 1917 – Main building, Gooding College, Gooding, Idaho
  - Demolished. Formerly a contributing resource to the NRHP-listed Gooding College Campus historic district.
- 1917 – Pilot Butte Inn, 1121 Wall St, Bend, Oregon
  - Demolished in 1973, formerly NRHP-listed.
- 1918 – Butterfield Livestock Company House, Jenkins Creek Rd, Weiser, Idaho
- 1918 – Nampa Presbyterian Church, 2nd St and 15th Ave S, Nampa, Idaho
- 1918 – H. R. Neitzel House, 705 N 9th St, Boise, Idaho
- 1919 – E. H. Dewey Stores, 1013-1015 1st St S, Nampa, Idaho
- 1919 – Farmers and Merchants Bank Building, 101 11th Ave S, Nampa, Idaho
- 1919 – Nampa and Meridian Irrigation District Office, 1503 1st St S, Nampa, Idaho
- 1920 – Caldwell Odd Fellow Home for the Aged, N 14th Ave, Caldwell, Idaho
- 1920 – Dormitory building, Gooding College, Gooding, Idaho
  - A contributing resource to the NRHP-listed Gooding College Campus historic district. Now the Gooding University Inn.
- 1920 – Pedro Echevarria House, 5605 W. State St., Boise, Idaho
- 1920 – New Plymouth Congregational Church, 207 Southwest Ave., New Plymouth, Idaho
- 1921 – Cathedral of St. John the Evangelist, 707 N 8th St, Boise, Idaho
- 1921 – Father Lobell House, 125 N 4th St E, Mountain Home, Idaho
  - Demolished circa 2010, formerly NRHP-listed.
- 1921 – Roswell Grade School, ID-18 and Stephan Ln, Roswell, Idaho
- 1921 – St. Alphonsus' Hospital Nurses' Home, 341 W Washington St, Boise, Idaho
- 1922 – Hotel North Bend, 768 Virginia St, North Bend, Oregon
- 1922 – J. S. McGinnis Building, 79 N Commercial St, Glenns Ferry, Idaho
- 1922 – Nampa First Methodist Episcopal Church, 404 12th Ave, Nampa, Idaho
- 1923 – William Dunbar House, 1500 W Hays St, Boise, Idaho
- 1923 – Marshfield City Hall (former), 375 Central Ave, Coos Bay, Oregon
- 1923 – St. Paul's Rectory and Sisters' House, 810 15th Ave S, Nampa, Idaho
  - Demolished, formerly NRHP-listed.
- 1924 – John Jacob Astor Hotel, 342 14th St, Astoria, Oregon
- 1924 – H. C. Burnett House, 124 W Bannock St, Boise, Idaho
- 1924 – Coos Bay National Bank Building, 201 Central Ave, Coos Bay, Oregon
- 1924 – Idaho State Industrial School Women's Dormitory, 2266 E 600 N, St. Anthony, Idaho
- 1925 – Ashland Springs Hotel, 212 E Main St, Ashland, Oregon
- 1925 – St. Joseph's Catholic School, 825 W Fort St, Boise, Idaho
  - A contributing to the NRHP-listed St. John's Cathedral Block historic district.
- 1925 – St. Mary's Catholic Church, 616 Dearborn St, Caldwell, Idaho
- 1926 – Franklin School, 5007 Franklin Rd, Boise, Idaho
  - Demolished, formerly NRHP-listed.
- 1926 – Redwoods Hotel, 310 NW 6th St, Grants Pass, Oregon
- 1927 – Egyptian Theater, 700 W Main St, Boise, Idaho
- 1927 – Samuel Hays House remodeling, 612 W Franklin St, Boise, Idaho
- 1927 - Store Building for Ida M. Wiley, 9138 SE Woodstock, Portland, Oregon
- 1928 – J. C. Palumbo Fruit Company Packing and Warehouse Building, 633 2nd Ave S, Payette, Idaho
- 1928 – Church of the Sacred Heart, 211 E 1st St, Emmett, Idaho
- 1928 – St. Joseph's Catholic Church, 1st Ave and Cedar St, Bovill, Idaho
- 1928 – John Tourtellotte Building, 210-222 N 10th St, Boise, Idaho
- 1929 – Baker City Tower, 1701 Main St, Baker City, Oregon
- 1929 – Bald Mountain Hot Springs, 180 N. Main St, Ketchum, Idaho
  - Demolished, formerly NRHP-listed.
- 1929 – Billings Memorial Gymnasium, Intermountain Institute, Weiser, Idaho
  - A contributing resource to the NRHP-listed Intermountain Institute historic district.
- 1929 – Garfield School, 1914 Broadway Ave, Boise, Idaho
- 1929 – Wellman Apartments, 500 W Franklin St, Boise, Idaho
- 1930 – St. Mary's Catholic Church, 618 E 1st St, Moscow, Idaho
- 1930 - Hotel Boise (Hoff Building), 802 W. Bannock Street, Boise, Idaho
- 1931 – Nampa American Legion Chateau, 1508 2nd St S, Nampa, Idaho
- 1932 – Orville Jackson House, 127 S Eagle Rd, Eagle, Idaho
- 1932 – Pine Creek Baptist Church, 210 Main St, Pinehurst, Idaho
- 1933 – United States Post Office, 106 W Main St, Weiser, Idaho
- 1934 – Main School (former), 800 Cushman St, Fairbanks, Alaska
- 1936 – Owyhee County Courthouse, 20381 State Hwy 78, Murphy, Idaho
- 1937 – Boise Junior High School, 1105 N 13th St, Boise, Idaho
- 1937 – Cole School gymnasium, 7145 Fairview Ave, Boise, Idaho
  - Demolished, formerly NRHP-listed.
- 1937 – Guernsey Dairy Milk Depot, 2419 W State St, Boise, Idaho
- 1937 – Morris Hill Cemetery Mausoleum, Morris Hill Cemetery, Boise, Idaho
- 1937 – St. Mary's Catholic Church, 2604 W State St, Boise, Idaho
- 1937 – Whitney School additions, 1609 S Owyhee St, Boise, Idaho
  - Demolished, formerly NRHP-listed.
- 1938 – Gem County Courthouse, Main St and McKinley Ave, Emmett, Idaho
- 1939 – Ada County Courthouse (former), 514 W Jefferson St, Boise, Idaho
  - Designed by Tourtellotte & Hummel and Wayland & Fennell, associated architects, but principally designed by Wayland & Fennell. A contributing resource to the NRHP-listed Boise Capitol Area District.
- 1939 – John Regan American Legion Hall, 401 W Idaho St, Boise, Idaho
- 1939 – Thompson Mortuary Chapel, 737 Main St, Gooding, Idaho
- 1939 – Washington County Courthouse, 256 E Court St, Weiser, Idaho
- 1940 – Administration Building, Boise State University, Boise, Idaho
  - Designed by Tourtellotte & Hummel and Wayland & Fennell, associated architects, but principally designed by Tourtellotte & Hummel. NRHP-listed.
- 1941 – West Point Grade School, E 3300 S, Wendell, Idaho

=== Hummel, Hummel & Jones, 1945–1962 ===
- 1948 – Holy Rosary Church, 288 E 9th St, Idaho Falls, Idaho
  - NRHP-listed.
- 1952 – Mountain States Telephone and Telegraph Company building, 218 N Capitol Blvd, Boise, Idaho
- 1956 – First Security Bank building, 121 N 9th St, Boise, Idaho
- 1957 – Idaho Department of Labor administration building, 317 W Main St, Boise, Idaho
- 1960 – Cathedral of the Rockies, 717 N 11th St, Boise, Idaho
  - Designed by Harold E. Wagoner, architect, with Hummel, Hummel & Jones, associate architects.
- 1961 – Idaho Transportation Department administration building, 3311 W State St, Boise, Idaho
  - Designed by Hummel, Hummel & Jones and Wayland & Cline, associated architects.
- 1962 – Blue Cross of Idaho building, 1501 W Federal Way, Boise, Idaho
  - Expanded and altered, now home to the offices of the Roman Catholic Diocese of Boise.
- 1962 – Jewett Auditorium and Chapel, College of Idaho, Caldwell, Idaho

=== Hummel, Hummel, Jones & Shawver, 1962–1977 ===
- 1964 – Albertsons Library, Boise State University, Boise, Idaho
- 1964 – Bishop Kelly High School, 7009 W Franklin Rd, Boise, Idaho
- 1964 – Our Lady of the Lake Catholic Church, 83638 Cross Rd, McCall, Idaho
- 1966 – Art and Architecture Building, University of Idaho, Moscow, Idaho
- 1967 – Liberal Arts Building, Boise State University, Boise, Idaho
- 1967 – Student Union Building, Boise State University, Boise, Idaho
- 1968 – James A. McClure Federal Building and United States Courthouse, 550 W Fort St, Boise, Idaho
  - NRHP-listed.
- 1969 – Education Building, University of Idaho, Moscow, Idaho
- 1971 – Natural Resources Building, University of Idaho, Moscow, Idaho
- 1974 – Continental Life and Accident Company building, 1001 W Main St, Boise, Idaho
  - Altered.
- 1976 – Joe R. Williams Building, 700 W State St, Boise, Idaho
  - Colloquially known as the Hall of Mirrors for its reflective facade.

=== Hummel, Jones, Shawver & Miller, 1977–1980 ===
- 1982 – First Security Place, 901 W Bannock St, Boise, Idaho
- 1984 - Salmon River Resort Club (Polly Bemis Ranch Cabins, club house and library) McCall, ID

=== Hummel, LaMarche & Hunsucker Architects, 1985–1995 ===
- 1988 – Capitol Terrace, 770 W Main St, Boise, Idaho
- 1990 – Boise Centre, 850 W Front St, Boise, Idaho
- 1990 – Idaho Department of Environmental Quality administration building, 1410 N Hilton St, Boise, Idaho

=== Hummel Architects, from 1995 ===
- 1999 - Hidden Springs Community Fire Station (Eagle Fire Station No. 5), 5871 W Hidden Springs Drive Boise, Idaho
- 2003 – Our Lady of the Valley Catholic Church, 1122 W Linden St, Caldwell, Idaho
  - Replaced St. Mary's Catholic Church, designed by Tourtellotte & Hummel and completed in 1925.
- 2004 - Idaho State University Stephens Performing Arts Center, Pocatello Campus Pocatello, Idaho
- 2009 - Canyon Ridge High School Twin Falls School District, 300 N. College Road W. Twin Falls, Idaho
- 2009 - Renaissance High School, West Ada School District, 1307 E. Central Drive, Meridian, Idaho
- 2012 - Boise State University, College of Business & Economics, Boise Campus Boise, Idaho (with Anderson Mason Dale)
- 2016 - Boise State University, Micron Center for Materials Research, Boise Campus Boise, Idaho (with Anderson Mason Dale)
- 2016 - Hillsdale Elementary School, West Ada School District,5225 S Stockenham Way Meridian, Idaho
- 2017 - Twin Falls City Hall, 203 Main Avenue E, Twin Falls, Idaho
- 2018 - Thunder Ridge High School (Bonneville School District 93), 4941 1st Street Idaho Falls, Idaho
- 2018 - South Meridian Family YMCA, 5155 S. Hillsdale Avenue Meridian, Idaho (with BRSA)
- 2019 - Boise Fire Department, Fire Station No. 9, 3101 Sycamore Drive, Boise, Idaho (with Rice Fergus Miller)
- 2019 - St. Luke's Idaho Elk's Children's Pavilion, 305 E Jefferson, Boise, Idaho
- 2020 - Lightcast Headquarters (formerly Emsi), 232 N. Almon Street Moscow, Idaho
- 2024 - Alpine Academy Middle School, 1195 Alpine Avenue Chubbuck, Idaho
- 2024 - Boise Fire Department, Fire Station No. 5, 212 S. 16th Street Boise, Idaho (with Rice Fergus Miller)
- 2024 - St. Luke's Center for Orthopedic Sports Medicine, 2619 W Fairview Avenue Boise, Idaho
- 2025 - Boise State University, Syringa Hall, Boise Campus Boise, Idaho
