= John Tourtellotte Building =

U.S. historic building

- Tourtellotte, John, Building
- U.S. National Register of Historic Places
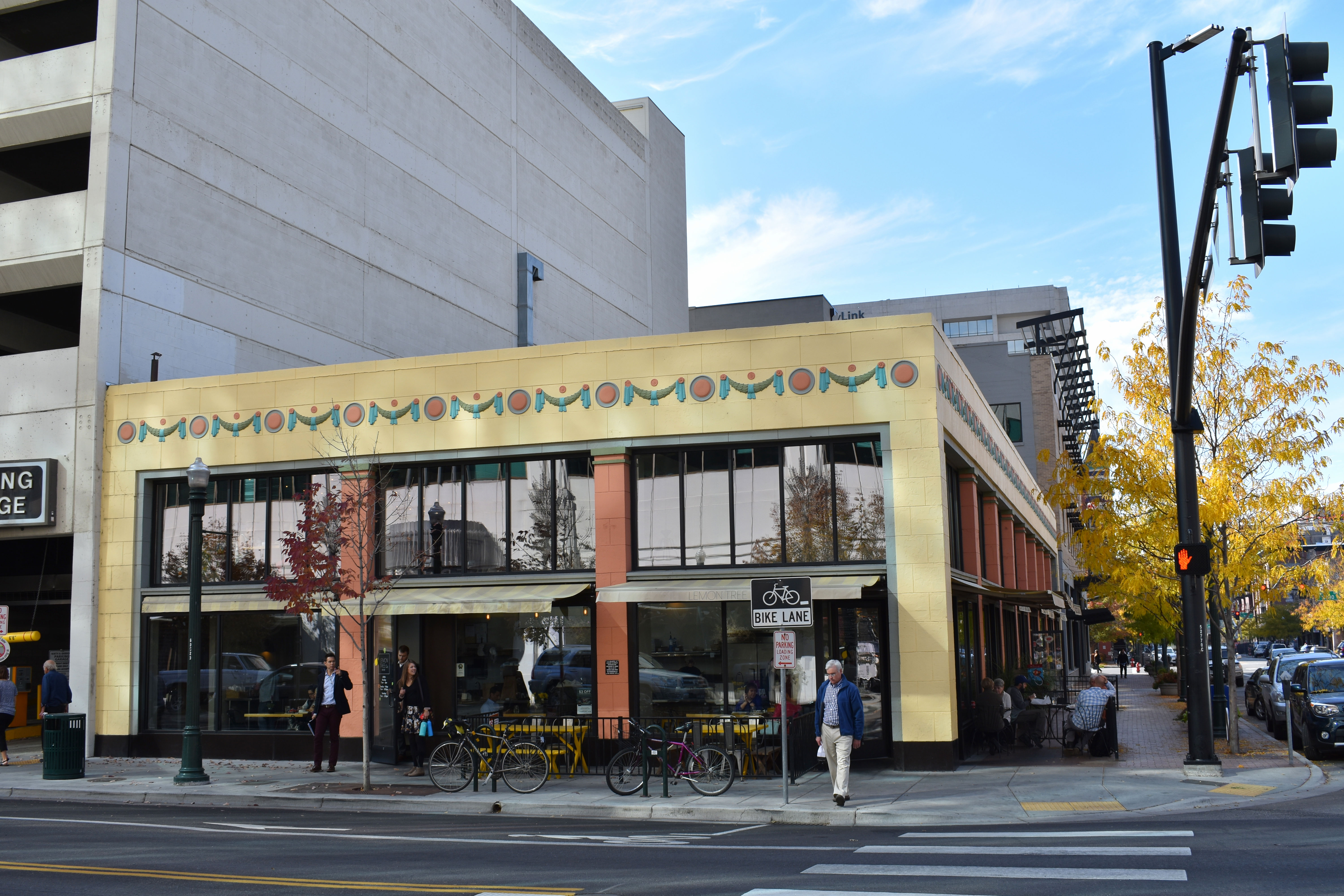
- The John Tourtellotte Building in 2018

- Location within Idaho Location within the United States
- Location: 210-222 N. 10th St., Boise, Idaho
- Coordinates: 43°37′05″N 116°12′12″W
- Area: less than one acre
- Built: 1927
- Architect: Tourtellotte & Hummel
- MPS: Tourtellotte and Hummel Architecture TR
- NRHP reference No.: 82000249
- Added to NRHP: November 17, 1982

The John Tourtellotte Building in Boise, Idaho, is a 1-story, reinforced concrete commercial space designed by Tourtellotte and Hummel and constructed in 1928. Plans for the building were drawn at the firm's Portland office with some participation from local Tourtellotte & Hummel architects. The building was added to the National Register of Historic Places in 1982, and its nomination form describes the structure as representing "the classicizing impulse of the 1920s in interaction with new structural systems and the functional aesthetic which accompanied them." The Tourtellotte Building is veneered with cast panels placed to resemble stone blocks, and the upper facade includes a "continuous frieze of swags and discs."

At the time of construction of the John Tourtellotte Building, John Tourtellotte had been living and working in Portland, but the Boise office, managed by partner Frederick Hummel, continued to be a major influence in local architectural development.

== See also ==
- John E. Tourtellotte
