= J. H. Gakey House =

Historic building in Boise, Idaho

- U.S. National Register of Historic Places
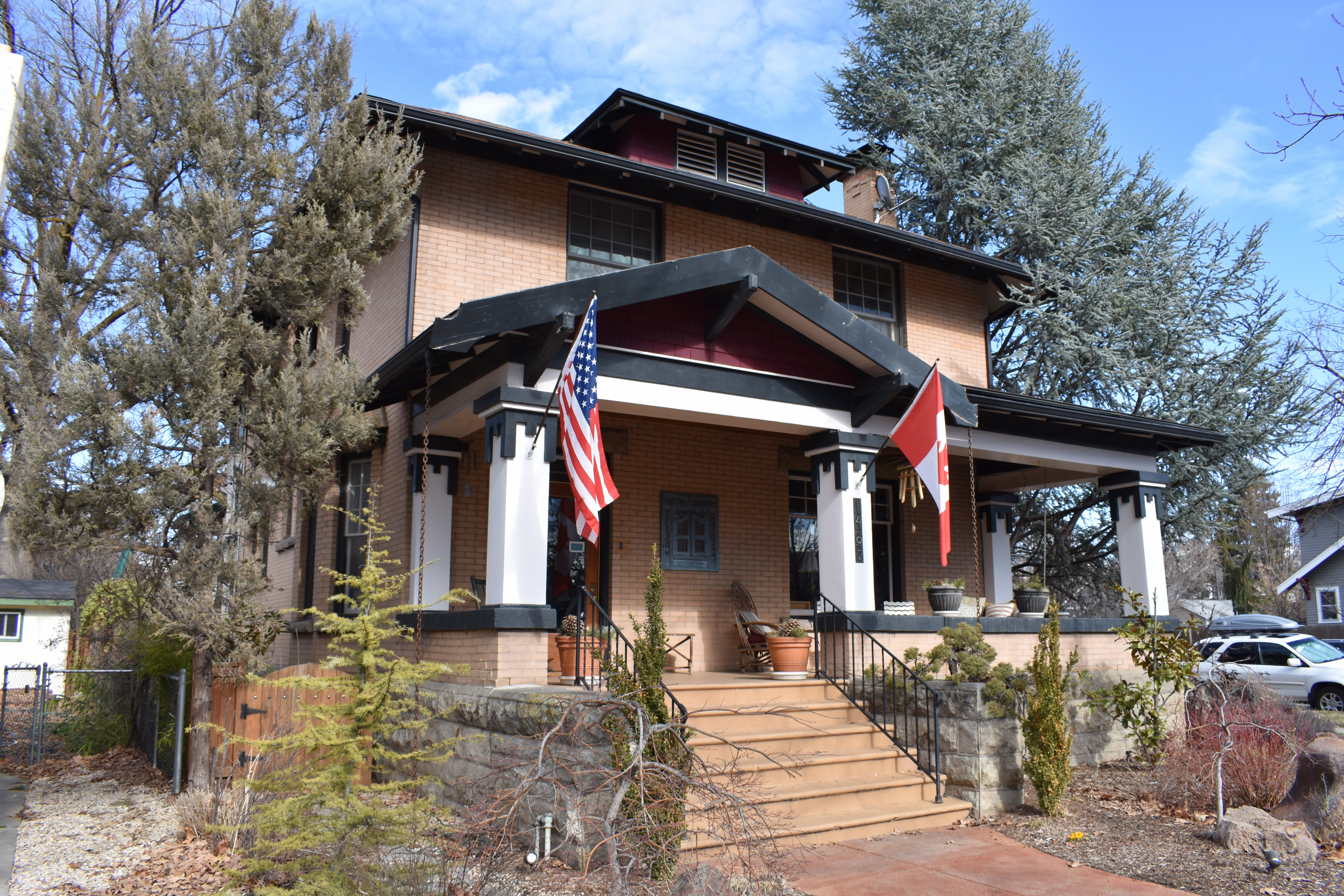
- The J.H. Gakey House in 2019

- Location within Idaho Location within the United States
- Location: 1402 Franklin St., Boise, Idaho
- Coordinates: 43°37′27″N 116°12′19″W
- Area: less than one acre
- Built: 1910
- Built by: Lemon & Doolittle
- Architect: Tourtellotte & Hummel
- Architectural style: Bungalow/craftsman
- MPS: Tourtellotte and Hummel Architecture TR
- NRHP reference No.: 82000203
- Added to NRHP: November 17, 1982

The J.H. Gakey House in Boise, Idaho, is a 2-story brick Bungalow designed by Tourtellotte & Hummel and constructed by Lemon & Doolittle in 1910. The house features a sandstone foundation and a hip roof with attic dormers. Lintels and window sills are trimmed with stone. The house includes a large, cross facade porch with square posts decorated by geometric ornaments below the capitals. The Gakey house was added to the National Register of Historic Places in 1982.

In 1910 the Idaho Statesman described the house as "one of the first of its kind in the city." The newspaper noted wide overhanging eaves to protect second floor windows from direct sunlight, natural ventilation, and air pockets behind the brick veneer to keep the house warm and dry in winter. The house included pieces of built in furniture.

== John H. Gakey ==
John H. Gakey (December 17, 1864—May 8, 1953) arrived in Boise City in 1882, having moved from Cheyenne, Wyoming. Although a resident of Boise, Gakey owned a large sheep ranch near Nampa.

Gakey married Martha Elizabeth Baker in Boise in 1886. By 1910, the year of construction of the J.H. Gakey House, Mrs. Gakey was being treated for stomach cancer, and she died of the disease before the Gakeys could occupy their new home. John Gakey never lived in the house, and he sold it to its first occupant, Frank Blackinger, in 1911.

Gakey was remarried in 1918 to Elizabeth Lynch in Boise, and the Gakeys later sold their Nampa ranch and moved to Napa, California, in 1947. John Gakey died in Napa in 1953.

In the early 20th century, a stop on the Boise Interurban Railway, Southern Division, was named "Gakey" in reference to its proximity to the John Gakey ranch near Nampa.

== See also ==
- American Foursquare architecture
