= Nampa Historic District =

Historic district in Idaho, United States

- U.S. National Register of Historic Places
- U.S. Historic district
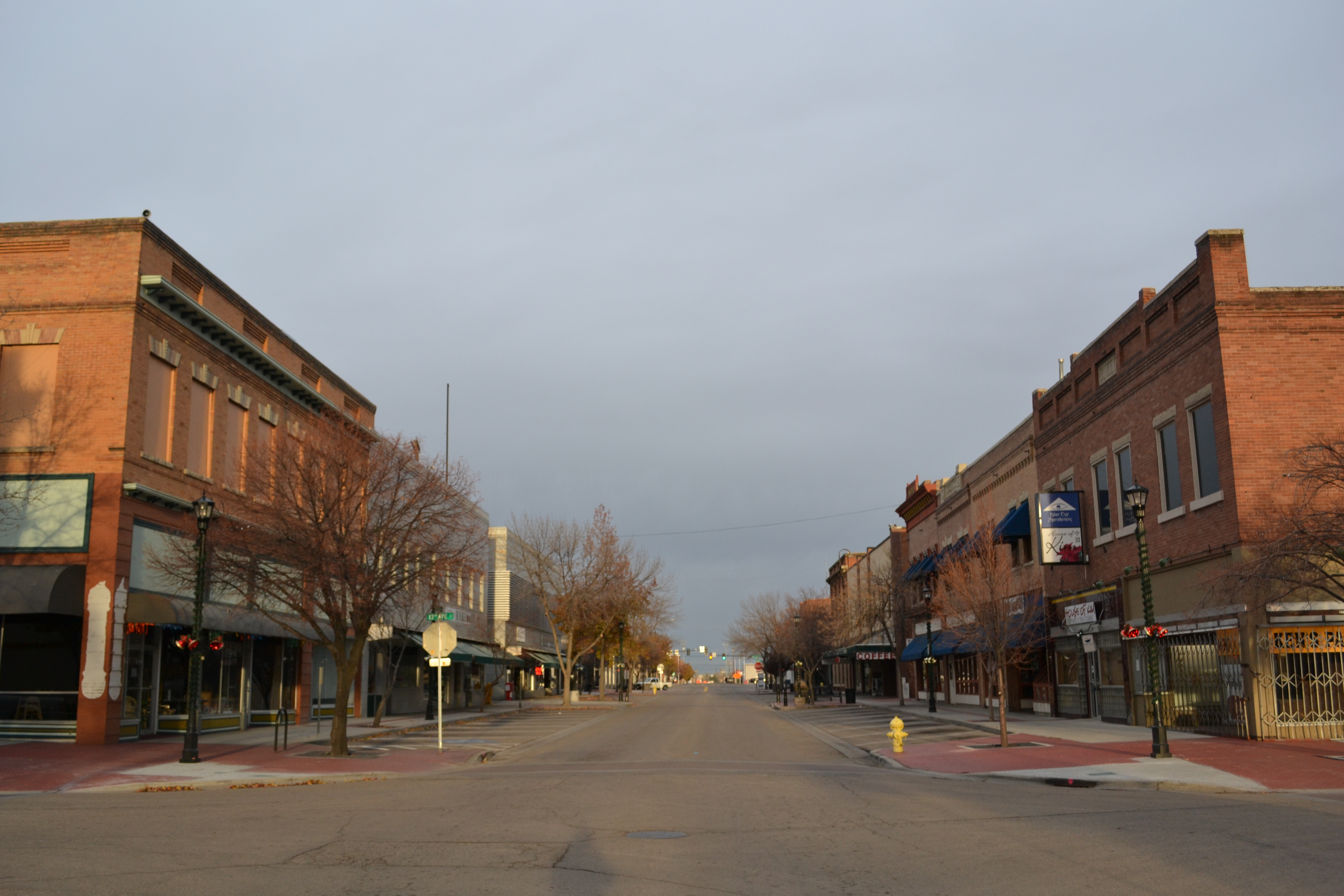

- Location within Idaho Location within the United States
- Location: 1200 and 1300 blocks S. 1st St., Nampa, Idaho
- Coordinates: 43°34′41″N 116°33′28″W
- Area: 3 acres (1.2 ha)
- Architect: Tourtellotte & Hummel
- Architectural style: Renaissance
- NRHP reference No.: 83000284
- Added to NRHP: August 18, 1983

The Nampa Historic District is a 3-acre (1.2 ha) historic district in Nampa, Idaho that was listed on the National Register of Historic Places in 1983. The listing included 10 contributing buildings.

Its National Register nomination described:

The district is historically significant for its association with Nampa's commercial development during the period 1905 through 1920, a major period of growth during which Nampa's main street, First Street South, gained a full complement of two-story brick business blocks.

It includes part or all of the 1200 and 1300 blocks of S. 1st St. in Nampa, and it includes work by architects Tourtellotte & Hummel. Tourtellotte & Hummel designed the one-story Nampa Department Store (1919) in the 1300 block, also the two-story Nampa Department Store at 1307 First Street South (1910).

== Nampa Fire of 1909 ==
Most of the survey's ten contributing properties were constructed after July 3, 1909, when a fire destroyed the downtown commercial area bounded by First and Front Streets and Twelfth and Thirteenth Avenues. The fire burned for three hours after a customer at the Arnold Cigar Store ignited fireworks on display inside the store.
