= Bald Mountain Hot Springs =

- U.S. National Register of Historic Places
- Location within Idaho Location within the United States
- Location: Main and 1st St., Ketchum, Idaho
- Coordinates: 43°40′44″N 114°21′42″W
- Area: 2 acres (0.81 ha)
- Built: 1929
- Architect: Tourtellotte & Hummel
- Architectural style: Rustic-style
- MPS: Tourtellotte and Hummel Architecture TR
- NRHP reference No.: 82000320
- Added to NRHP: November 17, 1982

Bald Mountain Hot Springs in Ketchum, Idaho was a historic resort. Located at Main and 1st St. in Ketchum, the complex was listed on the National Register of Historic Places in 1982. In 2003, plans had been approved for a new 80-room hotel complex on the site.

The original complex was built as the Bald Mountain Hot Springs Motel in 1929 by Carl E. Brandt, manager of the J.C. Penney store in Hailey, Idaho, who had bought a different, decrepit hot spring resort enterprise northwest of Ketchum in 1927. Rather than fixing that up, he moved the hot water to the new resort location on Main Street in Ketchum. The resort included Rustic-style architecture and work by architects Tourtellotte & Hummel. It included the C. E. Brandt Residence, tourist cabins, and the natatorium where people swam in hot springs water piped in from three miles away.

While the original resort was planned to have 30 tourist cabins, the NRHP listing included just five contributing buildings and one contributing structure on 2 acres (0.81 ha). In 2003, three of the historic structures had been moved to a hunting club location near Hagerman, Idaho.
