= Immanuel Methodist Episcopal Church =

Historic church in Idaho, United States

- U.S. National Register of Historic Places
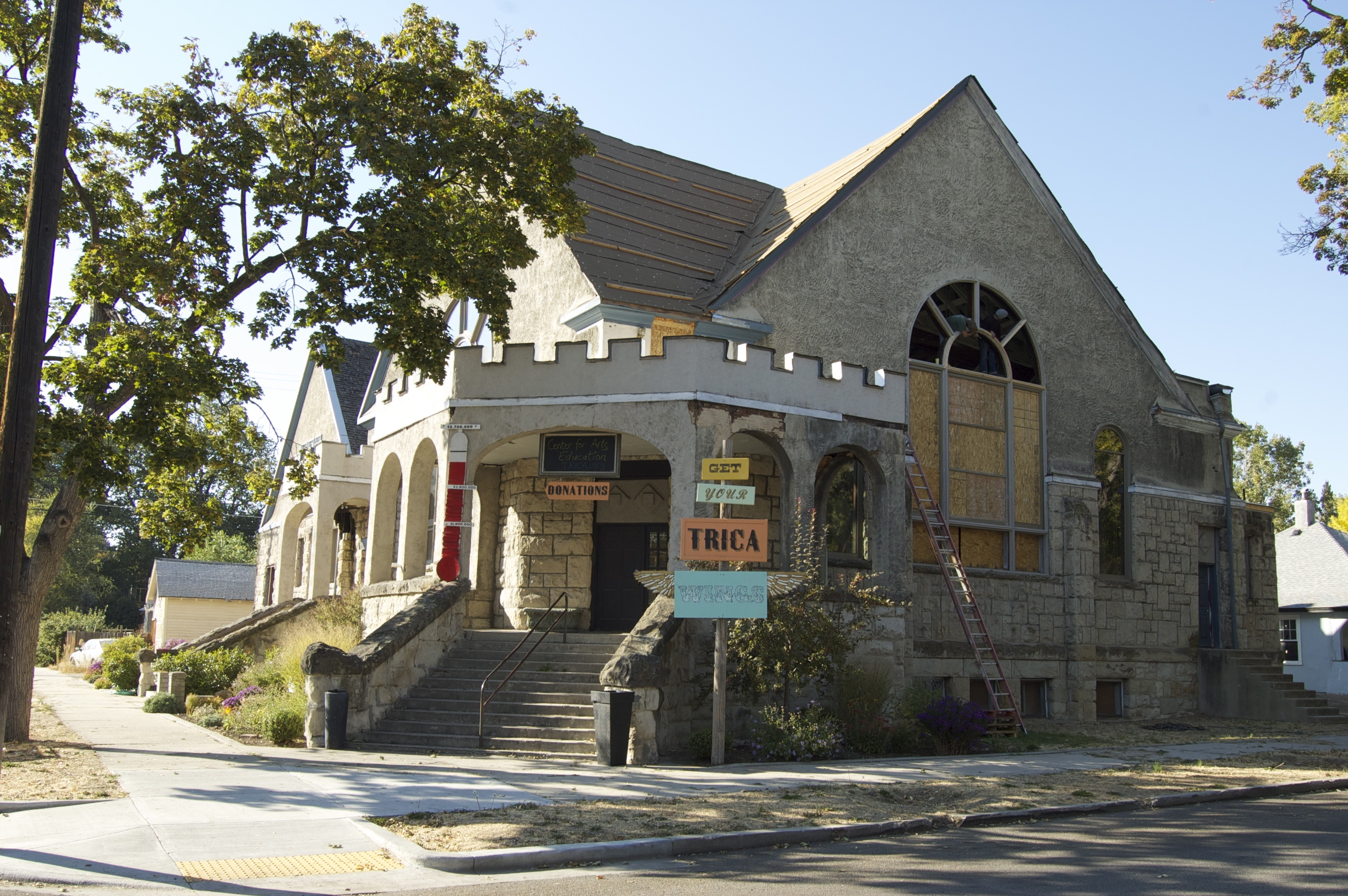

- Location within Idaho Location within the United States
- Location: 1406 West Eastman Street, Boise, Idaho
- Coordinates: 43°37′50″N 116°12′14″W
- Area: less than one acre
- Built: 1910
- Architect: Tourtellotte & Hummel
- Architectural style: Romanesque, Romanesque Eclectic
- MPS: Tourtellotte and Hummel Architecture TR
- NRHP reference No.: 82000212
- Added to NRHP: November 17, 1982

The Immanuel Methodist Episcopal Church is a historic church at 1406 West Eastman Street in Boise, Idaho. It was started in 1910 and was added to the National Register in 1982.

It was designed by Tourtellotte & Hummel and is relatively unusual among their designs for its "Romanesque flavor". It is described as architecturally mixed: "architecturally significant as an ecclesiastical structure showing an interesting hybridization of traditional, medieval forms (round arches and crenellation) with classical elements (eave returns) and a horizontality and breadth of gable which may be attributed, as may a good deal of the architecture of this period, to the influence of the bungalow and related styles."
