= Pine Creek Baptist Church =

- U.S. National Register of Historic Places
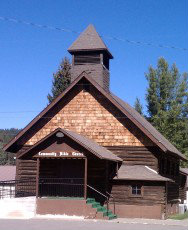

- Location within Idaho Location within the United States
- Location: Main and S. 3rd Sts., Pinehurst, Idaho
- Coordinates: 47.53871°N 116.23684°W
- Area: less than one acre
- Built: 1932
- Architect: Tourtellotte & Hummel
- Architectural style: Nostalgic log cabin revival
- MPS: Tourtellotte and Hummel Architecture TR
- NRHP reference No.: 82000361
- Added to NRHP: November 17, 1982

The Pine Creek Baptist Church in Pinehurst, Idaho, also known as the Pinehurst Baptist Church, was designed by architects Tourtellotte & Hummel in "nostalgic log cabin revival" style, and was built in 1932. It was listed on the National Register of Historic Places in 1982.

The church is built with full dove-tail joints at corners of its log walls.

It was listed on the National Register as part of a study of Tourtellotte and Hummel works.

It currently is the home of a nondenominational church, the Pinehurst Community Bible Church.
