= H. H. Bryant Garage =

- Bryant, H. H., Garage
- U.S. National Register of Historic Places
- The H.H. Bryant Garage in 1980

- Location within Idaho Location within the United States
- Location: 11th and Front Sts., Boise, Idaho
- Coordinates: 43°36′58″N 116°12′25″W
- Area: less than one acre
- Built: 1917
- Built by: J.O. Jordan
- Architect: Tourtellotte & Hummel
- Architectural style: Early Commercial
- MPS: Tourtellotte and Hummel Architecture TR
- NRHP reference No.: 82000184
- Added to NRHP: November 17, 1982

The H.H. Bryant Garage in Boise, Idaho, was a 2-story brick building designed by Tourtellotte & Hummel and constructed by contractor J.O. Jordan in 1917. The garage, also known as the Ford Building, originally was a showroom and service center for Ford cars and trucks. The building featured nine window bays on Front Street and seven bays on 11th Street, and the bays were separated by ornamented, stone capped pilasters that terminated at the second floor roof and well below the flat parapet. Parapet crests over the corner bays featured outset coping and notched shoulders. The building was added to the National Register of Historic Places (NRHP) in 1982. The building was demolished in 1990.

== H.H. Bryant ==
Harry H. Bryant (August 5, 1871—May 20, 1938) was born in Detroit and attended the University of Michigan. He operated a steamboat on the Great Lakes before moving to Seattle in 1908. At the request of Henry Ford, husband of Bryant's sister, Bryant moved to Boise in 1913 to manage the Ford automobile dealership under the business name of Bryant & Son. By 1916 Bryant & Son sold up to 40 cars per week, and the company had outgrown its showroom. As a result of increasing sales, the large H.H. Bryant Garage was constructed in 1917.

In 1921 Bryant constructed a Ford assembly plant on Fairview Avenue in Boise. The plant was no longer in operation when the building burned in 1939.

Harry and Nellie Bryant purchased the Charles Rathbun House (1919) on Warm Springs Avenue in 1920. The house is a contributing resource in Boise's Warm Springs Avenue Historic District.
