= H. R. Neitzel House =

- U.S. National Register of Historic Places
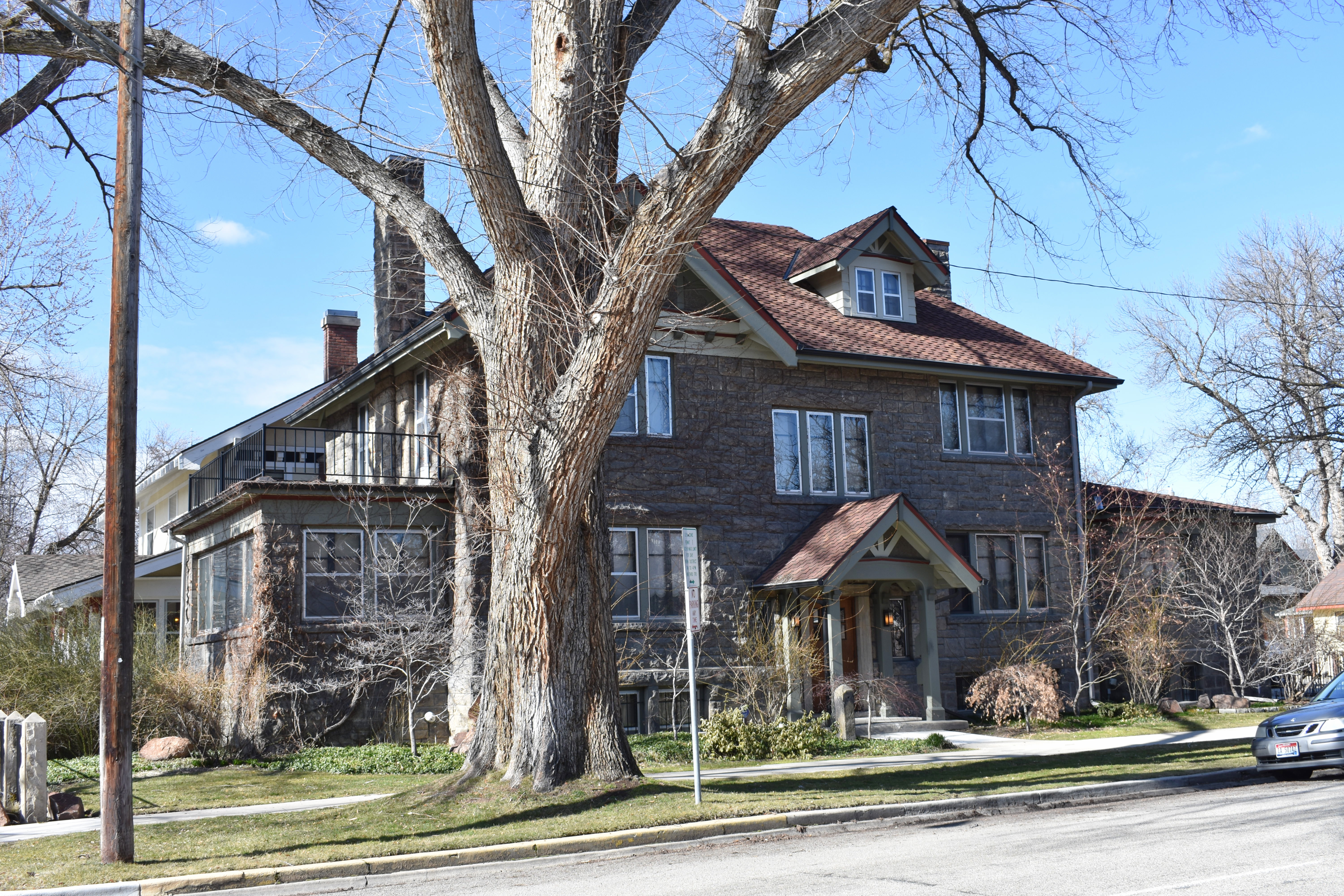
- The H.R. Neitzel House in 2019

- Location within Idaho Location within the United States
- Location: 705 N. 9th St., Boise, Idaho
- Coordinates: 43°37′16″N 116°11′57″W
- Area: less than one acre
- Built: 1918
- Built by: Michel, Frank
- Architect: Tourtellotte and Hummel
- Architectural style: Tudoresque
- MPS: Tourtellotte and Hummel Architecture TR
- NRHP reference No.: 82000229
- Added to NRHP: November 17, 1982

The H.R. Neitzel House in Boise, Idaho, is a 2 1/2-story Tudor Revival house designed by Tourtellotte & Hummel and constructed of sandstone by contractor Frank Michel in 1918. The house features a hip roof with half-timber gables.

Herman R. Neitzel was an investor in Boise, and he owned the Bannock Motor Sales Company, an automobile dealership and successor to the Central Auto Company, purveyors of Maxwell cars and Garford trucks. He lived at the H.R. Neitzel House from its construction until his death in 1963.
