= St. Mary's Catholic Church (Caldwell, Idaho) =

- U.S. National Register of Historic Places
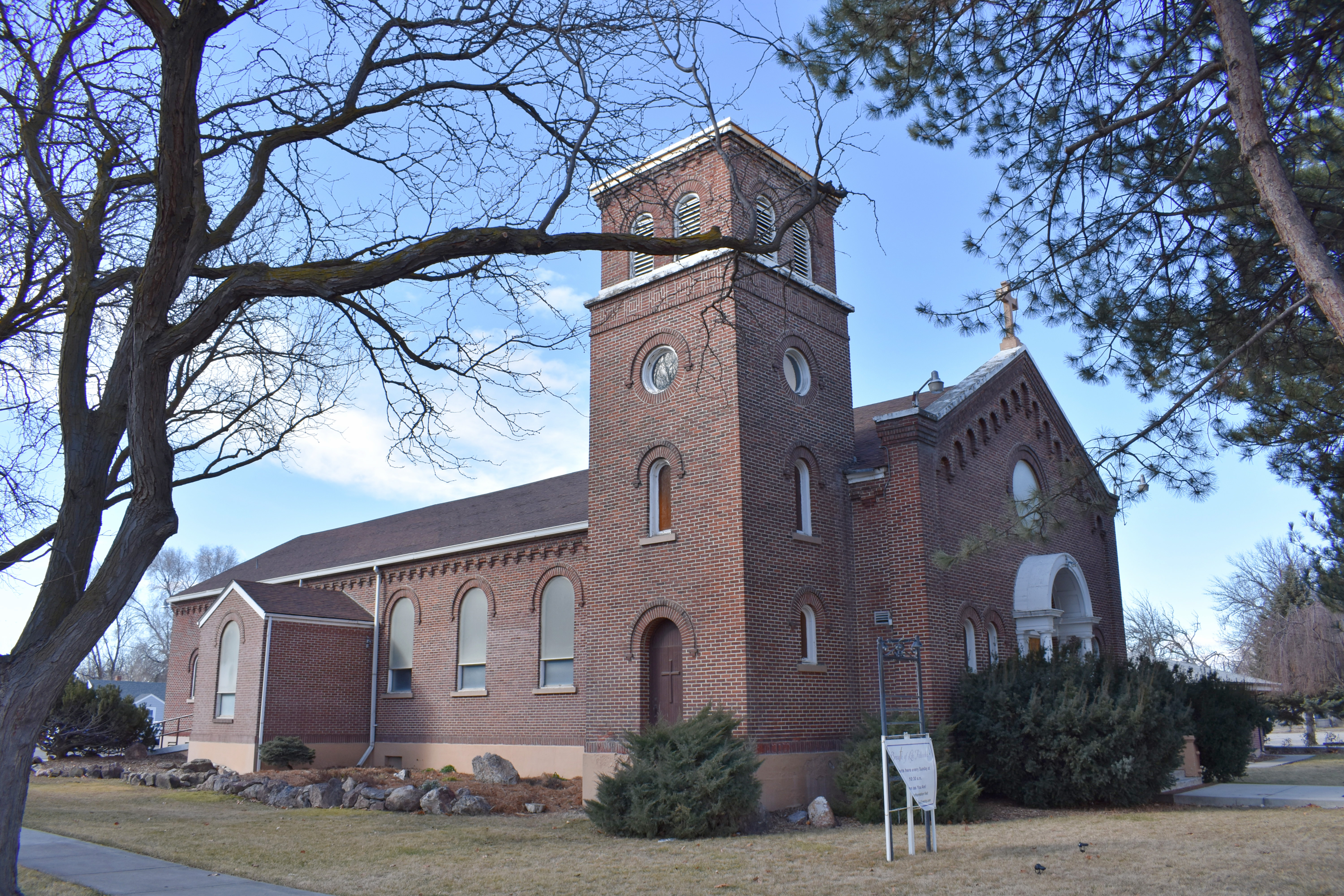
- The former St. Mary's Catholic Church in 2019

- Location within Idaho Location within the United States
- Location: 616 Dearborn, Caldwell, Idaho
- Coordinates: 43°39′52″N 116°41′29″W
- Area: less than one acre
- Built: 1925
- Built by: McNeel, H. J.
- Architect: Tourtellotte & Hummel
- Architectural style: Italianate Romanesque Revival
- MPS: Tourtellotte and Hummel Architecture TR
- NRHP reference No.: 82000332
- Added to NRHP: November 17, 1982

St. Mary's Catholic Church is a red brick, Italianate Romanesque Revival building designed by Tourtellotte and Hummel and constructed by H.J. McNeel in 1925 in Caldwell, Idaho. The church features an 80-ft tower, and the building was added to the National Register of Historic Places in 1982.

Originally intended as the Church of the Immaculate Conception, the building was known as St. Mary's Catholic Church by 1930 or earlier.

The church was designed to seat a congregation of 300 persons, and it remained in service as a Catholic building until 2003, when larger Our Lady of the Valley Catholic Church opened in Caldwell.
