= Louis Stephan House =

Historic building in Idaho, USA

- U.S. National Register of Historic Places
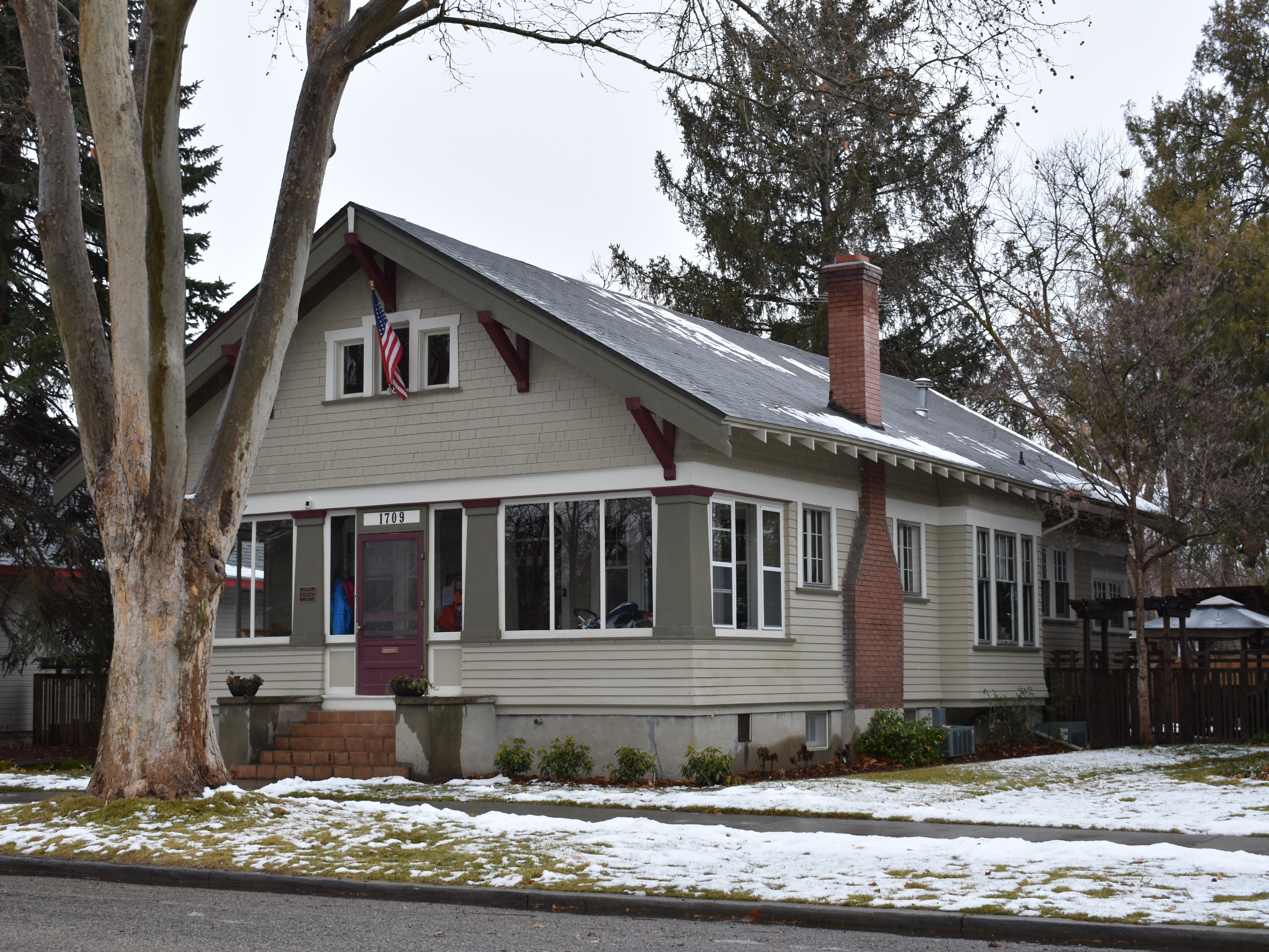
- The Louis Stephan House in 2019

- Location within Idaho Location within the United States
- Location: 1709 N. 18th St., Boise, Idaho
- Coordinates: 43°38′06″N 116°12′37″W
- Area: less than one acre
- Built: 1915
- Architect: Tourtellotte & Hummel
- Architectural style: Bungalow/craftsman
- MPS: Tourtellotte and Hummel Architecture TR
- NRHP reference No.: 82000248
- Added to NRHP: November 17, 1982

The Louis Stephan House is a 1-story Bungalow in Boise, Idaho, designed by Tourtellotte & Hummel and constructed in 1915. The house features a modest, rectangular design with a ridgebeam running perpendicular to the street, front and back gables, and an enclosed porch behind "four blocky battered posts with plain battered capitals." The house was added to the National Register of Historic Places in 1982.

Louis Stephan and his sons owned Boise's Imperial Bakery, and Stephan was president of the Stephan Baking Co. During World War I and at the time of his death in 1933, he was known as Ludwig Stephan. (Note: The nomination form prepared when the house was added to the National Register of Historic Places indicates that Louis Stephan and his brother, August, owned the bakery. Stephan's obituary mentions Jacob Stephan as the brother living in the United States, with whom Louis had earlier engaged in logging. Stephan had two sons, Rudolph (Adolph) and August. Rudolph died in Boise of an appendicitis at the age of 25. Stephan family members owned various properties in Boise at the time of construction of the Louse Stephan House, and the nomination form references an article in the Idaho Statesman, October 2, 1915, that places the intended location of the house at 21st and Sherman Streets, not 1709 N 18th Street as mentioned in the listing. This difference may be either a change of building site or possibly that researchers described the wrong house. Further research is needed on both points mentioned here.)
