= Gorby Opera Theater =

- U.S. National Register of Historic Places
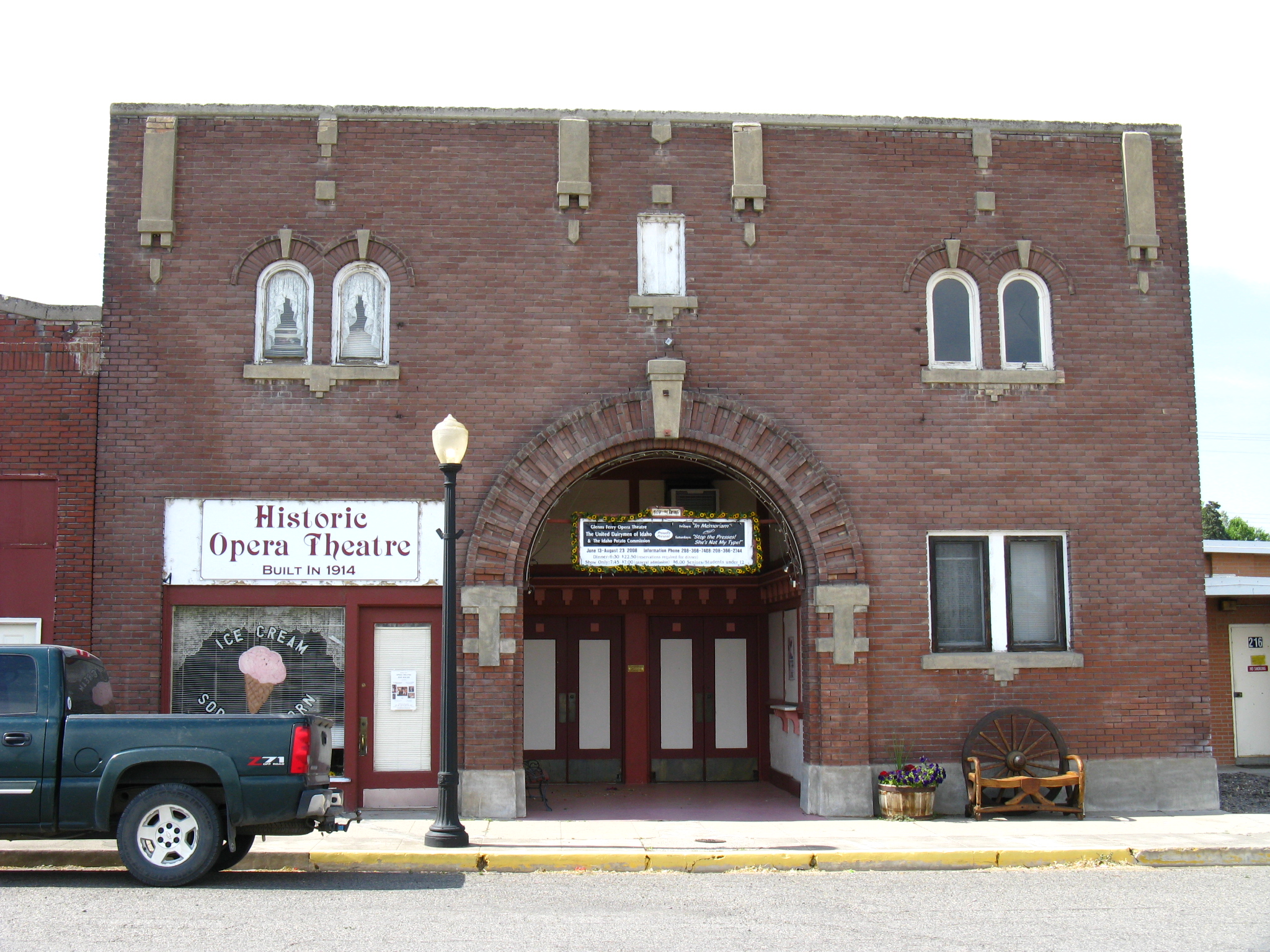

- Location within Idaho Location within the United States
- Location: Idaho St., Glenns Ferry, Idaho
- Coordinates: 42°57′16″N 115°17′51″W
- Area: less than one acre
- Built: 1914
- Architect: Tourtellotte & Hummel
- Architectural style: Proto-deco
- MPS: Tourtellotte and Hummel Architecture TR
- NRHP reference No.: 82000339
- Added to NRHP: November 17, 1982

The Gorby Opera Theater on Idaho Street in Glenns Ferry, Idaho was built in 1914. It was listed on the National Register of Historic Places in 1982.

It is a 42 by 100 feet (13 m × 30 m) brick building with concrete trim. It has a parapeted front facade with a round-arched entryway. It was designed by architects Tourtellotte & Hummel.

The building was funded by R. D. Gorby.
