= Walter Abbs House =

Historic house in Idaho, United States

- U.S. National Register of Historic Places
- U.S. Historic district – Contributing property
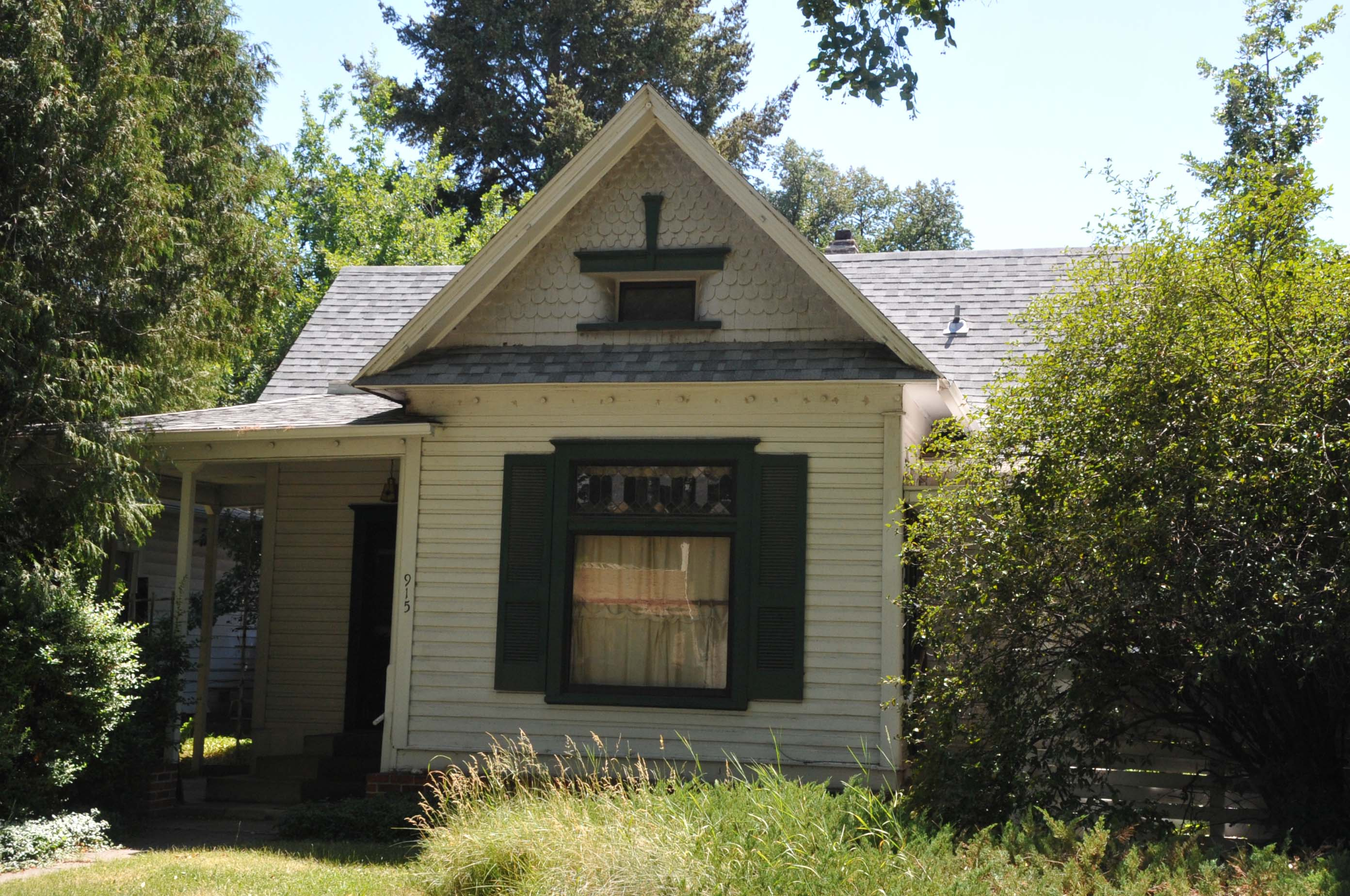
- The Walter Abbs House in 2013

- Location within Idaho Location within the United States
- Location: 915 Fort St., Boise, Idaho
- Coordinates: 43°37′21″N 116°11′54″W
- Area: less than one acre
- Built: 1903
- Architect: John Tourtellotte & Company
- Architectural style: Queen Anne
- Part of: Fort Street Historic District (ID82000199)
- MPS: Tourtellotte and Hummel Architecture TR
- NRHP reference No.: 82000175
- Added to NRHP: November 17, 1982

The Walter Abbs House, is a Queen Anne style house designed by Tourtellotte & Co. and constructed in Boise, Idaho, USA, in 1903. The five room house is part of the Fort Street Historic District, and it was included as a contributing property on November 12, 1982. It was individually listed on the National Register of Historic Places on November 17, 1982.

Walter J. Abbs arrived in Boise in 1901 and formed the firm of McGrew & Abbs, abstract researchers, mortgage lenders, and insurance agents. When his business was absorbed by the Boise Title and Trust Co. in 1906, Abbs became general manager and secretary of the new firm. Abbs was an investor in Boise's Abbs Subdivision, and lots on Abbs Street and on Abbs Lane were sold as early as 1917.

== See also ==
- National Register of Historic Places listings in Ada County, Idaho
