= Boise Junior High School =

- North Junior High School
- U.S. National Register of Historic Places
- U.S. Historic district – Contributing property
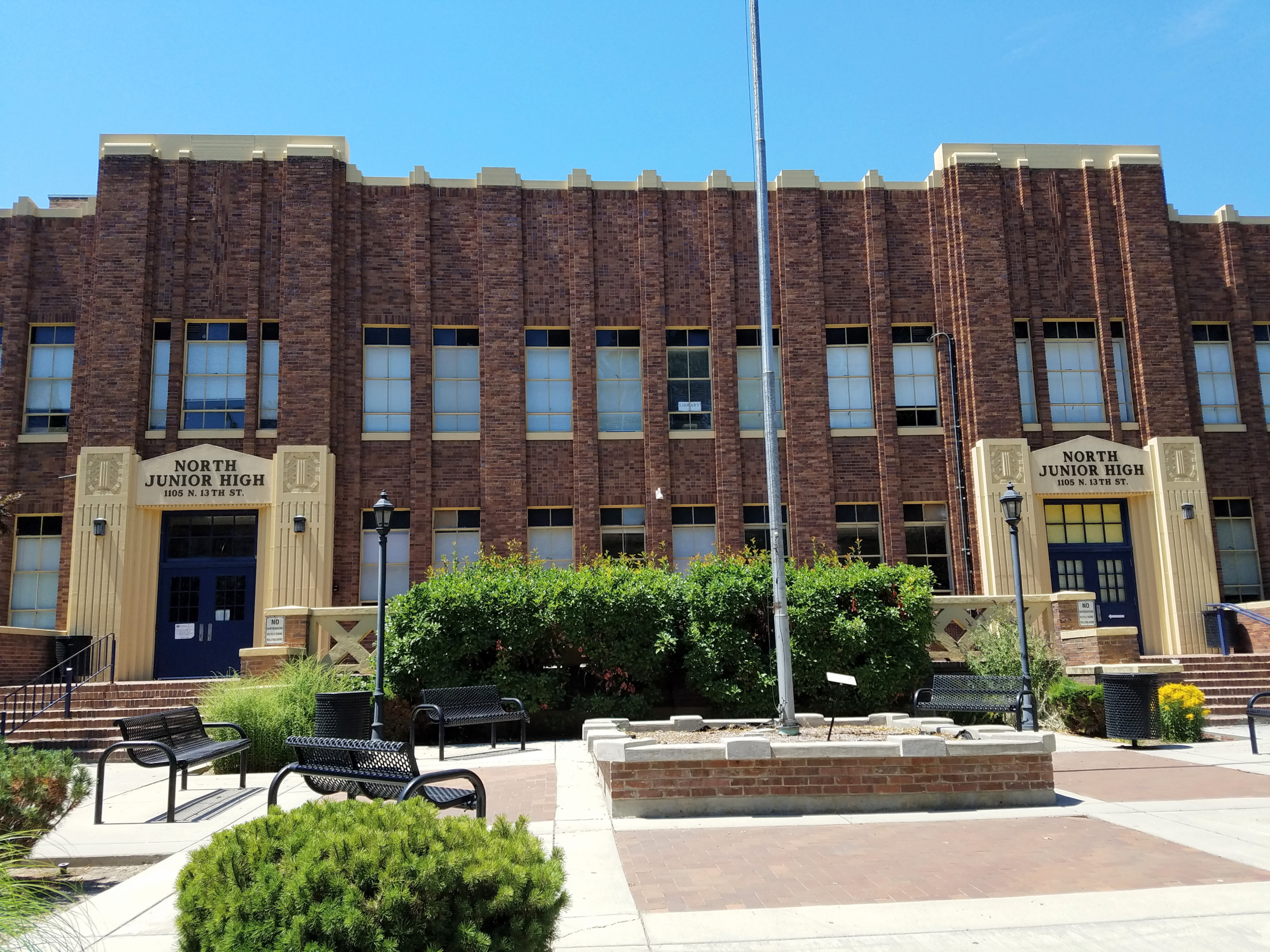
- The school in 2018

- Location within Idaho Location within the United States
- Location: 1105 N 13th St; Boise, Idaho
- Coordinates: 43°37′33″N 116°12′11″W
- Built: 1937
- Built by: J.O. Jordan & Son
- Architect: Tourtellotte & Hummel
- Architectural style: Art Deco
- Website: north.boiseschools.org
- Part of: Fort Street Historic District (ID82000199)
- NRHP reference No.: 82000186
- Added to NRHP: November 17, 1982

North Junior High School, previously known as Boise Junior High School, is an Art Deco, brick school designed by Tourtellotte & Hummel and constructed in Boise, Idaho, United States, in 1937. The school was included as a contributing property in the Fort Street Historic District on November 12, 1982. It was individually listed on the National Register of Historic Places on November 17, 1982.

== History ==
In the late 1920s and early 1930s, several independent schools and small school districts were consolidated under the larger Boise School District, and soon arose a need for additional classroom space. Moreover, the district reorganized its schools from an eight-grade primary and four-grade secondary system to an elementary, junior high, and senior high school system. The district received a grant from the Works Progress Administration allowing construction of Boise's first junior high.

The school was constructed by contractor J.O. Jordan & Son from locally sourced brick and sandstone, and the building was dedicated in 1937. When South Junior High School was constructed in 1948, Boise Junior High School was renamed North Junior High School. A band room was added to the building in 1949, and a cafeteria was added in 1968.

== History of Lemp Triangle ==
The school was constructed on a 4.55-acre (1.84 ha), 2-block parcel of land known as Lemp Triangle, named for brewer and former Boise City mayor John Lemp.

On November 23, 1867, mayor Henry E. Prickett filed the original 410-acre plat of Boise City in the office of the Ada County Recorder, and on January 13, 1868, Prickett petitioned the United States Department of the Interior for a townsite patent. But on May 2, 1870, Boise City received an award of 442 acres from the Department of the Interior, an increase of 32 acres of public property over the original townsite plat. Part of the 32-acre parcel remained unimproved, and on June 5, 1891, mayor James A. Pinney deeded 4.55 acres of the parcel to John Lemp in exchange for $1.00 consideration. Lemp occupied the property, and by 1905 he was renting it to a "China vegetable garden," but by then his claim of ownership was in dispute, and a new deed to the property was presented to Lemp by mayor John M. Haines in 1908.

Voters rejected a bond measure in 1910 that would have provided $40,000 for the purchase of Lemp Triangle and would have designated the property as a city park. Then in 1913, after a decision by the Idaho Supreme Court declaring the Lemp deeds unlawful, Boise City regained control of the property and designated it as a park.

The Boise School Board voted to purchase the property for $22,500 in June, 1925, for construction of a junior high school, and the site also was considered briefly for additional construction of an elementary school to replace the aging Whittier School.

Boise Junior High School construction would be delayed for over ten years, however, and excavation at Lemp Triangle finally began early in March, 1936. The cornerstone was set in place by buildings and grounds superintendent C. B. Little on May 21, 1936, and the building was dedicated May 24, 1937.

The residential area north and east of Lemp Triangle was developed in 1911, including 65 homesites in what was dubbed the Lemp Triangle Addition.

Lemp street runs east and west, seven blocks north of Lemp Triangle. The street is part of Boise's North End.
