= Axel Nixon House =

- U.S. National Register of Historic Places
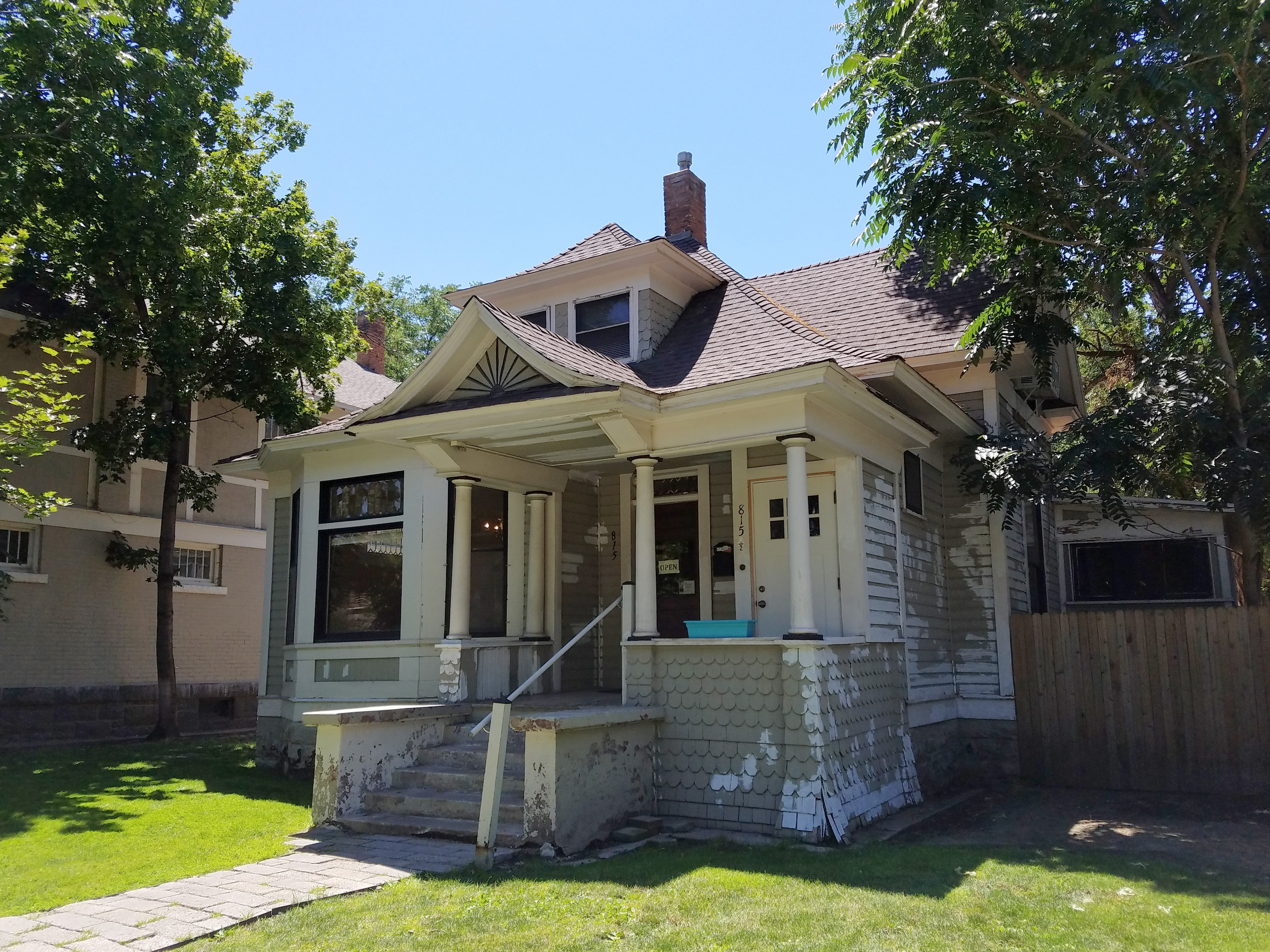
- The Axel Nixon House in 2018

- Location within Idaho Location within the United States
- Location: 815 N. Hays St., Boise, Idaho
- Coordinates: 43°37′16″N 116°11′53″W
- Area: less than one acre
- Built: 1903
- Architect: Tourtellotte, John & Company
- Architectural style: Queen Anne
- MPS: Tourtellotte and Hummel Architecture TR
- NRHP reference No.: 82000230
- Added to NRHP: November 17, 1982

The Axel Nixon House is a Queen Anne style cottage in the Fort Street Historic District in Boise, Idaho, USA. The house was designed by Tourtellotte & Co. and constructed in 1903. Features include a roof with flared eaves, flared dormers, and a small porch with Tuscan columns supported by low, flared walls below a decorative sunburst patterned gable. The house has been altered since construction and now serves the community as home to St. John's Food Bank.

Axel Nixon was chief drafter in the United States General Land Office at Boise.

== See also ==
- National Register of Historic Places listings in Ada County, Idaho
