= John Haines House =

Historic house in Idaho, United States

- U.S. National Register of Historic Places
- U.S. Historic district – Contributing property
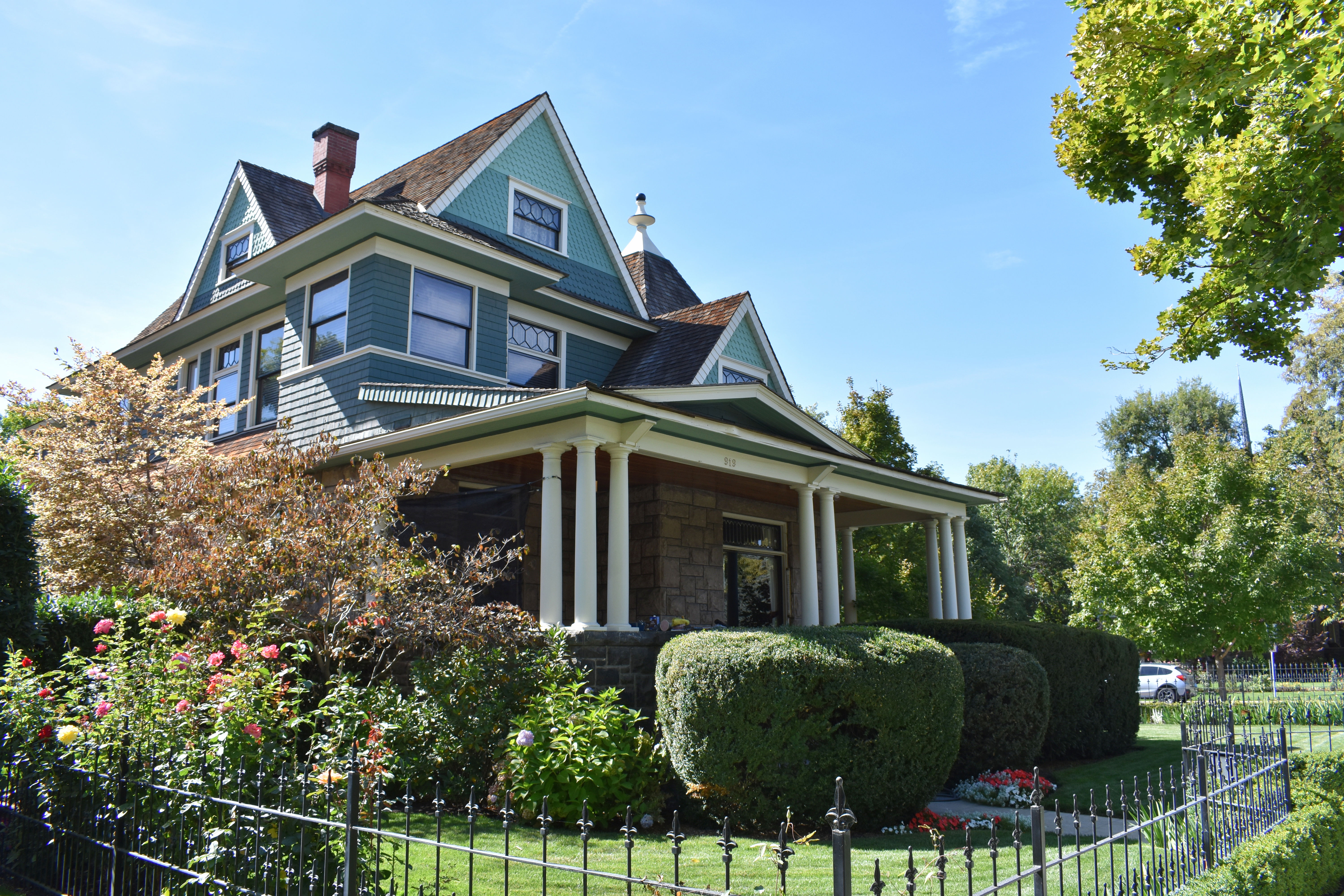
- The John Haines House in 2018

- Location within Idaho Location within the United States
- Interactive map showing the location for John Haines House
- Location: 919 W. Hays St. Boise, Idaho
- Coordinates: 43°37′19″N 116°11′58″W
- Area: less than one acre
- Built: 1904
- Architect: John E. Tourtellotte & Company
- Architectural style: Queen Anne
- Part of: Fort Street Historic District (ID82000199)
- MPS: Tourtellotte and Hummel Architecture TR
- NRHP reference No.: 82000207
- Added to NRHP: November 17, 1982

The John Haines House is a 2 1/2-story Queen Anne style house in the Fort Street Historic District of Boise, Idaho. Designed by Tourtellotte & Co. and constructed in 1904, the house features a veneer of rectangular cut stone applied to the first story and shingled, flared walls at the second story. Turrets accent the front two corners of the house, and a classical porch with doric columns and a flattened pediment separates the offset main entrance from the street. It was included as a contributing property in the Fort Street Historic District on November 12, 1982. The house was individually listed on the National Register of Historic Places on November 17, 1982.

John M. Haines was a real estate developer and Republican who served as mayor of Boise City 1907-1909 and as Governor of Idaho 1913–1915.

== See also ==
- Tourtellotte & Hummel
