= Fort Street Historic District =

- U.S. National Register of Historic Places
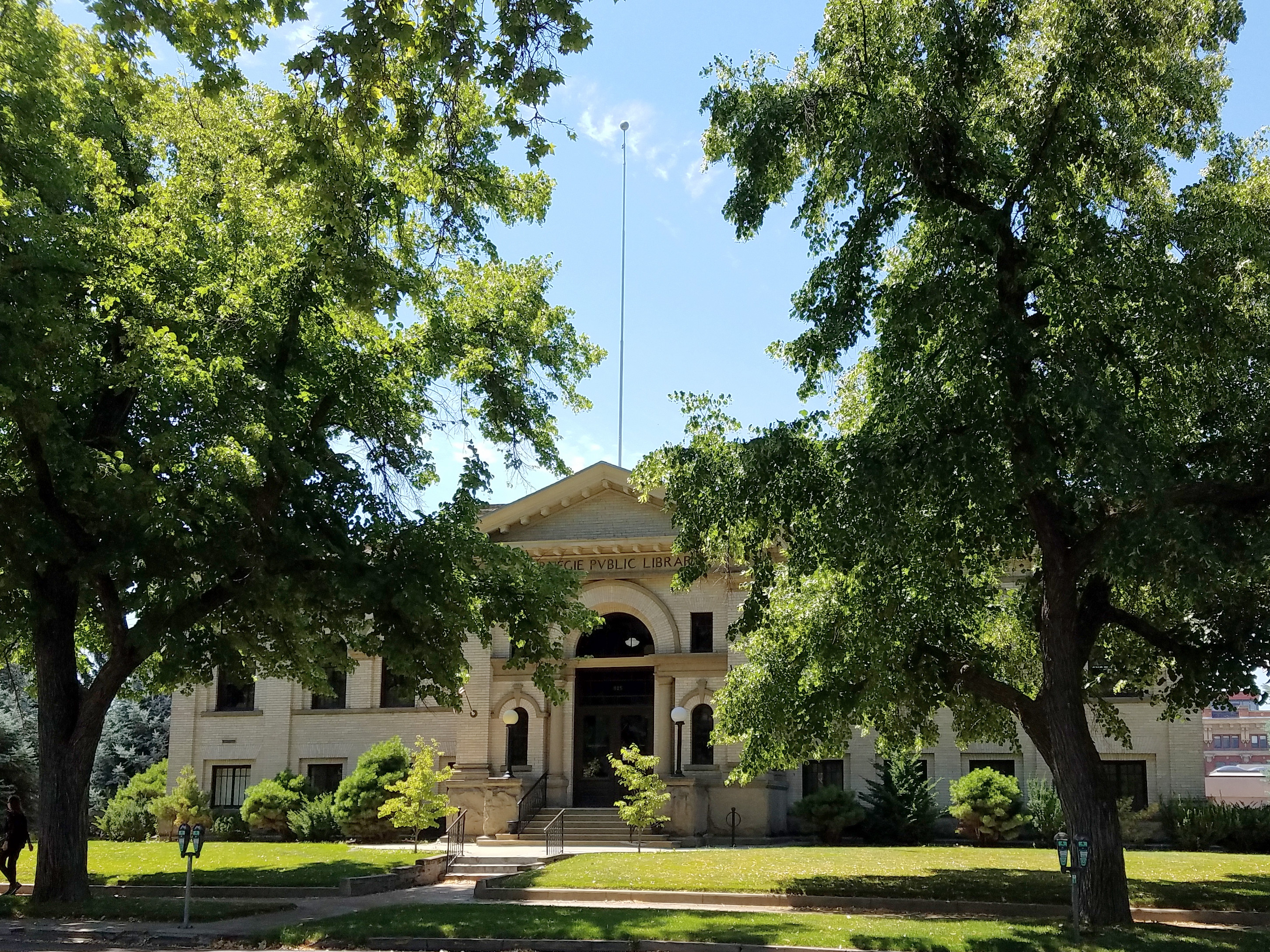
- Carnegie Library

- Location within Idaho Location within the United States
- Location: Fort St., State St., 4th St., 16th St. Boise, Idaho
- Coordinates: 43°37′20″N 116°12′00″W
- Area: 102 acres (41 ha)
- Built: 1890-1940
- Architectural style: Queen Anne; Colonial Revival; Art Deco; American Foursquare; Bungalow
- NRHP reference No.: 82000199
- Added to NRHP: November 12, 1982

The Fort Street Historic District in Boise, Idaho, contains roughly 47 blocks located within the 1867 plat of Boise City. The irregular shape of the district is roughly bounded on the north by West Fort Street and on the south by West State Street. The west boundary is North 16th Street, and the east boundary is roughly North 5th Street.

When the nomination form was prepared in 1982 for the National Register of Historic Places (NRHP), the district contained 318 buildings. The inventory consisted mostly of houses, but schools, churches, and commercial structures were included. Many structures were designed by Tourtellotte & Hummel, and some were designed by Wayland & Fennell. The district contains many sites with individual NRHP listing, and the Boise High School Campus and the St. John's Cathedral Block both are separately listed and contain multiple structures within the larger Fort Street Historic District. The district is itself contained within a larger area known locally as Boise's North End Preservation District, although the North End includes other NRHP listed historic districts.

== Partial list of contributing properties ==
- Walter Abbs House, 915 W. Fort St.
- Boise High School Campus, 1010 W. Washington St.
- Boise Junior High School, 1105 N. 13th St.
- James H. Bush House, 1020 W. Franklin St.
- Carnegie Public Library, 815 W. Washington St.
- Christian Church, 615 N. 9th St.
- Henry Coffin House, 1403 W. Franklin St.
- John Daly House, 1015 W. Hays St.
- Dr. James Davies House, 1107 W. Washington St.
- R. K. Davis House, 1016 W. Franklin St.
- William Dunbar House, 1500 W. Hays St.
- Minnie Priest Dunton House, 906 W. Hays St.
- Eichelberger Apartments, 612 N. 9th St.
- Alva Fleharty House, 907 W. Hays St.
- J. H. Gakey House, 1402 W. Franklin St.
- John Haines House, 919 W. Hays St.
- Samuel Hays House, 612 W. Franklin St.
- Fred Hottes House, 509 W. Hays St.
- Immanuel Evangelical Lutheran Church, 707 W. Fort St.
- J. M. Johnson House, 1002 W. Franklin St.
- T. J. Jones Apartments, 808 N. 10th St.
- M. J. Marks House, 1001 W. Hays St.
- Judge Charles P. McCarthy House, 1415 W. Fort St.
- H. E. McElroy House, 924 W. Fort St.
- H. R. Neitzel House, 705 N. 9th St.
- Axel Nixon House, 815 N. Hays St.
- John A. O'Farrell House, 420 W. Franklin St.
- John Parker House, 713 W. Franklin St.
- St. John's Cathedral Block, 807 N. 8th St.
- H. A. Schmelzel House, 615 W. Hays St.
- Adolph Schreiber House, 524 W. Franklin St.
- William Sidenfaden House, 906 W. Franklin St.
- J. N. Wallace House, 1202 W. Franklin St.
- Wellman Apartments, 500 W. Franklin St.
- Wolters Double Houses, 712, 720 N. 8th St.
- St. Joseph School, 825 W. Fort St.
- YWCA, 720 W. Washington St.
