= H. E. McElroy House =

- U.S. National Register of Historic Places
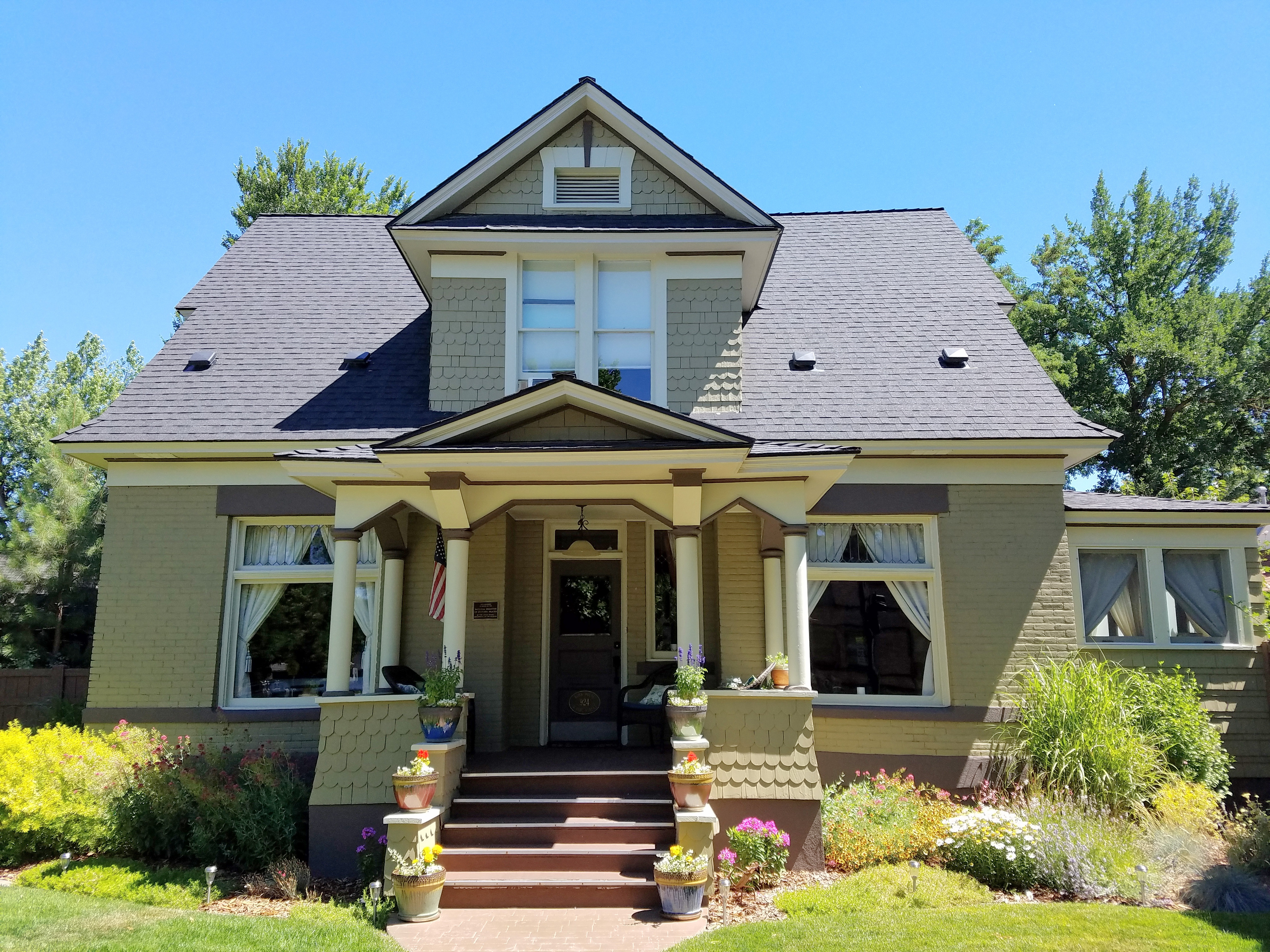
- The H. E. McElroy House in 2018

- Location within Idaho Location within the United States
- Location: 924 W. Fort St., Boise, Idaho
- Coordinates: 43°37′23″N 116°11′55″W
- Area: less than one acre
- Built: 1901
- Architect: John E. Tourtellotte & Company
- Architectural style: Colonial Revival
- MPS: Tourtellotte and Hummel Architecture TR
- NRHP reference No.: 82000222
- Added to NRHP: November 17, 1982

The H.E. McElroy House in Boise, Idaho, USA, was designed by John E. Tourtellotte and constructed in 1901 in a neighborhood now designated the Fort Street Historic District. The brick veneer, 1 1/2-story Colonial design features a rectangular, symmetrical facade with a ridgebeam parallel to the street and an entry porch supported by Doric columns above flared, shingled walls. Dormers and gables are covered with square-cut and fish-scale shingles.

Hugh E. McElroy was a Boise attorney who helped to organize Idaho's Progressive Party. McElroy ran for governor as a Progressive candidate in 1914, but he lost the election to Democrat Moses Alexander.

== See also ==
- Tourtellotte & Hummel
- National Register of Historic Places listings in Ada County, Idaho
