= Judge Charles P. McCarthy House =

Historic house in Idaho, United States

- U.S. National Register of Historic Places
- U.S. Historic district – Contributing property
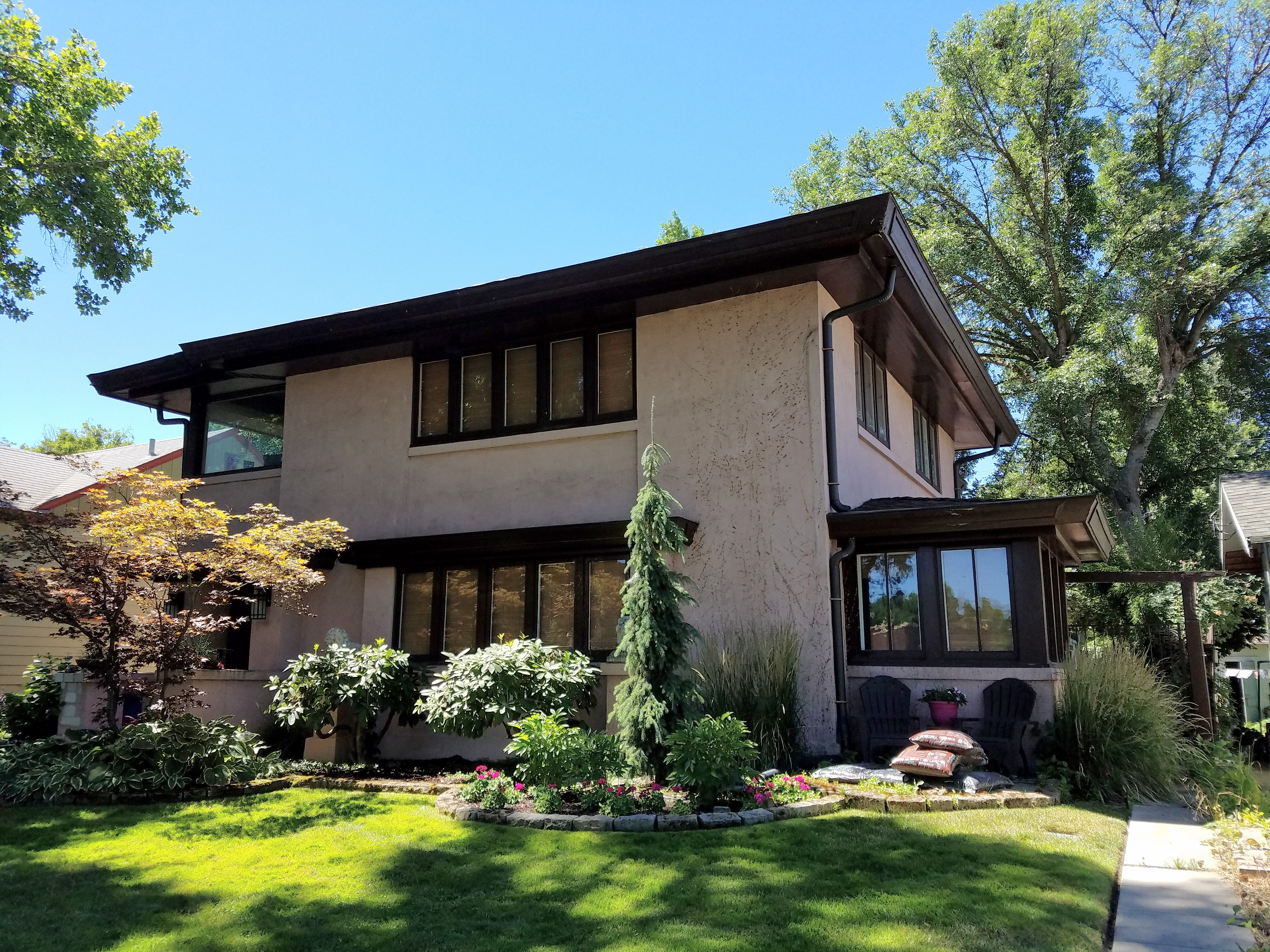

- Location within Idaho Location within the United States
- Location: 1415 Fort St. Boise, Idaho
- Coordinates: 43°37′31.6″N 116°12′19.91″W
- Area: less than one acre
- Built: 1913
- Architect: Frank Lloyd Wright Studio
- Architectural style: Prairie School
- Part of: Fort Street Historic District
- NRHP reference No.: 79000765
- Added to NRHP: August 30, 1979

The Judge Charles P. McCarthy House is a two-story Prairie School duplex which was constructed in Boise, Idaho in 1913. It was adapted from a Frank Lloyd Wright design published in the April 1907 edition of Ladies Home Journal Magazine, where readers could purchase plans for a flat rate, or have them customized by Wright's office for a 10% premium. It appears as a classic prairie-style design with horizontal design elements, including a low-pitch roof with deep hipped roof overhangs.

The house was individually listed on the National Register of Historic Places in 1979. It was included as a contributing property in the Hays Street Historic District in 1982.

== See also ==
- National Register of Historic Places listings in Ada County, Idaho
- List of Frank Lloyd Wright works
