= Christian Church (Boise, Idaho) =

Historic church in Idaho, United States

- Hill City Church
- U.S. National Register of Historic Places
- U.S. Historic district – Contributing property
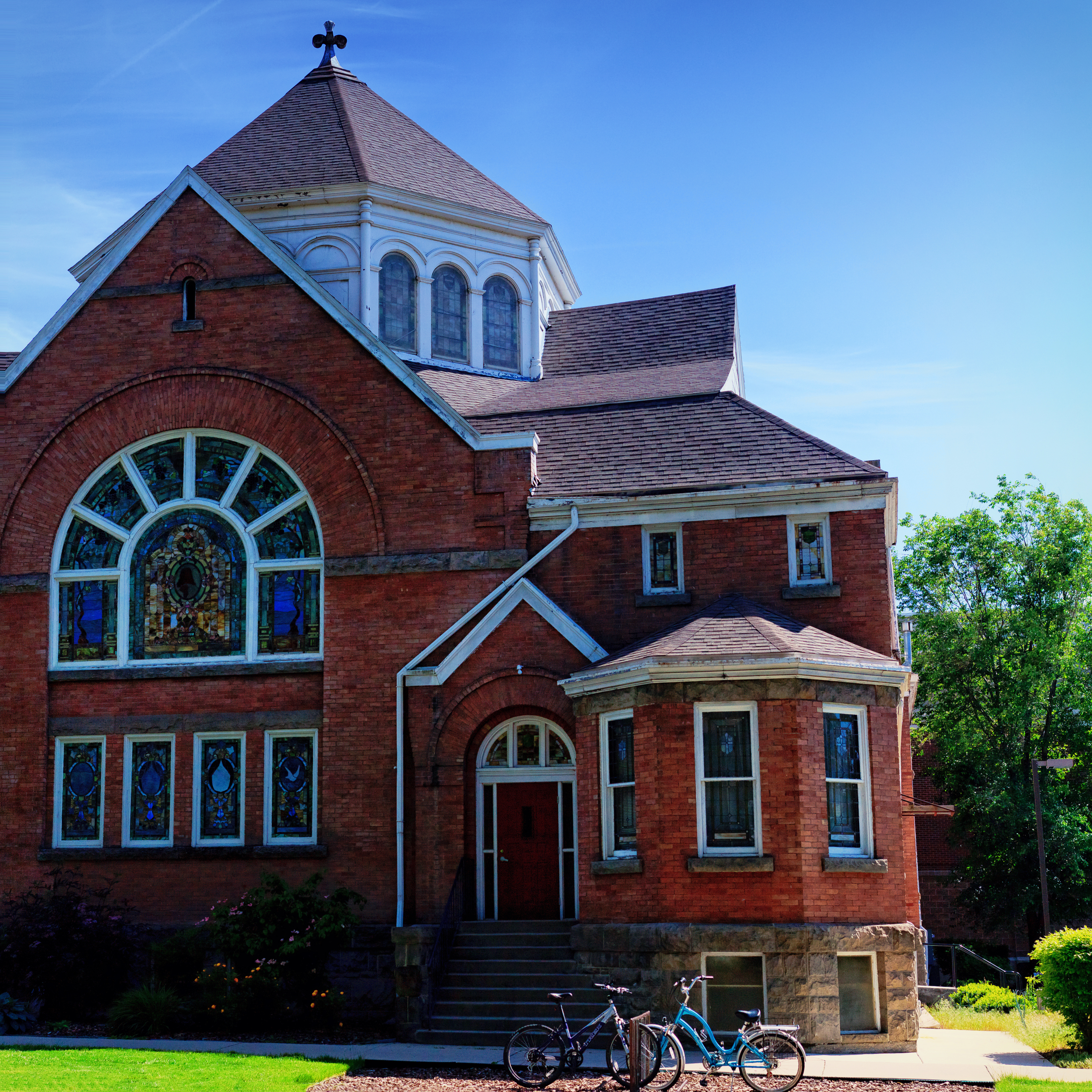

- Location within Idaho Location within the United States
- Location: 9th and Franklin Sts., Boise, Idaho
- Coordinates: 43°37′15″N 116°11′59″W
- Area: less than one acre
- Built: 1910-11
- Built by: I.J. Allen, Charles Storey
- Architectural style: Romanesque
- Part of: Fort Street Historic District (ID82000199)
- NRHP reference No.: 78001031
- Added to NRHP: February 17, 1978

The Hill City Christian Church (previously Capital City Christian Church) in Boise, Idaho is a historic church at 9th and Franklin Streets. The Romanesque-style church was built in 1910-1911 and individually listed on the National Register of Historic Places in 1978. In 1982 it was included as a contributing property in the Fort Street Historic District.

It was deemed "architecturally significant as a good example of the brick Romanesque style applied to an ecclesiastical building. Following the Joplin plan, a standard Christian church design of the period, it is similar to other Christian churches throughout the nation, including the one in Eugene, Oregon. Its hexagonal dome, offset by the two large gables, is rare in Idaho and makes the building a landmark. The stained glass windows are of high quality and exhibit good craftsmanship, as does the interior woodwork. The Balcom and Vaughan theater organ, manufactured in Seattle, is one of the two extant vacuum operated theater organs in Boise (the other is in the Ada Theater)."

Stonework was by mason Charles Storey, who also worked on Boise's St. John's cathedral and the State Capitol.
