= Wolters Double Houses =

- U.S. National Register of Historic Places
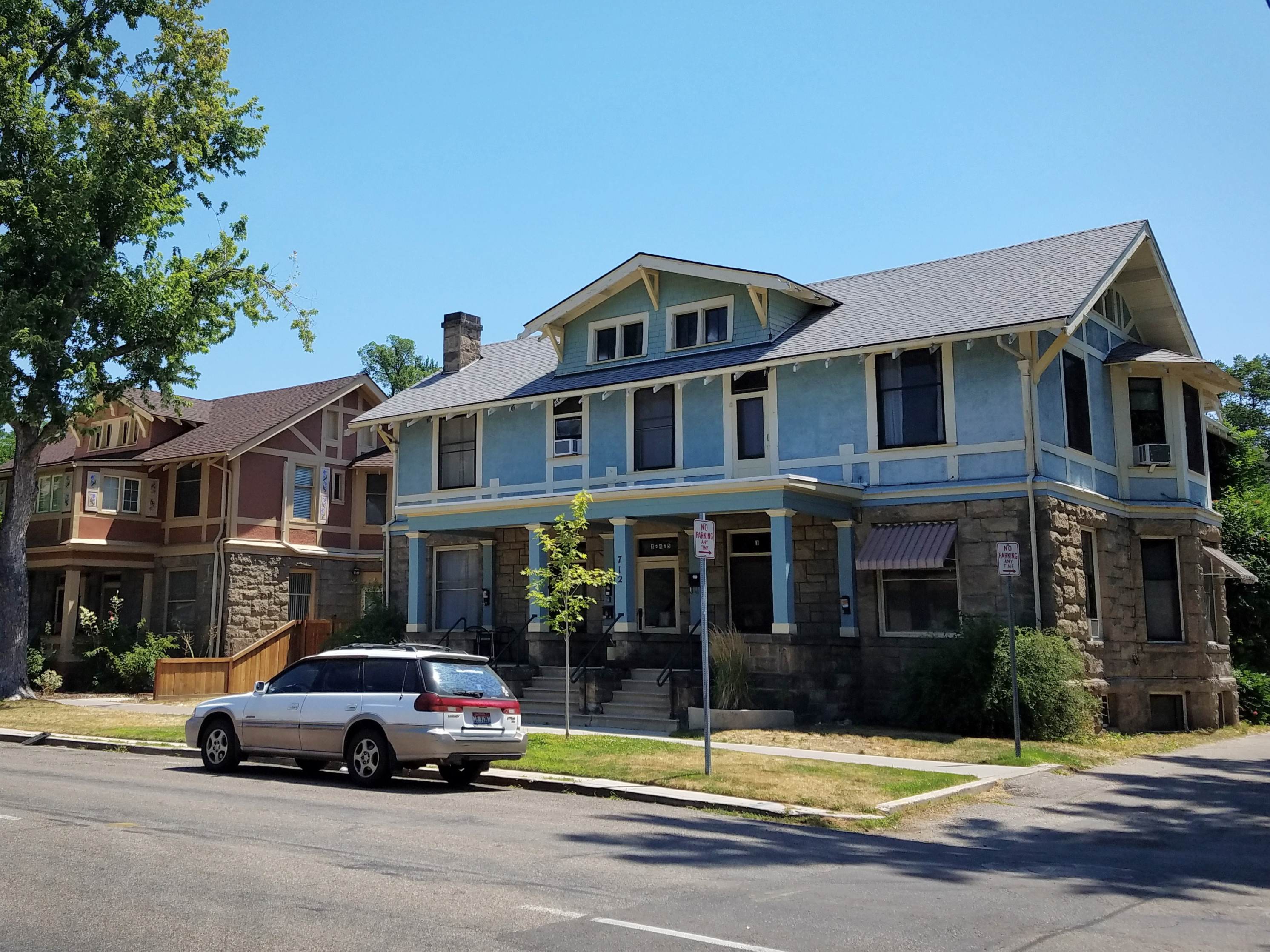
- The "double houses" in 2018

- Location within Idaho Location within the United States
- Location: 712-716 N 8th St. 720-722 N 8th St.Boise, Idaho
- Coordinates: 43°37′14″N 116°11′50″W
- Built: 1908; 1909
- Architect: Tourtellotte & Hummel
- Architectural style: Bungalow duplex
- NRHP reference No.: 82000256
- Added to NRHP: November 12, 1982

The Wolters Double Houses are two similar bungalows designed by Tourtellotte & Hummel and constructed in Boise, Idaho, USA, in 1908 and 1909. Both houses were built from a single duplex design. Part of Boise's Fort Street Historic District, the two houses were listed on the National Register of Historic Places November 12, 1982.

In 1872 President Grant appointed Albert Wolters superintendent of Boise's new assay office, a position he held until 1883. Wolters then operated smelting and mining operations near Idaho City until 1905, and he returned to Boise in that year to manage his rental properties, building the bungalow at 712-716 N 8th Street in 1908. He constructed the second "double house" at 712-716 N 8th Street in 1909 and occupied one side of the building as his family residence.

Original cost of the properties was estimated at $8500 each.
