= Adolph Schreiber House =

Historic house in Boise, Idaho, U.S.

- U.S. National Register of Historic Places
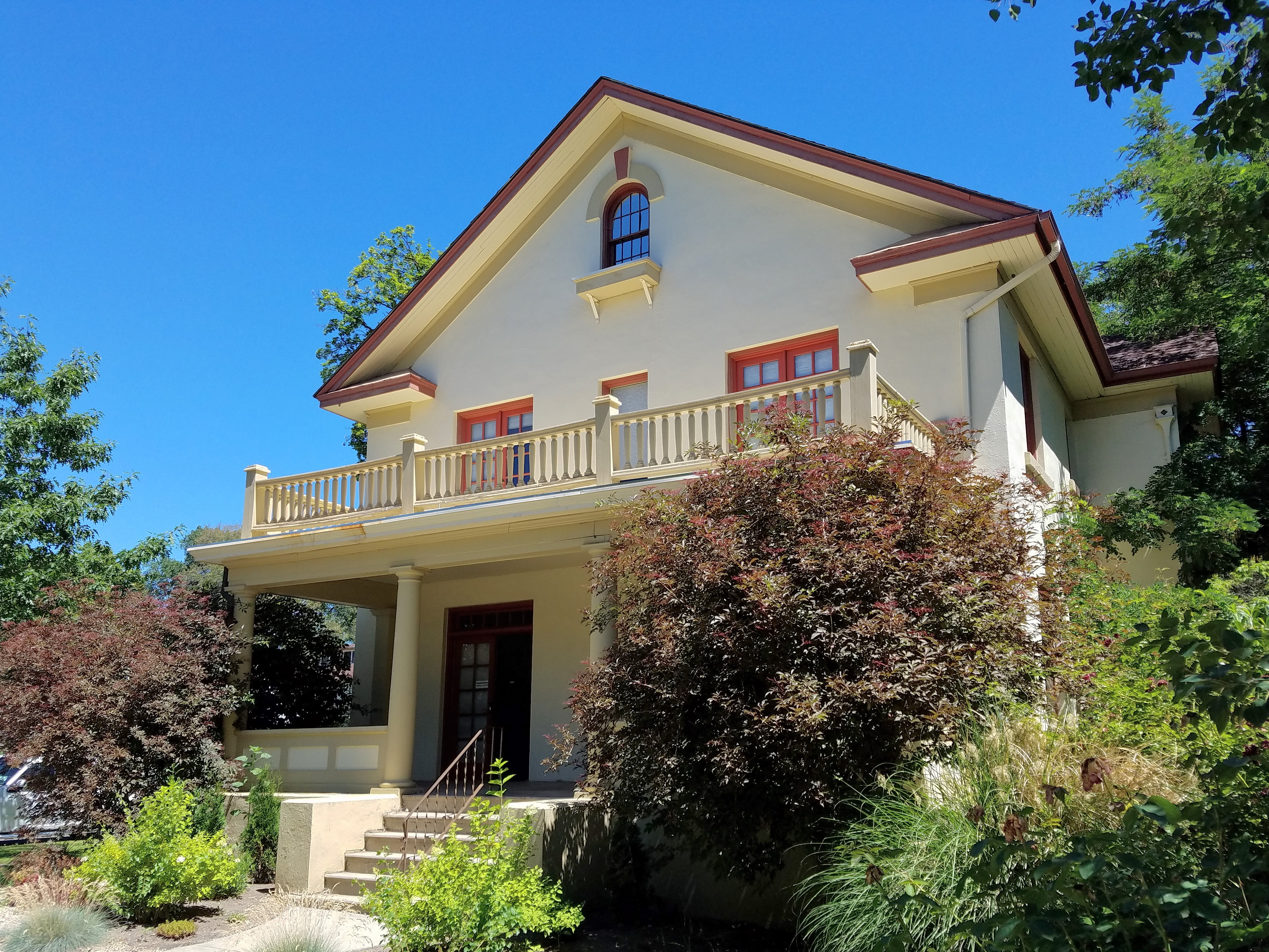
- The Adolph Schreiber House in 2018

- Location within Idaho Location within the United States
- Location: 524 W. Franklin St., Boise, Idaho
- Coordinates: 43°37′09″N 116°11′43″W
- Area: less than one acre
- Built: 1915
- Built by: O.W. Allen
- Architect: Tourtellotte & Hummel
- Architectural style: Classical Revival, Neo-classical Revival
- MPS: Tourtellotte and Hummel Architecture TR
- NRHP reference No.: 82000240
- Added to NRHP: November 17, 1982

The Adolph Schreiber House is a 2-story, Neoclassical Revival house in Boise, Idaho, designed by Tourtellotte & Hummel and constructed by contractor O.W. Allen in 1915. The design included a 10-room dwelling and a second-story apartment accessed from a side entrance. The house was added to the National Register of Historic Places (NRHP) in 1982.

Adolph Schreiber was a funeral director and embalmer in Boise from 1902 until the late 1930s. He was elected Ada County Coroner in 1904 and continued in that office for several years. Schreiber was in partnership with embalmer Edward Brennan, Schreiber & Brennan, from 1904 until 1906, and then he formed a partnership with William Sidenfaden, Schreiber & Sidenfaden, that lasted until 1925. Boise's first ambulance was purchased by Schreiber & Brennen in 1904.

== See also ==
- William Sidenfaden House
- Fort Street Historic District
- National Register of Historic Places listings in Ada County, Idaho
