= Dr. James Davies House =

- U.S. National Register of Historic Places
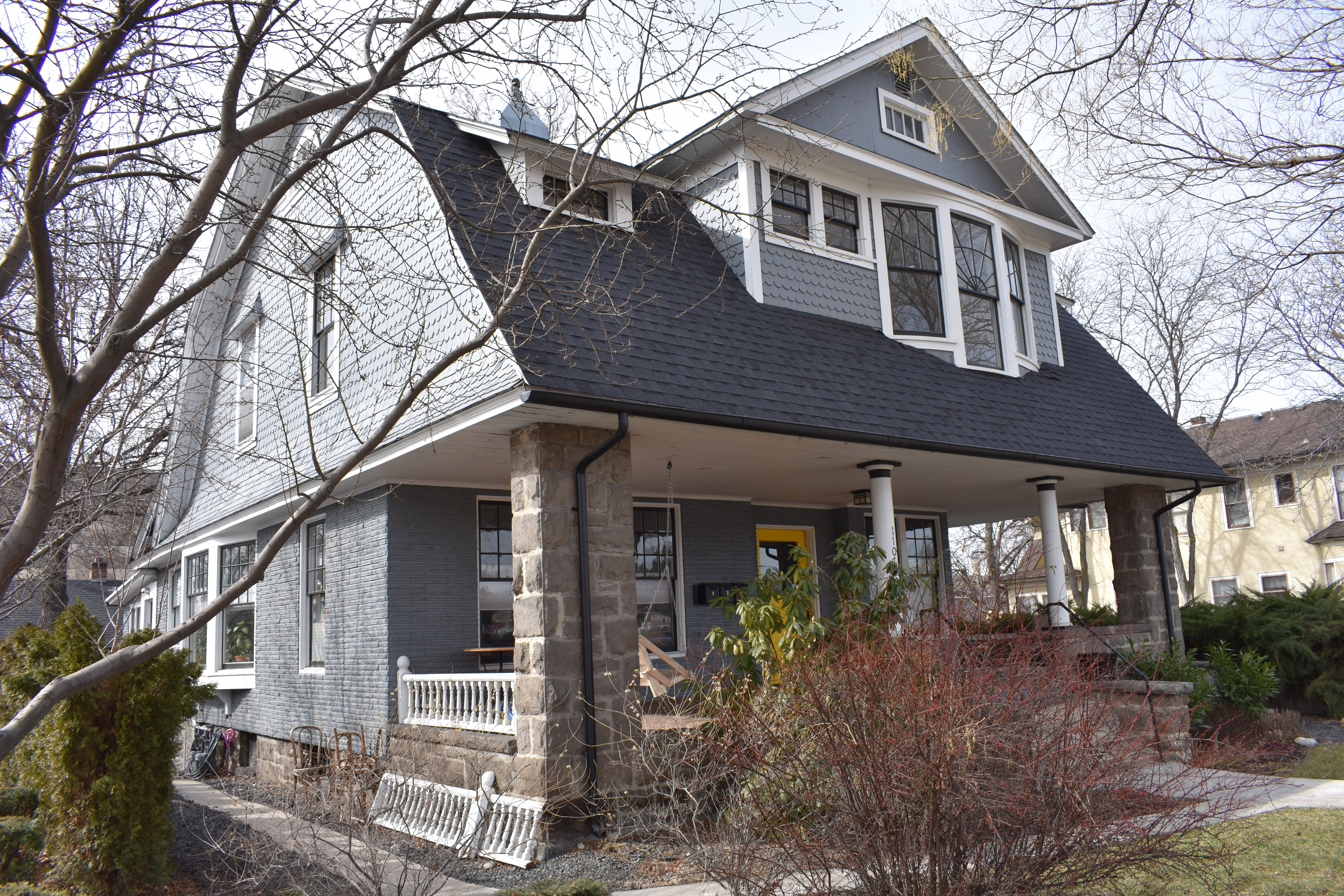
- The Dr. James Davies House in 2019

- Location within Idaho Location within the United States
- Location: 1107 W. Washington St., Boise, Idaho
- Coordinates: 43°37′17″N 116°12′11″W
- Area: less than one acre
- Built: 1904
- Architect: Tourtellotte, John E. & Company
- Architectural style: Colonial Revival
- MPS: Tourtellotte and Hummel Architecture TR
- NRHP reference No.: 82000192
- Added to NRHP: November 17, 1982

The Dr. James Davies House in Boise, Idaho, is a 2-story, shingled Colonial Revival house designed by Tourtellotte & Co. and constructed in 1904. The first floor is veneered in composite brick which may not be original to the house. The shingled upper story has flared walls at its base and small shed roof decorations above side windows. Other prominent features include a gambrel roof that extends over a cross facade porch with stone pillars at its front corners. The right front portion of the roof at its curb is cut inward of the lateral ridgebeam to expose a small, second-floor balcony above a beveled side bay. A large, pedimented front gable includes an off center, mullioned spider web window.

Dr. James C. Davies and his family moved to Boise from Emmettsburg, Iowa, in 1904, first occupying a house the Idaho Statesman referenced as the Randall residence at 12th and Washington Streets. Dr. Davies purchased a lot from E.C. Cook one block east of the Randall residence, and he ordered construction of the 10-room Davies House.

The Davies family occupied the house from its construction in 1904 until 1910, when Dr. Albert E. Weaver purchased the house. Dr. Davies and his family moved into the Borah residence on Franklin Street, previously occupied by William Borah.

Dr. Davies returned to Iowa to care for his parents, and he died in Emmettsburg in 1918.

== See also ==
- Fort Street Historic District
