= Minnie Priest Dunton =

American suffragist and Idaho State Librarian (1864–1921)

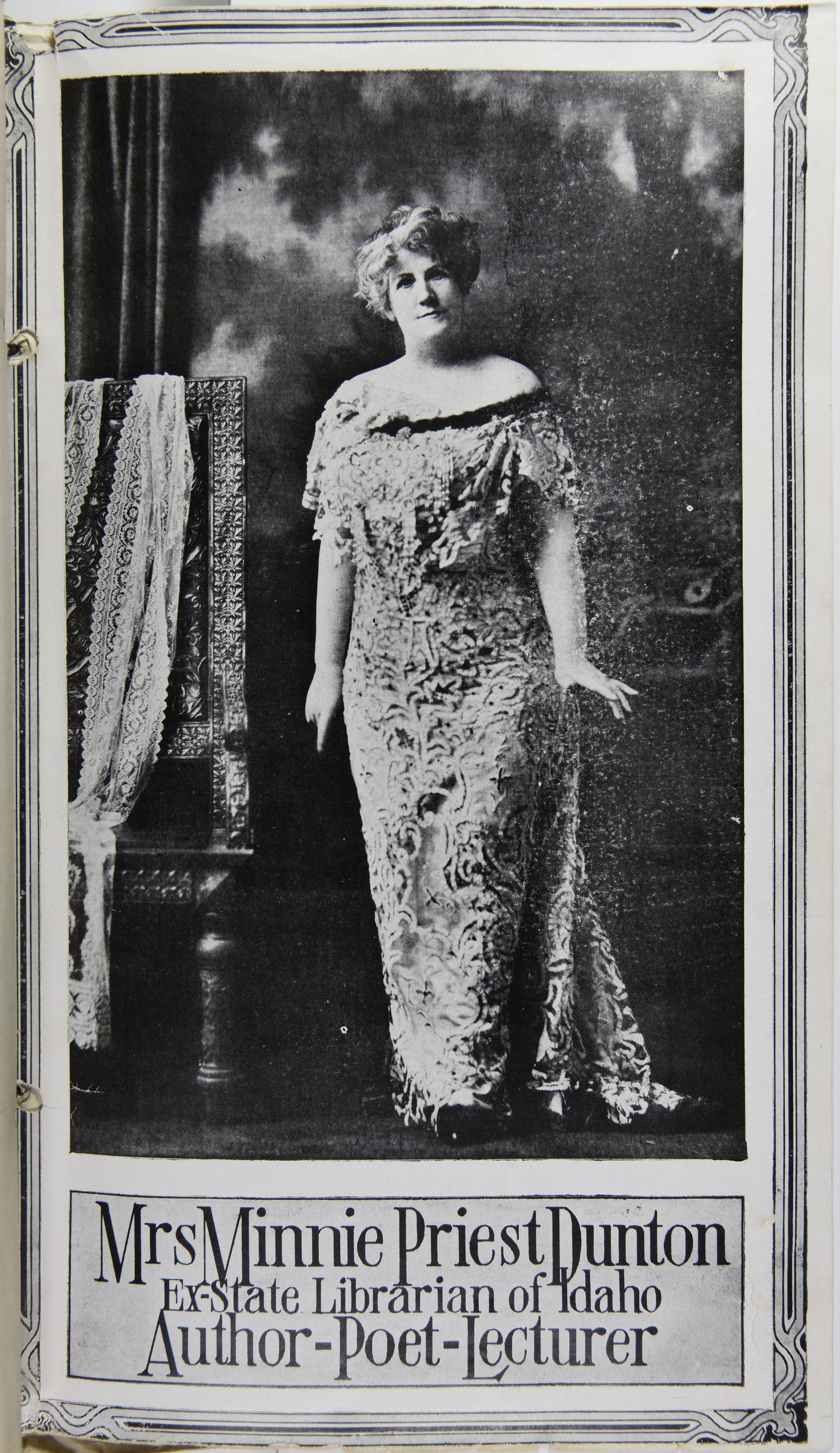
Minnie Priest Dunton

Minnie Priest Dunton (February 29, 1864 – July 13, 1921) was an American suffragist and Idaho State Librarian. She was an early advocate of women's rights in Idaho, and she served as an Idaho State Librarian from 1907 to 1915. She worked with other women to implement the 19th Amendment in Idaho. She became the first woman to be appointed as the State Librarian in Idaho.

== Biography ==
Born in New Hampshire, United States, on February 29, 1864, Minnie Priest Dunton was the daughter of Silas S Priest (1814–1890) and his wife Nancy M Wilder (1822–1887). She moved to Massachusetts and worked as a servant in the family of Charles D. Weston. In 1883, she married Herbert W. Dunton, a district attorney for Boise, Idaho in the 1880s.

During her lifetime, Minnie was an active member of the Rebekah Assemblies in Idaho. In 1894, she was appointed secretary and became its president in 1904. Through her position she started campaign in support of Women's suffrage. In July 1896, she attended the Idaho's second Suffrage Convention in Lewiston, Idaho, as part of the press committee in which she served as a member. This convention mainly focused on suffrage and sobriety. To gain more support, efforts were also made to combine suffrage campaign with the Temperance movement.

In 1907, she was appointed as a State Librarian of Idaho. She resigned this position in 1915 over a salary dispute.

Her house constructed in 1899 in Boise, Idaho, United States, was individually listed on the National Register of Historic Places on November 17, 1982.

She died in Boise, Idaho, on July 13, 1921.
