= M. J. Marks House =

Historic building in Boise, Idaho, USA

- U.S. National Register of Historic Places
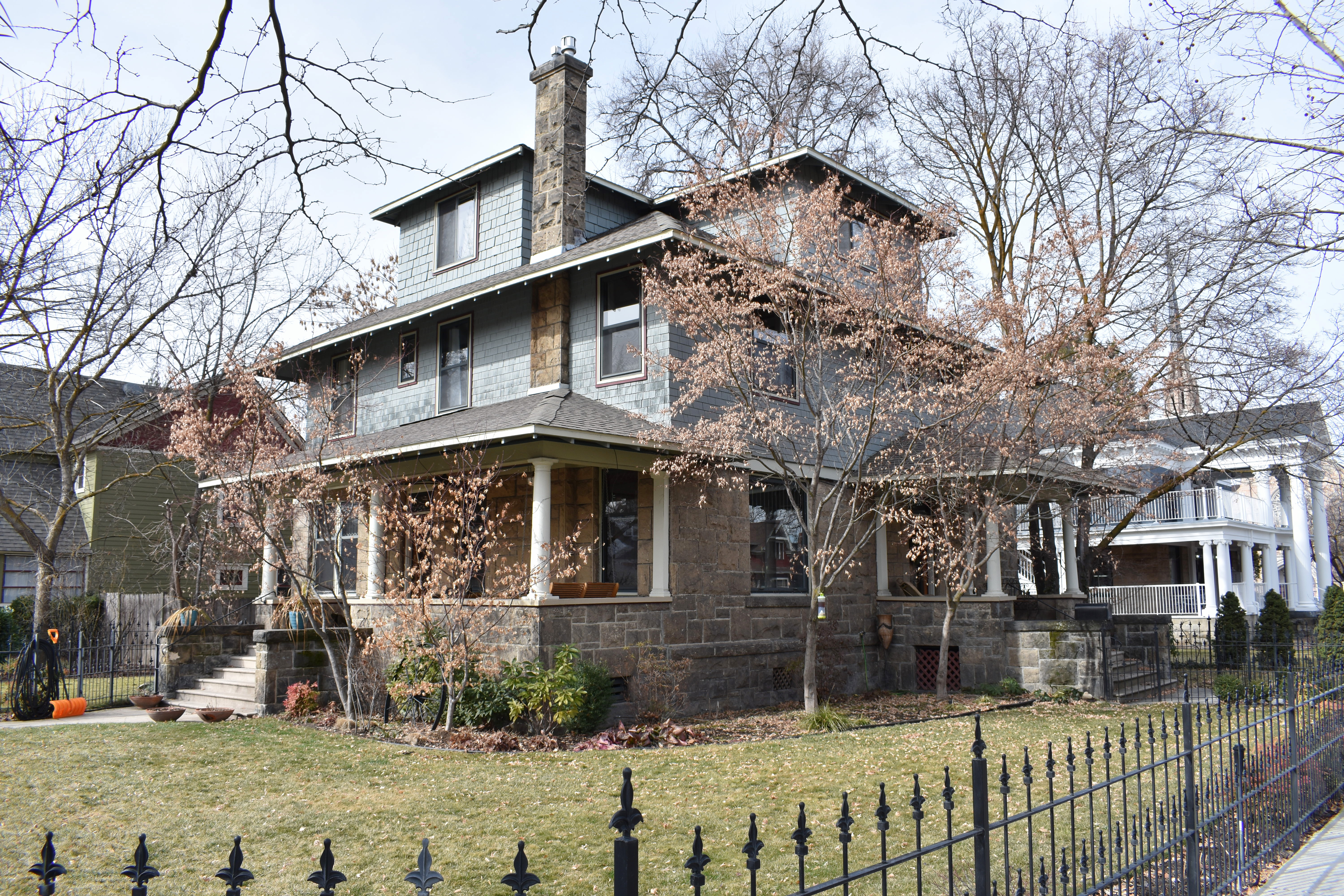
- The M.J. Marks House in 2019

- Location within Idaho Location within the United States
- Location: 1001 Hays St., Boise, Idaho
- Coordinates: 43°37′20″N 116°12′00″W
- Area: less than one acre
- Built: 1911
- Built by: McPhee & Blair
- Architect: Tourtellotte & Hummel
- Architectural style: Colonial Revival, Bungalow
- MPS: Tourtellotte and Hummel Architecture TR
- NRHP reference No.: 82000221
- Added to NRHP: November 17, 1982

The M.J. Marks House in Boise, Idaho, is a 2 1/2-story Colonial Revival house with "bungaloid features" designed by Tourtellotte & Hummel and constructed in 1911. The house includes random course sandstone veneer on first-story walls with flared second-story walls veneered with square shingles under a low pitch hip roof. Room sized porches are a prominent feature of the design.

== History ==
In 1900 Moses J. and Ella L. Marks moved to Boise from Buena Vista, Colorado, and in that year the M.J. Marks men's clothing store opened at 822 Main Street. In 1901 Marks purchased from Ellen A. Fairchild a portion of lots 10, 11, and 12 in block 81 of Boise City original townsite, located at the southwest corner of 10th and Hays Streets. Plans for the M.J. Marks House were drawn by Tourtellotte & Hummel in 1910, and the design featured Boise sandstone and rough cut, unpainted cedar shingles "left for the weather to stain in nature's own tints." Moses and Ella Marks lived at the house from its completion in 1911 until the 1920 death of Moses Marks. Ella Marks continued to reside in the house until her death in 1924.

After his mother's death, Jacob A. Marks lived in the house until his own death in 1943.

== See also ==
- Fort Street Historic District
