= Alva Fleharty House =

Historic building in Boise, Idaho

- U.S. National Register of Historic Places
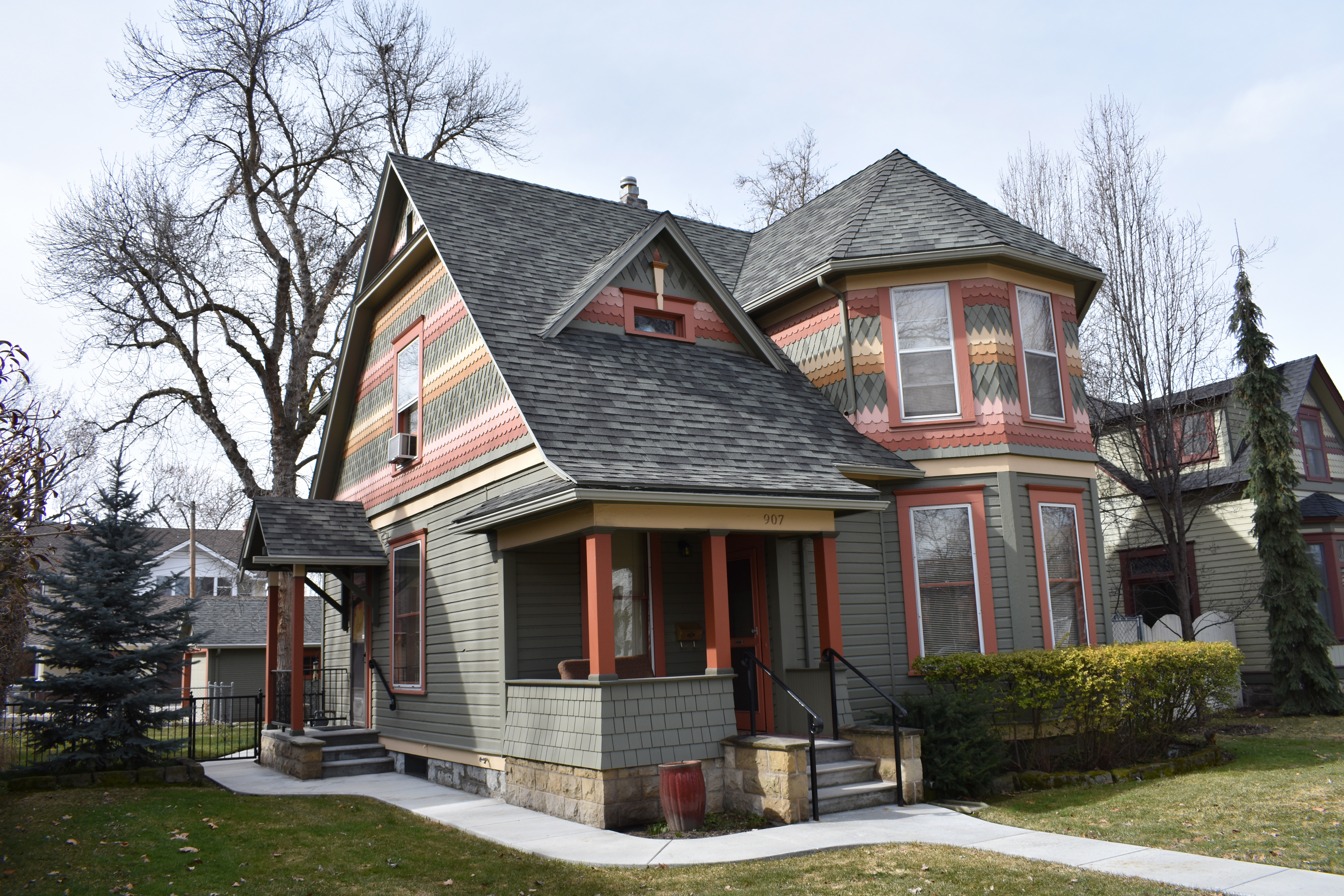
- The Alva Fleharty House in 2019

- Location within Idaho Location within the United States
- Location: 907 Hays St., Boise, Idaho
- Coordinates: 43°37′18″N 116°11′57″W
- Area: less than one acre
- Built: 1902
- Built by: Bryan, Harrison; Palmer, H.A.
- Architect: Tourtellotte, John E. & Company
- Architectural style: Queen Anne; Shingle style
- MPS: Tourtellotte and Hummel Architecture TR
- NRHP reference No.: 82000198
- Added to NRHP: November 17, 1982

The Alva Fleharty House in Boise, Idaho, is a 1 1/2-story Queen Ann house designed by Tourtellotte & Co. and constructed by H.A. Palmer and Harrison Bryan in 1902. The house reveals a shingle style influence in its gables and front, 2-story beveled bay. It was added to the National Register of Historic Places in 1982.

== Alva Fleharty ==
A native of Galesburg, Illinois, Alva Fleharty first worked for the Omaha Bee then became foreman of the composing room at the Salt Lake Tribune before moving to Boise in 1901 to manage the composing room and telegraph office at the Idaho Statesman. He worked for the Statesman over two years, but in 1903 when the West Side Index in Newman, California, was for sale Alva and Maude (Chandler) Fleharty purchased the Index and moved to California. At the time, the Flehartys had lived in the Alva Fleharty House less than one year. They sold the house to W.G.M. Allen in 1903.

Fleharty published the Index for 33 years. He died in Turlock, California, in 1947.

== See also ==
- Fort Street Historic District
- National Register of Historic Places listings in Ada County, Idaho
