= William Dunbar House =

- U.S. National Register of Historic Places
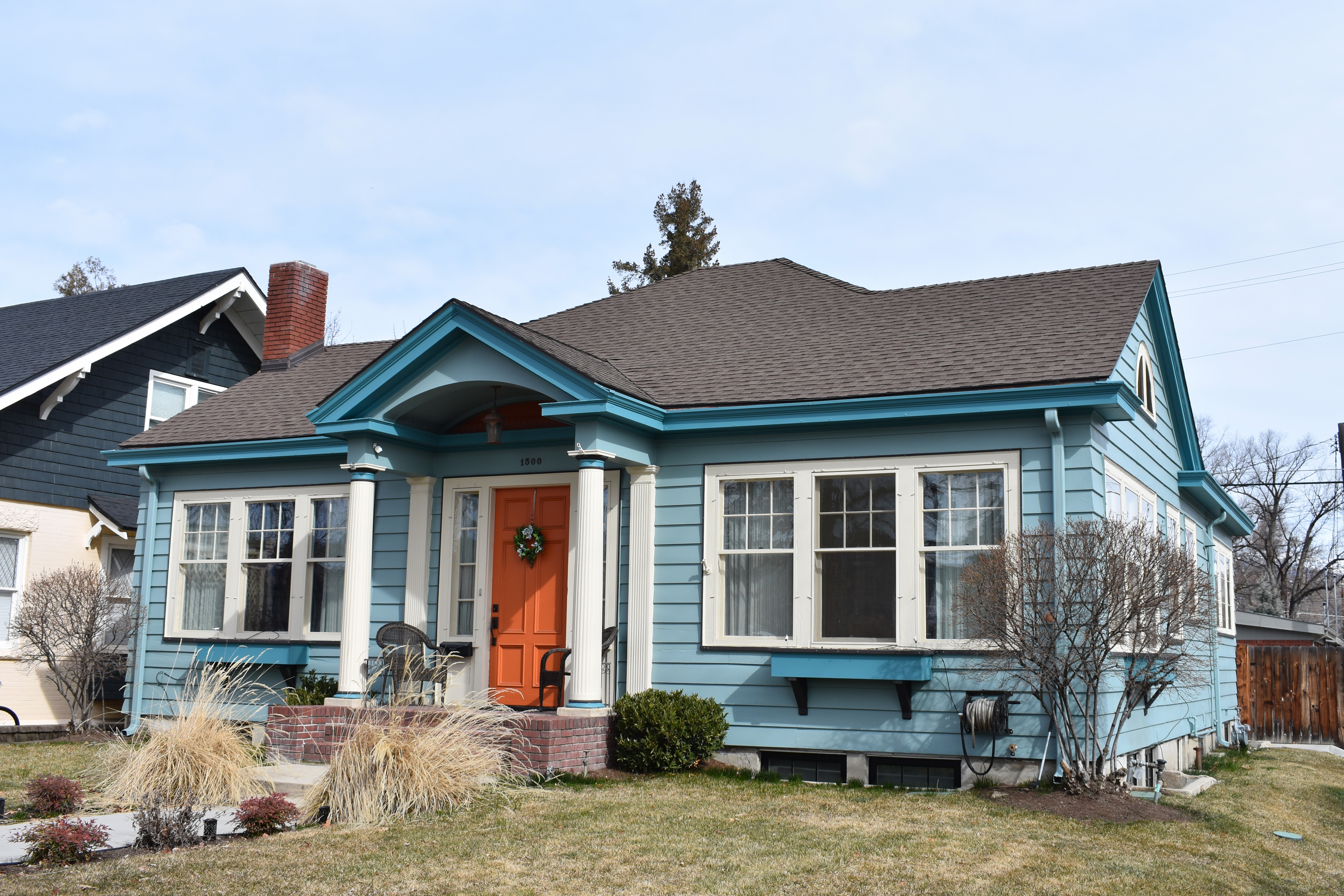
- The William Dunbar House in 2019

- Location within Idaho Location within the United States
- Location: 1500 W. Hays St., Boise, Idaho
- Coordinates: 43°37′32″N 116°12′20″W
- Area: less than one acre
- Built: 1923
- Built by: Jordan, J. O.
- Architect: Tourtellotte & Hummel
- Architectural style: Colonial Revival
- MPS: Tourtellotte and Hummel Architecture TR
- NRHP reference No.: 82000195
- Added to NRHP: November 17, 1982

The William Dunbar House in Boise, Idaho, is a 1-story Colonial Revival cottage designed by Tourtellotte & Hummel and constructed by contractor J.O. Jordan in 1923. The house features clapboard siding and lunettes centered within lateral gables, decorated by classicizing eave returns. A small, gabled front portico with barrel vault supported by fluted Doric columns and pilasters decorates the main entry on Hays Street. The house was listed on the National Register of Historic Places in 1982.

== History ==
The Dunbar House was constructed for William and Henrietta Dunbar at the corner of 15th and Hays Streets in 1923. A year after the house was completed, Etta Dunbar took second place for her front yard in a Better Gardens contest sponsored by Boise's Columbian Club in 1924.

In 1934 the attic was finished and dormers were installed. In 1940 new exterior siding was installed, the heating system was upgraded, and a basement was excavated. The roof was repaired in 1949.

== William Dunbar ==
William C. Dunbar (June 25, 1874—February 23, 1951) was an attorney and a municipal judge specializing in probate law. A few years after graduating with a law degree from Columbia University, he arrived in Boise in 1901 and taught political science at the original Boise High School (demolished) for two years. Then he became principal at the school, a post he held for one year before beginning his law practice. Dunbar was one of the early tenants of the Idaho Building, occupying office 321 until his retirement in 1950, two months before his death at the Dunbar House.

Etta Dunbar continued to live at the house at least until 1965, the year the roof was replaced. By 1982 Mrs. Dunbar still owned the house but no longer lived there.

Another William C. Dunbar lived in Caldwell prior to the 1901 arrival in Boise of Judge Dunbar. The son of Salt Lake City pioneer William C. Dunbar, he served as Canyon County recorder in the 1890s. In the 1920s J.A. Dunbar served as Canyon County recorder.

Architect James Dunbar was a drafter in the architectural firm of Tourtellotte & Co. and brother of Judge Dunbar. Later known as Tourtellotte & Hummel, the firm designed the William Dunbar House.

== See also ==
- H. C. Burnett House
- Fort Street Historic District
