= Eichelberger Apartments =

Historic NRHP building

- U.S. National Register of Historic Places
- U.S. Historic district – Contributing property
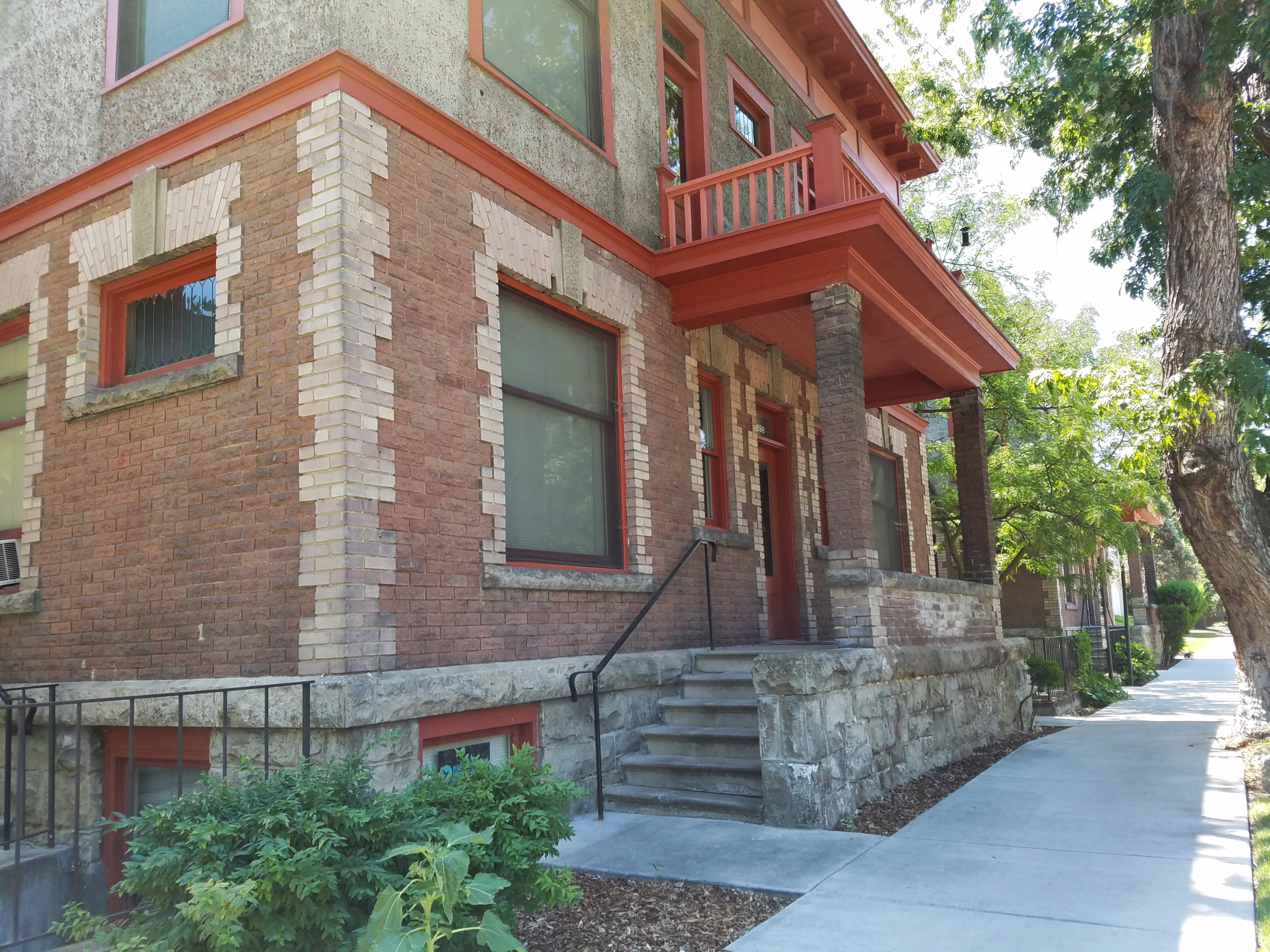
- The Eichelberger Apartments in 2018

- Location within Idaho Location within the United States
- Location: 612-24 N. 9th St. Boise, Idaho
- Coordinates: 43°37′15″N 116°11′57″W
- Area: less than one acre
- Built: 1910
- Architect: Tourtellotte & Hummel
- Architectural style: Classical Revival
- Part of: Fort Street Historic District (ID82000199)
- MPS: Tourtellotte and Hummel Architecture TR
- NRHP reference No.: 82000197
- Added to NRHP: November 17, 1982

The Eichelberger Apartments in Boise, Idaho, is a 2-story, Colonial Revival building designed by Tourtellotte & Hummel and constructed in 1910. The U-shape, brick and stucco design features corner quoins and keystoned windows with a roofline parapet covered between crested pilasters. It was included as a contributing property in the Fort Street Historic District on November 12, 1982. The building was individually listed on the National Register of Historic Places on November 17, 1982.

== Albert V. Eichelberger ==
Albert V. Eichelberger and his brothers operated a coal supply company at 930 Main Street in Boise in the early 1890s, and by 1893 the Eichelbergers had sold the business to Smith & Stover. In 1892 Eichelberger purchased 80 acres (32 ha) of land near Boise where he planted prune trees. In 1910 he became manager of the Boise Valley Fruit Growers' Association.

Eichelberger served in the Idaho legislature 1903-1904 and on the Boise City Council from 1912 until he was recalled in 1916. He supported expansion of city park land and prohibition of alcohol and dancing.

== See also ==
- National Register of Historic Places listings in Ada County, Idaho
