= Immanuel Evangelical Lutheran Church (Boise, Idaho) =

Historic church in Idaho, United States

- U.S. National Register of Historic Places
- U.S. Historic district – Contributing property
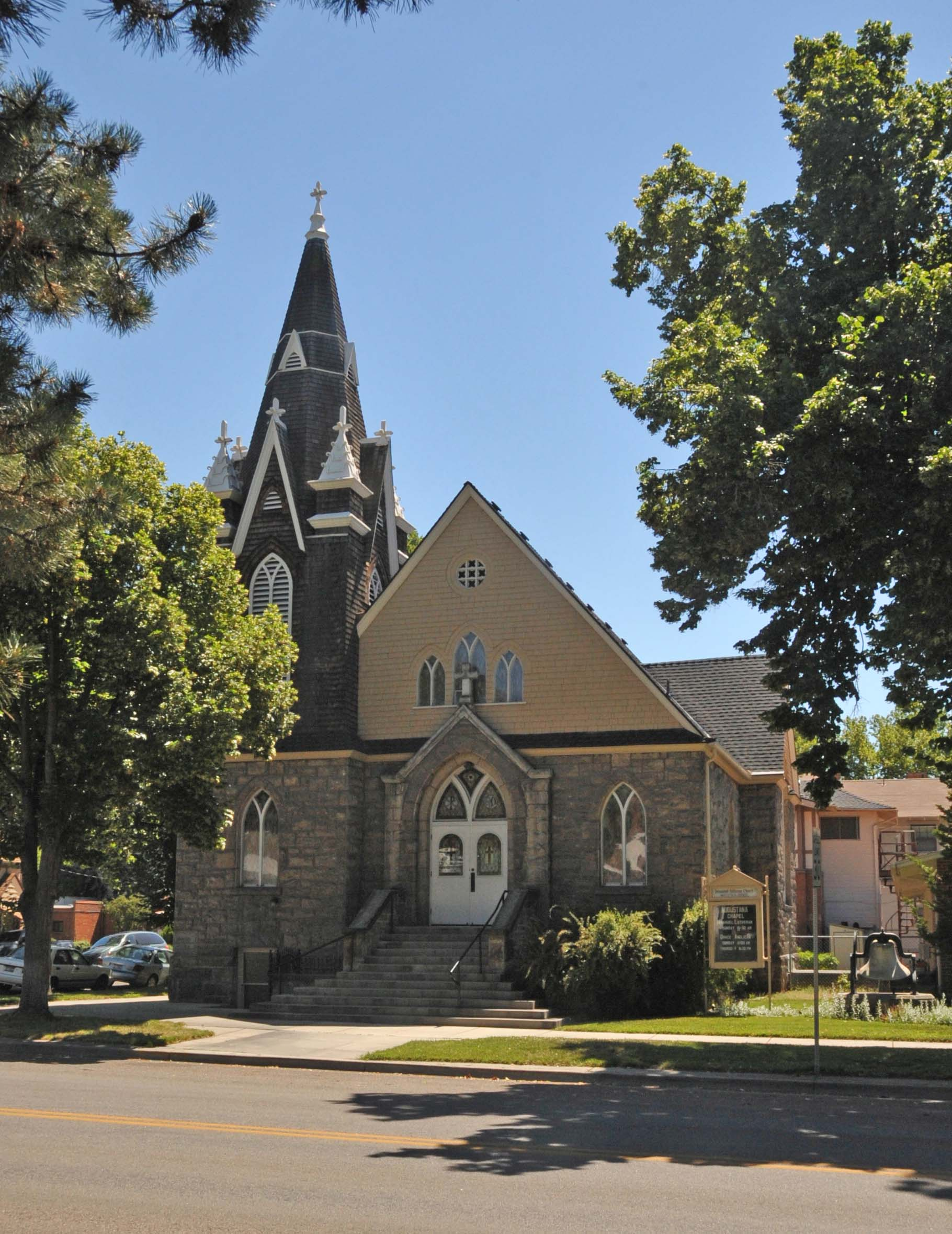

- Location within Idaho Location within the United States
- Location: 707 W. Fort St. Boise, Idaho
- Coordinates: 43°37′16″N 116°12′05″W
- Built: 1908
- Architect: Charles F. Hummel
- Architectural style: Late Gothic Revival
- Part of: Fort Street Historic District (ID82000199)
- NRHP reference No.: 76000664
- Added to NRHP: June 17, 1976

Immanuel Evangelical Lutheran Church is a Lutheran church located in Boise, Idaho. The church was individually listed on the National Register of Historic Places on June 17, 1976. It was included as a contributing property in the Fort Street Historic District on November 12, 1982.

The church was organized on January 22, 1906, as the Swedish Lutheran Church of the Augustana Synod. It was associated with the Augustana Evangelical Lutheran Church, a Lutheran church body founded by Swedish immigrants. The current church building was built in 1908 and was dedicated on September 22, 1915. Because the founders were Scandinavian, the church services were first held in the Swedish language. October 1, 1918, the church decided to change to the English language for church sermons, in an effort to appeal to Lutherans of other ethnic backgrounds. The last remaining tie to the founders' Swedish heritage was severed in 1919, when the church changed its name to Boise Evangelical Lutheran Church. In the 1950s the church was renamed again as Immanuel Evangelical Lutheran Church. Immanuel Lutheran Church is part of the Evangelical Lutheran Church in America.
