= Henry Coffin House =

Historic house in Idaho, United States

- U.S. National Register of Historic Places
- U.S. Historic district – Contributing property
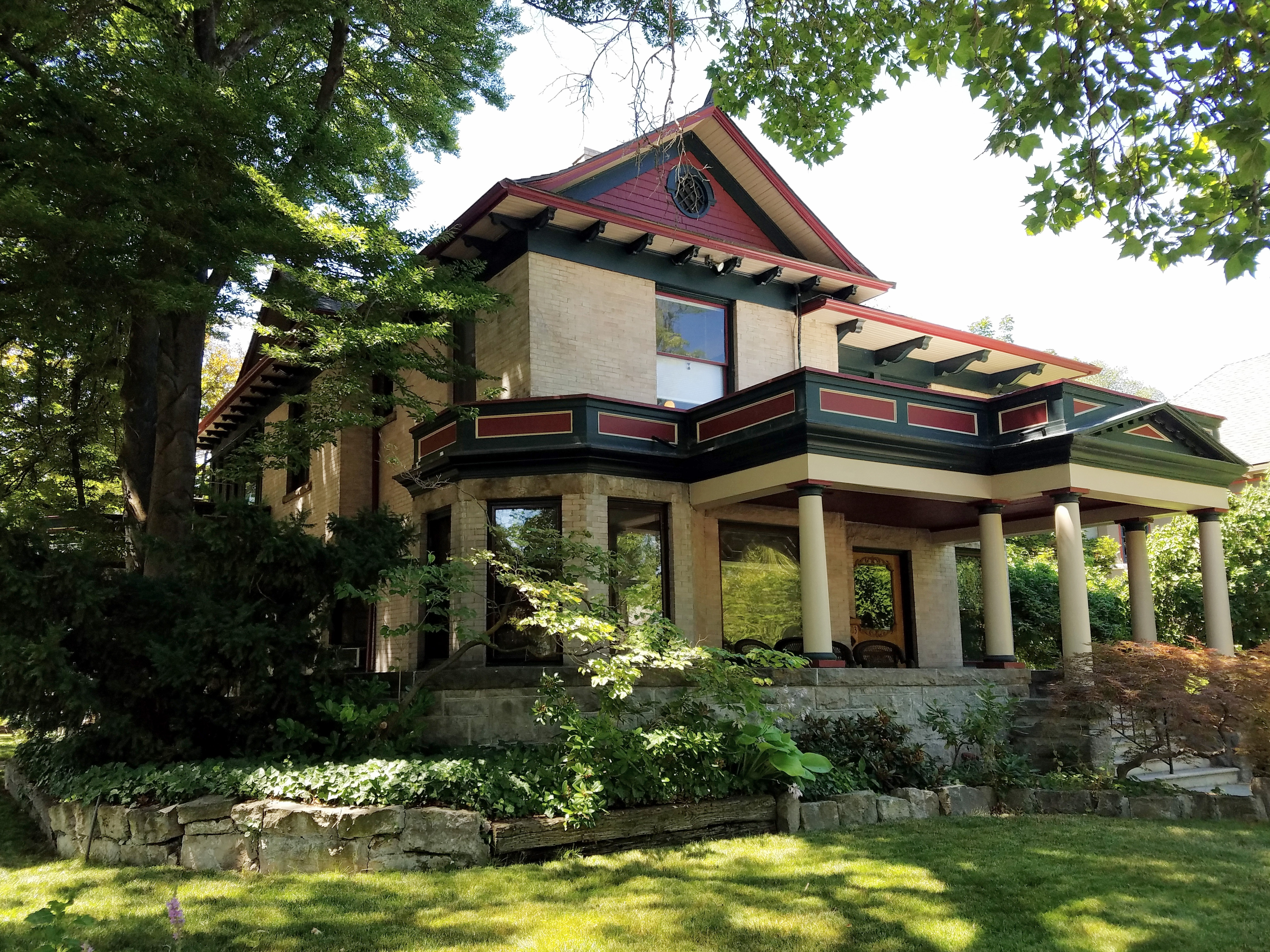
- The Henry Coffin House in 2018

- Location within Idaho Location within the United States
- Location: 1403 Franklin St., Boise, Idaho
- Coordinates: 43°37′26″N 116°12′20″W
- Area: less than one acre
- Built: 1905
- Architect: John E. Tourtellotte & Company
- Architectural style: Colonial Revival
- Part of: Fort Street Historic District (ID82000199)
- MPS: Tourtellotte and Hummel Architecture TR
- NRHP reference No.: 82000188
- Added to NRHP: November 17, 1982

The Henry Coffin House was designed by Tourtellotte & Co. and constructed in Boise, Idaho, USA, in 1905. The house is an early example of Colonial Revival architectural design by Tourtellotte, who lived across the street. It was included as a contributing property in the Fort Street Historic District on November 12, 1982. It was individually listed on the National Register of Historic Places on November 17, 1982.

A native of Annapolis, Indiana, Henry N. Coffin became a clerk at the First National Bank in Leavenworth, Kansas, then a clerk at the First National Bank in Lawrence, Kansas. He served as assistant treasurer of the State of Kansas prior to moving to Boise in 1890. In Boise he became the cashier of the First National Bank, and he helped to organize the Boise Bank of Commerce, holding the position of cashier. Coffin was elected as State Treasurer of Idaho, 1903–1904, then reelected, 1905–1906.

== See also ==
- National Register of Historic Places listings in Ada County, Idaho
