= H. C. Burnett House =

- U.S. National Register of Historic Places
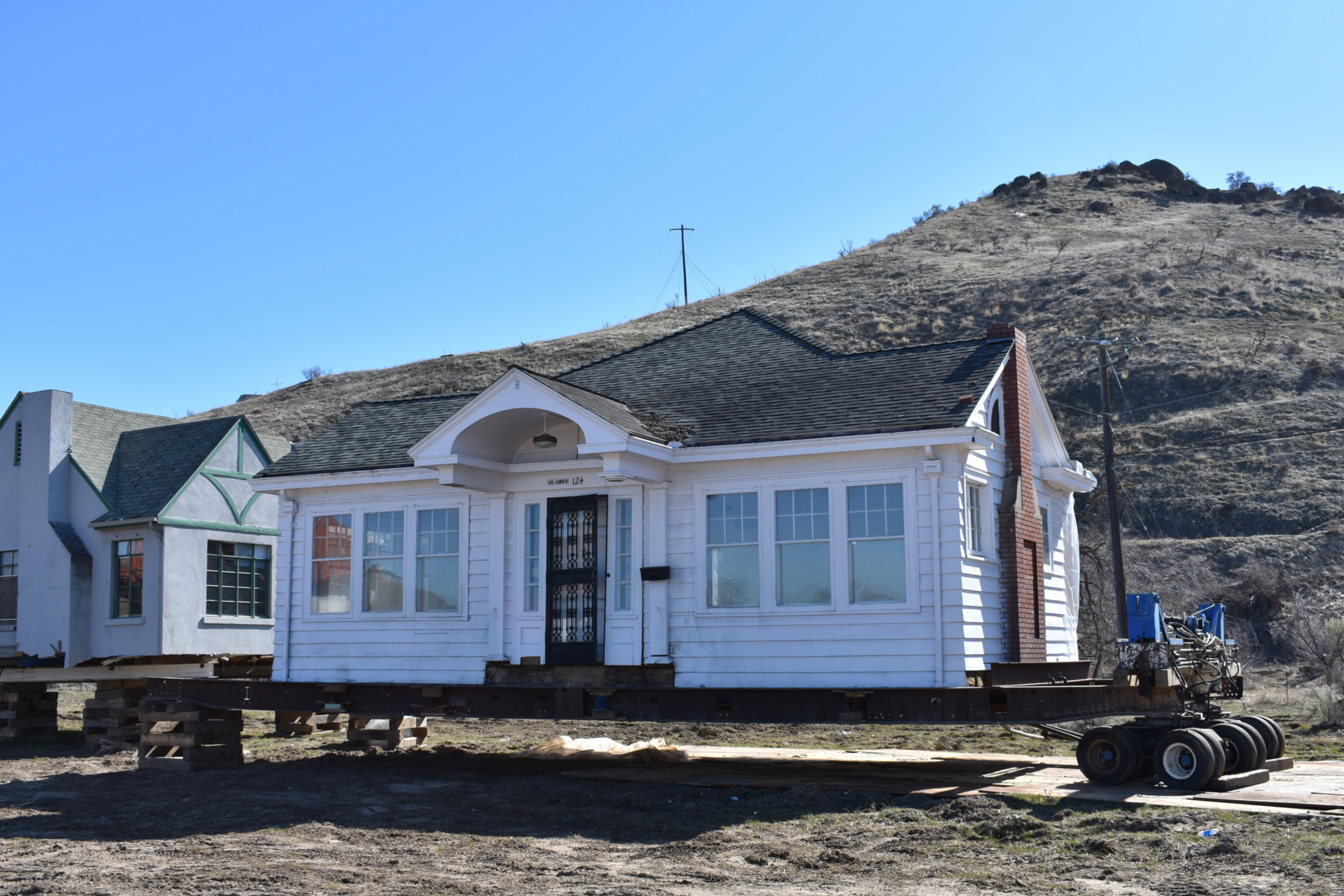
- The H.C. Burnett House in 2019

- Location within Idaho Location within the United States
- Location: 124 W. Bannock St., Boise, Idaho
- Coordinates: 43.597854°N 116.163754°W
- Area: less than one acre
- Built: 1924
- Built by: Jordan, J. O.
- Architect: Tourtellotte & Hummel
- Architectural style: Colonial Revival
- MPS: Tourtellotte and Hummel Architecture TR
- NRHP reference No.: 82000183
- Added to NRHP: November 17, 1982

The H.C. Burnett House in Boise, Idaho is a one-story Colonial Revival house designed by Tourtellotte & Hummel and constructed by contractor J.O. Jordan in 1924. The house features a centered portico with a gabled barrel vault and Tuscan columns with pilasters at the front exposure. Bisected attic lunettes decorate lateral gables. The house was added to the National Register of Historic Places in 1982.

== History ==
In 1923 Hazel Cleveland married Blaine Burnett, who with his father, Fred Burnett, owned the Burnett Shoe Company. Mrs. Burnett, also known as H.C. Burnett, contracted with Tourtellotte & Hummel to build the 6-room Burnett House in 1924. A garage was erected in 1929. The Burnetts occupied the house from its construction until 1933, when they moved to Seattle. Roy J. McCaslin later owned the Burnett House for several years.

In 2019 as part of preparation for expansion of St. Luke's Boise Medical Center, the Burnett House was moved from 124 Bannock Street to a pasture on Warm Springs Avenue, a site occupied by other historic homes.

== See also ==
- William Dunbar House
