= Fred Hottes House =

Historic building in Boise, Idaho, USA

- U.S. National Register of Historic Places
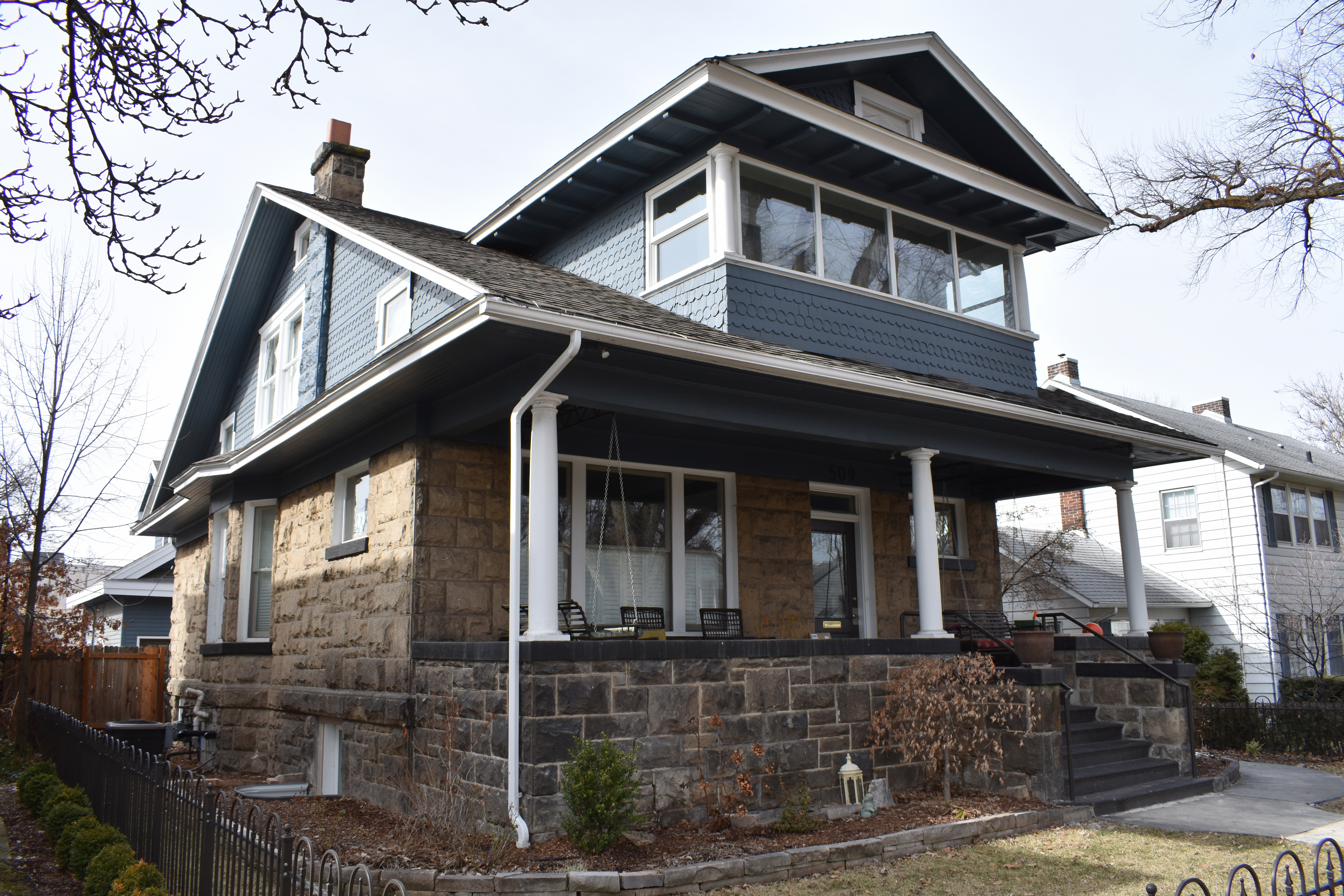
- The Fred Hottes House in 2019

- Location within Idaho Location within the United States
- Location: 509 W. Hays St., Boise, Idaho
- Coordinates: 43°37′09″N 116°11′40″W
- Area: less than one acre
- Built: 1908
- Architect: Tourtellotte, John E. & Co.
- Architectural style: Colonial Revival
- MPS: Tourtellotte and Hummel Architecture TR
- NRHP reference No.: 82000209
- Added to NRHP: November 17, 1982

The Fred Hottes House in Boise, Idaho, is a 2-story, sandstone and shingle Colonial Revival house designed by Tourtellotte & Co. and constructed in 1908. The house features a cross facade porch and a prominent, pedimented front gable. The house was added to the National Register of Historic Places in 1982.

== Fred Hottes ==
German immigrant and Idaho pioneer Fred Hottes (b. July 13, 1840, Darmstadt) was a miner at the Franklin Camp in 1862, and by 1864 he was an early resident of Idaho City. Later that year Hottes was in partnership with John Kennaly in a hardware business in Boise City, although the partnership ended in 1865. In 1893 Hottes was working as a mail messenger for the U.S. Post Office in Mascoutah, Illinois. He and his youngest son, Henry G. Hottes, purchased property in Grand Junction, Colorado, in 1901. Hottes and other members of his family were living in Palisade by 1899. Hottes returned to Boise with his son in 1908, and in that year the Fred Hottes House was designed by Tourtellotte & Co. The 7-room house was constructed at 509 Hays Street and completed in 1909. Henry G. Hottes later occupied a house across the street at 508 Hays. By 1913 Fred and Henry Hottes had returned to Colorado.

After returning to Colorado, Henry Hottes resided at the Henry G. Hottes House, a contributing resource to the North Seventh Street Historic Residential District in Grand Junction.

The eldest son of Fred Hottes, Charles Frederick Hottes (July 8, 1870—April 15, 1966), was a professor of botany at the University of Illinois.

== See also ==
- Fort Street Historic District
- National Register of Historic Places listings in Ada County, Idaho
