= J. M. Johnson House =

- U.S. National Register of Historic Places
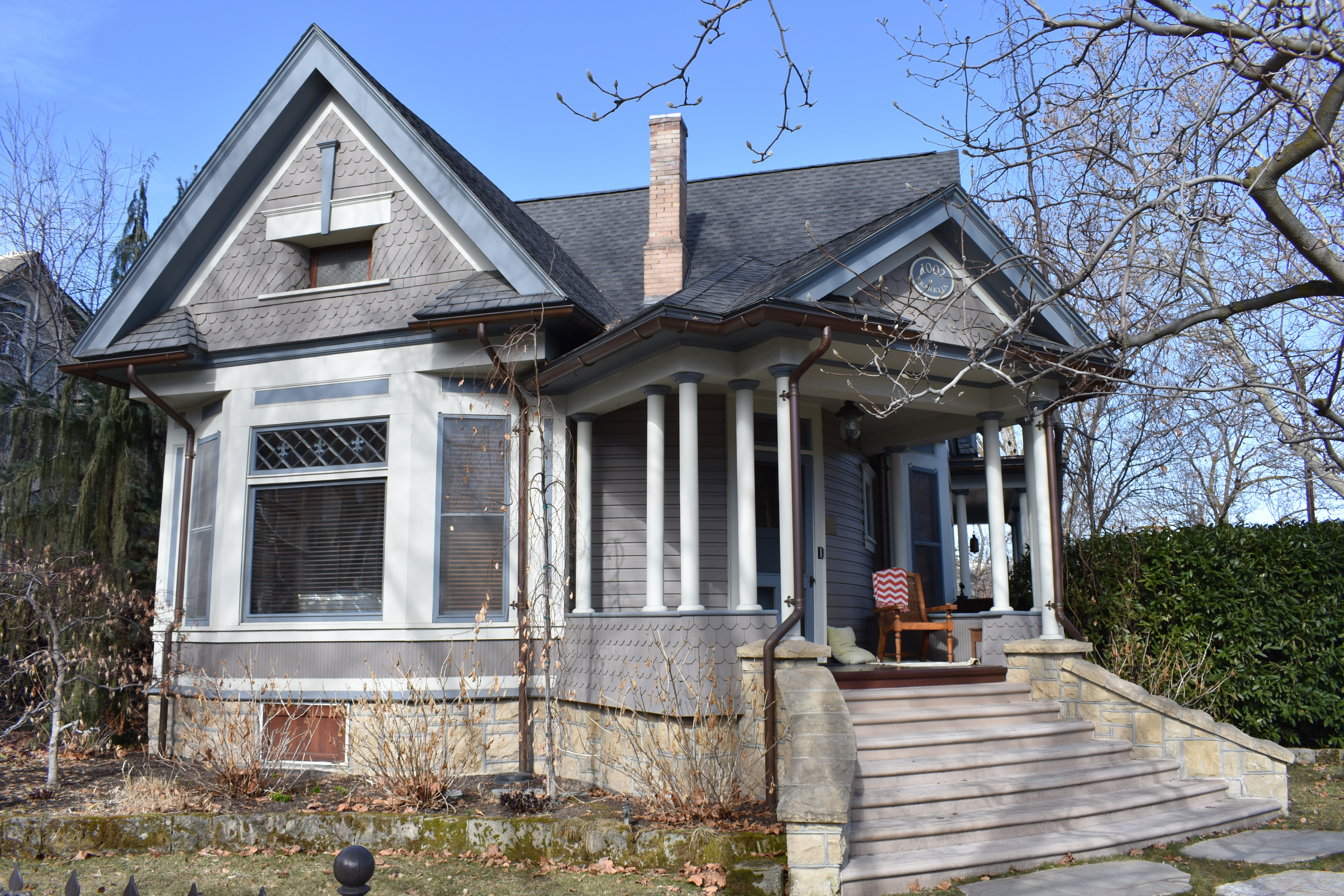
- The J.M. Johnson House in 2019

- Location within Idaho Location within the United States
- Location: 1002 Franklin, Boise, Idaho
- Coordinates: 43°37′18″N 116°12′01″W
- Area: less than one acre
- Built: 1898
- Architect: Tourtellotte, John E.
- Architectural style: Queen Anne
- MPS: Tourtellotte and Hummel Architecture TR
- NRHP reference No.: 82000215
- Added to NRHP: November 17, 1982

The J.M. Johnson House in Boise, Idaho, is a 1 1/2-story Queen Anne house designed by John E. Tourtellotte and constructed in 1898. The house includes a sandstone foundation and features a Tuscan column porch with a prominent, corner entry at 10th and Franklin Streets. A side gable with a shingled dimple window above a prominent beveled window bay are central to the Franklin Street exposure. The house was added to the National Register of Historic Places in 1982.

J.M. Johnson was a wool buyer from Mountain Home. He moved to Boise in 1898, the year of construction of the J.M. Johnson House. Among his business activities, Johnson traded in real estate and engaged in ranching. In 1919 he sold the J.M. Johnson House after purchasing a 7000-acre cattle ranch in Alturas.

== See also ==
- Fort Street Historic District
