= Minnie Priest Dunton House =

Historic house in Idaho, United States

- U.S. National Register of Historic Places
- U.S. Historic district – Contributing property
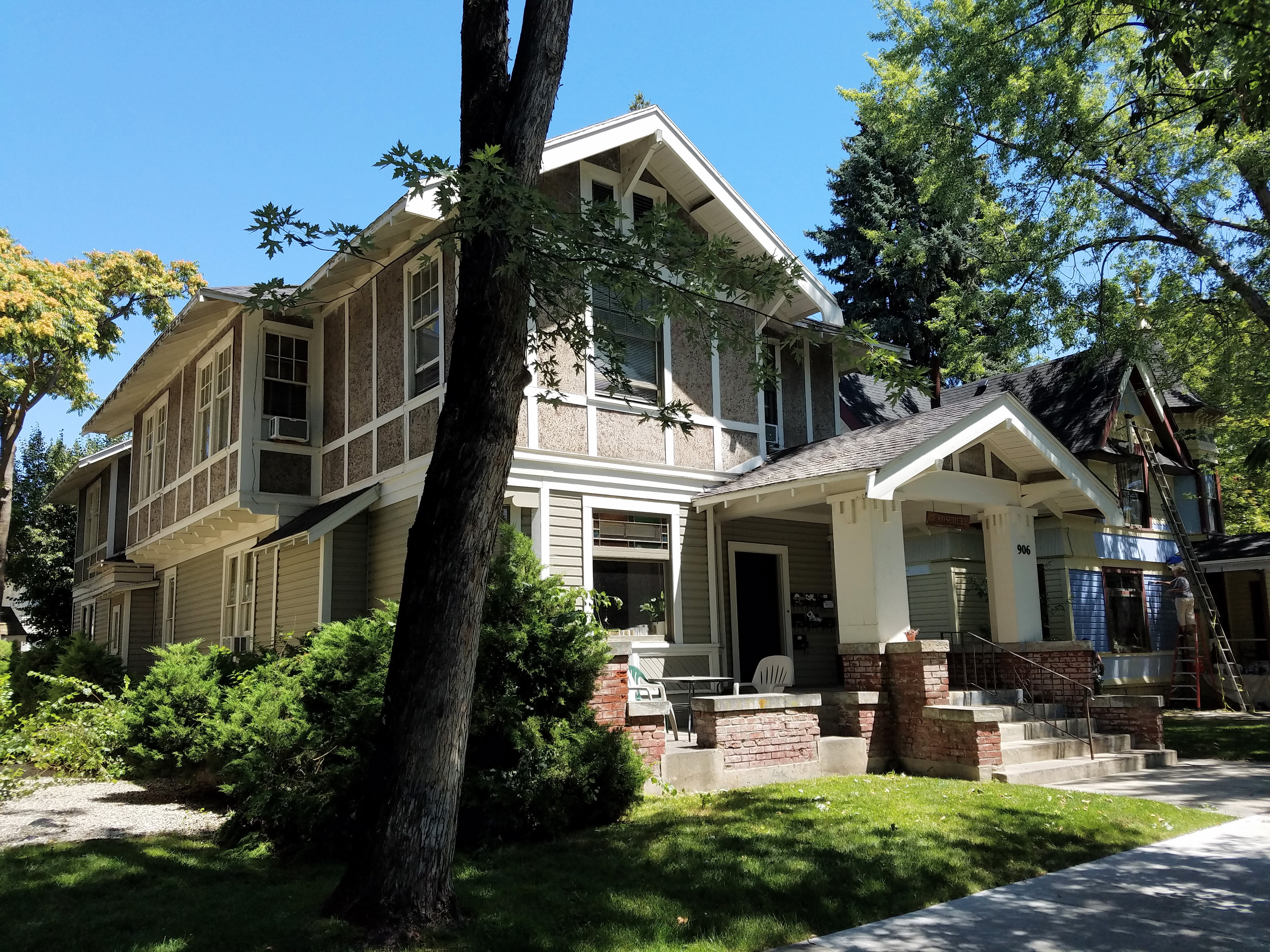
- The Minnie Priest Dunton House in 2018

- Location within Idaho Location within the United States
- Location: 906 W. Hays St. Boise, Idaho
- Coordinates: 43°37′19″N 116°11′55″W
- Built: 1899
- Architect: John E. Tourtellotte, original Tourtellotte & Hummel, remodel
- Architectural style: Queen Anne, original design Tudor Revival, remodel
- Part of: Fort Street Historic District (ID82000199)
- NRHP reference No.: 82000194
- Added to NRHP: November 17, 1982

The Minnie Priest Dunton House was designed by John E. Tourtellotte and constructed in Boise, Idaho, United States, in 1899. The original Queen Anne design was that of a single family home, but the house was remodeled by Tourtellotte & Hummel in 1913 and became a seven-bedroom boardinghouse with Tudor Revival features. Dunton named her house "Rosemere" for her rose garden. It was included as a contributing property in the Fort Street Historic District on November 12, 1982. The house was individually listed on the National Register of Historic Places on November 17, 1982.

Minnietta "Minnie" Priest Dunton was an early advocate of women's rights in Idaho, and she was appointed Idaho State Librarian in 1907. Her husband, Herbert W. Dunton, served as district attorney for Boise County, Idaho Territory, in the 1880s.

The Minnie Priest Dunton House at its 1913 Country Reflects a Change and Transformation to Flats of a Queen Anne cottage Created by John Tourtellotte to Get Herbert Dunton in 1899. The initial arrangement is observable whilst the shiplapped, clip-cornered very first narrative of today's construction; stained-glass Queen Anne strip lights live at the top panel of the primary front doorways. Even the full stucco along with Halftimbered 2nd narrative, a stairhall to achieve this, a back inclusion featuring the operator's quarters, and also a bungaloid porch are the result of this 1913 remodelling. In its centre, the next narrative has a key hipped roof using a brief lateral seam. The roofline is further complicated with a counter forward over the authentic polygonal bay, and a gable on a second-story oriel bay, and also hipped and discard roofs across the left side oriel along with side and back ells. The front-facing gables of the roofing and also the little beginning porch possess a very low bungaloid pitch and also are encouraged on the flattened figure four mounts. Trimmed rafters are vulnerable under most lateral eaves. The gabled entrance porch in front is encouraged on blocky wooden articles using geometric decreased capitals. The reduced - est amount with this parapet wall, both notched with corner pedestals, goes round the front part of your home at the form of a patio wall. The arrangement, which looks like it'd have been meant to encourage that a continuation of this porch, looks precisely in this manner in the drawings to front altitude. In reality, but for the inclusion of an iron central railing in the cement stoop, your house looks completely obliterated out of the 1913 state.

== Significance ==
Even the Dunton household is significant like a spectacular instance of plasma and stylistic overlay attained within a broad remodeling. Spatially, the transformation has been surpassed by the Hays dwelling remodeling, even in that an 1890s composition completely vanished; the Dunton household at least pitched the present ground space of this 1899 cabin, as'd the Bishops' dwelling endeavor of 1–900. Stylisticallythis renovation indicates that a various hopscotching of phases: at which Bishop Funsten's job shifted an early provincial Queen Anne household into your overdue and far more complicated one particular, the Dunton endeavor inserted to an nonetheless discernible late Queen Anne cabin the versions of this bungalow fashion and also the often-associated Tudor resurrection and geometraicized ancient themes. It generated in Boise a hybrid kind comprising within an lone arrangement a few phases of developmental type, at the exact same fashion the 1899-1916 Kurtz-Van Sicklin dwelling does in Weiser. Herbert Dunton, operator of this initial $1,400 cabin, was a Boise law firm. Minnie Priest Dunton, that commissioned the most revolutionary renovation that changed the Dunton cabin to some boardinghouse or apartment with 7 bedrooms to the upper narrative that was a librarian in the Idaho State Law Library. A paper study about the conclusion of this endeavor claimed 906 Hays has been"one of those fine dwellings of this metropolis. The enlarged household was documented to comprise: two bedrooms, 2 bathrooms, steam heating and another modern advantage. Every single bedroom includes cold and hot water, so this wood work is white enamel using veneer trim, and also each chamber includes a mirrored doorway. Mrs. Dunton has given her Residence
