= William Sidenfaden House =

- U.S. National Register of Historic Places
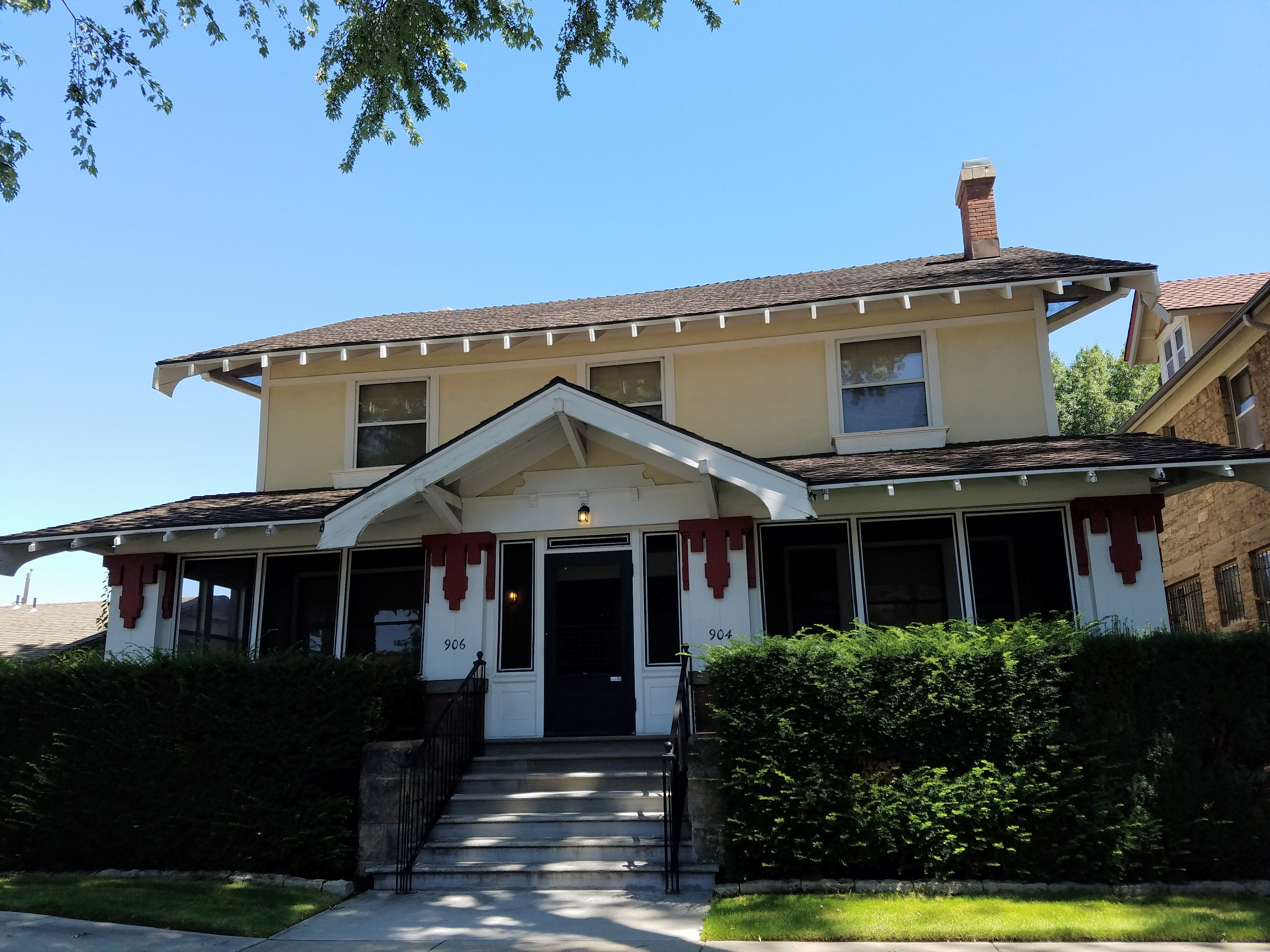
- Sidenfaden House in 2018

- Location within Idaho Location within the United States
- Location: 906 N 9th St. Boise, Idaho
- Coordinates: 43°37′17″N 116°11′59″W
- Built: 1912
- Architect: Tourtellotte & Hummel
- Architectural style: Bungalow
- NRHP reference No.: 82000241
- Added to NRHP: November 17, 1982

The William Sidenfaden House is a Bungalow designed by Tourtellotte & Hummel and constructed in Boise, Idaho, USA, in 1912. The house is part of Boise's Fort Street Historic District, and it was listed on the National Register of Historic Places on November 17, 1982.

William Sidenfaden moved to Boise in 1906 and began a partnership with undertaker Adolph Schreiber. Schreiber, formerly of the mortuary firm Schreiber & Brennan, was reelected coroner of Ada County, Idaho, in that year and continued as Sidenfaden's partner in the new firm, Schreiber & Sidenfaden, Funeral Directors and Licensed Embalmers.

== See also ==
- Adolph Schreiber House
