= Oakwood Friends School =

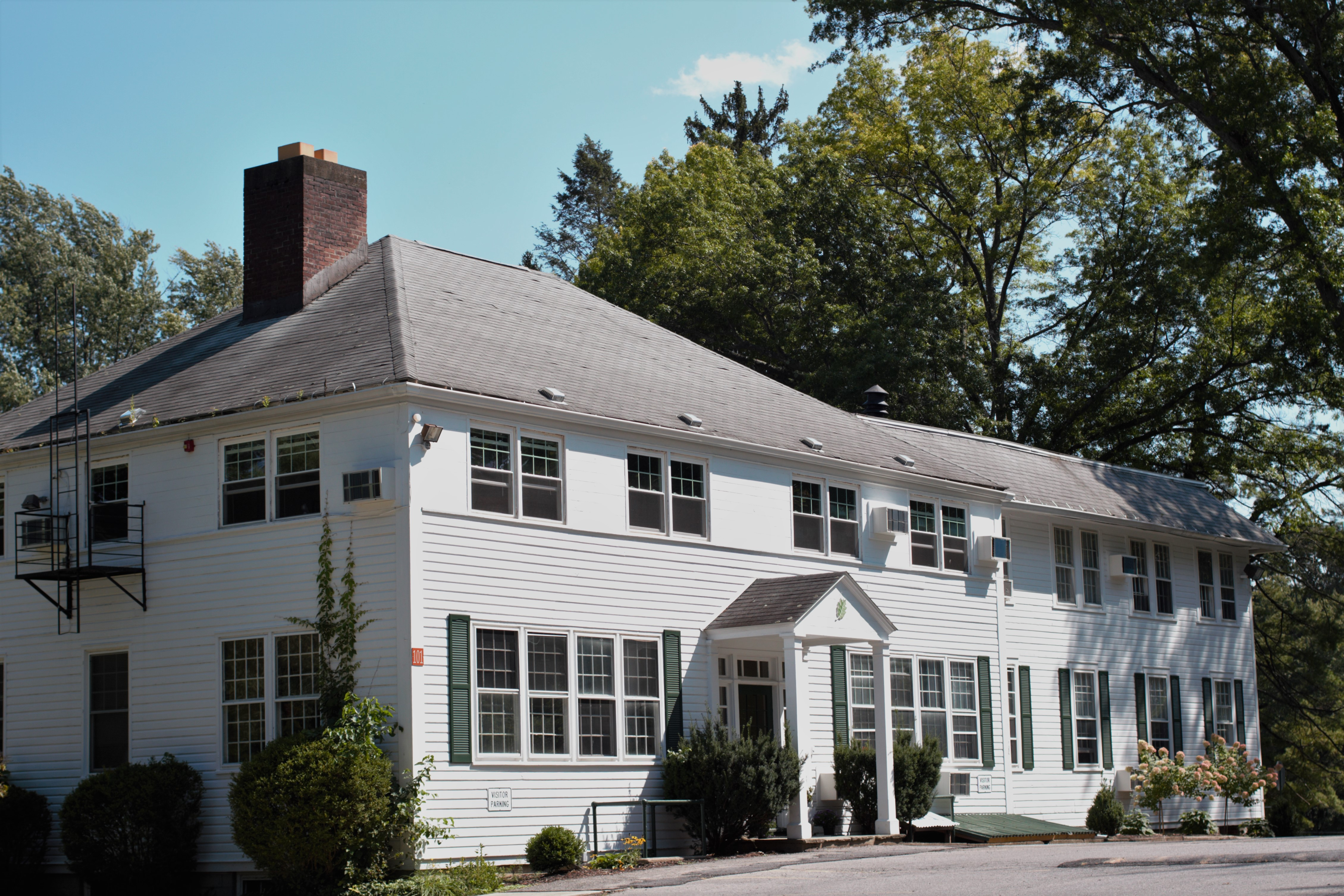

Location
- 41.6555°N 73.9269°W

Information
- School type: Private school Boarding and day
- Founded: 1796
- CEEB code: 334625
- President: Annette Engler
- Dean: Willow Joffee
- Principal: Anna Bertucci
- Head of school: Charles Cianfrani, Jr.
- Grades: 6–12
- Gender: Co-ed
- Average class size: 9
- Student to teacher ratio: 1:8
- Campus size: 55 acres
- Colors: Orange and green
- Athletics conference: Hudson Valley Athletic League
- Sports: Soccer, cross country, volleyball, basketball, tennis, softball, baseball, ultimate frisbee
- Mascot: Lions
- Accreditation: National Association of Independent Schools (NYSAIS)
- Newspaper: Oak Leaves
- Endowment: $10 million
- Website: oakwoodfriends.org

Oakwood Friends School is a private, independent, co-educational boarding and day school located at 22 Spackenkill Road in the town of Poughkeepsie, New York. With roots going back to Nine Partners Boarding School, founded in 1796, it is the oldest co-educational boarding and day school in New York state. It is accredited by the New York State Association of Independent Schools.

== Nine Partners School ==
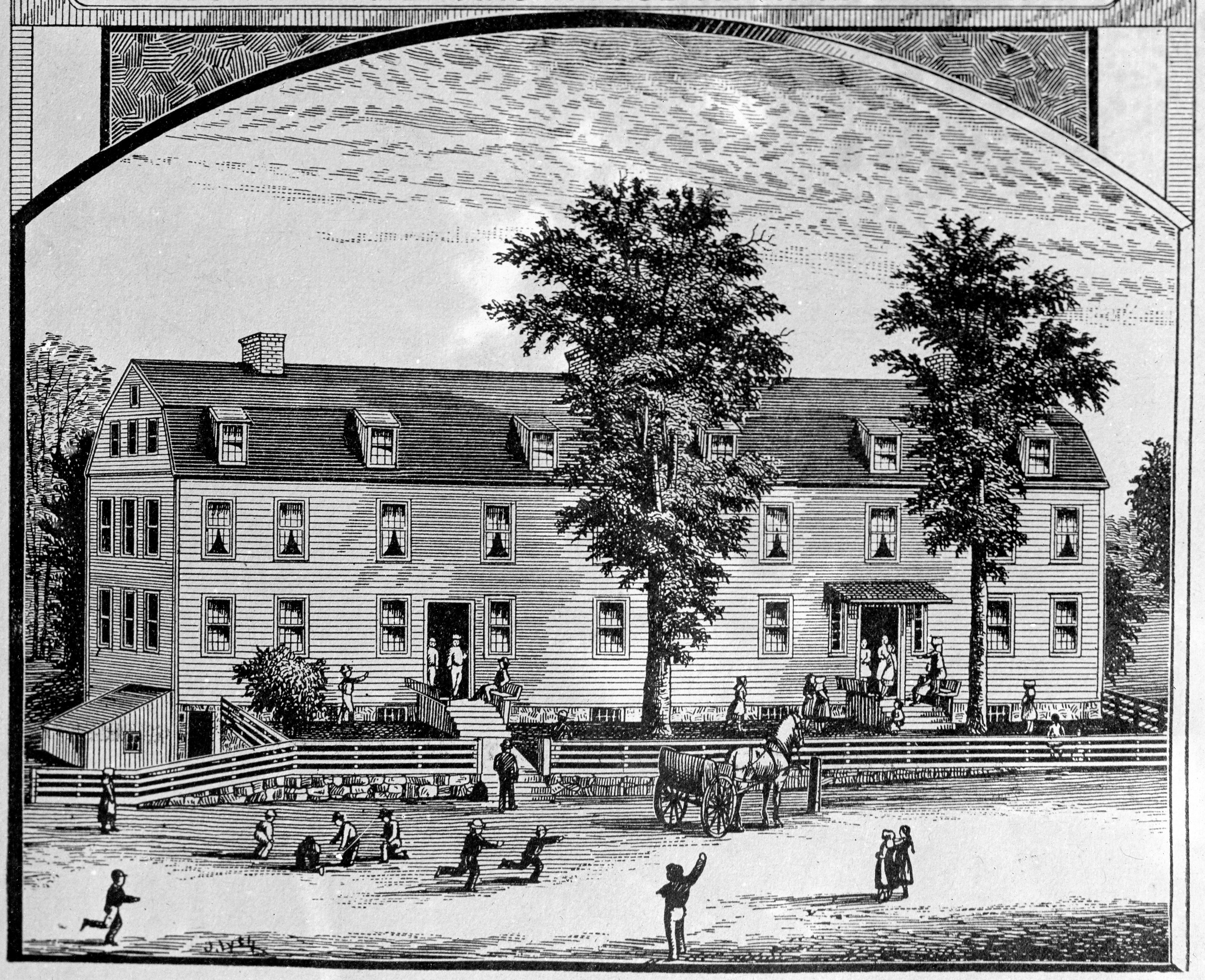
Nine Partners Boarding School, 1820

In 1794, the New York Yearly Meeting appointed a committee of twenty-five to establish a school; their first meeting was on January 13, 1795. On May 1 of that year the New York Yearly Meeting purchased a house and ten acres from Joseph Mabbet, a Quaker from Connecticut, for 1600 pounds, a down payment of 214 pounds was made from the donors, Tripp Mosher, Isaac Thorn, William Thorn, Joseph Talcott, Shadrach Richetson and Jonathan Deuel. With plans of opening a school for the children of nearby Quaker families, it opened on December 20, 1796, and was given the name Nine Partners School in Mechanic, which is now in South Millbrook, New York. This was the state's first co-educational boarding and day school. The school's first superintendent was R. Tripp Mosher, and its first principal was Jonathan Talcott, a children's book publisher. The school had a total of one hundred students: 70 boys and 30 girls. The children were between the ages of seven and fourteen years old for girls, and up to age fifteen for boys.

A teacher at the school was Jacob Willets, one of the first pupils its opening day of the school. He became the head teacher in 1806 and taught until 1828. He was the author of an arithmetic text, a geography text and an atlas, textbooks which were highly recommended and extensively used throughout the academic day. His wife Deborah, also a former pupil, became a teacher of grammar and mathematics. They were head teachers together and contributed to the school's success during its early years.

Another teacher and former pupil was Lucretia Coffin Mott, who entered the school at age thirteen in 1806 and graduated in 1810. While there, she met teacher James Mott, son of one of the founders, whom she married in 1811. Lucretia later led abolition and women’s suffrage campaigns as well as working as a teaching assistant.

Around that same era, a notable student of the school was Daniel Anthony, who would one day become the father of Susan B. Anthony, another famed early pioneer of women's suffrage.

== Friends Academy and Oakwood Seminary ==
In 1853, the school and its land was sold to a private party who kept it until 1863. In 1857 the New York Yearly Meeting was eager to open a boarding school in Union Springs in central New York. On September 1 of that year a property southwest of the town of Auburn was purchased for $9,842. The first day of classes was May 11, 1858, with grades 1–12, with only four boarders and twenty day students. At this time the school was officially known as Friends Academy. On March 23, 1876, the school officially changed its name to Oakwood Seminary, however the first unofficial reference to the school's name as Oakwood appears in 1863.

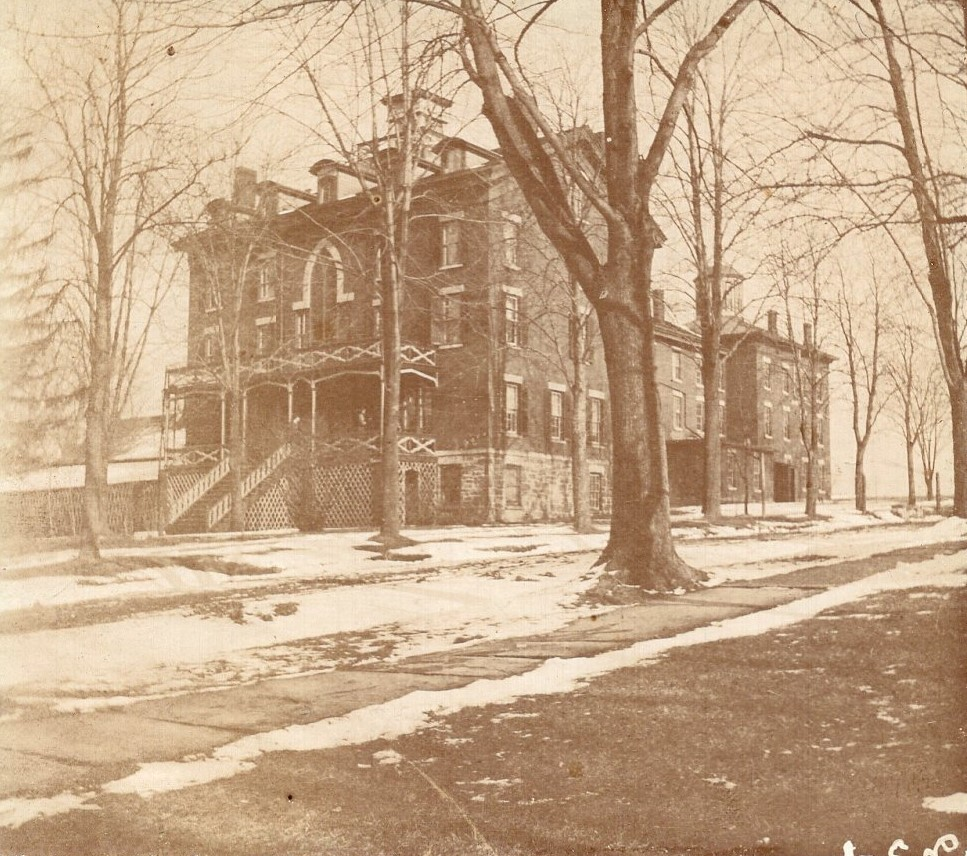
Main Building in Union Springs, 1905

On January 2, 1917, a fire damaged the upper levels of the main building, prompting the Board of Managers to consider the school's future. It was decided that due to the fire damage, coupled with declining enrollment, that the school would relocate. In 1920, the school purchased the 75-acre Coleman Farm in Poughkeepsie, New York. The final graduation at Oakwood in Union Springs was held in June 1920. It was estimated that in its 62 years of existence in Union Springs the school saw over 3,500 students pass through its doors.

== Oakwood School ==
Its first day of operation was on September 28, 1920, with a total of 112 students in grades 1–12. About 58 were Quaker. Although proper buildings were not ready on its opening day, the school was quickly reorganized to comply with the regulations of the state.

The large racehorse stables were converted into the main building, with the upper floors as the girls' dormitory. The stairs between the floors were yet to be built, with wooden ramps for the first months of school. The doors had no knobs. The meeting room, as it is now known, was called the Assembly Room, and was nearly completed in the first year of school in 1920, until it was released that the room violated a building code which caused them to drop the floor several inches, explaining why the windows are up so high. The Assembly Room was redone in 1965, renamed to the Meeting Room, and benches were constructed. It wasn't until 1994 that the Meeting Room was remodeled with carpet and laminate flooring.

In the summer of 1920 a two-story structure began to be built, but there were not funds to complete it, so they used two army barracks from the first world war and attached them to both sides of the preexisting building. This was described in a 1921 article in the Oakwood Bulletin: "As temporary quarters for boys, two army barracks have been secured and are to be joined to a permanent, bell-built center. This will contain boys' dormitories, apartments for teachers, and a large reading room for the boys, in addition to toilets, showers and lavatories." The two army barracks were transported to the campus by train from Massachusetts, the school having purchased them directly from the US Government.

The first building built during the school's operation was Lane Auditorium, begun in March 1923. It was announced that the building would be named for Aaron H. Lane, the president of the board of managers. The building was completed in the autumn of 1924 but the school could not afford both plumbing and electricity in the building at that time. The building last served as a gym in 1959 when it was converted into what was called the Fine Arts and Student Recreation Center. The name quickly changed back to the Aaron H. Lane Auditorium and was used only as a theater thereafter.

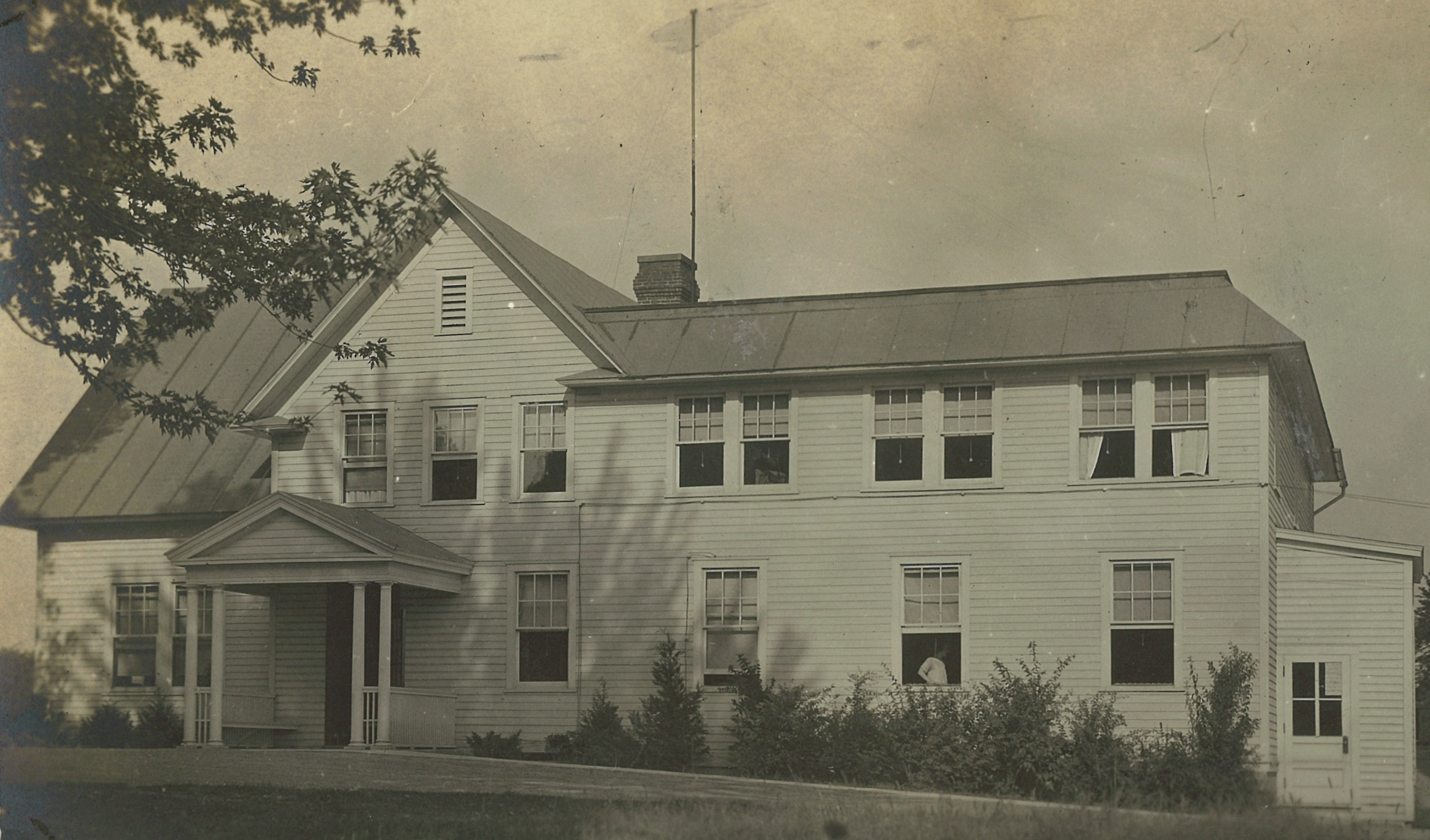
Main building, 1930s

The campus began to grow in the coming years. In 1927 a faculty cottage was built on the north side of the dining hall, and it also served as the infirmary. In 1928 the Gulley House was purchased and renamed Henderson Cottage, which housed students. That same year the cottage later known as Craig Cottage was given to the school. In 1929 the boys' dormitory called "The Boys Barracks" was renovated and two wings replaced the old army barracks. The building could house 64 boys and all single male teachers. Also that year, the Wallace Dempster Williams Library was established, and opened in early 1930 in the Main Building. That year, cement pathways were constructed, and the school discontinued the front hay field to construct athletic fields.

Despite the school having purchased their campus from a former farm, they still maintained the property as such. In 1931, the school had "six cows producing 75 qts milk per day, ten pigs, sixteen head of sheep and twelve lambs." The pigs and lambs were cared for by students and sold at the end of each year. In 1934, Oakwood made great strides to accept the school's first African American student. Enrolled as an eighth grader, he went on to graduate in 1938.Twenty years after the move to Poughkeepsie, the school underwent a major renovation that significantly changed the exterior of the main building.

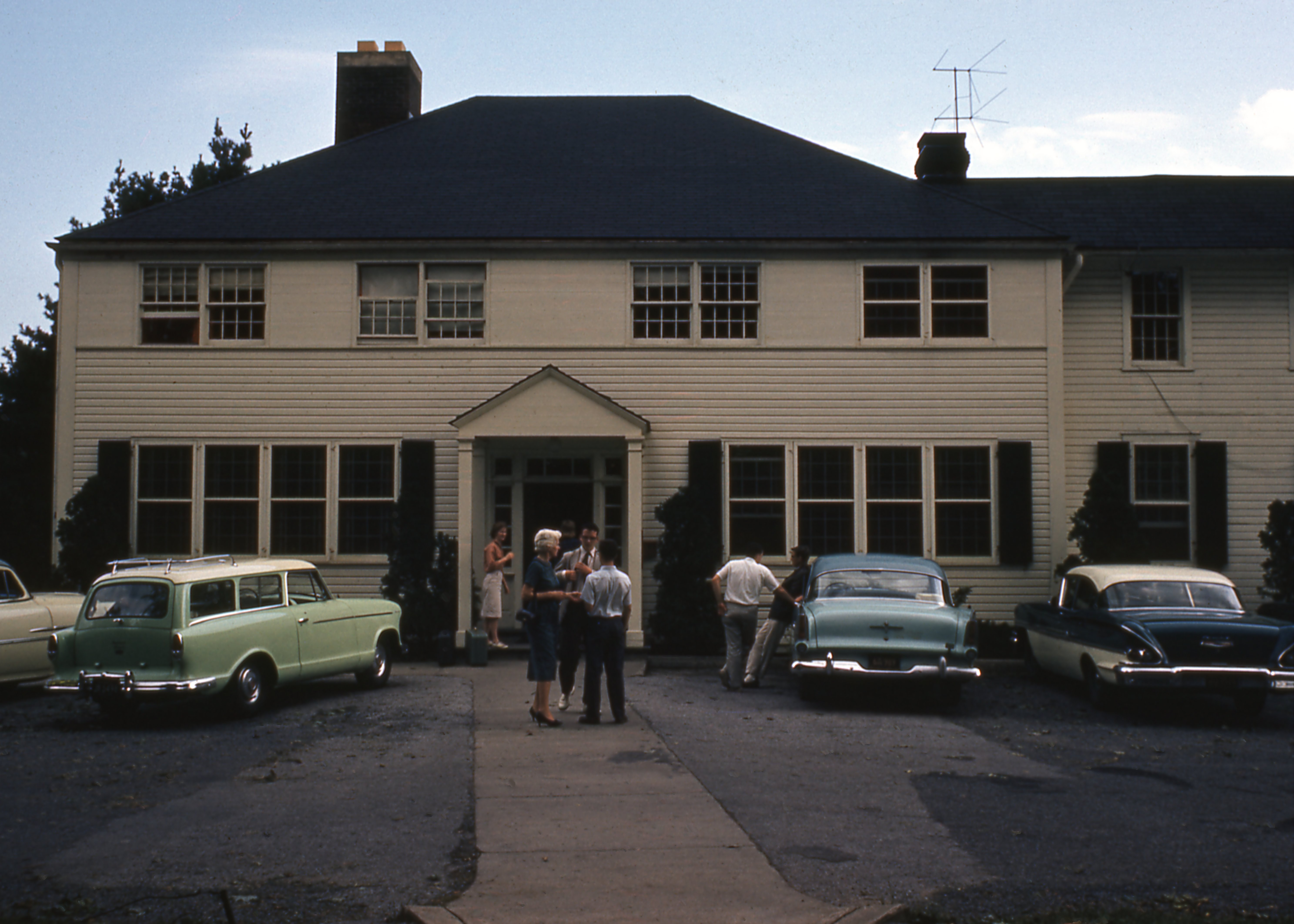
Main building, 1960

In 1946 the school celebrated the 150th anniversary of the opening of Nine Partners Boarding School. To mark this occasion, a grand celebration was organized from November 9 to November 11, 1946. There were several speakers over this three day celebration, the most notable of whom was First Lady Eleanor Roosevelt who spoke in A. H. Lane Gymnasium on the third day. Other speakers included Dorothy Canfield Fisher and a telegram from former president Herbert Hoover was read. The celebration concluded with a meeting for worship service in Nine Partners Meeting House in Millbrook. Principal William Reagan noted, "Many changes have taken place in this community and in this nation in the intervening 150 years. Unchanged, however, is the need for education and the spirit in which Nine Partners' (now Oakwood) school was founded. In answer to this need and hand in hand with the original spirit, Oakwood school has grown greatly in its first century and a half. Its home community - as well as the administration and alumni - expects the next 150 years to show comparable progress at Oakwood.” The event also began a fundraising campaign to construct a girls’ dormitory on campus and to pay off the mortgage on the property.

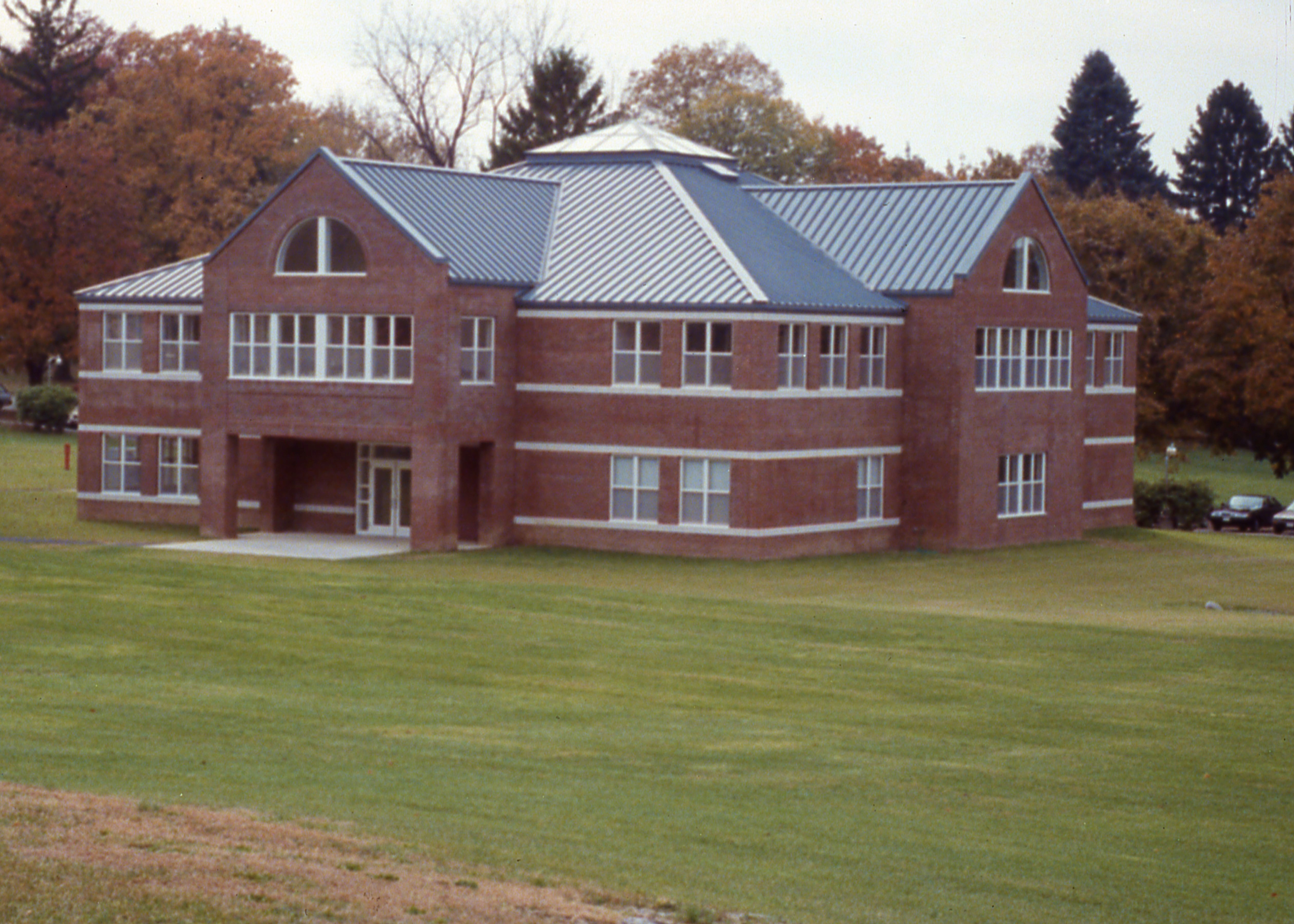
Collins Library, 1990

In 1952 the first wing of the new girls' dormitory was built. In 1956 the final wing was completed and a dedication ceremony named the building, Craig Hall in honor of Ruth E. Craig who had served as the assistant principal for 33 years (1923–1956). In 1959 the gymnasium was built and dedicated to board members Ralph Connor and his family. The former gymnasium was renovated that same year into the school's theater. From 1961 to 1963, three boys' dormitories were built on campus. In May 1963 a dedication ceremony took place naming the dormitories: Reagan Hall in honor of former principal William J. Reagan; Newlin Hall in honor of long-time teacher and administrator J. Curtis Newlin; and Taylor Hall in honor of long-time teacher and athletic director Paul Taylor. During the 1960s the school's enrollment rose significantly. In 1967 it had its peak enrollment total at 210 students. In November 1967 a fire began in the Old Boys Dormitory and Classroom Building. The building was evacuated and no injuries were reported. However, the building was destroyed and the Board of Managers decided not to rebuild it. Instead, in 1968 plans to build two smaller classroom buildings began. In 1970, the two classroom buildings were completed and a dedication ceremony took place naming the buildings Stokes and Crowley, in honor of teachers Martha Crowley and Ida B. Stokes. During the 1970s the school's enrollment fell, resulting in financial difficulties. By the early 1980s enrollment began to steadily increase. In 1988, construction on the new library began. In 1990 the building was completed and a dedication ceremony took place naming the library, Collins Library in honor of alumnus Robert Collins '48. At the ceremony, Poet Laureate and Alumni, Mark Strand '52, was the keynote speaker. In 1997, the new math and science building was completed. In 1999 it was dedicated in honor of former board president, Robert Turner and his wife Sue.

Under the Lighting the Way Campaign a series of significant improvements to the school's campus began in 2014. Starting with the renovation of the first floor of the Main Building and in 2015 the school unveiled a two-acre solar array field, making it fully sufficient on renewable energy. In 2020 the fifth grade program was added to the school's middle school program.

In September 2021 the school celebrated its 100th anniversary at its Poughkeepsie location.

== Sports ==
Sport	Level of play	Season	Gender
Soccer	V, JV, MS	Fall	Boys, girls
Volleyball	V, JV	Fall	Girls
Badminton		Fall	Co-ed
Cross-country	V	Fall	Boys, girls
Basketball	V, JV, MS	Winter	Boys, girls
Fitness program		Winter	Co-ed
Baseball	V	Spring	Boys
Softball	V	Spring	Girls
Ultimate frisbee	V, JV	Spring	Co-ed
Tennis	V	Spring	Boys, girls

== Notable alumni ==
- James Mott, abolitionist, attended 1804–1806
- Lucretia Coffin Mott, abolitionist, attended 1806–1809
- Abigail Mott Moore, abolitionist, attended 1807–1810
- Richard Mott, mayor of Toledo, Ohio and state representative, attended 1815–1817
- Julia Wilbur, abolitionist, suffergette and relief worker, attended 1829–1831
- Elihu Anthony, abolitionist and founder of the city of Santa Cruz, California, attended 1832-1833
- Rhoda Titus Esmond, philanthropist, temperance leader, and author, attended 1838-1839.
- Jane Slocum, educator and lecturer, founder of the Idaho Industrial Institute, class of 1861
- Eliza Maria Mosher, physician, educator, founder of the American Posture League, professor of physiology at Vassar College, class of 1862
- Charles E. Courtney, professional rower and rowing captain at Cornell University 1883–1920, class of 1867
- Ethelwyn Wetherald, journalist and poet, class of 1875
- George Aaron Barton, author and clergyman, class of 1879
- Frank L. Young, New York State Assemblyman and a justice of the New York Supreme Court, class of 1882
- Emma Willits, physician and surgeon, class of 1889
- Pliny Earle Goddard, linguist and director of the American Museum of Natural History in New York, post-graduate class of 1890
- Lee Miller, photographer and journalist, attended 1921–1923
- William E. Simkin, labor mediator and head of the Federal Mediation and Conciliation Service, class of 1923
- John Miller, aviator and oldest active pilot, class of 1924
- David Myers, cinematographer, attended lower school, 1920–1925
- Robert Yarnall Richie, photographer and filmmaker, class of 1926
- Rembert W. Patrick, historian and professor, class of 1926
- Clark V. Poling, Protestant chaplain and one of the Four Chaplains on troop transport Dorchester, class of 1929
- Don Haggerty, actor, attended 1927–1930
- Vincent Cochrane, mycologist and professor of biology at Wesleyan University, class of 1932
- Oliver Smith, set designer, attended 1932–1933
- Calvin D. MacCracken, inventor, class of 1936, son of Vassar president Henry N. MacCracken
- Mary Grace Canfield, actress, attended 1938–1939
- Lee Marvin, actor, attended 1938–39
- Chan Berg Parker, author, wife of jazz musician Charlie Parker and later Phil Woods, attended 1940–41
- Thomas R. Kane, WWII combat photographer, aerospace professor at University of Pennsylvania & Stanford University, class of 1941
- Thomas Rockwell, author, son of artist Norman Rockwell, attended with his brother Jerry, 1947–1949
- Thomas Dent, poet and author, class of 1948
- Timothy Wohlforth, social activist and writer, attended 1946–1950
- Mary McHenry, English professor at Mount Holyoke College, class of 1950
- Henry Brecher, researcher, class of 1951
- Mark Strand, poet, class of 1952
- Constance Porter Uzelac, class of 1956
- Jonathan Talbot, artist, class of 1957
- Steven Vogel, biomechanics researcher and former professor at Duke University, class of 1957
- Hugo F. Sonnenschein, economist and former president at University of Chicago, class of 1957
- Alfred Hiltebeitel, professor at George Washington University, class of 1959
- Kenneth Spaulding, politician and former attorney, class of 1963
- Patsy Norvell, artist, class of 1960
- Bonnie Raitt, singer-songwriter, class of 1967
- Juan Williams, journalist, class of 1972
- Montgomery Blair Sibley, former attorney, author, and legal consultant, class of 1974
- Annie Finch, poet and author, class of 1974
- Garrett Uhlenbrock, punk rock musician, attended 1979–1980
- Keith Bunin, playwright, class of 1989
- Dara Greenwald, artist & activist, class of 1989
- Mark Holub, jazz drummer, composer, bandleader and founder of Led Bib, class of 1999
- Anna Rose Farrell Holmer, independent film director and writer, class of 2003
- Sung Zu'er, Chinese actress, class of 2017

== Notable faculty members ==
- James Mott, anti-slavery activist, taught 1808–1811
- Lucretia Coffin Mott, abolitionist, taught 1809-1811
- Abigail Mott Moore, abolitionist, taught 1811-1812
- Lindley Murray Moore, educator, abolitionist and principal at Haverford College, taught 1808–1812
- Goold Brown, grammarian, taught 1811–1813
- William J. Beal, teacher of natural sciences, botanist, professor of botany at Michigan Agricultural College, taught 1858–1861
- Hannah Johnston Bailey, educator, pacifist, suffragette, taught 1867-1868
- George Aaron Barton, author and clergyman, class of 1879, taught 1882–1885
- Frank L. Young, New York State Assemblyman and a justice of the Supreme Court, class of 1882, taught 1886–1887
- Rufus Jones, writer, philosopher, and social reformer, taught 1886–1887
- Jonathan Clark Rogers, president of the University of Georgia 1949–1950, taught 1907–1911
- Evelyn Edson, author & medievalist, taught world history and social studies 1962–1964
- Ted Browne, football coach, director of boys' athletics 1965-1969
- Jerilynn Prior, endocrinologist, school physician and taught biology 1972–1973

== Heads of school ==
- Tripp & Mary Mosher, 1796
- Consider Merritt
- Alexander and Phebe Brown, 1801–1802
- Isaac and Ruth Hallock, 1802–1803
- James Mott, 1806-1807
- James Mott & Lydia Mott, 1807-1808
- Adam & Lydia Mott, 1811-1814
- Isaac & Anna Thorn, 1814-1816
- David & Sarah Seaman, 1816-1818
- Thomas & Phebe Willis, 1818-1820
- Reuben & Phebe Howes, 1820-1821
- Philip & Phebe Hoag, 1821-1824
- Daniel & Mary Lawson, 1824-1826
- Asa & Hannah Upton, 1826-1829
- Charles & Betsey Hoag, 1829-1830
- Philip & Phebe Hoag, 1830-1832
- Joseph D. & Mrs. Hoag, 1832-1833
- Benjamin and Mary Griffin, 1833–1842
- Mary Griffin, 1842
- Jarvis and Lydia Congdon, 1842–1849
- Abraham & Phebe Wanzer, 1849-1851
- Jarvis & Lydia Congdon, 1851-1853
- Ezra and Jane Willets, 1858–1862
- Egbert and Martha Carey, 1862–1864
- Franklin S. Hall, 1864–1865
- Henry K. Pinkham, 1865–1866
- George M. Sisson, 1867–1868
- Jacob H. Vining, 1868–1869
- Elijah Cook, Jr., 1869–1883
- Irana L. Pope, 1883-1886
- Elijah Cook, Jr., 1886-1889
- Charles H. Jones, 1889–1894
- Isaac Sutton, 1894–1895
- Elijah Cook, 1895–1897
- Irana L. Pope, 1897-1898
- Jonathan Dickinson, 1898–1899
- Leslie Bailey, 1899-1900
- T. Herbert Chase, 1900–1901
- Francis N. Maxfield, 1901–1903
- Samuel H. Hodgin, 1903–1905
- Walter Hallock Wood, 1905–1914
- Eliezer Partington, 1914-1916
- William J. Reagan, 1916–1948
- Joseph B. Shane, 1948–1950
- William W. Clark, 1950–1956
- Charles W. Hutton, 1956–1962
- Thomas Purdy, 1962–1968
- John D. Streetz, 1968 (interim)
- John D. Jennings, 1968–1973
- David L. Bourns, 1973–1979
- Theodore Lehmann, II, 1979–1980
- Clark McKercher Simms, 1980–1988
- Robert R. Coombs Jr., 1988–1991
- Stephen Waters, 1991–1992
- Lila A. Gordon, 1992–2000
- Peter F. Baily, 2000–2015
- Charles Cianfrani Jr., 2015–
