= Thomas L. Caldwell =

American sports coach, athletics administrator (1917–1997)

Biographical details
- Died: May 18, 1993

Coaching career (HC unless noted)

Football
- 1950–1951: Morris Brown (line)
- 1952–1960: Elizabeth City State (line)
- 1961–1976: Elizabeth City State

Basketball
- 1950–1952: Morris Brown (assistant)

Baseball
- 1952–1961: Elizabeth City State

Golf
- 1955–1961: Elizabeth City State

Administrative career (AD unless noted)
- 1979–1990: Elizabeth City State (associate AD)
- 1990–1991: Elizabeth City State (associate AD)

Head coaching record
- Overall: 77–62–4 (football)

Accomplishments and honors

Championships
- Football; 1 CIAA (1971); 1 CIAA Northern Division (1971)

Thomas L. "Tricky Tom" Caldwell (? – May 18, 1993) was an American football, basketball, baseball, and golf coach and college athletics administrator. He served as the head football coach at Elizabeth City State College—now known as Elizabeth City State University—in Elizabeth City, North Carolina from 1961 to 1976, compiling a record of 77–62–4.

A native of Carrollton, Georgia, Caldwell graduated from Tillotson College—which later merged into Huston–Tillotson University—and earned a master's degree from Indiana University Bloomington. He coached football and baseball at Tillotson before moving to Morris Brown College in Atlanta, where he was line coach for the football team and assistant basketball coach. He joined the coaching staff at Elizabeth City State in 1952. He was line coach for the football team and dean of men at Elizabeth City State for nine years before succeeding Ted Browne as head football coach in 1961.

At Elizabeth City State, Caldwell was also head baseball coach from 1952 to 1961 and head golf coach from 1955 to 1961. He was the school's associate athletic director from 1979 to 1990 and athletic director from 1990 to 1991. Caldwell died of a heart attack, on May 18, 1993.

== Head coaching record ==
=== Football ===
Year	Team	Overall	Conference	Standing	Bowl/playoffs
Elizabeth City State Pirates/Vikings (Central Intercollegiate Athletic Association) (1961–1976)
1961	Elizabeth City State	4–4	3–4	11th	
1962	Elizabeth City State	2–3–3	2–3–3	7th	
1963	Elizabeth City State	3–5	3–5	12th	
1964	Elizabeth City State	4–4	4–4	9th	
1965	Elizabeth City State	3–5	3–5	15th	
1966	Elizabeth City State	5–3	5–3	6th	
1967	Elizabeth City State	7–2	6–2	6th	
1968	Elizabeth City State	8–1	7–1	4th	
1969	Elizabeth City State	8–1	8–1	3rd	
1970	Elizabeth City State	6–3	4–1	2nd (Southern)	
1971	Elizabeth City State	7–3	7–2	1st (Northern)	
1972	Elizabeth City State	5–5	3–2	T–2nd (Northern)	
1973	Elizabeth City State	4–5–1	4–4–1	T–6th	
1974	Elizabeth City State	3–7	3–5	T–6th	
1975	Elizabeth City State	5–4	5–3	T–4th	
1976	Elizabeth City State	3–7	3–5	T–7th	
Elizabeth City State:		77–62–4	70–50–4		
Total:		77–62–4			
National championship Conference title Conference division title or championship game berth
