= Jane Slocum =

American educator

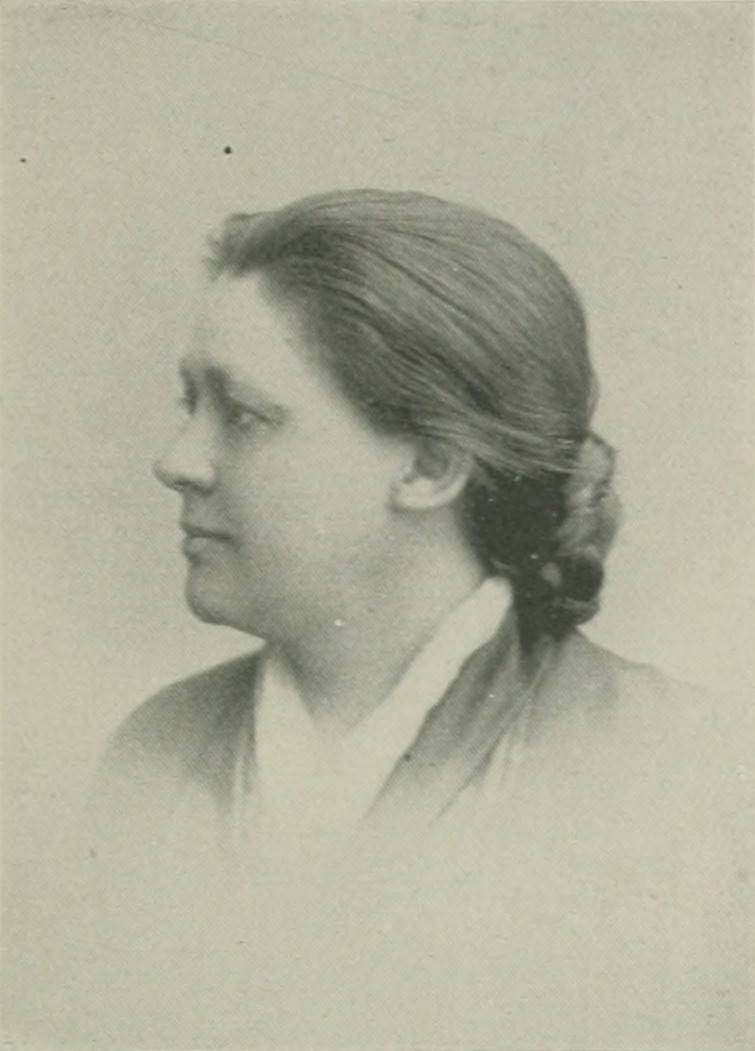
- Portrait from A Woman of the Century
- Born: May 1, 1842; Slocumville, Jefferson County, New York, U.S.
- Died: August 10, 1924 (aged 82); Weiser, Idaho, U.S.
- Occupations: educator; lecturer

Jane Slocum (1842–1924) was an American educator and lecturer. She taught in the Freedman School, Yorktown, Virginia, during the last year of the Civil War (1865), then in Howland Institute, Union Springs, New York (except 1871–72) till 1876. In 1876, she was one of four who founded Granger Place School at Canandaigua, New York, and conducted it 17 years. She went to New York City in 1893, where she gave parlor talks and had classes in social science in Carnegie Hall. Slocum was interested in civics, economics and the general welfare of the people, as well as bettering social conditions. She was a co-founder of the Idaho Industrial Institute, 1900, and served as principal of its girls' department before becoming a trustee, vice-president, and chair of its Educational Committee.

== Early life and education ==
Jane M. (Note: According to Willard & Livermore (1893), Jane's middle name was Mariah, while according to Slocum (1908) and the University of Michigan (1925), Jane's middle name was Maria. Her obituary in the Idaho Statesman refers to her as Maria E. Slocum.) Slocum was born in Slocumville, Jefferson County, New York, May 1, 1842. Her paternal ancestor, Giles Slocum, came from Somersetshire, England, in 1642. Giles Slocum was a Friend, as were all his descendants in direct line until Jane M. joined the Congregational Church in Canandaigua, New York. Her grandfather, Hon. Caleb Slocum, moved from Dartmouth, Massachusetts to the town of Le Ray, Jefferson County, New York, when her father, Samuel Gilford Slocum, was a small boy. The French gentleman who purchased and named the town after himself lived in luxuriant style in a country seat which he established, and as her grandfather became his private secretary, the young Quaker boy grew up in an atmosphere which served to broaden his horizon and to educate him. Making use of such opportunities as he had, her father became a leading citizen in the new community. He was married to a young Friend, Phebe Palmer, and reared his six children in his own faith. He supported a small school for the children of the hamlet, and there, in Slocumville, Jane began her education at the age of two-and-one-half years.

Slocum learned to read without difficulty and developed an omnivorous taste for books. First, she attended the public school within 1 mile (1.6 km) of her home; a woman taught in the summer and a man in the winter. At the age of fifteen, she was permitted to go to Miss Shepherd's small boarding school at Quaker Springs, New York. The following year, she went to the new Friends Boarding School (Oakwood Seminary) in Union Springs, New York, and graduated in 1861. She continued her studies in the Howland Collegiate Institute, in Union Springs, for a year. As the Civil War broke out, she was turned from her purpose of entering Oberlin College or Antioch College, the only higher institutions of learning then open to women. She was yet too young to be allowed to go to the war front, and she continued her studies in a collegiate institute.

== Career ==
Before the close of the war, her zeal to take some active part in the conflict led her to join the first volunteers for teaching the Freedmen. She received an appointment to teach in Yorktown, Virginia. A little school building was erected on Darlington Heights, Virginia, on York River, and there she devoted eight months of labor to the new race problem. A severe attack of malarial fever made a return to that field impracticable. One school year was given to the teaching of a private school in Philadelphia, New York, and the summer was devoted to the study of bookkeeping in the commercial college in Rochester, New York. An imperative call to Howland School, Union Springs, New York, resulted in further association with old teachers, and for ten years, she continued to labor there, building up the first department for girls in civil government and political economy.

In 1873, after being made principal, she took a leave of absence for two terms of the year, to pursue a law course in the University of Michigan, for the triple purpose of gaining more discipline by study, of acquiring a better foundation for political science, and to study the effects of co-education in college. In 1874, she took the degree of LL. B.

In 1878, Canandaigua, New York, Caroline Comstock, Harriet Hasbrouck, Charlotte P. Crocker, and Slocum established Granger Place School. Slocum was chosen vice-president. Her departments of instruction included civil government, political and social economy, psychology, logic and ethics.

She went to New York City to study social conditions and there taught by class lectures on civics and economics in schools, colleges, parlors, and halls, working meantime with Wilson L. Gilb as instructor in the Patriotic League, and becoming familiar with his idea of 'The School City' which was helpful in her later work in Watertown, New York, and elsewhere. She gave a course of University Extension lectures at Oak Island Beach.

In 1896, Slocum made her second trip to Europe and, on her return in the fall, accepted a call to teach in the Weiser Academy of Weiser, Idaho. She and her lifelong friend, Miss Mary Post, one of the first trained domestic science teachers in the country, gave up their new school and came to Weiser where in one small building, they established the Weiser Academy, Miss Slocum having charge of the girls' department. Here she remained two years, then again traveled in Europe.

Upon her return, she helped the Rev. Mr. E. A. Paddock start the Idaho Industrial Institute and became the girls' principal. Located 2 miles (3.2 km) north of Weiser, Idaho, this school focused on providing an education to young men and women living in country districts where there were no schools, or where school was in session only a few months in the year. The pupils had to be fifteen years old and pay for their schooling by manual work of some kind. She assumed charge of the women's department of this institute in the year 1900, and subsequently devoted her time and energy to its upbuilding. Slocum taught civics and economics in the third year of each course. When Idaho State Industrial School Women's Dormitory was established at St. Anthony, Idaho, the institute's name became confused with the state school, and was changed to the Intermountain Institute. For about 20 years she was the presiding head of it.

== Personal life ==
Slocum was a birthright member of Friends, or Quakers. Being separated from meetings of The Society of Friends, she joined the Congregational Church.

She favored woman suffrage. In politics, she was an Independent. Slocum was an Honorary member of the Weiser, Idaho Outlook Club, as well as a member of the American Academy of Political and Social Science, American Economics Association, and the University Extension Association.

Slocum's former pupils, principally of Howland Institute and Granger Place School, endowed her with a birthday gift of US$1,200 which, with gift of plan and specifications from her brother Samuel Gifford Slocum, architect in New York City, materialized in a bungalow, a home, named "Friendship lodge", for her old age among the Industrial Institute buildings in Weiser. About this time, Slocum's eyesight began to fail and for the last 10 years of her life, she had been unable to distinguish objects.

== Death ==
Jane Slocum died at Weiser, Idaho, August 10, 1924, aged 82.
