= Ken Reaves =

American football player (born 1944)

No. 36, 21
- Positions: Cornerback, safety

Personal information
- Born: October 29, 1944 (age 82); Braddock, Pennsylvania, U.S.
- Listed height: 6 ft 3 in (1.91 m)
- Listed weight: 210 lb (95 kg)

Career information
- High school: Braddock
- College: Norfolk State (1962–1965)
- NFL draft: 1966: 4th round, 49th overall pick

Career history
- Atlanta Falcons (1966–1973); St. Louis Cardinals (1974); New Orleans Saints (1974); St. Louis Cardinals (1975–1977)

Awards and highlights
- Pro Bowl (1969)

Career NFL statistics
- Interceptions: 37
- Interception yards: 558
- Fumble recoveries: 9
- Defensive touchdowns: 1
- Stats at Pro Football Reference

Kenneth Milton Reaves (born October 29, 1944) is an American former professional football player who was a cornerback and safety for 12 seasons in the National Football League (NFL) for the Atlanta Falcons, New Orleans Saints, and the St. Louis Cardinals. Reaves was selected to play in the 1970 Pro Bowl for his performance during the 1969 NFL season. He played college football for the Norfolk State Spartans.

== Early life ==
Reaves was born on October 29, 1944, in Braddock, Pennsylvania. Reaves attended Braddock High School, where he played quarterback on the school's football team. In his junior year (1960), he started his first game as the team's quarterback shortly before his 16th birthday. In that game, he ran for two touchdowns and passed for another. As a senior in 1961, he was 6 ft 1 in (1.85 m) 155 lb (70.3 kg), still playing as the team's quarterback.

== College career ==
Reaves attended Norfolk State University, which at the time was the Norfolk Division of Virginia State College (later Virginia State University). He was a two-way player on the football team under coach Bill Archie. In his freshman season (1962), Reaves played quarterback on the football team, which was part of the Central Intercollegiate Athletic Association (CIAA). In 1962, he had 589 yards passing and six passing touchdowns, on 37 completions in 99 passing attempts. The team was 5–3 on the season. He shared quarterbacking duties with Gene Lambert during his career at Norfolk State.

In 1963, the 180 lb (81.6 kg) Reaves continued as a quarterback for Norfolk State. The team was 4–4 during the season, and was selected to play in the 21st annual Capital Classic, in Washington, D.C. The game was played on November 30, one week later than planned because of President John F. Kennedy's assassination on November 22. In a 1964 game against the Hampton Institute, as a two-way player, he had a fumble recovery and five-yard tackle for loss on defense, and threw an interception as a quarterback. In 1965, Lambert was the leading passer on the team, and Reaves one of the team's best defenders, playing linebacker.

== Professional career ==
=== Atlanta Falcons ===
The Atlanta Falcons selected Reaves with the first pick in the fourth round of the 1966 NFL draft, 49th overall. Atlanta selected Reaves to be a defensive back. This was the Falcons' first NFL draft (held in late November 1965), as the NFL awarded Atlanta a franchise in June 1965, becoming the 15th NFL team. As a rookie in 1966, Reaves was a reserve defensive back, with one interception. He returned four kickoffs and one punt that season. He was in on only 136 defensive plays that season.

In 1967, the 6 ft 3 in (1.91 m) 205 lb (93 kg) Reaves started all 14 games for the Falcons at left cornerback. He had a career-high seven interceptions, and was considered an excellent tackler on defense. He had two interceptions against Don Meredith in the season's eighth game, a 37–7 loss to the Dallas Cowboys. He returned one of the interceptions 71 yards.

Through eight games that season, Reaves had six interceptions, second best in the NFL; but Falcons' head coach Norb Hecker anticipated Reaves would have less interceptions going forward as opposing quarterbacks would choose to throw less in Reaves's direction. As anticipated Reaves only had one more interception that season, two weeks later against Roman Gabriel and the Los Angeles Rams. Reaves finished the NFL season tied for sixth best in interceptions.

In 1968, Reaves again started all 14 Falcons’ games at left cornerback. He had one interception, which he returned 90 yards for a touchdown. This was once again against Roman Gabriel, in a loss to the Rams on October 20. The following season (1969) he was selected to the Pro Bowl for the first and only time in his career. Reaves again started all 14 games at left cornerback, with three interceptions and a fumble recovery. The Falcons' 6–8 record that season was their best to date, never having won more than three games in a season before then.

In 1970, Reaves started 13 games for the Falcons, with six interceptions and one fumble recovery. He tied for ninth in the NFL in most interceptions that season. He had six interceptions again in 1971, starting all 14 Falcons' games at left cornerback; again tying for ninth best in the NFL. The Falcons had the first winning season in franchise history, going 7–6–1. He had two interceptions against Archie Manning in an October 1971 game against the New Orleans Saints.

The Falcons had a heated rivalry with the Saints that began with the Saints joining the NFL in 1967, and Reaves had a years' long feud with Saints' wide receiver Dan Abramowicz. New Orleans' fans hated Reaves, who they considered the beloved Abramowicz's nemesis. Abramowicz called Reaves a great cornerback, but early in their rivalry said he had no respect for Reaves and considered him a dirty player (Reeves responding Abramowicz was a "crybaby"). Abramowicz believed Reaves hit him unfairly during games, but Reaves believed they traded blows equally during their games against each other. Reaves said Abramowicz had once almost put Reaves’ eye out (though reported as grinning when he said this). Later in their careers, Abramowicz said he respected Reaves.

The Falcons-Saints games were highly aggressive and physical; sometimes marked by fights between players. In an October 1970 game, Reaves and Saints' offensive tackle Don Talbert were ejected after tussling during an interception return. Reaves did not understand the basis for the ejection since neither player threw a punch. On another occasion, he recalled having a fight with Talbert that amounted to very little, saying "No football fight ever does [amount to much] with all the equipment your wear".

Reeves started all 14 Falcons' games at left cornerback in 1972, with three interceptions and a fumble recovery. In his final season with the Falcons (1973), the team finished with a 9–5 record. Reeves again started all 14 games at left cornerback, with two interceptions. During his eight year career with the Falcons (1966 to 1973), he started 97 games with 29 interceptions.

=== Trade controversy ===
Reaves was the Falcons' player representative to the National Football League Players Association (NFLPA) in 1974. Among other things, he led a picket line of striking Falcons' players during the preseason in July 1974. On the first day of picketing in July, he was on the picket line for less than an hour when Falcons coach Norm Van Brocklin asked to meet with Reaves and told Reaves he had been traded to the Saints. He was traded along with Falcons' guard Andy Maurer, who had requested that the Falcons trade him. The Falcons received guard Royce Smith and linebacker Dick Palmer. Even after being traded, Reaves stayed on the Falcons' picket line for the duration of the players' strike in 1974, as the Saints had their own player representative.

Van Brocklin recognized the timing of the trade made for a bad appearance on the Falcons' side, but he denied that the Falcons traded Reaves because Reaves was the player representative or were anti-labor. Rather, Van Brocklin said at the time, the trade had been under consideration for months, and the Saints insisted Reaves be included in the trade. The following summer, as part of a claim brought before the National Labor Relations Board that the Falcons had traded him solely because of his union activities, Reaves testified and gave examples of animosity by the team owner and Van Brocklin toward Reaves based on his player representative status. In 1976, an administrative law judge ruled that Reaves trade to the Saints had not violated the law.

=== New Orleans Saints and St. Louis Cardinals ===
Reaves started five games for the Saints in 1974, and was traded during the season to the St. Louis Cardinals for a draft choice. In 1973, Abramowicz had asked the Saints to trade him, and they sent him to the San Francisco 49ers early in the 1973 season. One of the five games Reaves played for the Saints in 1974 was against Abramowicz and the 49ers, the season's opening game.

Before that game, Abramowicz said "I expect I'll be seeing a lot of Ken Sunday. He's a great player, and I respect him quite a bit. I'm sure when it's all over, I'll respect him and he'll respect me". In the game, Reaves led the Saints with six solo tackles and also had three assisted tackles. Abramowicz caught one pass for six yards, keeping his consecutive game reception streak alive at 92 games. In an unusual play, Reaves made an extraordinary effort to prevent 49ers quarterback Joe Reed from crashing into a fence and possibly suffering injury, but was called for an unnecessary roughness penalty in doing so, in an obvious officiating error.

Reaves had played in 117 consecutive games at the time he joined the Cardinals in October 1974. Reaves started all six of his games for the Cardinals at strong safety in 1974, and had one interception that he returned 54 yards. His first game as a Cardinals' starter came during the seventh game of the season, on October 27, against the Washington Redskins. After starting six games, Reaves did not play in the last game of the season because of an injured ankle. The Cardinals finished the 1974 season, 10–4, and for the first time in his career Reaves was on a playoff team. The Cardinals lost to the Minnesota Vikings in the divisional round of the NFC playoffs, 30–14. Still suffering the effects of the ankle injury, Reaves did not start in the game.

Over the next three seasons (1975 to 1977), Reaves started 41 of 42 games in which he appeared for the Cardinals, playing strong safety. He served an important communication and intermediary role between the team and its black players. In 1975, he started 13 games for the Cardinals at strong safety, with three interceptions and two fumble recoveries. The Cardinals were 11–3, finishing in first place in the NFC East Division. They lost to the Los Angeles Rams in the NFC divisional playoff round, 35–23; with Reaves the Cardinals' starter at strong safety.

In 1976, the Cardinals were 10–4, but finished third in the NFC East Division and missed the playoffs. Reaves had two interceptions that season. In 1977, he started every Cardinals' game at strong safety, and had two interceptions. Reaves had a muscle tear in his chest during the last three games of the 1977 season, and was only able to play because of pain killing medication injections. After the season ended, Reaves went to see general manager Larry Wilson about his contract for the 1978 season, but was told the Cardinals did not have an interest in his continuing to play for the team. He later signed a two-year contract with the San Diego Chargers in early July 1978, but the Chargers released him in August.

In 3½ seasons with the Cardinals, Reaves started 47 games and had eight interceptions. Over his NFL career, he started 149 of the 165 games in which he played, with 37 interceptions.

== Legacy ==
Reaves played in 112 consecutive games for the Falcons, and was a team captain with the Falcons. He is fifth all-time among Falcons’ leaders in interceptions. He was a low-profile player in terms of fan awareness, and appreciation by the football media; but among opposing players he was recognized for his abilities. He was known as a hard-hitting player who intimated opposing receivers, and was skilled at hitting receivers hard just as the pass arrived.

Reaves described some of the skills and tactics he used as a defensive back. "I have this theory that if I can make a receiver aware of something other than catching the ball, I do it. I am bigger (6–3, 205) than most receivers so I figure I ought to use that advantage". In his experience, he found "Some receivers can be intimidated . . . and muscle isn't the only weapon you use. If through talk and threats I can break a receiver's concentration, then I have an advantage". Reaves found that there were receivers like Charley Taylor and Otis Taylor who would use similar tactics to intimidate defensive backs.

Reaves believed the bump and run tactics used by defensive backs in the American Football League in the late 1960s were obsolete by 1973, with zone defenses and double coverages becoming more prominent at that time. He also observed that young quarterbacks would give away where they would be throwing the ball with the direction of their look while preparing to pass, and that it took three to five years for a quarterback to learn how to play well in the NFL including how to deceive defensive backs.

During the 1974 players strike, Reaves was the first player representative waived or traded by an NFL team. It has been stated that he later won a labor discrimination suit against the NFL, along with NFLPA president Bill Curry and vice presidents Kermit Alexander and Tom Keating, for being waived or traded because of their union activities. However, it was also been reported at the time that while Curry, Alexander and Keating were successful in their claims before the National Labor Relations Board, the administrative law judge deciding the matter found Reaves was not traded to the Saints in violation of the law.

Reaves had a sense of there being some risk in being a player representative, but did not appreciate the reality of it until the strike. He stated that the team even called his wife Jo Ann, and told her that Reaves needed to stop striking and rejoin the team. When he questioned himself about the wisdom of being a player representative, she told him he was doing the right thing in standing up for the players' demands; though he found many players were not very supportive of the strike. When Reaves went to the Cardinals later in 1974, Reaves said coach Don Coryell considered Reaves a militant, but told Reaves he would overlook that since he liked the way Reaves played.
