= Ted Browne =

American sports coach, athletics administrator (c. 1914 – 2002)

Biographical details
- Born: c. 1914
- Died: February 2, 2002

Playing career

Football
- 1936–1939: Wilberforce

Basketball
- c. 1936–1940: Wilberforce

Track and field
- c. 1936–1940: Wilberforce
- Position: Quarterback (football)

Coaching career (HC unless noted)

Football
- 1947: Edward Waters
- 1949–1951: Bethune–Cookman (backfield)
- 1952–1955: Claflin
- 1956–1958: Benedict
- 1959: Livingstone
- 1960: Elizabeth City State
- 1961: Norfolk State (backfield)
- 1965–1968: Oakwood Friends (NY)

Basketball
- 1961–1962: Norfolk State (assistant)
- 1965–1968: Oakwood Friends (NY)

Track and field
- 1965–1968: Oakwood Friends (NY)

Administrative career (AD unless noted)
- 1965–1968: Oakwood Friends (NY)

Accomplishments and honors

Championships
- 1 SEAC (1953)

Arthur W. "Ted" Browne (c. 1914 – February 2, 2002) was an American college football coach and athletics administrator. He served as the head football coach at Edward Waters College (now known as Edward Waters University) in Jacksonville, Florida for one season, in 1947, Claflin University in Orangeburg, South Carolina from 1952 to 1955, Benedict College in Columbia, South Carolina from 1956 to 1958, Livingstone College in Salisbury, North Carolina for one season, in 1959, and Elizabeth City State Teachers College (now known as Elizabeth City State University) in Elizabeth City, North Carolina for one season, in 1960.

A native of Woodbury, New Jersey, Browne attended Woodbury High School, where he competed in football, basketball, baseball, and track. He then moved on to Wilberforce University in Wilberforce, Ohio, where he lettered in football, basketball, and track before graduating in 1940. Browne also played for the Zulu Cannibal Giants, a Negro league baseball team in Louisville, Kentucky. He played football at Wilberforce as a quarterback.

Browne coached at his alma mater, Wilberforce, before he was hired as head football coach at Edward Waters in 1947. He served as backfield coach at Bethune–Cookman College (now known as Bethune–Cookman University) in Daytona Beach, Florida under head football coach Bunky Matthews prior to being hired as head football coach at Claflin in 1952. He was hired as the head football coach at Elizabeth City State in 1960, succeeding William B. Harris. After a season at Elizabeth City State, Browne went to Norfolk State College—now known as Norfolk State University—in Norfolk, Virginia to work as backfield coach under head football coach Bill Archie.

in 1965, Browne was appointed as the athletic director at the Oakwood Friends School in Poughkeepsie New York. He also coached football, basketball, and track and field at Oakwood until the school dropped football after the 1968 season. He later earned a master's degree from Columbia University, and worked as an administrator for the public school system in Dutchess County, New York. Browne died of heart failure, at the age of 87, on February 2, 2002.

== Head coaching record ==
=== College football ===
Year	Team	Overall	Conference	Standing	Bowl/playoffs
Edward Waters Tigers () (1947)
1947	Edward Waters				
Edward Waters:					
Claflin Panthers (Southeastern Athletic Conference) (1952–1955)
1952	Claflin	4–5	3–2	3rd	
1953	Claflin	6–3	5–0	1st	
1954	Claflin	6–3	4–1		
1955	Claflin	3–5	2–2		
Claflin:		19–16	14–5		
Benedict Tigers (Southern Intercollegiate Athletic Conference) (1956–1958)
1956	Benedict	4–3	2–3	T–11th	
1957	Benedict	4–4	2–4	10th	
1958	Benedict	5–5	3–3		
Benedict:		13–12	7–10		
Livingstone Blue Bears (Eastern Intercollegiate Athletic Conference) (1959)
1959	Livingstone	5–3–1	3–1–1	3rd	
Livingstone:		5–3–1	3–1–1		
Elizabeth City State Pirates (Central Intercollegiate Athletic Association) (1960)
1960	Elizabeth City State	1–8	1–7	16th	
Elizabeth City State:		1–8	1–7		
Total:					
National championship Conference title Conference division title or championship game berth
