= Eliza Maria Mosher =

American physician, educator, medical writer, inventor

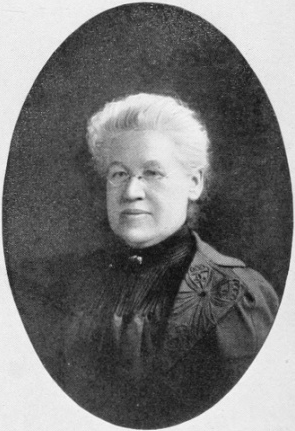
- Born: October 2, 1846; Cayuga County, New York, U.S.
- Died: October 16, 1928 (aged 82); Murray Hill, Manhattan, New York, U.S.
- Education: University of Michigan
- Occupations: Physician, inventor, medical writer
- Medical career
- Field: medicine
- Institutions: New England Hospital for Women and Children
- Research: Educational focus on physical fitness and health maintenance

Eliza Maria Mosher (October 2, 1846 – October 16, 1928) was a United States physician, inventor, medical writer, and educator whose wide-ranging medical career included an educational focus on physical fitness and health maintenance. She was the first Dean of Women at the University of Michigan, and the first woman professor to be recognized by the university.

== Early years and education ==
Eliza Maria Mosher was born near Cayuga Lake, New York in 1846. Her parents were members of the Society of Friends, and she was brought up under the influences of that religious denomination. Her paternal grandfather settled in Cayuga County, New York, and her maternal in Madison County, New York, when that portion of the state was yet a wilderness, and both became large land owners, and throughout their lives were men of influence in the localities in which they lived. Her mother was a woman notable for Christian character, for self-possession, and for ability to act in emergencies, and the daughter remembers more than once in her childhood having seen her mother sew up gaping wounds and apply bandages to injured parts without waiting for the doctor (who lived several miles away) to be brought. It is not strange that the daughter of such a woman should at an early age have manifested qualities which indicated her fitness to be a physician. Between the ages of twelve and twenty-two, eight deaths occurred in her immediate family, some of them preceded by long illnesses. It was these events, without doubt, that awakened the interest in the subject of pathology which eventually led her into her life-work. Her ancestors were from England and Wales, and of Mayflower stock.

Her preliminary education was received at the Friends' Academy in Union Springs, New York from which she graduated in 1862; and under private tutors.

Over the objections of friends and family, the study of medicine was begun by her in Boston, in 1869, as an intern apprentice under the direction of Dr. Lucy Ellen Sewall, at that time resident physician at the New England Hospital for Women and Children. After a year, she was forced to suspend her education to nurse her mother, who had breast cancer.

She entered the Medical Department of University of Michigan in 1871, arranging for herself a graded course which should require three years instead of the two usually taken. At the beginning of her second year, she was asked to serve as Assistant Demonstrator of Anatomy and Quiz Master for freshmen, which she did, giving up the year mainly to that work, and allowing herself a fourth year of study before graduation. The third year of her course was spent in New York City in clinical study and attendance upon lectures at Elizabeth Blackwell's Woman's Medical College of the New York Infirmary for Women and Children. She also worked two summers in the wards of the New England Hospital for Women and Children, serving as an undergraduate intern. She graduated at the University of Michigan in 1875, with an M.D.

== Career ==
After completing her education, she opened a practice in Poughkeepsie, New York where she became a member of the city and county medical societies.

Upon the opening of the Massachusetts Reformatory for Women in 1877, she was called to the position of resident physician, receiving her appointment from the governor of the state. There she fitted up and successfully conducted a hospital of ninety beds, with an additional nursery department of sixty beds. In 1879, she went to London, and studied at the University of Paris School of Medicine in Paris from 1879 to 1880, to pursue the study of special subjects. Upon her return to this country a year later, the Massachusetts Reformatory Prison was without a superintendent, and Governor Long induced her to take the position, “at least until another woman should be found who was fitted for the difficult place.” Reluctantly turning aside from the work of her choice, she devoted herself to the reorganization of the prison, which at that time had about 375 inmates, with a corps of about 40 employés. Her success as an organizer here was very marked, and her work left a lasting impress upon the discipline of the prison. She became so much interested in the development of its possibilities that she remained at its head nearly three years.

While crippled by a knee injury for seven years, she lectured on anatomy and hygiene at Wellesley College; and in 1884, she was appointed professor of physiology and resident physician to Vassar College, while starting up a general medical practice in Brooklyn, New York, from 1886 to 1896, in association with Dr. Lucy M. Hall, also a graduate of the University of Michigan. Together, Mosher and Hall held the chair of Physiology and the position of Resident Physician at Vassar College, doing the work there in alternate semesters, during the first three years of their professional life in Brooklyn. Mosher was lecturer at the Chautauqua Summer School of Physical Education beginning in 1888. She served as professor of hygiene in the department of literature, science and arts, and women's dean at the University of Michigan, holding this position until 1902, being the first Dean of Women at the University of Michigan, and the first woman professor to be recognized by the university.

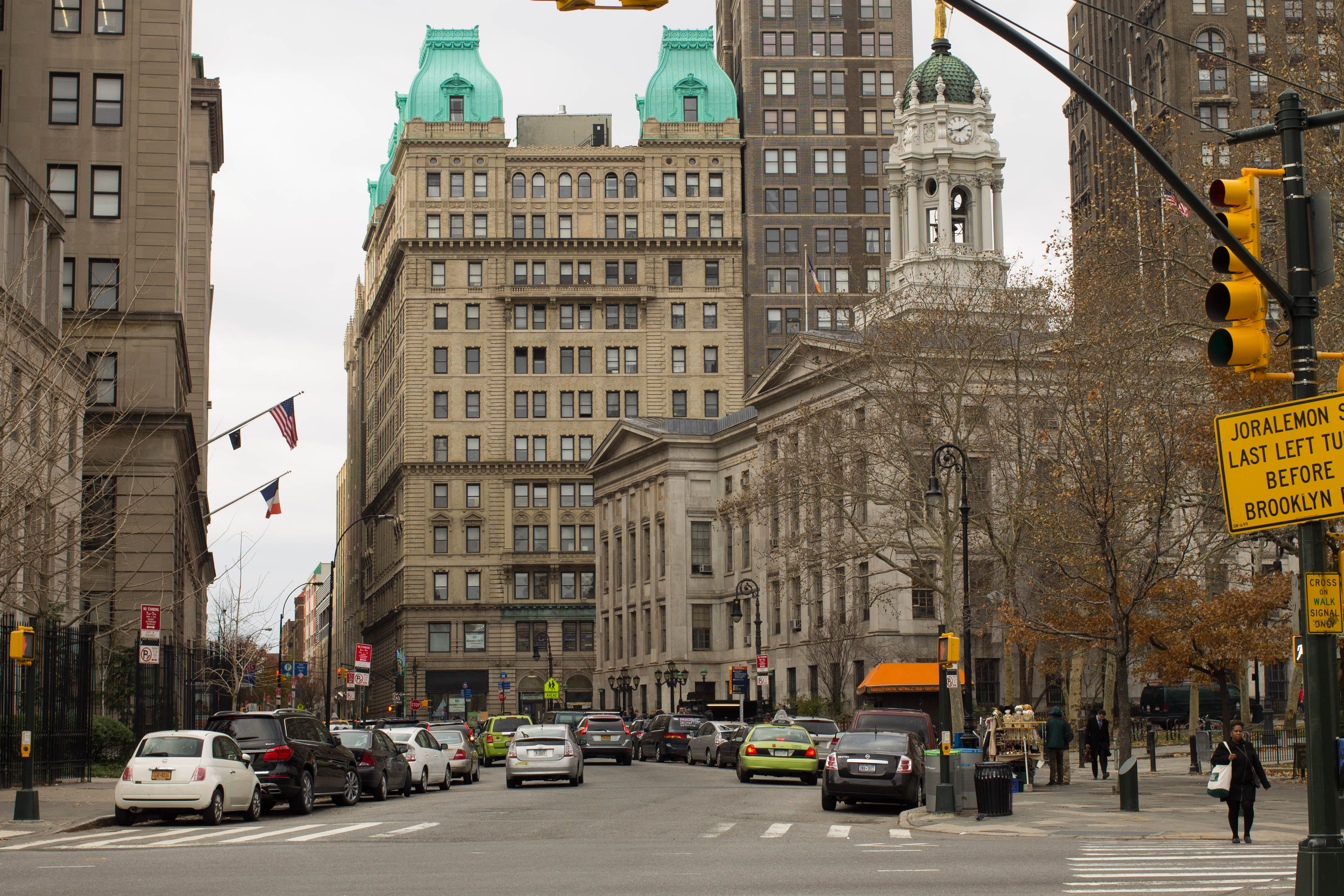
Temple Bar Building, Brooklyn

In 1902, she returned to her practice in Brooklyn, and opened offices in the Temple Bar Building. Mosher was a founder of the American Posture League. She studied posture and designed streetcar and kindergarten chairs. She was the inventor of a “Posture Model,” made by Messrs. Tieman & Co., and a “Pelvic Obliquimetre" made by the same firm. She served as attending physician of the Wayside Home for Homeless Women in Brooklyn, medical doctor to the Young Women's Christian Association, lecturer on home nursing and personal hygiene of Brooklyn Red Cross Instruction and District Nursing Society, and was a lecturer on physiology and hygiene of the Missionary Training Institute, in Brooklyn.

Mosher was a member of the Medical Society of the County of Kings; of the Brooklyn Pathological Society; the American Electro-Therapeutic Association; the American Public Health Association; and the American Association for the Advancement of Physical Education. She was one of the incorporators of the Chatauqua School of Physical Education of which she served as first vice-president and lecturer on anatomy.

She wrote the following papers: “The Health of Criminal Women,” American Social Science Association, Saratoga, 1882; “Prison Discipline,” American Association of Charities and Corrections, 1883; “A Critical Study of the Biceps Cruris Muscle and Its Relation to Diseases in and around the Knee Joint,” Annals of Surgery, November, 1891; “The Influence of Habits of Posture upon the Symmetry and Health of the Body,” Brooklyn Medical Journal, July, 1892; “Habitual Postures of School Children,” Educational Review, New York, October, 1892; “Habits of Posture a Cause of Deformity and Displacement of the Uterus,” Transactions of the Pan-American Medical Congress, September, 1893; and “The Importance of Maintaining the Pelvis in Normal Obliquity,” Transactions of the American Association for the Advancement of Physical Education, 1894. She also wrote Health and Happiness, 1911. For twenty years, Mosher served as senior editor of the Medical Women's Journal.

== Private life and legacy ==
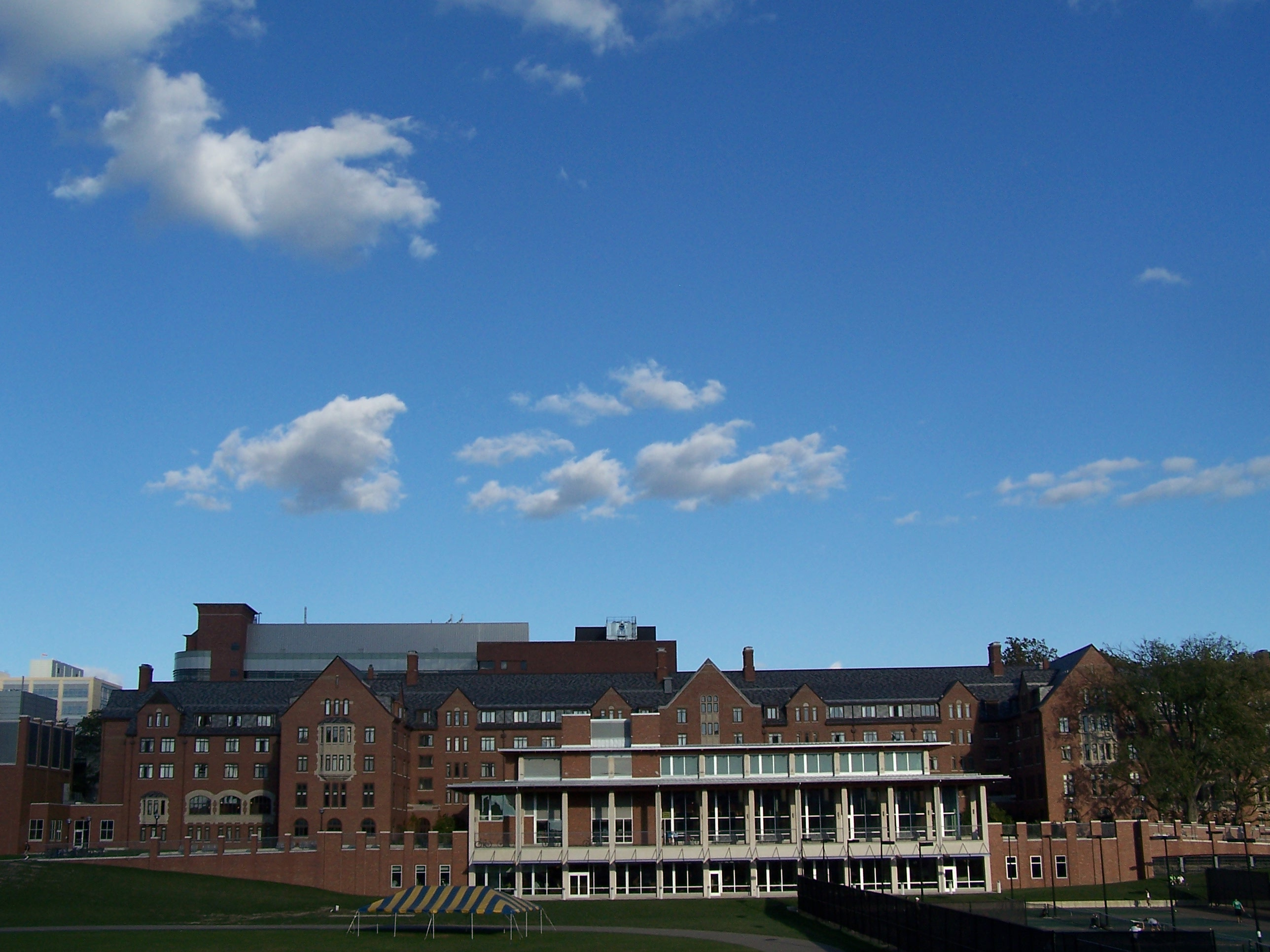
Mosher-Jordan residence hall

Mosher died at the Murray Hill Sanitarium, Manhattan, October 16, 1928, while convalescing from a fractured leg. Her portrait was presented to the University of Michigan in April 1941, by Mrs. John C. Percy. The Mosher-Jordan residence hall at the University of Michigan was constructed in 1931, in honor of Mosher and Myra B. Jordan, the university's first two women Deans.
