= Jessie H. Bancroft =

American educator

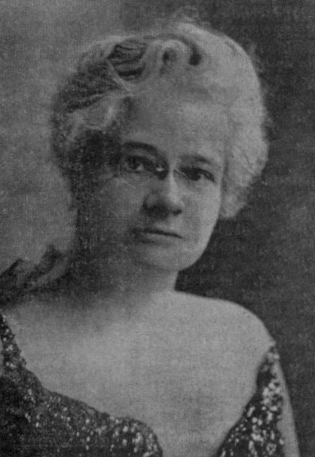
- Born: December 1867; Winona, Minnesota, US
- Died: November 13, 1952 (aged 84); Pittsfield, Massachusetts, US
- Education: Winona Normal School
- Occupation: Educator

Jessie Hubbell Bancroft (1867–1952) was an American educator, a pioneer of physical education and a founder and a president of the American Posture League.

== Biography ==
She was born in Winona, Minnesota in December 1867, and was exposed to the Delsarte System of Physical Culture while studying at Winona Normal School.

During 1893–1903 she was Director of Physical Training of the Brooklyn Schools and from 1904 until retirement in 1928 she was Assistant Director of Physical Education of the schools of Greater New York City.

She was an author of many professional publications on posture, including her insightful 1913 book, The Posture of School Children, as well as other literature on physical education.

In addition to founding of the APL, she was a founder of the American Association for the Advancement of Physical Education and the only woman to serve as its secretary (1902–1903).

She was the first living person to receive the Luther Halsey Gulick Award for advances in physical education (1924). She was the first woman elected to Fellow status in the National Academy of Kinesiology (formerly the American Academy of Physical Education), with a Fellow number of 8. She was also made a Fellow of the American Association for the Advancement of Science.

She died at Hillcrest Hospital in Pittsfield, Massachusetts on November 13, 1952.

== Books ==
- 1896 (reprinted 1903): School Gymnastics, Free Hand: A System of Physical Exercises for Schools
- 1900: School Gymnastics with Light Apparatus
  - 1915: Gimnasia escolar sin aparatos, Spanish translation
- 1909: Games for the Playground, Home, School and Gymnasium
  - 1942: Revised and expanded edition, Macmillan Company
- 1913: The Posture of School Children
- 1916: (with William Dean Pulvermacher) Handbook of Athletic Games: For Players, Instructors, and Spectators, Comprising Fifteen Major Ball Games, Track and Field Athletics and Rowing Races
