= Idaho State Industrial School Women's Dormitory =

- U.S. National Register of Historic Places
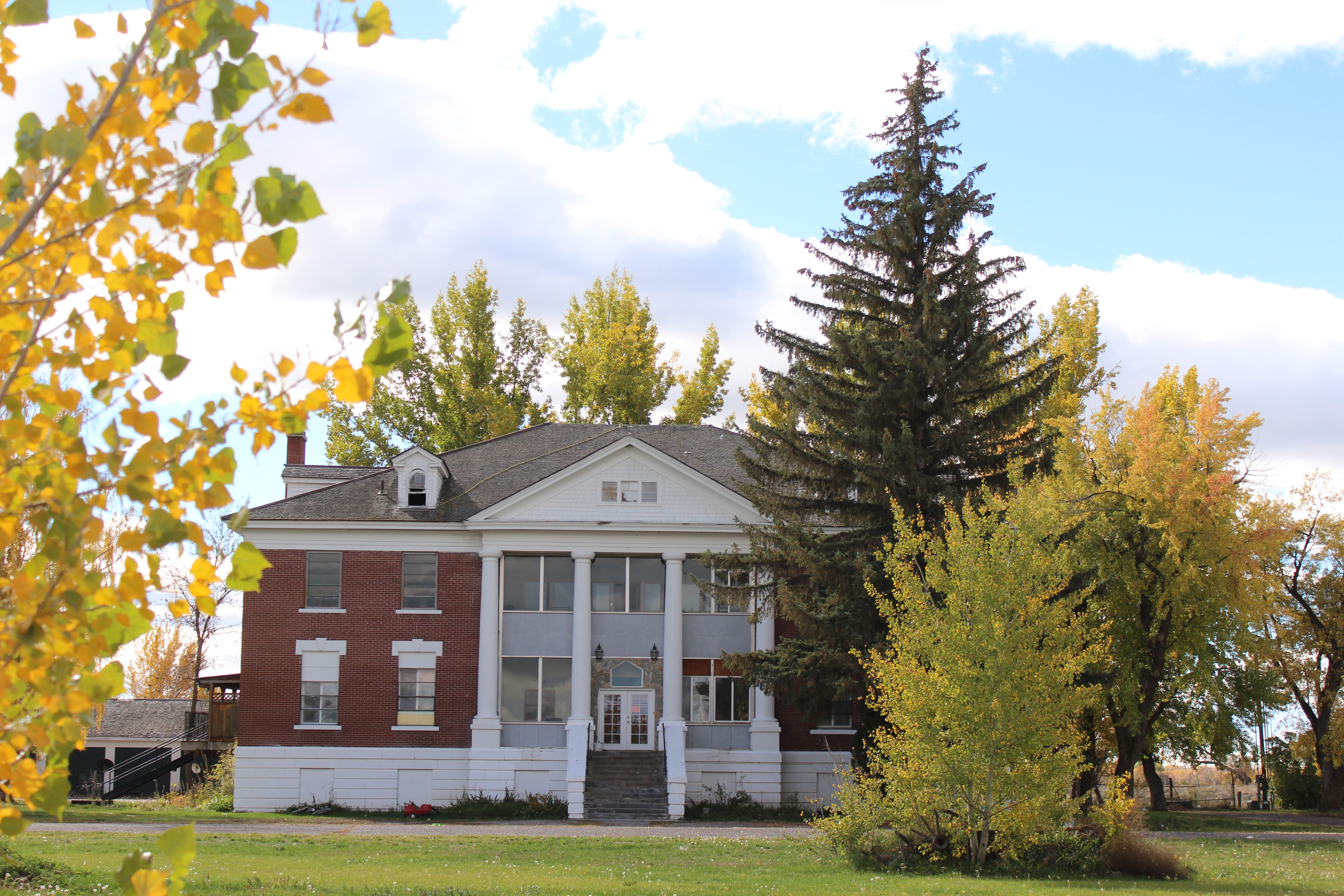

- Location within Idaho Location within the United States
- Location: 2266 E. 600 North, St. Anthony, Idaho
- Coordinates: 43°58′10″N 111°42′17.5″W
- Area: less than one acre
- Built: 1924
- Architect: Tourtellotte & Hummel
- Architectural style: Colonial Revival
- MPS: Tourtellotte and Hummel Architecture TR
- NRHP reference No.: 82000344
- Added to NRHP: November 17, 1982

The Idaho State Industrial School Women's Dormitory in St. Anthony, Idaho was completed in 1924 from 1920 plans designed by the architectural firm Tourtellotte & Hummel. It was listed on the National Register of Historic Places on November 17, 1982.

It is a two-story hip-roofed brick building on a full, concrete basement. It has a four-column, low-pedimented portico. It is about 63 by 83 feet (19 m × 25 m) in plan and was intended to house 25 girls.

== History ==
Founded in 1903, the Idaho State Industrial Reform School was home to the region's most wayward youth. Children were sent here, most against their will, to be reformed. The conditions were reportedly so bad that some of the 'inmates' chose to take their own lives. On the property, there are 22 unmarked graves of children who died under suspicious circumstances. Towards the end of the twentieth century, the former girl's dormitory and the infirmary building next door were decommissioned and eventually sold to various families who transformed them into their homes.

== In the media ==
=== Television ===
The Idaho State Industrial Reform School and Infirmary building were featured on an episode of Ghost Adventures in 2019. The team investigated reports from the current family who lives here of the ghost of girl named Hope Chacon, a 14-year-old Mexican girl who committed suicide by hanging herself in the dormitory building in 1941.
