= American Posture League =

The American Posture League of the United States was established and initially funded by educator Jessie H. Bancroft, Henry Ling Taylor, an orthopedic surgeon, and Dr. Eliza Mosher. The idea of the league was to combine scientific research with business: based on research in posture, they gave recommendations to businesses (manufacturers of footwear, furniture, etc.) and charging fees for contractual use the League labels. To the latter end, the Posture Standards Company was formed, to keep business separate from science, since the commercialization of science was one of the criticisms of the League. The enterprise was not a commercial success, but George J. Fisher (a former President of the League) notes that the founder trio were repaid all their investments, with the exception of the founding free gifts.
