= Intermountain Institute =

- U.S. National Register of Historic Places
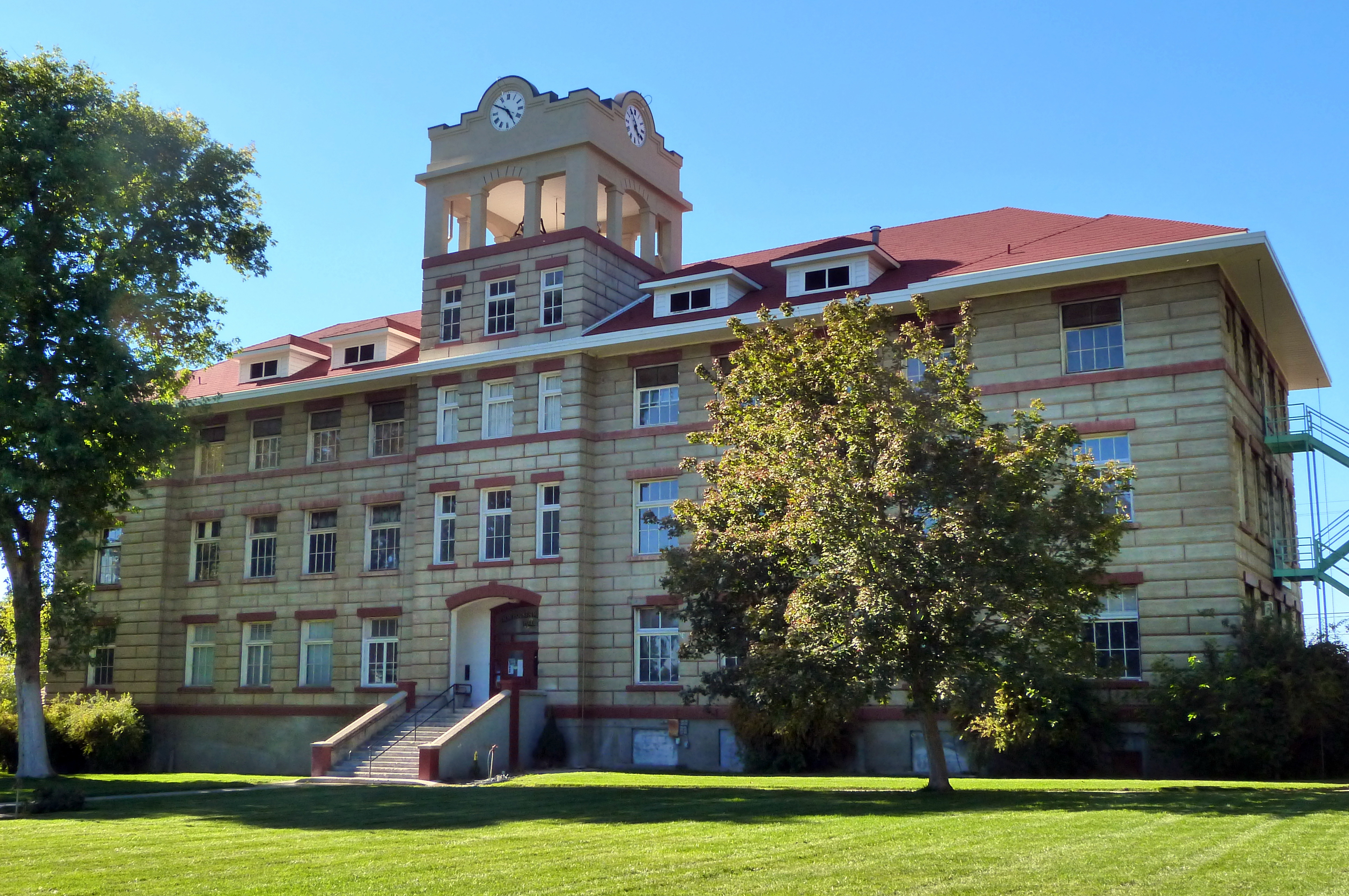
- Hooker Hall

- Location within Idaho Location within the United States
- Location: Paddock Ave., Weiser, Idaho
- Coordinates: 44°15′53″N 116°58′51″W
- Area: 15 acres (6.1 ha)
- Built: 1907
- Architect: Tourtellotte & Hummel
- Architectural style: Classical Revival
- NRHP reference No.: 79000811
- Added to NRHP: November 1, 1979

The Intermountain Institute in Weiser, Idaho, also known as the Idaho Industrial Institute, was an American school which included facilities for students boarding there. Built in 1907 on Paddock Avenue, its complex of buildings are unusual in being constructed of continuously cast concrete during a span of about 20 years.

The complex includes nine buildings and a structure which were deemed contributing in a National Register of Historic Places listing in 1979.

It includes the Billings Memorial Gymnasium (1929), which was designed by Boise architects Tourtellotte & Hummel in Classical Revival style. Slocum Hall, named after Jane Slocum, one of the school founders, was built in 1909 and used as the boys' dormitory. Hooker Hall is, architecturally, the "most pretentious" of the buildings; plans were afoot in 1979 for it to become home of something. In fact, in 2019, it is the home of the Snake River Heritage Center and/or the Weiser Museum.

Historic function: Education Historic subfunction: School; Educational Related Housing Criteria: architecture/engineering, person
