= Emma Willits =

American surgeon (1869–1965)

Emma K. Willits (20 September 1869 – 9 April 1965) was a physician and surgeon who played an important role in the development of Children's Hospital in San Francisco (now the California campus [Women and Children's Center] of the California Pacific Medical Center), serving as the head of the Department of General Surgery from 1921 to 1934. She is believed to be the third woman to specialize in surgery in the United States, and the first to head a surgery department.

== Biography ==
Willits was born in Macedon, New York and was educated at Quaker schools. In 1892 she moved to Chicago to enroll in the Women's Medical College of Chicago, then affiliated with (and later absorbed by) Northwestern University. After receiving her medical degree in 1896, she served her internship at the Women's Hospital of Chicago.

In 1897, Willits moved to San Francisco as a resident at the Children's Hospital (for Women and Children). When she completed her residency in 1900, she opened her own private practice but maintained her affiliation with Children's. She was initially a member of the surgical staff of the Department of Pediatrics, and later became chief of the Department of Surgical Diseases of Children. In 1921 she became the chair of the Department of General Surgery, a position she held until 1934 when she stepped down but continued to serve as a consulting physician and surgeon. She is believed to be the first woman in the United States to head a surgery department. Over the course of her career, she visited the Mayo Clinic several times and spent several months studying in Vienna in 1923. She also maintained a private practice as a family doctor, retiring in 1941.

Willits' house in Palo Alto, constructed in 1926–27, was designed by architect Lionel H. Pries.

== Personal life ==
Willits was lesbian and throughout her adult life lived with her partner, Elizabeth Ristine. She lived quietly in San Francisco until her death at age 95.
