= Bill Archie =

American football coach and college athletics administrator (1930–2022)

Biographical details
- Born: December 25, 1930; Welch, West Virginia, U.S.
- Died: March 19, 2022 (aged 91)

Playing career

Football
- 1951–1953: West Virginia State

Basketball
- c. 1950: West Virginia State
- Position: Quarterback (football)

Coaching career (HC unless noted)

Football
- 1961–1966: Norfolk State

Administrative career (AD unless noted)
- 1970–1984: Norfolk State

Head coaching record
- Overall: 21–25

William L. Archie (December 25, 1930 – March 19, 2022) was an American football coach and college athletics administrator. He served as the head football coach at Norfolk State University from 1961 to 1966, compiling a record of 21–25. Archie was also the athletic director at Norfolk State from 1970 to 1984.

A native of Welch, West Virginia, Archie attended West Virginia State University, where he played football and basketball.

Archie died on March 19, 2022, at the age of 91.

== Head coaching record ==
Year	Team	Overall	Conference	Standing	Bowl/playoffs
Norfolk State Spartans (Eastern Intercollegiate Athletic Conference) (1961)
1961	Norfolk State	3–4	0–1	NA	
Norfolk State Spartans (Central Intercollegiate Athletic Association) (1962–1966)
1962	Norfolk State	5–3	3–3	9th	
1963	Norfolk State	4–4	4–3	10h	
1964	Norfolk State	2–5	2–5	15th	
1965	Norfolk State	4–4	4–4	11th	
1966	Norfolk State	3–5	3–5	9th	
Norfolk State:		21–25	16–21		
Total:		21–25			
