= National Register of Historic Places listings in Ada County, Idaho =

Location of Ada County in Idaho

This is a list of the National Register of Historic Places listings in Ada County, Idaho.

This is intended to be a complete list of the properties and districts on the National Register of Historic Places in Ada County, Idaho, United States. Latitude and longitude coordinates are provided for many National Register properties and districts; these locations may be seen together in an online map.

There are 167 properties and districts listed on the National Register in the county, including 1 National Historic Landmark. More may be added; properties and districts nationwide are added to the Register almost on a weekly basis.

This National Park Service list is complete through NPS recent listings posted November 28, 2025.

== Current listings ==
| | Name on the Register | Image | Date listed | Location | City or town | Description |
|---|---|---|---|---|---|---|
| 1 | Walter Abbs House | Walter Abbs House | November 17, 1982 (#82000175) | 915 Fort St. 43°37′21″N 116°11′54″W | Boise | |
| 2 | Ada Odd Fellows Temple | Ada Odd Fellows Temple | November 17, 1982 (#82000176) | 109-115½ N. 9th St. 43°36′58″N 116°12′15″W | Boise | Only parts of the facade still standing |
| 3 | Ada Theater | Ada Theater | November 21, 1974 (#74000724) | 700 Main St. 43°36′54″N 116°12′05″W | Boise | |
| 4 | Aiken's Hotel | Aiken's Hotel | October 29, 1982 (#82000177) | 99 E. State St. 43°41′42″N 116°21′08″W | Eagle | |
| 5 | Alexander House | Alexander House | August 7, 1972 (#72000431) | 304 State St. 43°36′57″N 116°11′41″W | Boise | |
| 6 | Alexanders | Alexanders | November 20, 1978 (#78001029) | 9th and Main Sts. 43°36′59″N 116°12′15″W | Boise | |
| 7 | Marion Allsup House | | November 17, 1982 (#82000178) | 1601 N. 10th 43°37′43″N 116°11′57″W | Boise | One-story cottage designed by Tourtellotte and Co., having the least elaborate design of their surviving works to be included in a group listing. Has been demolished. |
| 8 | Anduiza Hotel | Anduiza Hotel | February 25, 2003 (#03000064) | 619 Grove St. 43°36′51″N 116°12′06″W | Boise | |
| 9 | Artesian Water Co. Pumphouse and Wells | Artesian Water Co. Pumphouse and Wells | July 26, 1979 (#79000763) | Off Warm Springs Avenue, formally State Highway 21; 43°36′16″N 116°09′46″W | Boise | |
| 10 | Assay Office | Assay Office | October 15, 1966 (#66000305) | 210 Main St. 43°36′41″N 116°11′45″W | Boise | |
| 11 | Barber Dam and Lumber Mill | Barber Dam and Lumber Mill | November 21, 1978 (#78001037) | East of Boise; 43°33′44″N 116°07′16″W | Boise | |
| 12 | Albert Beck House | Albert Beck House | November 17, 1982 (#82000179) | 1101 Fort St. 43°37′25″N 116°12′02″W | Boise | Moved to 801 12th Street (corner of 12th & Hays) |
| 13 | R. H. and Jessie Bell House | R. H. and Jessie Bell House | February 1, 2006 (#05001599) | 137 E. Pine St. 43°36′42″N 116°23′22″W | Meridian | |
| 14 | Boise Capitol Area District | Boise Capitol Area District | May 12, 1976 (#76000663) | Roughly bounded by 6th and Bannock, N. 8th, 8th, State, 5th, and Jefferson Sts. 43°37′01″N 116°11′59″W | Boise | Historic district including the Idaho State Capitol building. |
| 15 | Boise City National Bank | Boise City National Bank | November 28, 1978 (#78001030) | 8th and Idaho Sts. 43°36′59″N 116°12′08″W | Boise | |
| 16 | Boise City-Silver City Road-Fick Property Segment | Boise City-Silver City Road-Fick Property Segment | July 15, 1999 (#99000852) | 3232 W. Kuna-Mora Rd. 43°27′35″N 116°27′25″W | Kuna | |
| 17 | Boise High School Campus | Boise High School Campus | November 17, 1982 (#82000180) | Washington St. between 9th and 11th Sts. 43°37′15″N 116°12′03″W | Boise | |
| 18 | Boise Historic District | Boise Historic District | November 9, 1977 (#77000448) | 5th and 6th Sts., both sides of Idaho and Main Sts. 43°36′52″N 116°11′59″W | Boise | |
| 19 | Boise Junior College Administration Building | Boise Junior College Administration Building | November 17, 1982 (#82000181) | Boise State University campus 43°36′13″N 116°12′13″W | Boise | |
| 20 | Boise Junior High School | Boise Junior High School | November 17, 1982 (#82000186) | 1105 N. 13th St. 43°37′33″N 116°12′11″W | Boise | |
| 21 | Boulevard Mo-tel | Boulevard Mo-tel | January 7, 1998 (#97001609) | 1121 S. Capitol Boulevard; 43°36′25″N 116°12′36″W | Boise | |
| 22 | Joseph Bown House | Joseph Bown House | June 18, 1979 (#79000768) | 2020 E. Victory Rd. 43°34′34″N 116°09′23″W | Boise | |
| 23 | J. Gordon and Barbara J. Brookover House | | January 8, 2025 (#100011242) | 4704 Hillcrest View Drive. 43°35′01″N 116°14′23″W | Boise | |
| 24 | Brunzell House | Brunzell House | November 17, 1982 (#82000182) | 916 Franklin St. 43°37′16″N 116°12′00″W | Boise | |
| 24 | H. H. Bryant Garage | H. H. Bryant Garage | November 17, 1982 (#82000184) | 11th and Front Sts. 43°36′58″N 116°12′25″W | Boise | Replaced by a new garage building (now a bar) in 1990. |
| 25 | Aurelius and Dorothy Buckner House | Aurelius and Dorothy Buckner House | October 24, 2022 (#100008287) | 1012 North 19th St. 43°37′47″N 116°12′43″W | Boise | |
| 26 | H. C. Burnett House | H. C. Burnett House | November 17, 1982 (#82000183) | 124 W. Bannock St. 43°36′49″N 116°11′38″W | Boise | |
| 27 | Bushnell-Fisher House | Bushnell-Fisher House | November 2, 2011 (#11000777) | 349 W. State St. 43°41′41″N 116°21′30″W | Eagle | |
| 28 | Capitol Boulevard Memorial Bridge | Capitol Boulevard Memorial Bridge | November 5, 1990 (#90001717) | Capitol Boulevard over the Boise River; 43°36′32″N 116°12′26″W | Boise | |
| 29 | Carnegie Public Library | Carnegie Public Library | November 21, 1974 (#74000725) | 815 W. Washington St. 43°37′10″N 116°11′58″W | Boise | |
| 30 | C. C. Cavanah House | C. C. Cavanah House | November 17, 1982 (#82000185) | 107 E. Idaho St. 43°36′43″N 116°11′36″W | Boise | |
| 31 | Chinese Odd Fellows Building | Chinese Odd Fellows Building | November 17, 1982 (#82000187) | 610-612 Front St. 43°36′49″N 116°12′07″W | Boise | |
| 32 | Joseph Chitwood House | Joseph Chitwood House | August 23, 2006 (#06000709) | 1321 Denver St. 43°35′48″N 116°11′39″W | Boise | |
| 33 | Christ Chapel | Christ Chapel | July 17, 1974 (#74000726) | Broadway at Campus Dr. 43°36′12″N 116°11′34″W | Boise | |
| 34 | Christian Church | Christian Church | February 17, 1978 (#78001031) | 9th and Franklin Sts. 43°37′15″N 116°11′59″W | Boise | |
| 35 | Henry Coffin House | Henry Coffin House | November 17, 1982 (#82000188) | 1403 Franklin St. 43°37′26″N 116°12′20″W | Boise | |
| 36 | Cole School and Gymnasium | | November 8, 1982 (#82000189) | 7145 Fairview Ave. 43°37′08″N 116°16′27″W | Boise | |
| 37 | Collister School | Collister School | November 8, 1982 (#82000190) | 4426 Catalpa Dr. 43°39′21″N 116°14′35″W | Boise | |
| 38 | Congregation Beth Israel Synagogue | Congregation Beth Israel Synagogue | November 3, 1972 (#72000432) | 1102 State St. 43°37′15″N 116°12′15″W | Boise | |
| 39 | John Daly House | John Daly House | November 17, 1982 (#82000191) | 1015 W. Hays St. 43°37′19″N 116°11′57″W | Boise | |
| 40 | Dr. James Davies House | Dr. James Davies House | November 17, 1982 (#82000192) | 1107 W. Washington St. 43°37′17″N 116°12′11″W | Boise | |
| 41 | R. K. Davis House | R. K. Davis House | November 17, 1982 (#82000193) | 1016 Franklin St. 43°37′19″N 116°12′03″W | Boise | |
| 42 | Diversion Dam and Deer Flat Embankments | Diversion Dam and Deer Flat Embankments | March 15, 1976 (#76000666) | Southeast of Boise on the Boise River; 43°32′16″N 116°05′36″W | Boise | Extends into Canyon County |
| 43 | Dry Creek Rockshelter | Dry Creek Rockshelter | November 22, 1991 (#91001719) | Address Restricted | Boise | |
| 44 | William Dunbar House | William Dunbar House | November 17, 1982 (#82000195) | 1500 W. Hays St. 43°37′32″N 116°12′20″W | Boise | |
| 45 | Minnie Priest Dunton House | Minnie Priest Dunton House | November 17, 1982 (#82000194) | 906 Hays St. 43°37′19″N 116°11′55″W | Boise | |
| 46 | Eagle Adventist Schoolhouse | Eagle Adventist Schoolhouse | August 18, 1980 (#80001288) | Northwest of Eagle; 43°42′21″N 116°22′15″W | Eagle | |
| 47 | Pedro Echevarria House | Pedro Echevarria House | November 17, 1982 (#82000196) | 5605 State St. 43°39′21″N 116°15′33″W | Garden City | |
| 48 | Eichelberger Apartments | Eichelberger Apartments | November 17, 1982 (#82000197) | 612-24 N. 9th St. 43°37′15″N 116°11′57″W | Boise | |
| 49 | Elks Temple | Elks Temple | February 17, 1978 (#78001032) | 310 Jefferson St. 43°37′06″N 116°12′05″W | Boise | |
| 50 | Federal Building and U.S. Courthouse | Federal Building and U.S. Courthouse | September 19, 2019 (#100004402) | 550 W. Fort St. 43°37′11″N 116°11′42″W | Boise | |
| 51 | Firebird Raceway | Firebird Raceway | December 24, 2018 (#100003243) | 8551 ID 16; 43°46′02″N 116°28′05″W | Eagle vicinity | |
| 52 | Alva Fleharty House | Alva Fleharty House | November 17, 1982 (#82000198) | 907 Hays St. 43°37′18″N 116°11′57″W | Boise | |
| 53 | Fort Boise | Fort Boise | November 9, 1972 (#72000433) | About 1.5 miles northeast of the State Capitol; 43°37′17″N 116°11′01″W | Boise | |
| 54 | Fort Street Historic District | Fort Street Historic District | November 12, 1982 (#82000199) | Roughly bounded by Fort, State, 6th, and 16th Sts. 43°37′20″N 116°12′00″W | Boise | |
| 55 | Forty-Four and Sixty-Six Service Station | Forty-Four and Sixty-Six Service Station | November 15, 2019 (#100004673) | 3130 (3128) W. State St. 43°38′07″N 116°13′42″W | Boise | |
| 56 | Franklin School | Franklin School | November 8, 1982 (#82000200) | 5007 Franklin Rd. 43°36′09″N 116°14′38″W | Boise | |
| 57 | Friedline Apartments | Friedline Apartments | October 29, 1982 (#82000201) | 1312-1326 State St. 43°37′21″N 116°12′22″W | Boise | |
| 58 | H. K. Fritchman House | | November 17, 1982 (#82000202) | 1207 W. Hays St. 43°37′25″N 116°12′09″W | Boise | No longer standing at this address |
| 59 | Bishop Funsten House | Bishop Funsten House | January 3, 1983 (#83000256) | 2420 Old Penitentiary Rd. 43°36′12″N 116°09′42″W | Boise | |
| 60 | J. H. Gakey House | J. H. Gakey House | November 17, 1982 (#82000203) | 1402 Franklin St. 43°37′27″N 116°12′19″W | Boise | |
| 61 | GAR Hall | GAR Hall | January 21, 1974 (#74000727) | 714 W. State St. 43°37′07″N 116°11′55″W | Boise | |
| 62 | Garfield School | Garfield School | November 8, 1982 (#82000204) | 1914 Broadway Ave. 43°35′23″N 116°11′33″W | Boise | |
| 63 | Anton Goreczky House | Anton Goreczky House | March 20, 1986 (#86000438) | 1601 N. 7th St. 43°38′15″N 116°11′43″W | Boise | |
| 64 | John Green Mausoleum | John Green Mausoleum | November 17, 1982 (#82000205) | Morris Hill Cemetery; 43°36′37″N 116°13′52″W | Boise | |
| 65 | Guernsey Dairy Milk Depot | Guernsey Dairy Milk Depot | November 17, 1982 (#82000206) | 2419 State St. 43°37′46″N 116°13′09″W | Boise | |
| 66 | Guffey Butte-Black Butte Archeological District | Guffey Butte-Black Butte Archeological District | October 10, 1978 (#78001038) | Along approximately 34 miles (55 km) of the Snake River in Canyon, Ada, Owyhee, and Elmore counties 43°13′24″N 116°22′28″W | Grand View | |
| 67 | John Haines House | John Haines House | November 17, 1982 (#82000207) | 919 W. Hays St. 43°37′19″N 116°11′58″W | Boise | |
| 68 | Harrison Boulevard Historic District | Harrison Boulevard Historic District | February 29, 1980 (#80001286) | An irregular pattern along Harrison Boulevard; 43°37′52″N 116°12′30″W | Boise | |
| 69 | Samuel Hays House | Samuel Hays House | November 17, 1982 (#82000208) | 612 Franklin St. 43°37′11″N 116°11′46″W | Boise | |
| 70 | Clara Hill House | Clara Hill House | February 1, 2006 (#05001600) | 1123 N. Main St. 43°36′52″N 116°23′28″W | Meridian | |
| 71 | Hopffgarten House | Hopffgarten House | August 30, 1979 (#79000764) | 1115 W. Boise Ave. 43°35′28″N 116°11′43″W | Boise | |
| 72 | Fred Hottes House | Fred Hottes House | November 17, 1982 (#82000209) | 509 W. Hays St. 43°37′09″N 116°11′40″W | Boise | |
| 73 | E. F. Hunt House | E. F. Hunt House | November 17, 1982 (#82000210) | 49 E. State; 43°36′46″N 116°23′29″W | Meridian | |
| 74 | Hyde Park Historic District | Hyde Park Historic District | October 29, 1982 (#82000211) | Both sides of N. 13th St. between Alturas and Brumback Sts. 43°37′49″N 116°12′09″W | Boise | |
| 75 | Idaho Building | Idaho Building | December 8, 1978 (#78001033) | Bannock and 8th Sts. 43°37′01″N 116°12′03″W | Boise | |
| 76 | Idaho National Guard Armory | Idaho National Guard Armory | February 26, 1999 (#99000253) | 801 Reserve St. 43°36′51″N 116°11′02″W | Boise | |
| 77 | Idaho State Forester's Building | Idaho State Forester's Building | January 16, 1997 (#96001591) | 801 S. Capitol Boulevard; 43°36′35″N 116°12′27″W | Boise | |
| 78 | Idanha Hotel | Idanha Hotel | July 9, 1974 (#74000728) | 10th and Main Sts. 43°37′00″N 116°12′17″W | Boise | |
| 79 | Immanuel Evangelical Lutheran Church | Immanuel Evangelical Lutheran Church | June 17, 1976 (#76000664) | 707 W. Fort St. 43°37′16″N 116°12′05″W | Boise | |
| 80 | Immanuel Methodist Episcopal Church | Immanuel Methodist Episcopal Church | November 17, 1982 (#82000212) | 1406 Eastman; 43°37′50″N 116°12′14″W | Boise | |
| 81 | Orville Jackson House | Orville Jackson House | November 17, 1982 (#82000213) | 127 S. Eagle Rd. 43°41′39″N 116°21′12″W | Eagle | |
| 82 | Cyrus Jacobs House | Cyrus Jacobs House | November 27, 1972 (#72000434) | 607 Grove St. 43°36′49″N 116°12′05″W | Boise | |
| 83 | W. E. Jefferson House | W. E. Jefferson House | November 17, 1982 (#82000214) | 1117 N. 8th St. 43°37′28″N 116°11′49″W | Boise | |
| 84 | J. M. Johnson House | J. M. Johnson House | November 17, 1982 (#82000215) | 1002 Franklin; 43°37′18″N 116°12′01″W | Boise | |
| 85 | T. J. Jones Apartments | T. J. Jones Apartments | November 17, 1982 (#82000216) | 10th St. and Fort; 43°37′22″N 116°11′56″W | Boise | |
| 86 | Kieldson Double House | Kieldson Double House | November 17, 1982 (#82000217) | 413-415 Jefferson St. 43°36′57″N 116°11′48″W | Boise | |
| 87 | Joseph Kinney Mausoleum | Joseph Kinney Mausoleum | November 17, 1982 (#82000218) | Morris Hill Cemetery; 43°36′35″N 116°13′40″W | Boise | |
| 88 | Lilyquist-Christianson Building | Lilyquist-Christianson Building | April 1, 1999 (#99000415) | 459 W. 3rd 43°29′26″N 116°25′03″W | Kuna | |
| 89 | Thomas E. Logan House | Thomas E. Logan House | September 22, 1971 (#71000289) | 602 N. Julia Davis Dr. 43°36′38″N 116°12′16″W | Boise | |
| 90 | Longfellow School | Longfellow School | November 8, 1982 (#82000219) | 1511 N. 9th St. 43°37′44″N 116°11′53″W | Boise | |
| 91 | Lowell Municipal Pool | Lowell Municipal Pool | September 1, 2022 (#100008169) | 1601 North 28th St. 43°38′05″N 116°13′25″W | Boise | |
| 92 | Lowell School | Lowell School | November 8, 1982 (#82000220) | 1507 N. 28th St. 43°38′02″N 116°13′23″W | Boise | |
| 93 | Lower Main Street Commercial Historic District | Lower Main Street Commercial Historic District | November 28, 1980 (#80001290) | Main St. between 10th and 12th Sts. 43°37′02″N 116°12′17″W | Boise | |
| 94 | M. J. Marks House | M. J. Marks House | November 17, 1982 (#82000221) | 1001 W. Hays St. 43°37′20″N 116°12′04″W | Boise | |
| 95 | Judge Charles P. McCarthy House | Judge Charles P. McCarthy House | August 30, 1979 (#79000765) | 1415 Fort St. 43°37′31″N 116°12′16″W | Boise | |
| 96 | H. E. McElroy House | H. E. McElroy House | November 17, 1982 (#82000222) | 924 W. Fort St. 43°37′23″N 116°11′55″W | Boise | |
| 97 | Meridian Exchange Bank | Meridian Exchange Bank | November 17, 1982 (#82000223) | 109 E. 2nd St. 43°36′38″N 116°23′22″W | Meridian | |
| 98 | Meridian Speedway | Meridian Speedway | February 29, 2024 (#100008284) | 355 South Main St. 43°36′07″N 116°23′26″W | Meridian | |
| 99 | Willis Mickle House | Willis Mickle House | November 17, 1982 (#82000224) | 1415 N. 8th St. 43°37′38″N 116°11′49″W | Boise | |
| 100 | Mitchell Hotel | Mitchell Hotel | November 17, 1982 (#82000225) | 10th and Front Sts. 43°36′56″N 116°12′23″W | Boise | |
| 101 | Mittleider Farmstead Historic District | | March 20, 2003 (#03000122) | 575 Rumpel Ln. 43°34′05″N 116°23′09″W | Meridian | |
| 102 | Moore-Cunningham House | Moore-Cunningham House | April 29, 1977 (#77000449) | 1109 Warm Springs Ave. 43°36′24″N 116°10′53″W | Boise | |
| 103 | Morris Hill Cemetery Mausoleum | Morris Hill Cemetery Mausoleum | November 17, 1982 (#82000226) | Morris Hill Cemetery; 43°36′27″N 116°13′45″W | Boise | |
| 104 | Mountain States Telephone and Telegraph Company Building | Mountain States Telephone and Telegraph Company Building | September 17, 2008 (#08000905) | 815 N. Main St. 43°36′41″N 116°23′31″W | Meridian | |
| 105 | Daniel F. Murphy House | Daniel F. Murphy House | May 17, 1982 (#82002504) | 1608 N. 9th St. 43°37′44″N 116°11′51″W | Boise | |
| 106 | Halbert F. and Grace Neal House | Halbert F. and Grace Neal House | October 19, 1982 (#82000227) | 101 W. Pine St. 43°36′43″N 116°23′34″W | Meridian | |
| 107 | W. Scott Neal House | W. Scott Neal House | November 17, 1982 (#82000228) | 215 E. Jefferson; 43°36′46″N 116°11′26″W | Boise | |
| 108 | H. R. Neitzel House | H. R. Neitzel House | November 17, 1982 (#82000229) | 705 N. 9th St. 43°37′16″N 116°11′57″W | Boise | |
| 109 | Ninth Street Bridge | Ninth Street Bridge | September 14, 2001 (#01000980) | East of the new 9th Street bridge, over the Boise River; 43°36′34″N 116°12′29″W | Boise | |
| 110 | Axel Nixon House | Axel Nixon House | November 17, 1982 (#82000230) | 815 N. Hays St. 43°37′16″N 116°11′53″W | Boise | |
| 111 | John A. O'Farrell Cabin | John A. O'Farrell Cabin | December 3, 1999 (#99001415) | W. Fort St. between N. 4th and N. 5th Sts. 43°37′09″N 116°11′36″W | Boise | |
| 112 | John A. O'Farrell House | John A. O'Farrell House | September 4, 1979 (#79000766) | 420 W. Franklin St; 43°37′07″N 116°11′27″W | Boise | |
| 113 | Old Idaho State Penitentiary | Old Idaho State Penitentiary | July 17, 1974 (#74000729) | 2200 Warm Springs Ave. 43°35′58″N 116°09′20″W | Boise | |
| 114 | Oregon Trail | Oregon Trail | October 18, 1972 (#72000435) | 2 miles southeast of Boise and continuing southeast for 8 miles 43°33′45″N 116°09′19″W | Boise | |
| 115 | Owyhee Motorcycle Club | | October 6, 2022 (#100008236) | 6600 North Cartwright Rd. 43°40′38″N 116°12′03″W | Boise vicinity | |
| 116 | John Parker House | John Parker House | November 17, 1982 (#82000231) | 713 Franklin St. 43°37′12″N 116°11′51″W | Boise | |
| 117 | Charles Paynton House | Charles Paynton House | November 17, 1982 (#82000232) | 1213 N. 8th St. 43°37′32″N 116°11′49″W | Boise | |
| 118 | Dr. John and Elaine Phillips House | Dr. John and Elaine Phillips House | November 20, 2019 (#100004672) | 3233 Edson St. 43°35′42″N 116°13′20″W | Boise | |
| 119 | Pierce Park School | Pierce Park School | November 8, 1982 (#82000233) | 5015 Pierce Park Lane; 43°39′58″N 116°16′06″W | Boise | |
| 120 | Pierce-Borah House | Pierce-Borah House | January 3, 1983 (#83000257) | West of Garden City off U.S. Route 26; 43°39′32″N 116°18′14″W | Garden City vicinity | |
| 121 | Reclamation Service Boise Project Office | Reclamation Service Boise Project Office | August 12, 2010 (#10000546) | 214 Broadway Ave. 43°36′33″N 116°11′34″W | Boise | |
| 122 | John Regan American Legion Hall | John Regan American Legion Hall | November 17, 1982 (#82000234) | 401 W. Idaho St. 43°36′18″N 116°11′51″W | Boise | |
| 123 | Fred Reiger Houses | Fred Reiger Houses | November 17, 1982 (#82000235) | 214 and 216-18 E. Jefferson St. 43°37′16″N 116°11′23″W | Boise | |
| 124 | Corilla J. and Orlando Robbins House | Corilla J. and Orlando Robbins House | July 27, 2020 (#100005362) | 512 West Idaho St. 43°36′54″N 116°11′59″W | Boise | |
| 125 | Roosevelt School | Roosevelt School | November 8, 1982 (#82000236) | 908 E. Jefferson St. 43°36′36″N 116°10′54″W | Boise | |
| 126 | Rosedale Odd Fellows Temple | Rosedale Odd Fellows Temple | November 17, 1982 (#82000237) | 1755 Broadway; 43°35′30″N 116°11′35″W | Boise | |
| 127 | Mrs. A. F. Rossi House | Mrs. A. F. Rossi House | November 17, 1982 (#82000238) | 1711 Boise Ave. 43°35′48″N 116°12′07″W | Boise | |
| 128 | St. Alphonsus' Hospital Nurses' Home and Heating Plant/Laundry | St. Alphonsus' Hospital Nurses' Home and Heating Plant/Laundry | November 17, 1982 (#82000244) | N. 4th St. between Washington and State Sts. 43°37′00″N 116°11′39″W | Boise | The 1902 hospital was across Fourth Street, on the site of the Cenarrusa state office building. Vacated in 1972, plans were to restore it for state offices, but after damage from a suspected arson in November 1976, it was razed. |
| 129 | St. John's Cathedral | St. John's Cathedral | May 24, 1978 (#78001035) | 8th and Hays Sts. 43°37′18″N 116°11′51″W | Boise | |
| 130 | St. John's Cathedral Block | St. John's Cathedral Block | November 17, 1982 (#82000245) | Bounded by 8th, Hays, 9th, and Fort Sts. 43°37′18″N 116°11′51″W | Boise | |
| 131 | St. Mary's Catholic Church | St. Mary's Catholic Church | November 17, 1982 (#82000246) | State and 26th Sts. 43°37′54″N 116°13′15″W | Boise | |
| 132 | St. Paul Missionary Baptist Church | St. Paul Missionary Baptist Church | October 29, 1982 (#82000247) | 124 Broadway Ave. 43°36′37″N 116°11′31″W | Boise | |
| 133 | Schick-Ostolasa Farmstead | Schick-Ostolasa Farmstead | August 23, 2006 (#06000710) | 5213 Dry Creek Rd. 43°43′23″N 116°14′53″W | Boise | |
| 134 | H. A. Schmelzel House | H. A. Schmelzel House | November 17, 1982 (#82000239) | 615 W. Hays St. 43°37′12″N 116°11′45″W | Boise | |
| 135 | Adolph Schreiber House | Adolph Schreiber House | November 17, 1982 (#82000240) | 524 W. Franklin St. 43°37′09″N 116°11′43″W | Boise | |
| 136 | Emerson and Lucretia Sensenig House | Emerson and Lucretia Sensenig House | January 16, 1997 (#96001590) | 1519 W. Jefferson St. 43°37′21″N 116°12′34″W | Boise | |
| 137 | O. F. Short House | O. F. Short House | May 23, 1980 (#80001289) | West of Eagle on State Highway 44; 43°42′07″N 116°21′40″W | Eagle | |
| 138 | William Sidenfaden House | William Sidenfaden House | November 17, 1982 (#82000241) | 906 Franklin St. 43°37′17″N 116°11′59″W | Boise | |
| 139 | W. A. Simpson House | W. A. Simpson House | November 17, 1982 (#82000242) | 1004 N. 10 St. 43°37′27″N 116°11′55″W | Boise | |
| 140 | Nathan Smith House | Nathan Smith House | January 3, 1983 (#83000258) | Broadway and Targhee; 43°34′56″N 116°11′39″W | Boise | |
| 141 | Sonner-Osier Farmstead Historic District | Sonner-Osier Farmstead Historic District | June 5, 2017 (#100001021) | 4130 W. Beacon Light Rd. 43°43′17″N 116°24′19″W | Eagle | |
| 142 | South Boise Fire Station | South Boise Fire Station | November 17, 1982 (#82000243) | 1011 Williams St. 43°35′26″N 116°11′40″W | Boise | |
| 143 | South Eighth Street Historic District | South Eighth Street Historic District | December 12, 1977 (#77000450) | Roughly bounded by 8th, 9th, Miller, and Broad Sts. 43°36′47″N 116°12′21″W | Boise | |
| 144 | South Municipal Pool | | September 1, 2022 (#100008162) | 921 South Shoshone St. 43°35′43″N 116°13′08″W | Boise | |
| 145 | Almon W. and Dr. Mary E. Spaulding Ranch | Almon W. and Dr. Mary E. Spaulding Ranch | November 25, 1994 (#94001363) | 3805 N. Cole Rd. 43°38′22″N 116°16′29″W | Boise | |
| 146 | Star Camp | Star Camp | April 27, 2005 (#05000344) | N. Star Rd. and W. 3rd St. 43°41′41″N 116°29′37″W | Star | |
| 147 | State Street Historic District | State Street Historic District | December 15, 1978 (#78001036) | Jefferson, 2nd, and 3rd Sts. 43°36′55″N 116°11′36″W | Boise | |
| 148 | Louis Stephan House | Louis Stephan House | November 17, 1982 (#82000248) | 1709 N. 18th St. 43°38′06″N 116°12′37″W | Boise | |
| 149 | Swan Falls Dam and Power Plant | Swan Falls Dam and Power Plant | July 6, 1976 (#76000667) | East of Murphy at the Snake River; 43°14′35″N 116°22′48″W | Murphy | |
| 150 | Tolleth House | Tolleth House | December 20, 1996 (#96001506) | 134 E. State Ave. 43°36′47″N 116°23′23″W | Meridian | |
| 151 | John Tourtellotte Building | John Tourtellotte Building | November 17, 1982 (#82000249) | 210-222 N. 10th St. 43°37′05″N 116°12′12″W | Boise | |
| 152 | Bishop Daniel S. Tuttle House | Bishop Daniel S. Tuttle House | December 4, 1980 (#80001291) | 512 N. 8th St. 43°37′09″N 116°11′56″W | Boise | |
| 153 | Union Block and Montandon Buildings | Union Block and Montandon Buildings | March 7, 1979 (#79000767) | 8th and Idaho Sts. 43°36′59″N 116°12′04″W | Boise | |
| 154 | Union Pacific Mainline Depot | Union Pacific Mainline Depot | August 7, 1974 (#74000730) | 1701 Eastover Terrace; 43°36′08″N 116°12′47″W | Boise | |
| 155 | Ustick School | Ustick School | October 29, 1982 (#82000250) | 2971 Mumbarto St. 43°37′54″N 116°19′21″W | Boise | |
| 156 | Charles and Martha Villeneuve House | Charles and Martha Villeneuve House | November 13, 1990 (#90001731) | 7575 Moon Valley Rd. 43°41′20″N 116°26′51″W | Eagle | |
| 157 | J. N. Wallace House | J. N. Wallace House | November 17, 1982 (#82000251) | 1202 Franklin St. 43°37′23″N 116°12′10″W | Boise | |
| 158 | Warm Springs Avenue Historic District | Warm Springs Avenue Historic District | September 22, 1980 (#80001287) | Warm Springs Ave. 43°36′24″N 116°10′50″W | Boise | |
| 159 | C. H. Waymire Building | C. H. Waymire Building | November 17, 1982 (#82000252) | 1521 N. 13th St. 43°37′49″N 116°12′10″W | Boise | |
| 160 | Edward Welch House | Edward Welch House | November 17, 1982 (#82000253) | 1321 E. Jefferson St. 43°36′26″N 116°10′38″W | Boise | |
| 161 | Wellman Apartments | Wellman Apartments | November 17, 1982 (#82000254) | 5th and Franklin Sts. 43°37′08″N 116°11′40″W | Boise | |
| 162 | West Warm Springs Historic District | West Warm Springs Historic District | December 12, 1977 (#77000451) | Warm Springs Ave. and Main, 1st, 2nd, and Idaho Sts. 43°36′42″N 116°11′40″W | Boise | |
| 163 | William Whitehead House | William Whitehead House | April 19, 2016 (#16000176) | 3921 W. Catalpa Dr. 43°39′19″N 116°14′17″W | Boise | |
| 164 | Whitney School | Whitney School | November 8, 1982 (#82000255) | 1609 S. Owyhee St. 43°35′19″N 116°13′25″W | Boise | Replaced by new Whitney Elementary School in 2009 |
| 165 | Wolters Double Houses | Wolters Double Houses | November 17, 1982 (#82000256) | 712-16 and 720-22 N. 8th St. 43°37′14″N 116°11′50″W | Boise | |
| 166 | Zurcher Apartments | Zurcher Apartments | November 17, 1982 (#82000257) | 102 S. 17th St. 43°37′16″N 116°12′48″W | Boise | |

== Former listings ==
| | Name on the Register | Image | Date listed | Date removed | Location | City or town | Description |
|---|---|---|---|---|---|---|---|
| 1 | Moore-DeLamar House | | July 9, 1970 (#70000915) | September 29, 1972 | 807 Grove St. | Boise | Demolished |
| 2 | Overland Building | Overland Building | September 21, 1978 (#78001034) | February 9, 1987 | 8th and Main Sts. | Boise | Renamed the Eastman Building in 1926, designed by Tourtellotte and Company. Originally four stories when it opened in 1905 as the Overland Building, two more were added in 1910. It was renamed following the owner's death in 1926 and was filled with legal, dental, and medical offices. It gradually fell from favor and it was acquired in 1972 by the Boise Redevelopment Agency for a proposed downtown mall. Slated for demolition in 1978, preservationist interests intervened and it stood idle for nearly another decade. An offer was made in 1981 to move it several blocks south to the 8th Street Marketplace. With plans finally set for its refurbishment, the Eastman Building was destroyed two days later by fire in January 1987, fought by more than one hundred firefighters for a over day and a half, and was demolished soon after. |
| 3 | St. Alphonsus Hospital | | July 30, 1976 (#76000665) | February 22, 1977 | 508 N. 5th St. | Boise | The 1902 hospital was on the site of the Cenarrusa state office building. Vacated in 1972, plans were to restore it for state offices, but after damage from a suspected arson in November 1976, it was razed. |
| 4 | MacMillan Chapel | MacMillan Chapel | September 7, 1984 (#84000989) | 2004 | West of Boise; 43°38′56″N 116°19′58″W | Boise | MacMillan Chapel was moved in 2004 from Ada County to Canyon County, and it is included on the Canyon County page. |

== See also ==
- List of National Historic Landmarks in Idaho
- National Register of Historic Places listings in Idaho
