= Albert Beck House =

- U.S. National Register of Historic Places
- The Albert Beck House in 1979

- Location within Idaho Location within the United States
- Location: 801 12th St., Boise, Idaho
- Coordinates: 43.623498°N 116.202937°W
- Area: less than one acre
- Built: 1904
- Architect: Tourtellotte, John E. & Company
- Architectural style: Queen Anne
- MPS: Tourtellotte and Hummel Architecture TR
- NRHP reference No.: 82000179
- Added to NRHP: November 17, 1982

The Albert Beck House in Boise, Idaho, is a 1 1/2-story Queen Anne house designed by Tourtellotte & Co. and constructed in 1904. The house features sandstone veneer on its first floor walls and on a wrap around porch. Overhanging gables with dimpled dormer vents were prominent at the Fort Street and 11th Street exposures. The house was added to the National Register of Historic Places in 1982.

The Beck House was constructed at 1101 Fort Street, lot 12 of block 75 of Boise's original townsite, near the site of the Cathedral of the Rockies, completed in 1960. In 1989 the First United Methodist Church, owners of the cathedral, purchased the Beck House and other historic properties in block 75 and planned to build a large parking lot. Three historic homes were demolished, but a neighborhood preservation effort managed to save some of the other properties. Eventually the Beck House was moved to the corner of 12th and Hays Streets. Since 2011 block 75 has been managed by Boise Downtown Teaching Farm.

Albert Beck was a sheep rancher in Boise, and he and partner Obe Corder owned a mining interest at the site of the Sunbeam Mine.

== See also ==
- Fort Street Historic District
- National Register of Historic Places listings in Ada County, Idaho
