= C. H. Waymire Building =

U.S. National Register of Historic Places

- Waymire, C. H., Building
- U.S. National Register of Historic Places
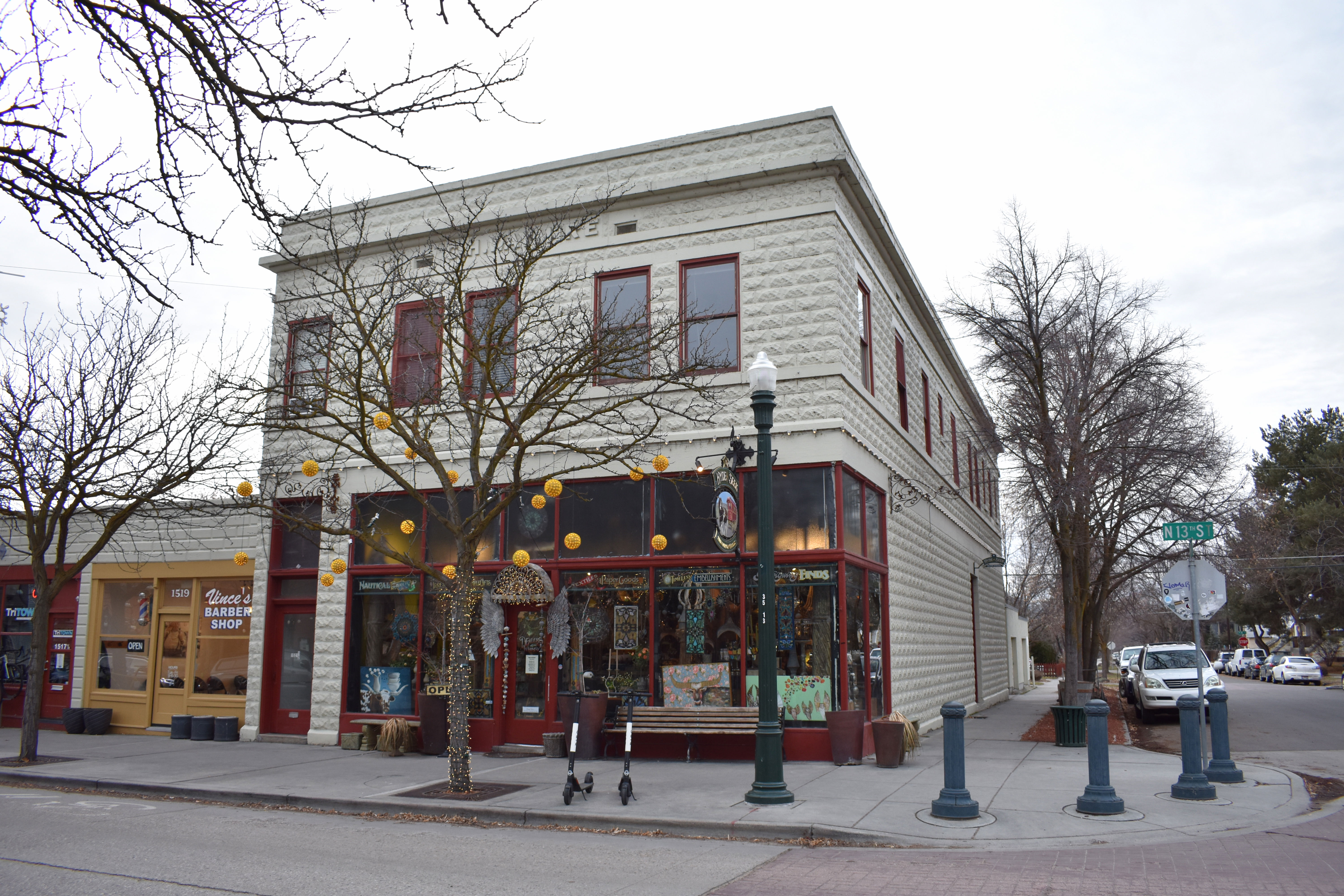
- The C.H. Waymire Building in 2019

- Location within Idaho Location within the United States
- Location: 1521 N. 13th St., Boise, Idaho
- Coordinates: 43°37′49″N 116°12′10″W
- Area: less than one acre
- Built: 1909
- Built by: Shaffer, Hawk, & Clark
- Architect: Tourtellotte, John E. & Company
- MPS: Tourtellotte and Hummel Architecture TR
- NRHP reference No.: 82000252
- Added to NRHP: November 17, 1982

The C.H. Waymire Building in Boise, Idaho, is a 2-story, cement block structure designed by Tourtellotte & Co. and constructed in 1909. The building housed Waymire Grocery, a neighborhood market.

== History ==
Clarence H. Waymire arrived in Boise in 1884 and operated a dairy under the name of Waymire & Brown. In 1892 Waymire purchased his partner's share of the business. In 1902 Waymire constructed a 2-story, wood-frame grocery store at the southwest corner of 13th and Eastman Streets, and in 1909 the building was moved to the rear of the lot and turned to face Eastman Street, enabling the store to function during construction of the C.H. Waymire Building at the corner. At the time, the Idaho Statesman noted that the building was the first large store in Boise to be constructed of cement blocks.

The C.H. Waymire Building included a post office and was a local polling place during elections. Waymire sold his grocery business in 1914, but he continued to make improvements to that and to other buildings, and the west side of 13th street between Alturas and Eastman Streets became known as the Waymire Block.

== See also ==
- Hyde Park, Boise, Idaho
- National Register of Historic Places listings in Ada County, Idaho
