= W. A. Simpson House =

Historic building in Boise, Idaho

- U.S. National Register of Historic Places
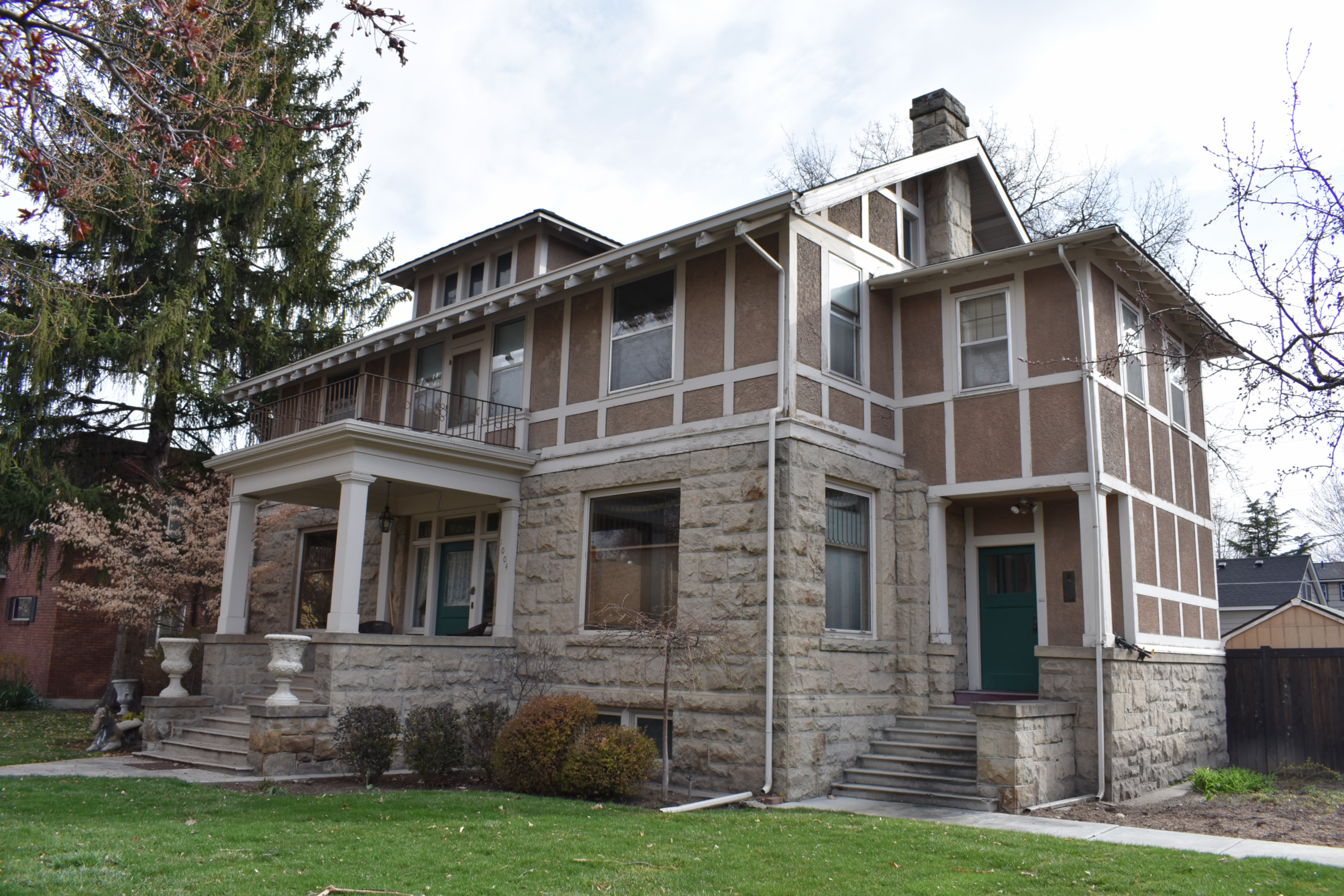
- The W.A. Simpson House in 2019

- Location within Idaho Location within the United States
- Location: 1004 N. 10 St., Boise, Idaho
- Coordinates: 43°37′27″N 116°11′55″W
- Area: less than one acre
- Built: 1909
- Architect: Tourtellotte, John E. & Company
- Architectural style: Bungalow/craftsman
- MPS: Tourtellotte and Hummel Architecture TR
- NRHP reference No.: 82000242
- Added to NRHP: November 17, 1982

The W.A. Simpson House in Boise, Idaho, United States, is a 2-story Bungalow designed by Tourtellotte & Co. and constructed in 1909. Sandstone veneer covers first floor outer walls, and the second floor is veneered in stucco. The house shows a Tudor Revival influence with half-timber decorations above the sandstone. An attic dormer faces the 10th Street exposure, and the roof depends on a single, lateral ridgebeam. The house was added to the National Register of Historic Places in 1982.

== William A. Simpson ==
William A. Simpson (March 3, 1846 – June 4, 1916) was a Boise City pioneer, arriving by oxcart in 1868. He operated a freight packing business between Boise City, Silver City, and Idaho City, and he later raised cattle on a large farm. Prior to building the W.A. Simpson House in 1909, William and Dora (Chase) Simpson sold their 887-acre farm near Meridian, although they had resided for 20 years in a smaller dwelling on the Simpson House property.

When William Simpson died in 1916, Dora Simpson continued to live at the Simpson House, rebuilding the front porch in 1920. She died in 1934.

== See also ==
- Fort Street Historic District
- National Register of Historic Places listings in Ada County, Idaho
