= Mitchell Hotel =

Historic building in Idaho, USA

- U.S. National Register of Historic Places
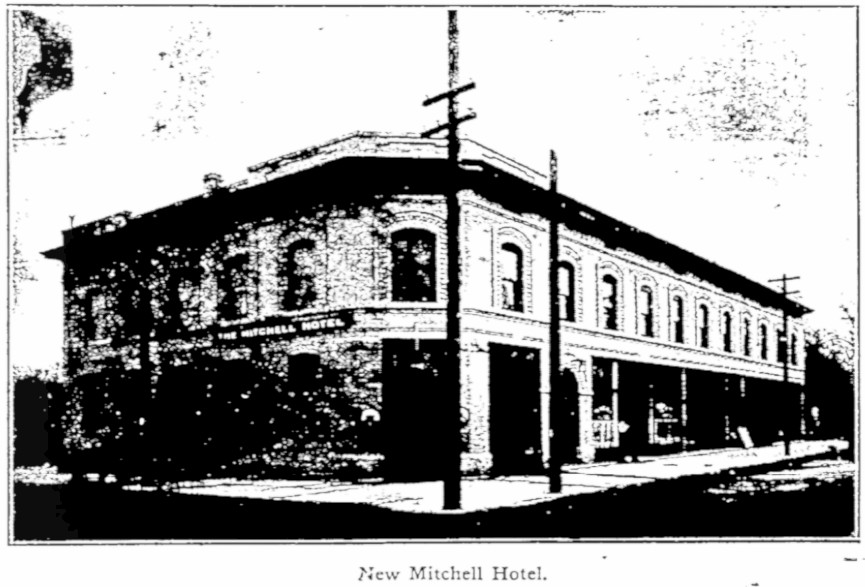
- The Mitchell Hotel in 1906

- Location within Idaho Location within the United States
- Location: 10th and Front Sts., Boise, Idaho
- Coordinates: 43°36′56″N 116°12′23″W
- Area: less than one acre
- Built: 1906
- Architect: Tourtellotte, John E. & Company
- MPS: Tourtellotte and Hummel Architecture TR
- NRHP reference No.: 82000225
- Added to NRHP: November 17, 1982

The Mitchell Hotel in Boise, Idaho, was a 2-story, brick and stone building designed by Tourtellotte & Co. and constructed in 1906. The building featured segmentally arched fenestrations with "denticulated surrounds of header brick." The building was listed on the National Register of Historic Places (NRHP) in 1982.

Considered a modern hotel in 1906, the building included steam heat and plumbing in each of 40 second-floor, "cozily furnished" rooms. The first floor contained a restaurant and a barbershop, and later a millinery shop occupied one of the storefronts. The building also served briefly as a polling place for precinct four in local elections.

Edward Mitchell was the first proprietor of the hotel, and he sold the building within a year after opening.

In 1974 Good Medicine Natural Foods opened in the building, followed by Natural Foods Cafe. The restaurant had closed by September, 1976. After its listing on the NRHP in 1982, the building was demolished and replaced by a parking lot.

== See also ==
- National Register of Historic Places listings in Ada County, Idaho
