= Marion Allsup House =

Historic building in Boise, Idaho

- U.S. National Register of Historic Places
- The Marion Allsup House in 1981

- Location within Idaho Location within the United States
- Location: 1601 N. 10th, Boise, Idaho
- Coordinates: 43°37′43″N 116°11′57″W
- Area: less than one acre
- Built: 1901
- Architect: Tourtellotte, John E. & Company
- Architectural style: Neoclassical, Colonial Revival
- MPS: Tourtellotte and Hummel Architecture TR
- NRHP reference No.: 82000178
- Added to NRHP: November 17, 1982

The Marion Allsup House in Boise, Idaho, was a 1-story, 5-room cottage designed by Tourtellotte & Co. and constructed in 1901. The house featured Colonial Revival or Neoclassical details, including narrow shiplap siding, a cross facade porch, and a pyramid roof. The Allsup House was the least elaborate design of all surviving houses from the Tourtellotte thematic group. The house was added to the National Register of Historic Places (NRHP) in 1982. The Allsup House either was demolished or renovated after its nomination and listing on the NRHP, and the current 2-story house at the site retains no similarity to the modest 1901 design drawn by Tourtellotte & Co.

Marion F. Allsup was a cement and plaster contractor who worked on the Idanha Hotel, the Belgravia Building, and St. Michael's Cathedral. By 1917 he may have moved to Flagstaff, Arizona.

== See also ==
- National Register of Historic Places listings in Ada County, Idaho
