= Friedline Apartments =

Historic NRHP building in Boise Idaho

- U.S. National Register of Historic Places
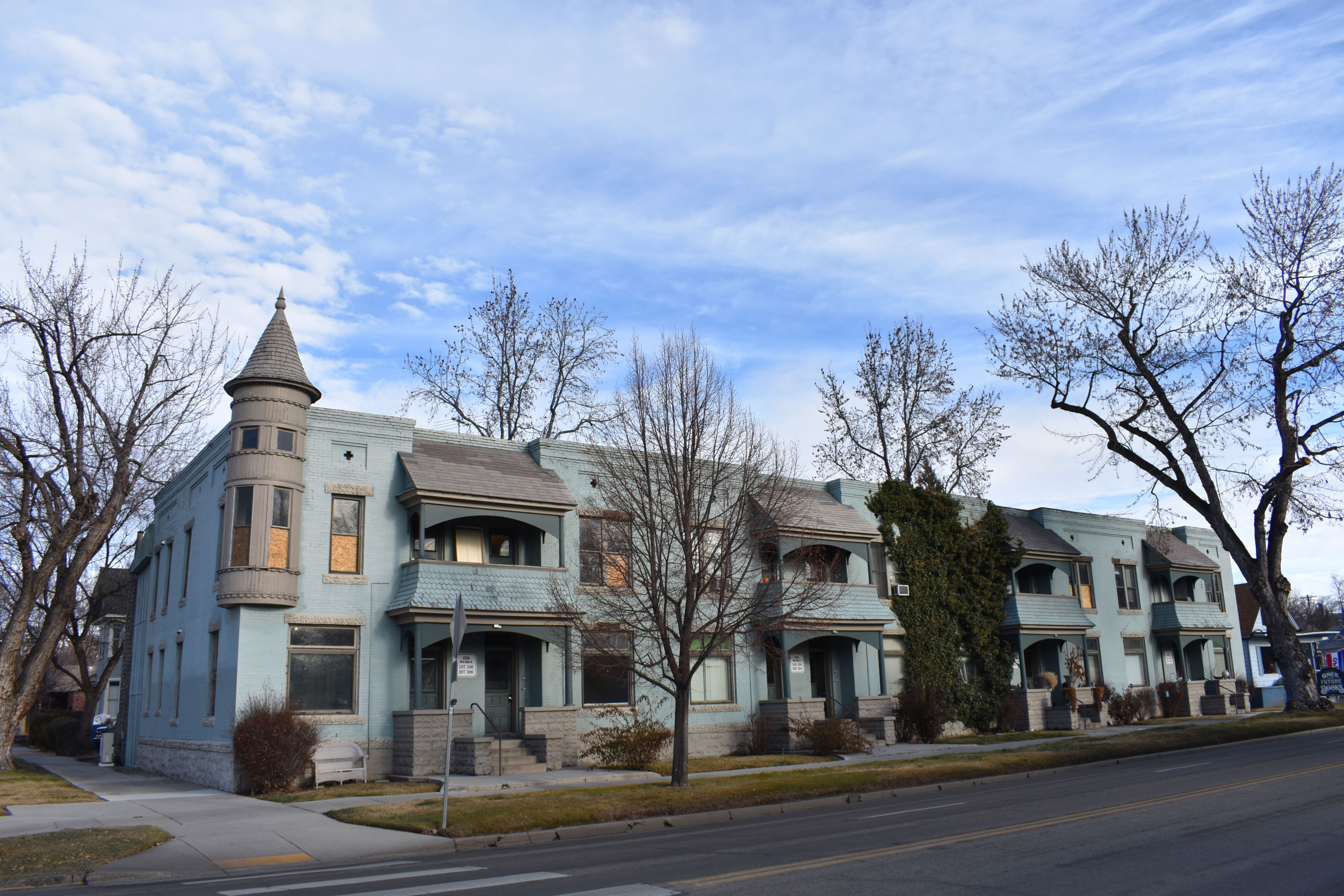
- The Friedline Apartments in 2019

- Location within Idaho Location within the United States
- Location: 1312-1326 State St., Boise, Idaho
- Coordinates: 43°37′21″N 116°12′22″W
- Area: less than one acre
- Built: 1904
- Architect: Cartee, Ross
- Architectural style: Queen Anne
- NRHP reference No.: 82000201
- Added to NRHP: October 29, 1982

The Friedline Apartments in Boise, Idaho, is a Queen Anne style apartment building designed by Ross Cartee and constructed in 1902. The sandstone and brick building features a 3/4-round turret at the corner of W State and 14th Streets. The building was listed on the National Register of Historic Places in 1982.

When the building opened in 1902, it contained eight 2-story apartments, each with six rooms and "neat porticos over the entrance to each pair of houses."

== Abraham Friedline ==
Dr. Abraham Friedline (May 8, 1848 – April 29, 1914) was a dentist who moved to Boise in 1897 and opened the Denver Dental Parlors. He also invested in real estate and mining companies.

== See also ==
- National Register of Historic Places listings in Ada County, Idaho
