= Zurcher Apartments =

- U.S. National Register of Historic Places
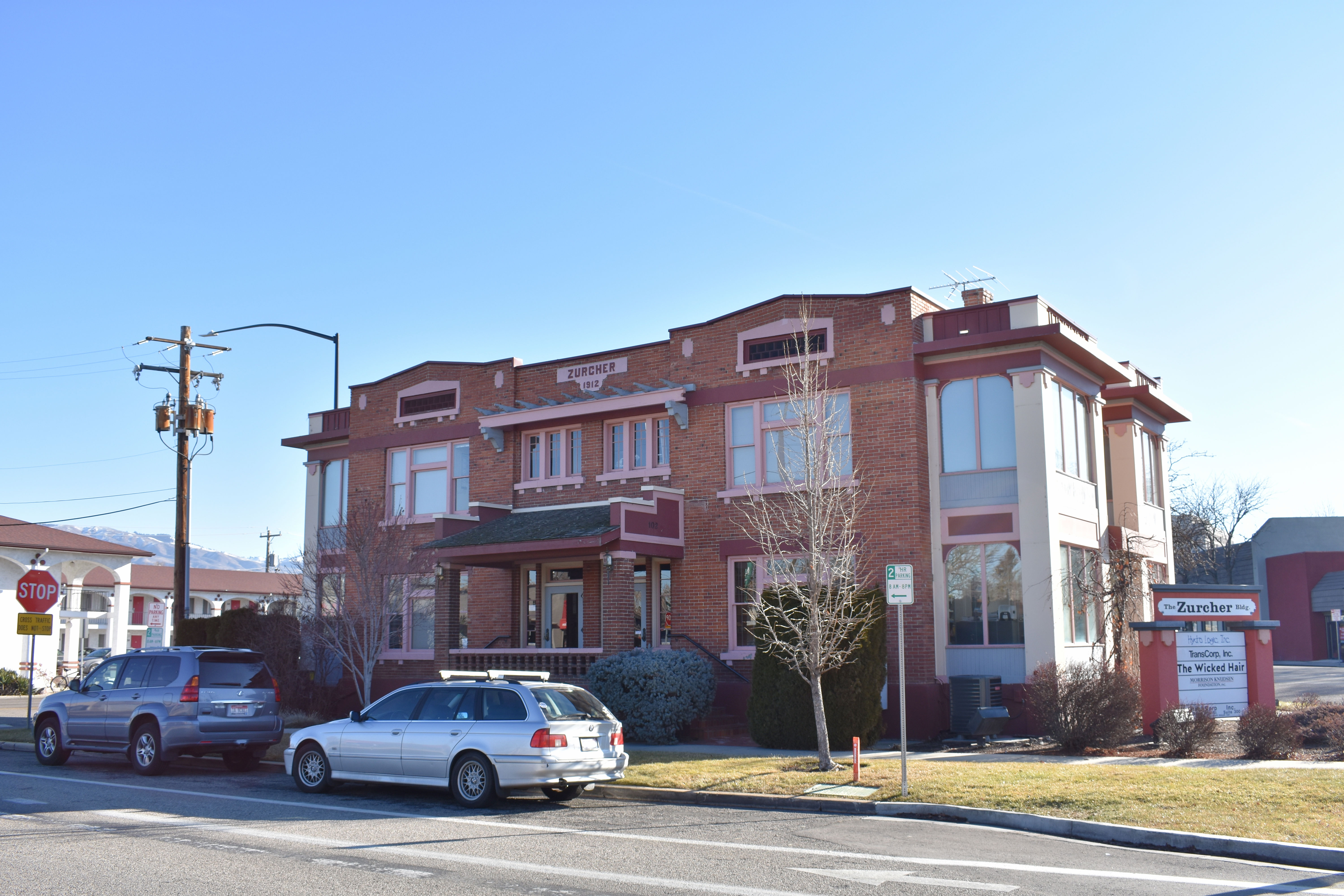
- The Zurcher Apartments in 2019

- Location within Idaho Location within the United States
- Location: 102 S. 17th St., Boise, Idaho
- Coordinates: 43°37′16″N 116°12′48″W
- Area: less than one acre
- Built: 1912
- Architect: Tourtellotte & Hummel
- Architectural style: Classical Revival, Late Victorian
- MPS: Tourtellotte and Hummel Architecture TR
- NRHP reference No.: 82000257
- Added to NRHP: November 17, 1982

The Zurcher Apartments in Boise, Idaho, is a 2-story, Neoclassical building designed by Tourtellotte & Hummel and completed in 1912. It was added to the National Register of Historic Places in 1982.

When it opened, the building featured four apartments, each with three rooms, a bathroom, and a Murphy bed.

Oscar Zurcher was a partner in a marble and granite company located near the Zurcher Apartments, and with his brother Otto Zurcher owned the Zurcher Brothers Grocery.

== See also ==
- National Register of Historic Places listings in Ada County, Idaho
