= W. Scott Neal House =

Historically significant home in Boise

- U.S. National Register of Historic Places
- The W. Scott Neal House in 1980

- Location within Idaho Location within the United States
- Location: 215 E. Jefferson, Boise, Idaho
- Coordinates: 43°36′46″N 116°11′26″W
- Area: less than one acre
- Built: 1897
- Architect: Tourtellotte, John E. & Company; Tourtellotte & Hummel
- Architectural style: Queen Anne
- MPS: Tourtellotte and Hummel Architecture TR
- NRHP reference No.: 82000228
- Added to NRHP: November 17, 1982

The W. Scott Neal House in Boise, Idaho, was a 1 1/2-story Queen Anne cottage designed by John E. Tourtellotte and constructed in 1897. The house was remodeled by Tourtellotte & Co. prior to 1910, and it was remodeled by Tourtellotte & Hummel in 1914. Tourtellotte & Hummel added a garage in 1916. The house was added to the National Register of Historic Places (NRHP) in 1982. After its listing on the NRHP, the house either was moved or demolished in the 1990s to accommodate an expansion of St. Luke's Boise Medical Center.

W. Scott Neal (January 21, 1862—May 25, 1925) was a farm loan and insurance agent who founded the W. Scott Neal Company, later H.E. Neal & Son. He and Emma (Krall) Neal occupied the W. Scott Neal House soon after their marriage in 1897 until 1924, when they moved to Seattle, Washington.

== See also ==
- National Register of Historic Places listings in Ada County, Idaho
