= John Daly House =

- U.S. National Register of Historic Places
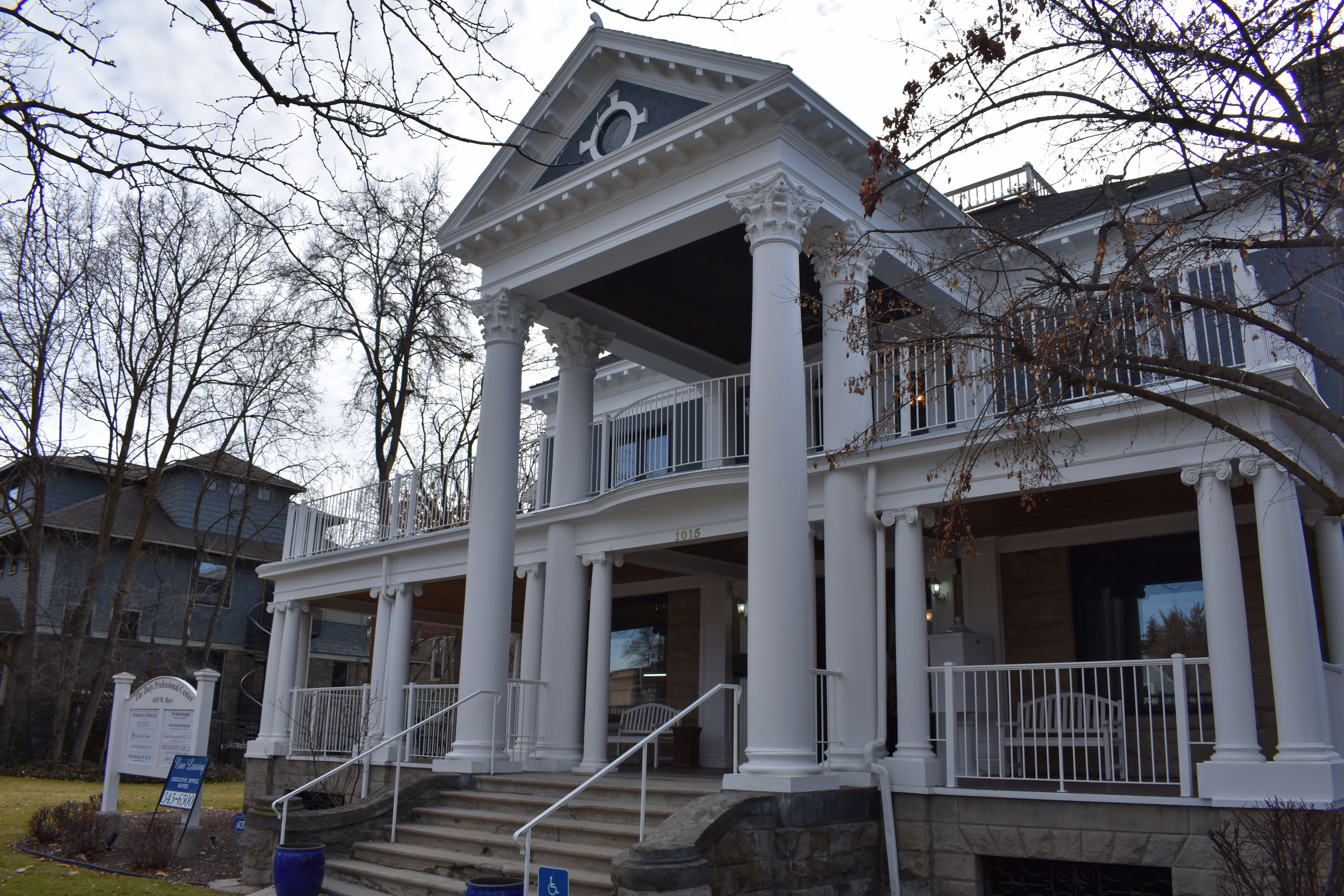
- The John Daly House in 2019

- Location within Idaho Location within the United States
- Location: 1015 W. Hays St., Boise, Idaho
- Coordinates: 43°37′19″N 116°11′57″W
- Area: less than one acre
- Built: 1910
- Architect: Tourtellotte & Hummel
- Architectural style: Colonial Revival, Classical Revival, Georgian Revival
- MPS: Tourtellotte and Hummel Architecture TR
- NRHP reference No.: 82000191
- Added to NRHP: November 17, 1982

The John Daly House in Boise, Idaho, is a 2-story, Colonial Revival house designed by Tourtellotte & Hummel and constructed in 1910. The house was added to the National Register of Historic Places in 1982.

John D. Daly was a prominent banker and real estate owner. He helped to found the Idaho Trust and Savings Bank and the Pacific National Bank (First Security Bank) in Boise, and he had been associated with at least two Oregon banks, the First National Bank in Ontario and the First National Bank in Burns. The Daly Addition, adjacent to the western boundary of the Harrison Boulevard Historic District, was named for John D. Daly.

== See also ==
- National Register of Historic Places listings in Ada County, Idaho
