= Nathan Smith House =

- U.S. National Register of Historic Places
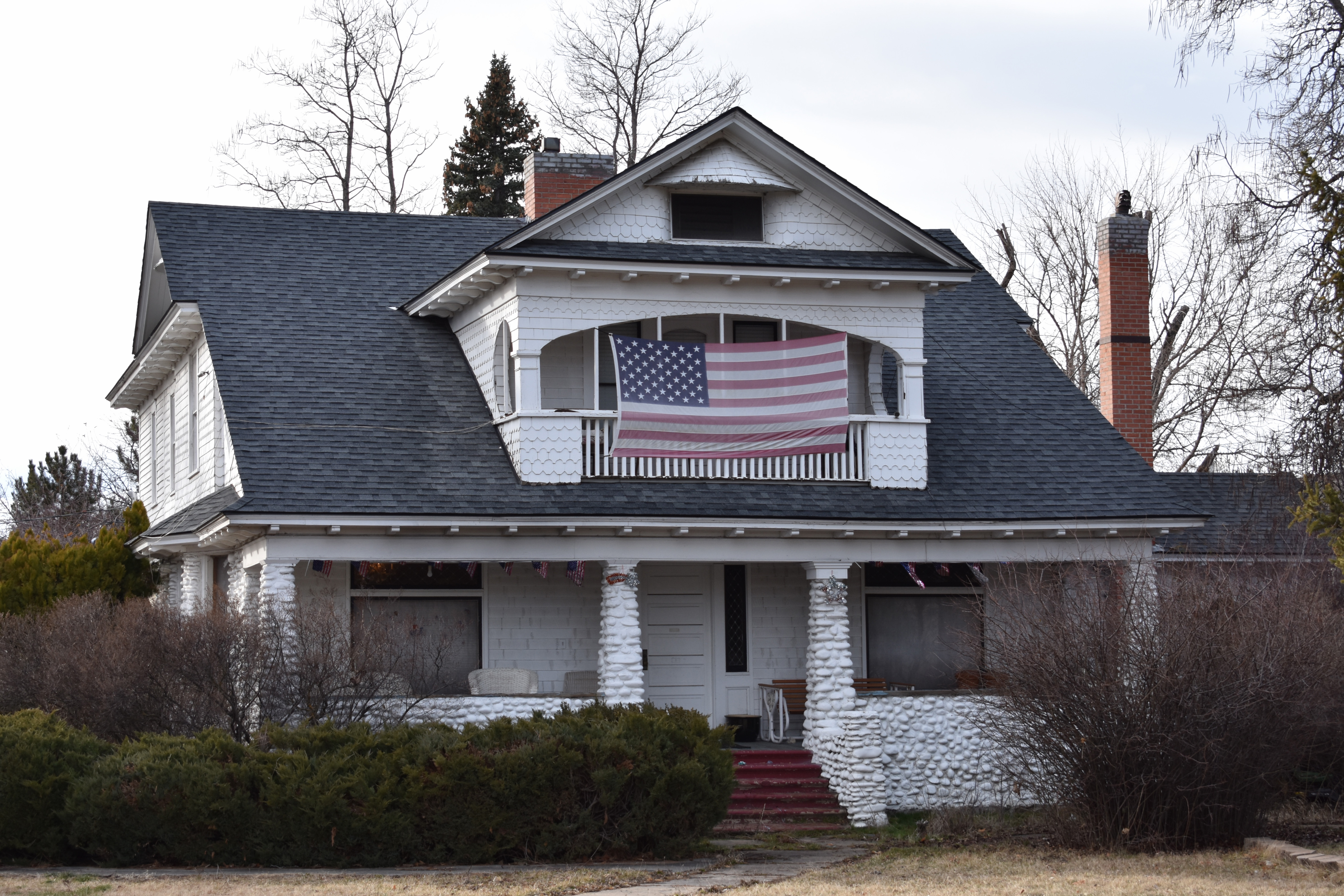
- The Nathan Smith House in 2019

- Location within Idaho Location within the United States
- Location: Broadway and Targhee, Boise, Idaho
- Coordinates: 43°34′56″N 116°11′36″W
- Area: 2.5 acres (1.0 ha)
- Built: 1900
- Architect: Tourtellotte, John & Company
- Architectural style: Shingled Colonial
- MPS: Tourtellotte and Hummel Architecture TR
- NRHP reference No.: 83000258
- Added to NRHP: January 3, 1983

The Nathan Smith House in Boise, Idaho, is a 1 1/2-story Colonial Revival farmhouse designed by John E. Tourtellotte and constructed in 1900. The house features a veneer of cobblestones from the Boise River below shingled upper gables and hooded dimple windows, but its most prominent design element is a front facing basket arch balcony above the porch. The overall design is an early example of a Bungalow, and it influenced later designs in Boise. The house was added to the National Register of Historic Places in 1983.

Originally 8-rooms, the interior featured indoor plumbing and "the patent hard-wall plaster now being tried." The Idaho Statesman described the walls as being as hard as adamant.

Nathan Smith was a farmer in South Boise who owned an orchard of prune trees. After Smith's death in 1907, the house became the property of W.M. Stockton. By 1913 the house had become known as "Fairlawns."

== See also ==
- National Register of Historic Places listings in Ada County, Idaho
