= Wellman Apartments =

Historic building in Boise, Idaho

- U.S. National Register of Historic Places
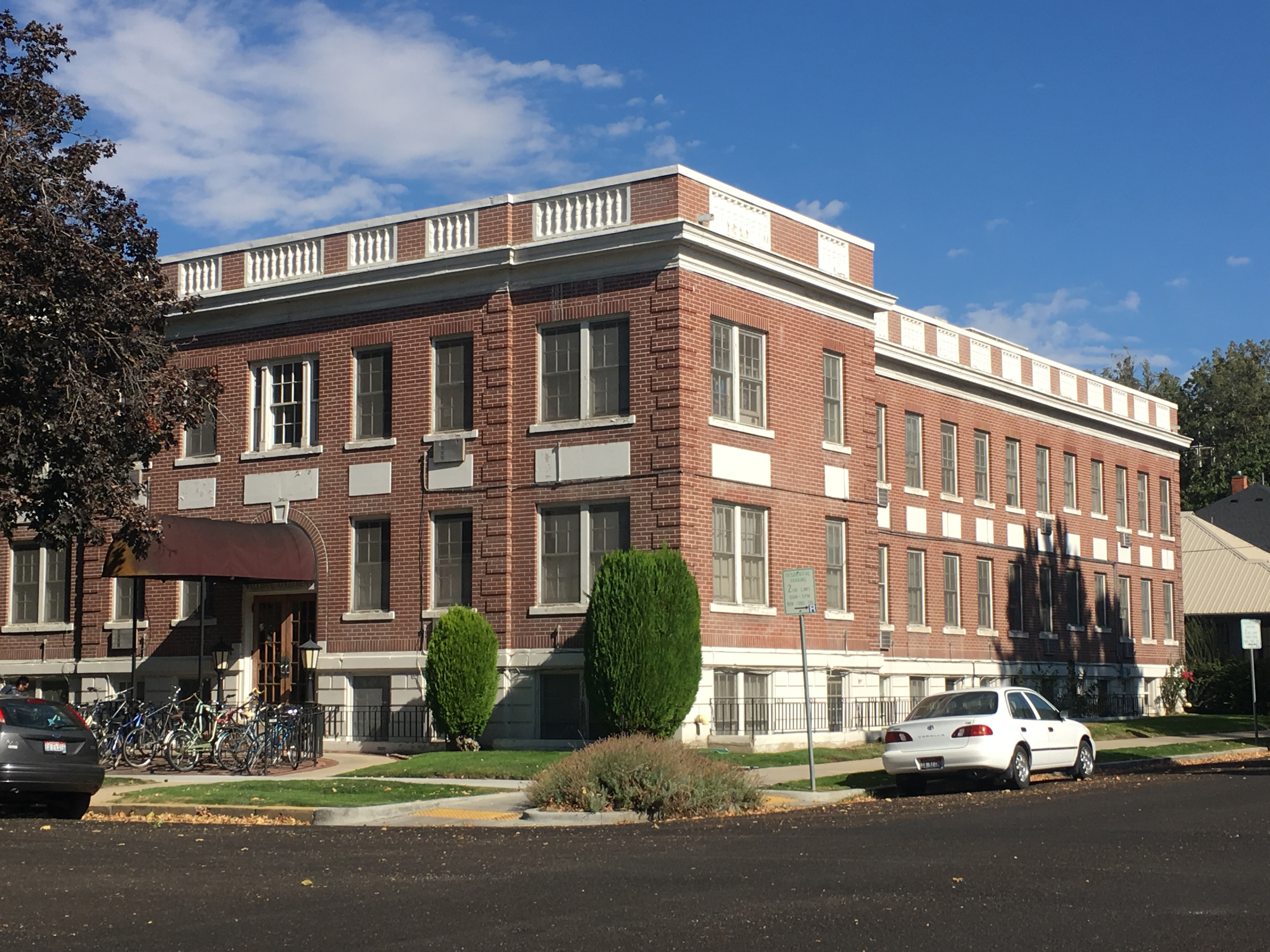
- The Wellman Apartments in 2016

- Location within Idaho Location within the United States
- Location: 5th and Franklin Sts., Boise, Idaho
- Coordinates: 43°37′08″N 116°11′40″W
- Area: less than one acre
- Built: 1929
- Built by: Jordan, J.O.
- Architect: Tourtellotte & Hummel
- Architectural style: Colonial Revival, Georgian Revival
- MPS: Tourtellotte and Hummel Architecture TR
- NRHP reference No.: 82000254
- Added to NRHP: November 17, 1982

The Wellman Apartments in Boise, Idaho, United States, is a 3-story, Georgian Revival building designed by Tourtellotte & Hummel and constructed by local contractor J.O. Jordan in 1929. The building included 16 "efficiency" apartments that featured a Murphy bed, kitchenette, dressing room, and bathroom. Soon after the building opened, it was remodeled, although the exterior remains nearly unaltered. The building was added to the National Register of Historic Places in 1982.

The Wellman Apartments building was constructed and named for Walter and Ora Wellman, Eastern Oregon ranchers, in 1929. The Dollard Agency, a Boise insurance and real estate firm, may have been involved with the project. Soon after the building opened, the Wellmans sold it to Charles Genoway and Joseph Dollard. In 1931, the Dollard Agency renovated the building, including installation of tile in bathrooms and construction of two apartments in the basement garage. In 1932, the owners installed a ventilation system.

== See also ==
- National Register of Historic Places listings in Ada County, Idaho
