= Boulevard Mo-tel =

- U.S. National Register of Historic Places
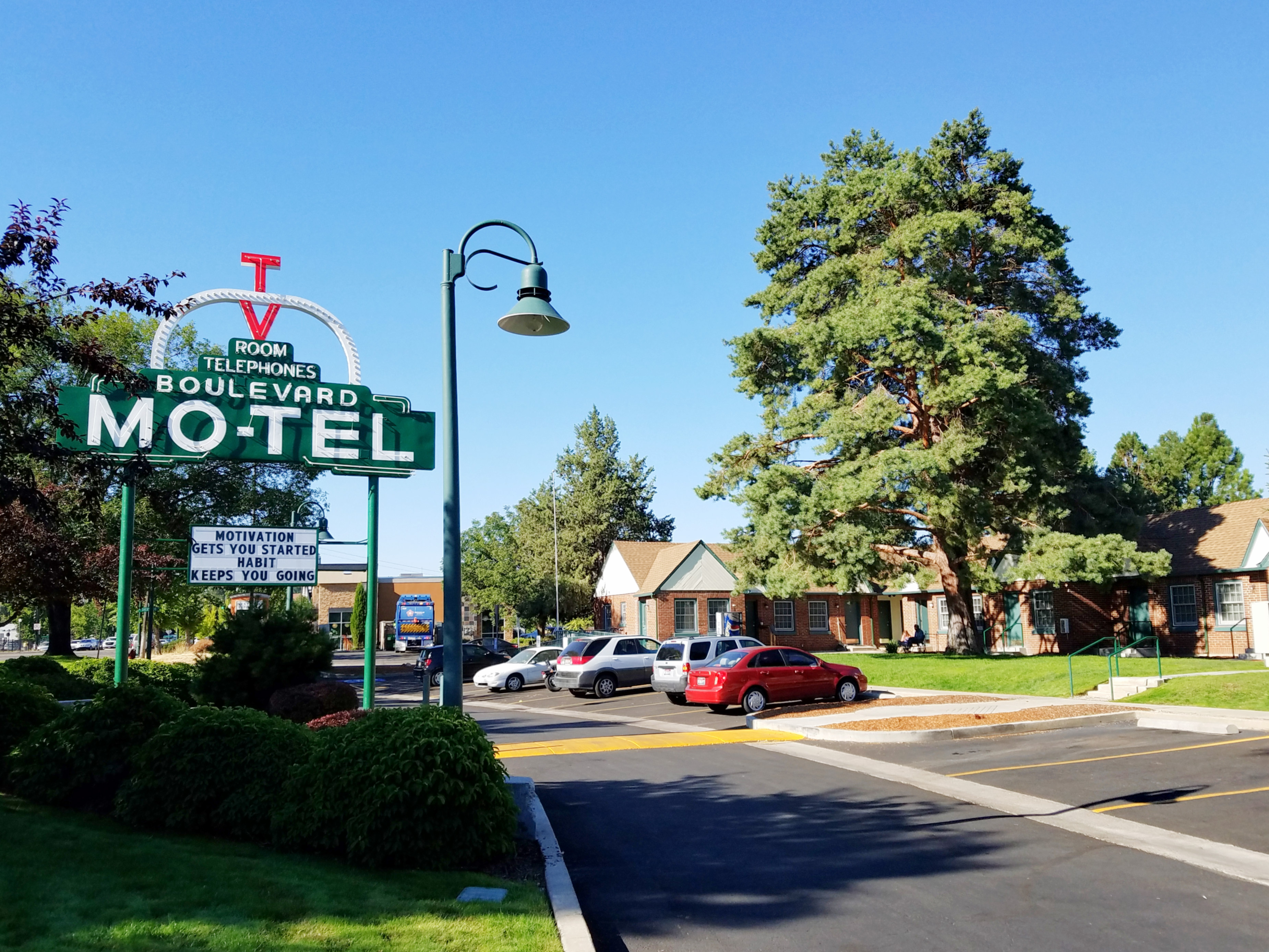
- The Boulevard Mo-Tel in 2018

- Location within Idaho Location within the United States
- Location: 1121 S. Capitol Blvd., Boise, Idaho
- Coordinates: 43°36′25″N 116°12′36″W
- Area: less than one acre
- Built: 1938
- Architectural style: Tudor Revival
- NRHP reference No.: 97001609
- Added to NRHP: January 7, 1998

The Boulevard Mo-Tel, also known as the Capitol Auto Courts, is a Tudor Revival style motel constructed in Boise, Idaho, in 1938.

== History ==
Capitol Boulevard opened in 1931 with construction of Capitol Boulevard Memorial Bridge, and the route was part of the Old Oregon Trail Highway. During the 1930s, drive-ins, motels, and gasoline stations were constructed on Capitol Boulevard, and in 1938 Capitol Auto Courts opened on the Boulevard. A postcard printed later indicates that the motel featured “21 nicely furnished units with full-tile baths. Central heating. Room telephones and radios. Near city center... TV and Refrigerated Air Conditioning.”

Ben H. Ellis owned the motel from 1938 until 1943, and the motel name was changed in the 1940s to Boulevard Mo-Tel. In 1994 the motel became the property of Boise Housing and Community Development, although 1997 is given by the city of Boise as the year of acquisition.
