= Star Camp (Star, Idaho) =

- U.S. National Register of Historic Places
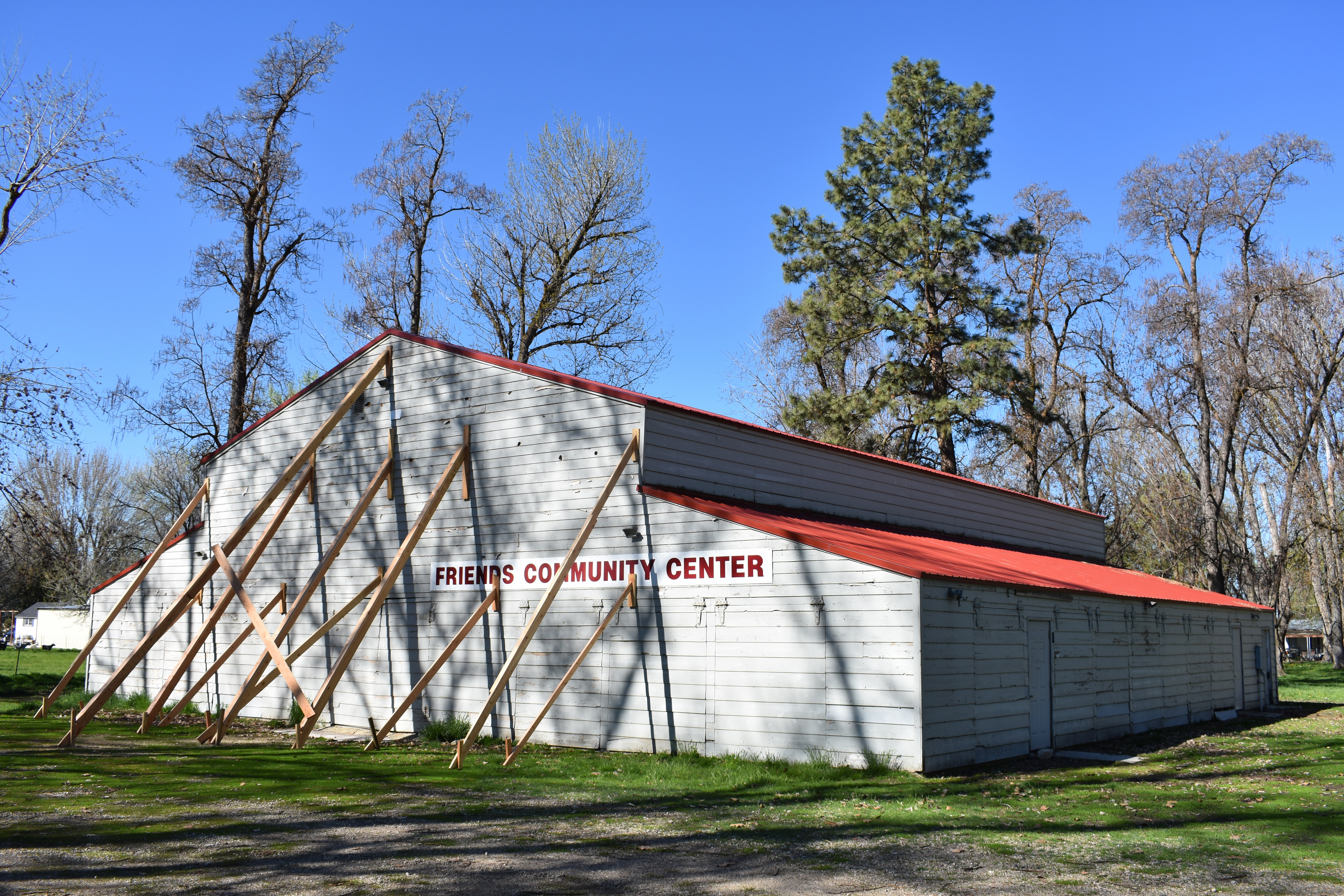
- Friends Community Center in 2019

- Location within Idaho Location within the United States
- Location: N. Star Rd. and W. 3rd St., Star, Idaho
- Coordinates: 43°41′41″N 116°29′37″W
- Area: 5 acres (2.0 ha)
- Built: 1949
- Architectural style: Monitor-style barn
- NRHP reference No.: 05000344
- Added to NRHP: April 27, 2005

Star Camp in Star, Idaho, also known as Friends Community Center, is a meeting facility and tabernacle operated by Quakers and constructed in 1949. The facility is part of a 5-acre parcel organized as a camp meeting area in 1941.

The Star Friends Church was constructed in 1912 near the northeast corner of the grounds, and from 1935 to 1985 a 10-day annual camp meeting occurred on the site. In 1941 Fred Harris sold his 5-acre parcel of adjacent land to the Idaho State Holiness Association, sponsors of the camp meeting. Harris was president of the association in the 1940s and 1950s, and he was credited with development of the camp and tabernacle. Eleven buildings were constructed on the site, including a 5200 square foot tabernacle. All but the tabernacle were demolished prior to 2004. The post and beam tabernacle is similar to a monitor style barn, and after 1985 it was repurposed as a community center.

Star Camp was added to the National Register of Historic Places in 2005.
