= Eagle Adventist Schoolhouse =

Historic building in Eagle, Idaho, US

- U.S. National Register of Historic Places
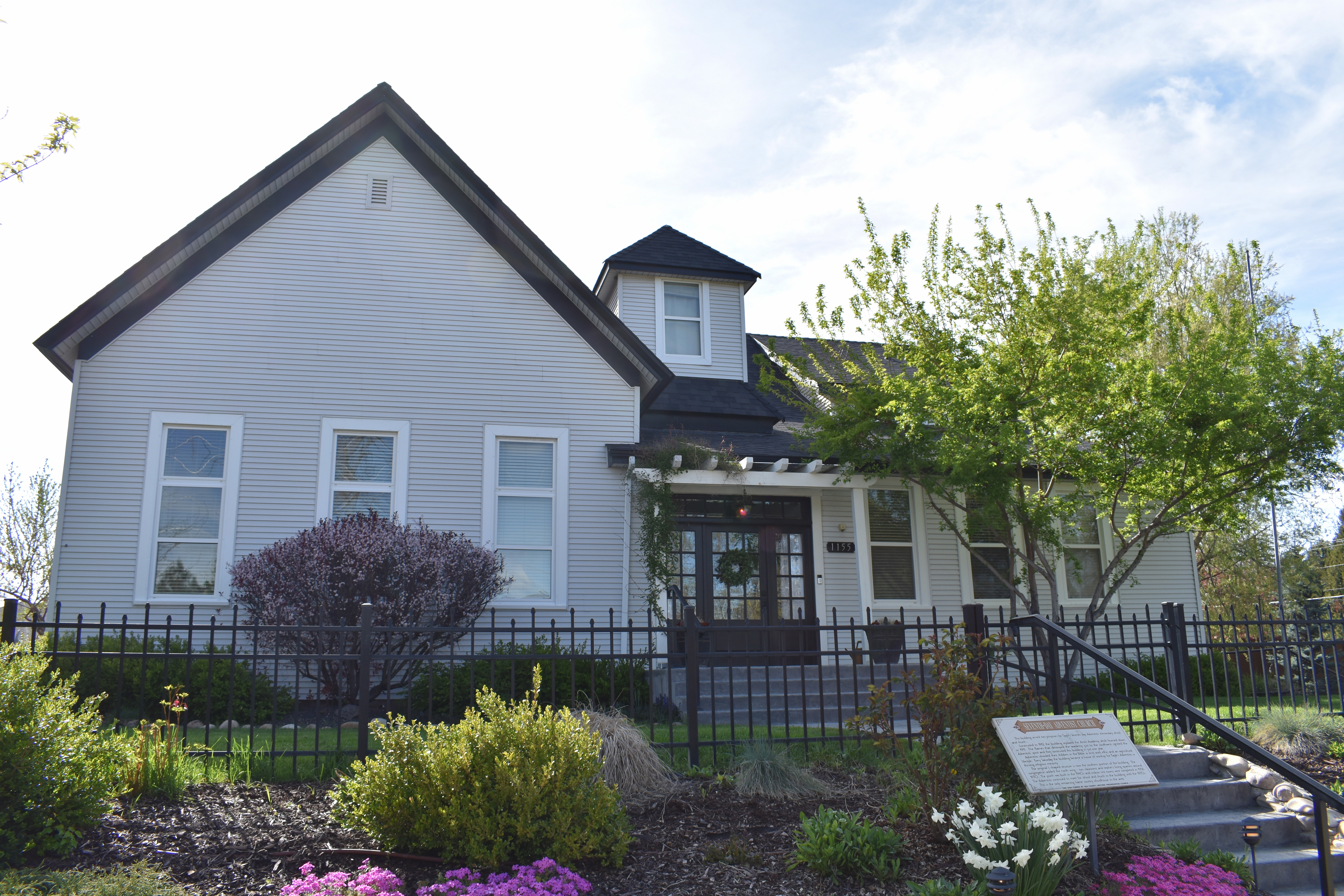
- The Eagle Adventist Schoolhouse in 2019

- Location within Idaho Location within the United States
- Location: 1155 N Ballantyne Ln
- Nearest city: Eagle, Idaho
- Coordinates: 43.7059711°N 116.3791321°W
- Area: less than one acre
- Built: 1912
- NRHP reference No.: 80001288
- Added to NRHP: August 18, 1980

The Eagle Adventist Schoolhouse near Eagle, Idaho, is a 1 1/2-story former school and church constructed in 1912. The wood frame, L-shape building features a small belfry above and behind the main entrance on North Ballantyne Lane. Clapboard siding covers exterior walls, and the building is free of ornamentation. The schoolhouse was added to the National Register of Historic Places in 1980.

The schoolhouse was constructed at the former site of the Ames Academy, a Seventh Day Adventist school and church, constructed in 1908 and destroyed by a fire in 1911. At the time of the fire, Ames had 40 students, including 15 students boarding at the school. Ames was relatively self contained, with its own water and electric utilities. An Adventist college had been planned for the site until the fire.
