= Ustick School =

Historic building in Boise, Idaho

- U.S. National Register of Historic Places
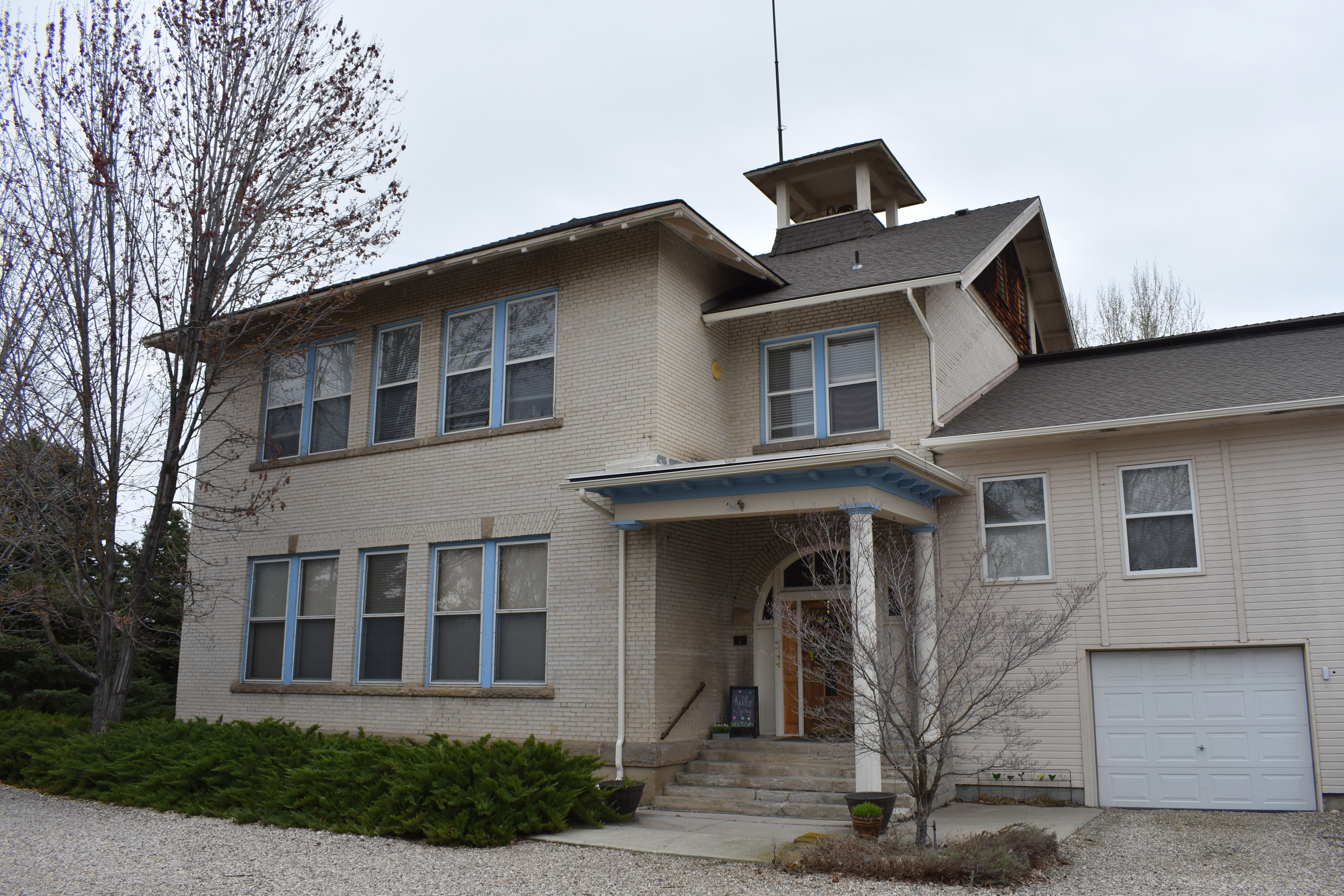
- Ustick School in 2019

- Location within Idaho Location within the United States
- Location: 2971 Mumbarto St., Boise, Idaho
- Coordinates: 43°37′54″N 116°19′21″W
- Area: less than one acre
- Built: 1909
- Architectural style: Colonial Revival
- NRHP reference No.: 82000250
- Added to NRHP: October 29, 1982

Ustick School in Boise, Idaho, is a 2-story, 4-room Colonial Revival schoolhouse constructed in 1909 in the former town of Ustick. The school was added to the National Register of Historic Places (NRHP) in 1982.

== History ==
In 1907 Dr. Harlan P. Ustick platted the farming community of Ustick on his property, six miles west of Boise. The Ustick post office was established in 1908 and closed in 1958.

Dr. Ustick helped to organize the Boise Valley Railroad, later the Boise Interurban Railway, a trolley line that included a station at Ustick, and Dr. Ustick briefly served as president of the company.

The Ustick School District, also known as District #37, was formed in 1909 from parts of other districts, and in that year the Ustick community approved construction of Ustick School by a vote of 72 to 3. By 1910 the schoolhouse was considered "one of the best new school buildings in the county."

A gymnasium was added to the building after 1911, and it was demolished after 1967 and before the school's listing on the NRHP in 1982. The school was closed in the mid 1950s, but the gymnasium was in use as a cannery for Allen's Custom Cannery of Fruitland in the 1960s. The cannery continued to operate at the school in the 1970s.

By 1999 Ustick School had been converted into a house, and by 2008 the building had been divided for apartments.
