= Dry Creek Rockshelter =

Archeological site near Boise, Idaho

- U.S. National Register of Historic Places
- Location within Idaho Location within the United States
- Nearest city: Boise, Idaho
- Coordinates: 43°37′N 116°12′W
- Area: less than one acre
- NRHP reference No.: 910001719
- Added to NRHP: November 22, 1991

Dry Creek Rockshelter near Boise, Idaho, is an archaeological site showing periodic use over approximately 3000 years. The site is located under a sandstone overhang, roughly 21 metres (69 ft) wide by 4 metres (13 ft) deep. The rockshelter is unique in that no other local sandstone outcrops are large enough for human habitation. The site was added to the National Register of Historic Places in 1991, and the site address is listed as restricted.

== Excavation ==
The site was excavated under the direction of Gary S. Webster (Boise State University) in 1978, revealing 13 stratigraphic levels, and all but three levels contained cultural artifacts. Seventeen hearths and two burials were uncovered at the site, and excavation found among other tools 125 projectile points. Obsidian materials were found in higher number than basalt and other stone materials, and the site included bone and antler tools and fragments. Radiocarbon dating of cultural material ranged from 3530 years BP to 1410 BP, and researchers have associated the site either with Great Basin Desert Cultures or with Columbia Plateau cultures.
