= William Whitehead House =

Historic building in Boise, Idaho

- U.S. National Register of Historic Places
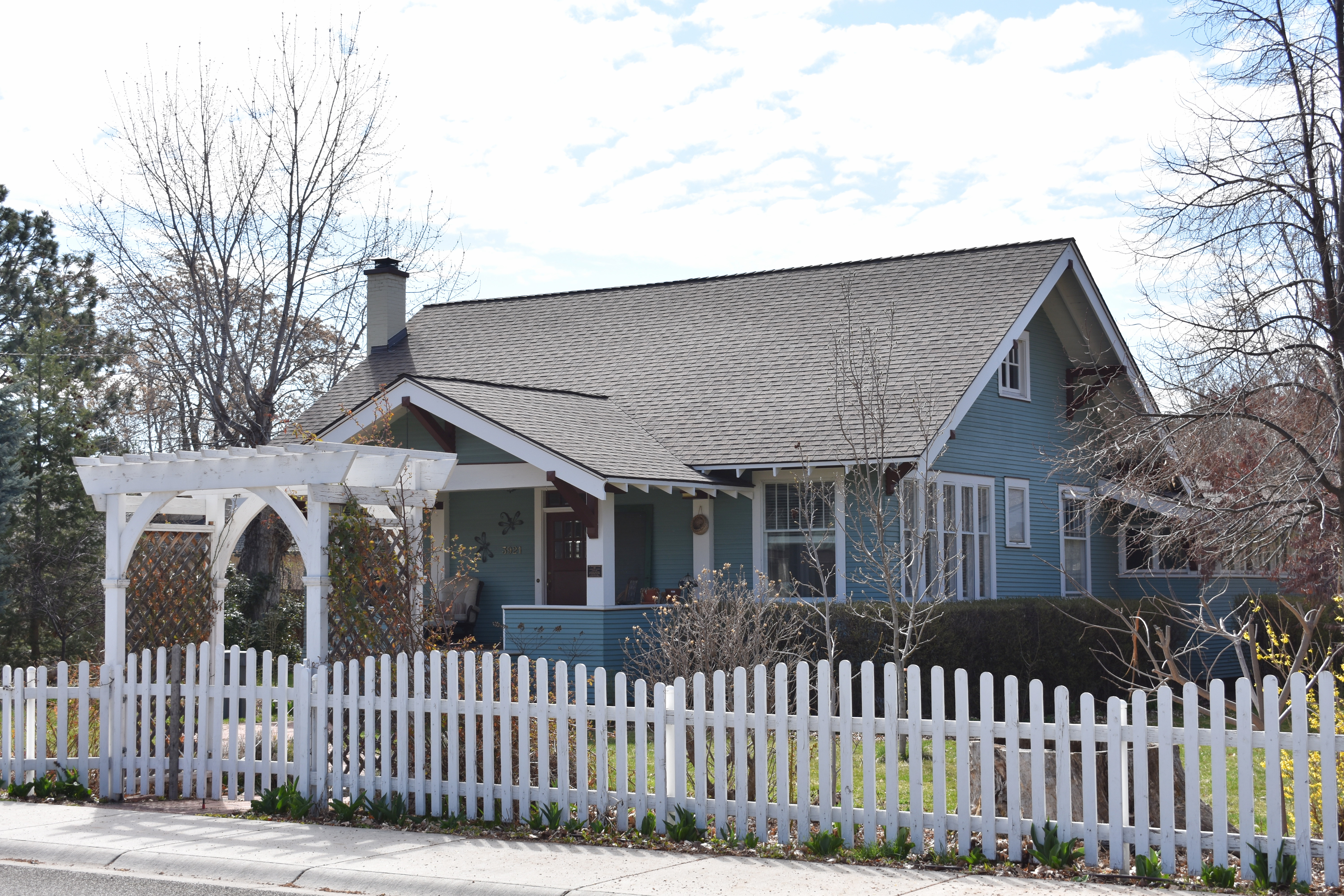
- The William Whitehead House in 2019

- Location within Idaho Location within the United States
- Location: 3921 W. Catalpa Dr., Boise, Idaho
- Coordinates: 43.611667°N 116.194444°W
- Area: 1.5 acres (0.61 ha)
- Built: 1910
- Architect: Tourtellotte & Hummel
- Architectural style: Bungalow/craftsman
- MPS: Tourtellotte and Hummel Architecture TR
- NRHP reference No.: 16000176
- Added to NRHP: April 19, 2016

The William Whitehead House, also known as Hillview Ranch, in Boise, Idaho, is a 1 1/2-story Bungalow designed by Tourtellotte & Hummel and constructed in 1910. The house includes a cross gable, overhanging roof supported by decorative knee braces. Rafter tails are exposed under the eaves, and verge boards are decorated with half-moon cutouts. The house was added to the National Register of Historic Places (NRHP) in 2016.

Pharmacist William S. Whitehead arrived in Boise in 1889, and the Whitehead & Boomer Pharmacy was located in that year in a building owned by John Lemp. Whitehead purchased a 40-acre parcel and operated a fruit orchard on the Hillview Ranch property, although the current site is 1.5 acres.
