= Aiken's Hotel =

Historic building in Eagle, Idaho

- U.S. National Register of Historic Places
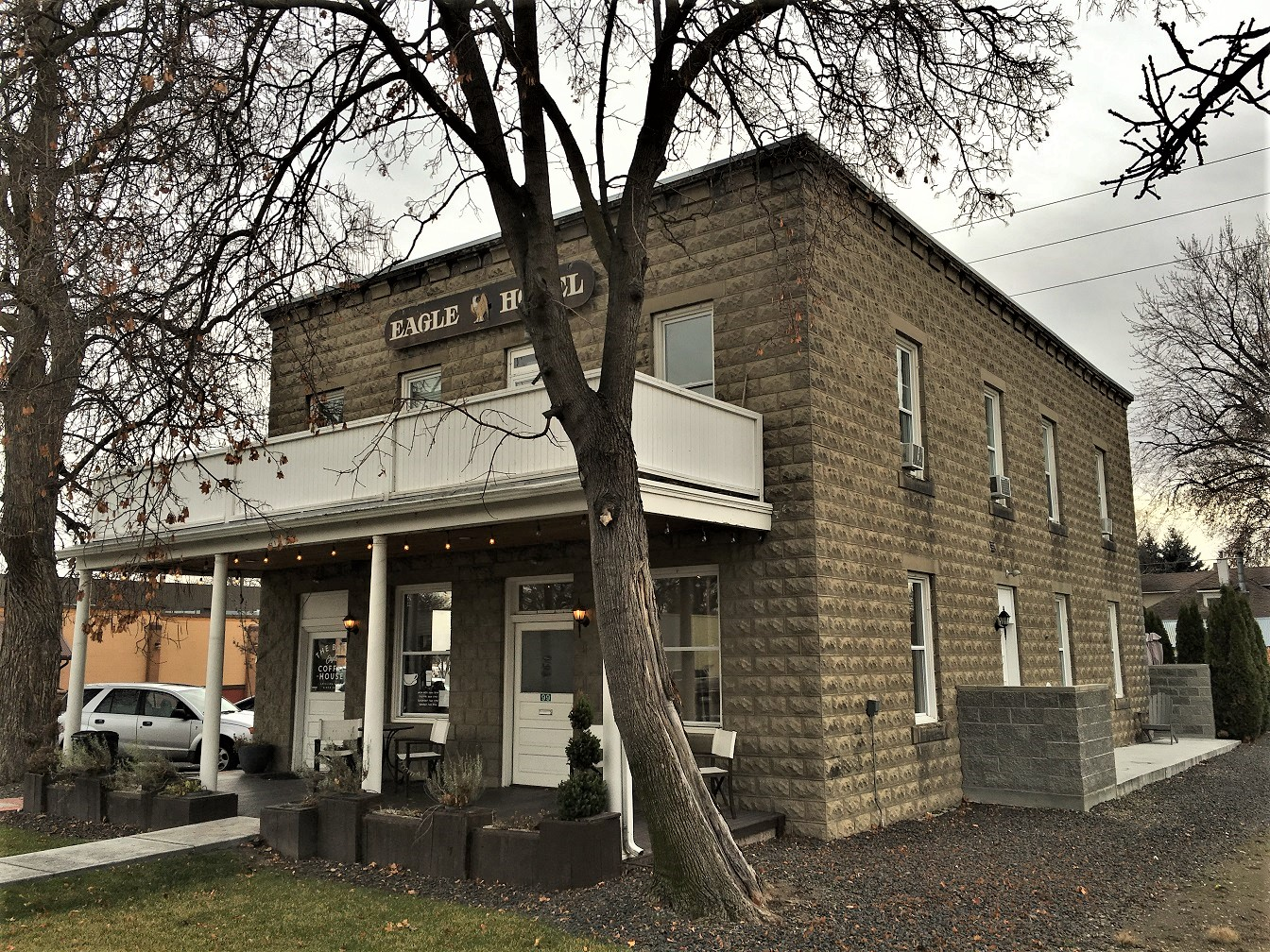
- The Aiken's Hotel in 2017

- Location within Idaho Location within the United States
- Location: 99 E. State St., Eagle, Idaho
- Coordinates: 43°41′42″N 116°21′08″W
- Area: less than one acre
- Built: 1910
- NRHP reference No.: 82000177
- Added to NRHP: October 29, 1982

Aiken's Hotel in Eagle, Idaho, also known as Eagle Hotel, is a two-story concrete block building constructed in 1910. The hotel features design elements of Colonial Revival architecture, but it has been considered an Italianate structure. The hotel was designed with 16 rooms large enough to accommodate residential customers. It was added to the United States National Register of Historic Places in 1982.

Thomas H. Aiken, also known as Thomas H. Aikens, arrived in Idaho Territory in 1871. His brother, Samuel D. Aiken, owner of the Green Meadow Ranch, arrived in 1862. In 1877, Thomas Aiken secured water rights to property on Eagle Island. By the 1890s, Aiken promoted and finally secured construction of a bridge across the Boise River, and he increased his land holdings on Eagle Island. Aiken platted the town of Eagle in 1904.
