= Halbert F. and Grace Neal House =

- U.S. National Register of Historic Places
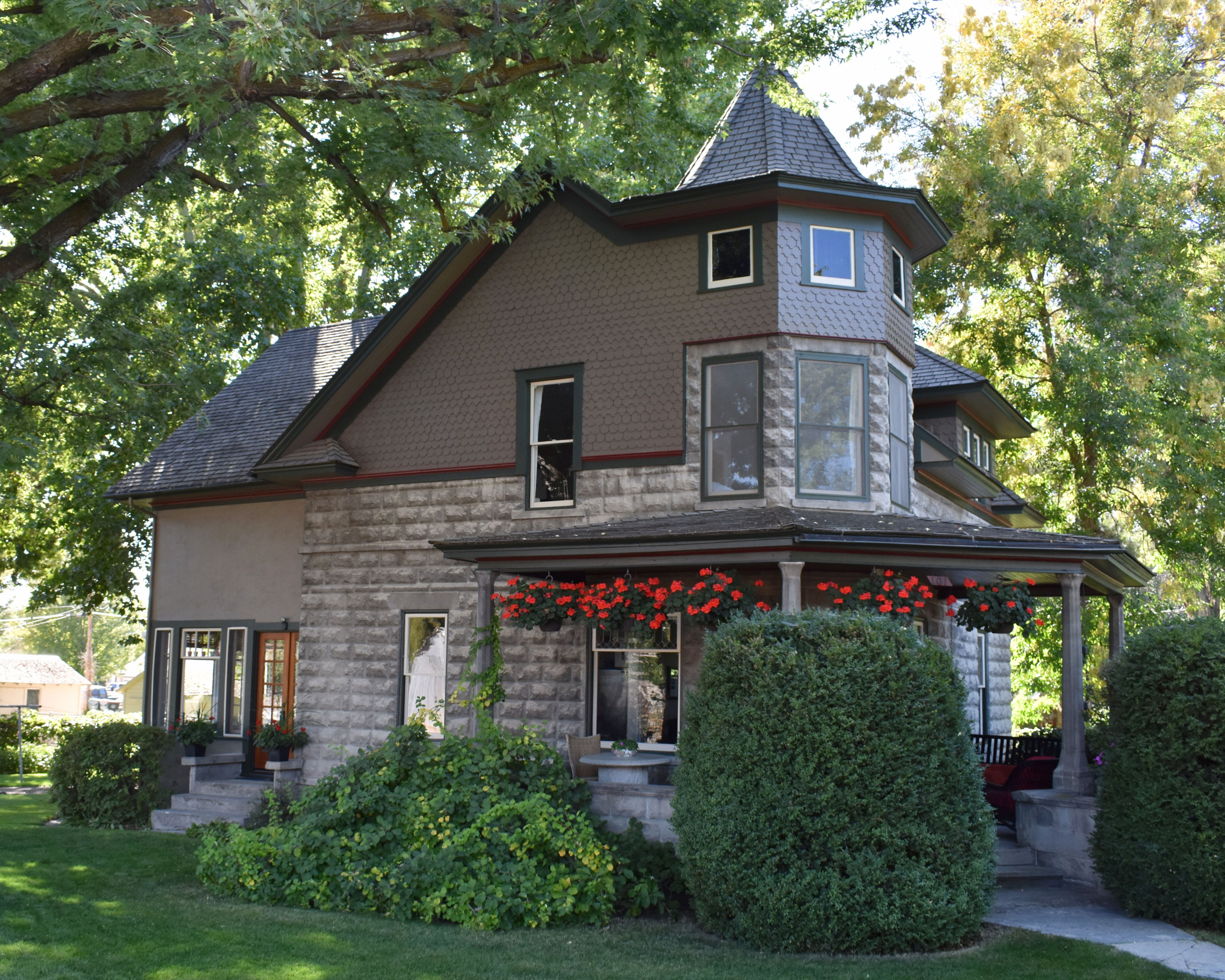
- The Neal House in 2018

- Location within Idaho Location within the United States
- Location: 101 W Pine St. Meridian, Idaho
- Coordinates: 43°36′43″N 116°23′34″W
- Area: less than one acre
- Built: 1905
- Architect: Ed Hartman
- Architectural style: Queen Anne
- NRHP reference No.: 82000227
- Added to NRHP: October 19, 1982

The Halbert F. and Grace Neal House is a Queen Anne, cast concrete block house designed and constructed in 1905 by local contractor Ed Hartman in Meridian, Idaho, USA. The house was listed on the National Register of Historic Places October 19, 1982.

Halbert F. Neal graduated from medical school in Nebraska in 1904, and during his first year in Meridian he and his wife, Grace (Andrews) Neal, operated a pharmacy. Dr. Neal was Meridian's only resident physician for 28 years, and he served on the local school board.
