= Tolleth House =

House in Meridian, Idaho

- U.S. National Register of Historic Places
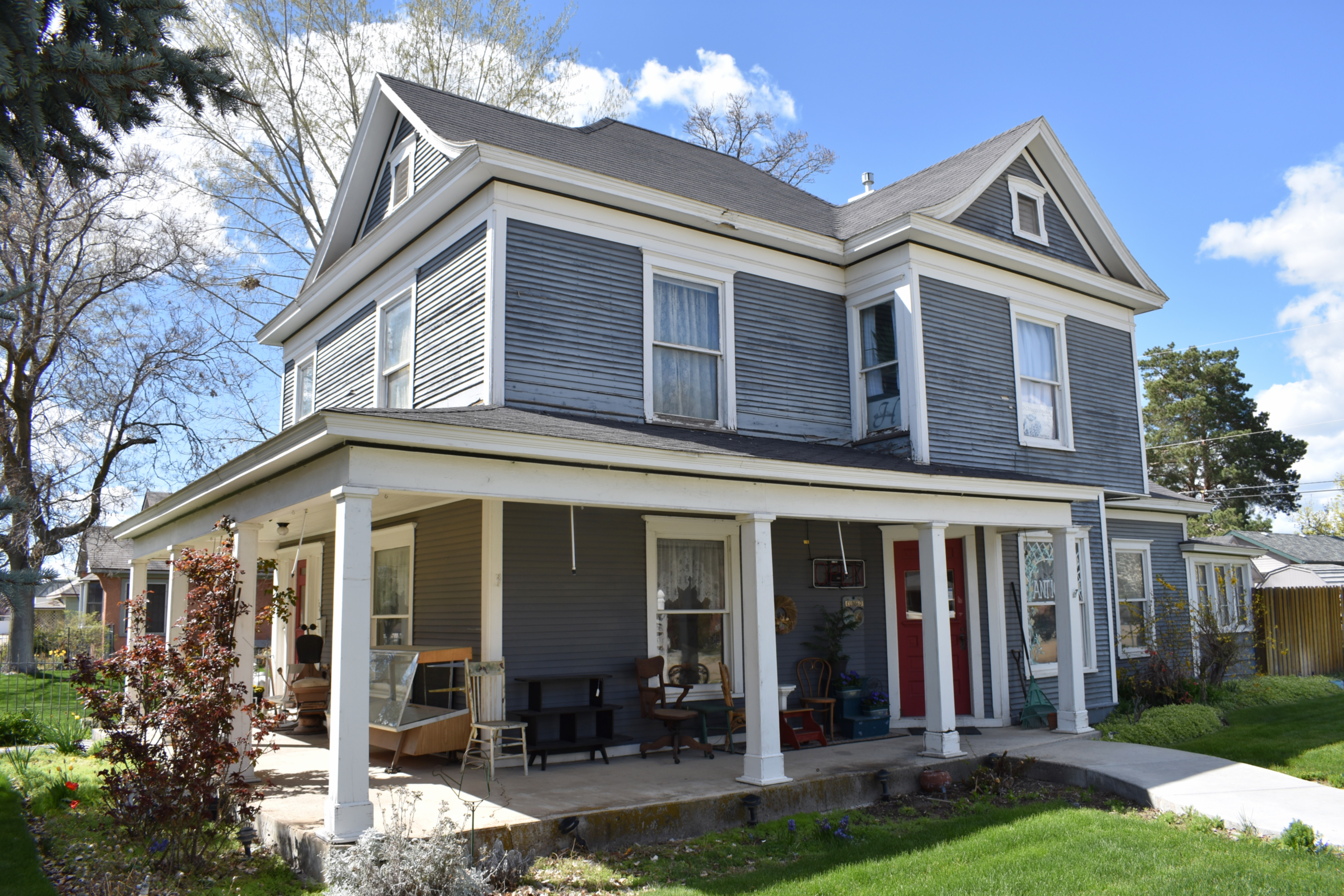
- The Tolleth House in 2019

- Location within Idaho Location within the United States
- Location: 134 E. State Ave., Meridian, Idaho
- Coordinates: 43°36′47″N 116°23′23″W
- Area: less than one acre
- Built: 1907
- Architectural style: Queen Anne
- NRHP reference No.: 96001506
- Added to NRHP: December 20, 1996

The Tolleth House in Meridian, Idaho, is a 2-story Queen Anne house constructed in 1907. The house features a wrap around porch and narrow shiplap siding, and the irregular plan includes 13 exterior corners. It was added to the National Register of Historic Places in 1996.

Harry and Della Tolleth were original residents of the house. Harry Tolleth was a partner in a mercantile and grocery company, Champlin-Tolleth, headquartered in Meridian. By 1913 Tolleth owned the Tolleth Mercantile Co., later Tolleth's Grocery. Harry Tolleth lived at the house until his death in 1936. Della Tolleth remained at the house until her death in 1975.

After the Tolleths, Gwen Alger purchased the house and became its second owner. Alger opened an antique shop at the house.

Researchers for the City of Meridian found evidence that the Tolleth House was a Sears Catalog Home constructed from mail order plans sold by Sears, Roebuck and Company in their 1905 catalog. Sears included catalog homes beginning with its 1908 catalog, but the company offered "full color and texture wallpaper samples" in its 1905 catalog, and further research is needed on the 1907 Tolleth House.
