= Charles and Martha Villeneuve House =

Historic house in Idaho, United States

- U.S. National Register of Historic Places
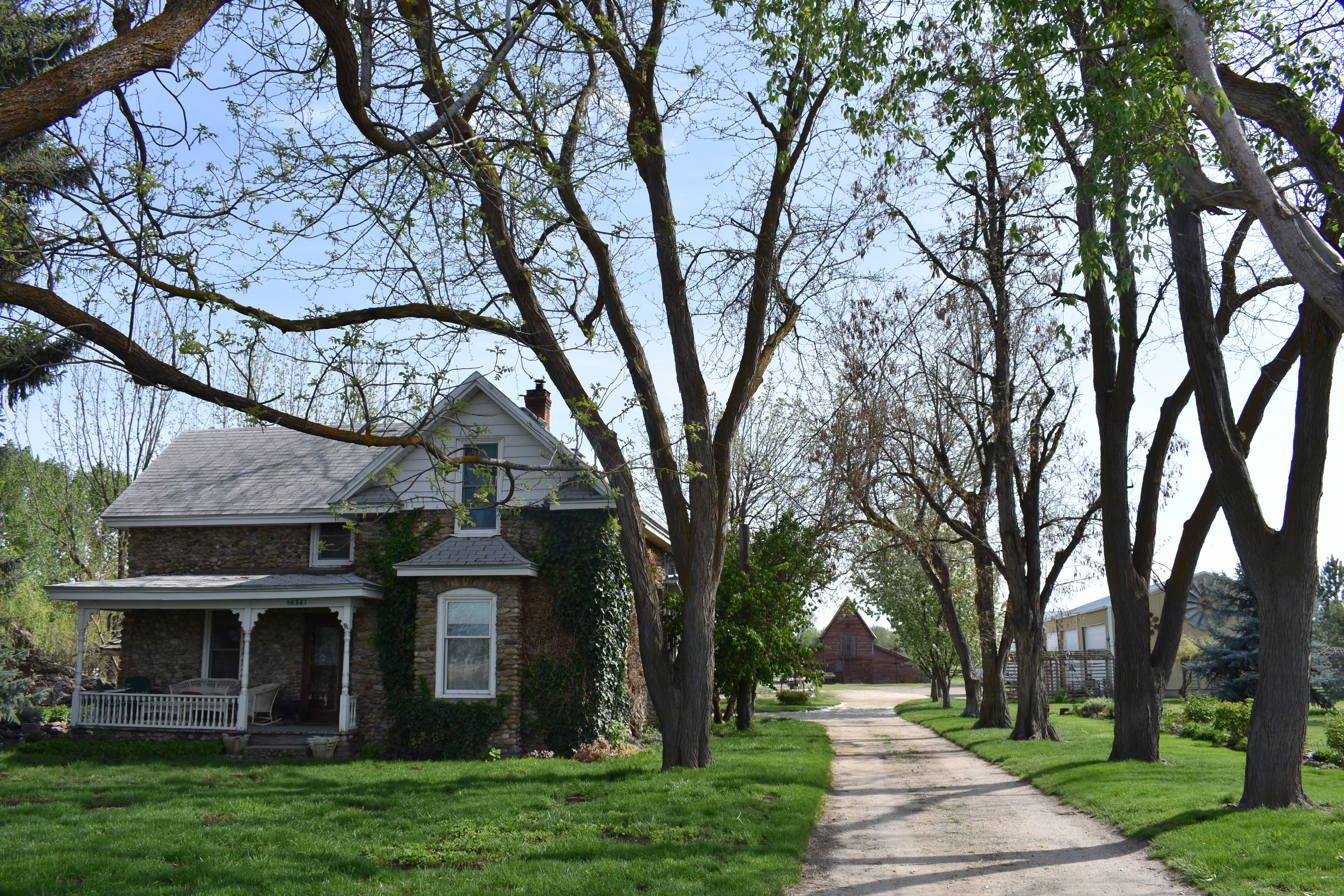
- The Charles and Martha Villeneuve House in 2019

- Location within Idaho Location within the United States
- Location: 7575 Moon Valley Rd., Eagle, Idaho
- Coordinates: 43°41′20″N 116°26′51″W
- Area: 0.3 acres (0.12 ha)
- Built: 1881
- Architectural style: Queen Anne
- NRHP reference No.: 90001731
- Added to NRHP: November 13, 1990

The Charles and Martha Villeneuve House, also known as the Herridge House, near Eagle, Idaho, is a 1 1/2-story Queen Anne house constructed of cobblestones from the Boise River in 1881. Ground floor stone walls are 12-14 inches thick, and the upper half story construction is wood frame with front and left side gables. A 1961 addition at the rear of the house is not visible from Moon Valley Road. The house was added to the National Register of Historic Places in 1990.

== Charles and Martha Villeneuve ==
Charles Villeneuve (born 1836, died March 11, 1910) was an 1860 pioneer and mining prospector whose arrival in the Boise Basin predated the designation of Idaho Territory in 1863. Villeneuve homesteaded 140 acres in the Boise Valley near Eagle in 1872. He married Martha Anderson, an 1876 pioneer, at his home in 1877.

Villeneuve had been a stone cutter, and he may have constructed the Charles and Martha Villeneuve House himself in 1881. He sold the house and property in 1886 to William Eddy, and the Villeneuves moved to Boise City.

Charles Villeneuve later worked as a custodian at the Ada County Courthouse. He also served briefly as the courthouse bailiff. In 1910 he was struck and killed by a trolley on the Boise Interurban Railway.

Martha Villeneuve died in Boise in 1935.

== History of ownership ==
After the house was sold to William Eddy in 1886, it was purchased by A.C. Guyer and A.S. Guyer in 1887. It was owned by Phelps Everett in 1888, and Everett operated a freight station on the property. His son, Elza Everett, owned the house from 1905 until 1909, when he sold it to Ernest and Daisy Pulliam. By that time the property had been reduced from 140 acres to 17 acres. Henry and Grace Eltinge acquired the house in 1917. In 1919 Martin J. Peterson and his son, M. Raymond Peterson, owned the house, and the Petersons added a separate garage and a barn to the property. Glen and Melvina Suiter owned the house from 1961 until 1965, and they are responsible for the rear addition, including a kitchen, a utility room, and a bathroom. Roy and Francis Herridge purchased the house in 1965.
