= Fred Reiger Houses =

- U.S. National Register of Historic Places
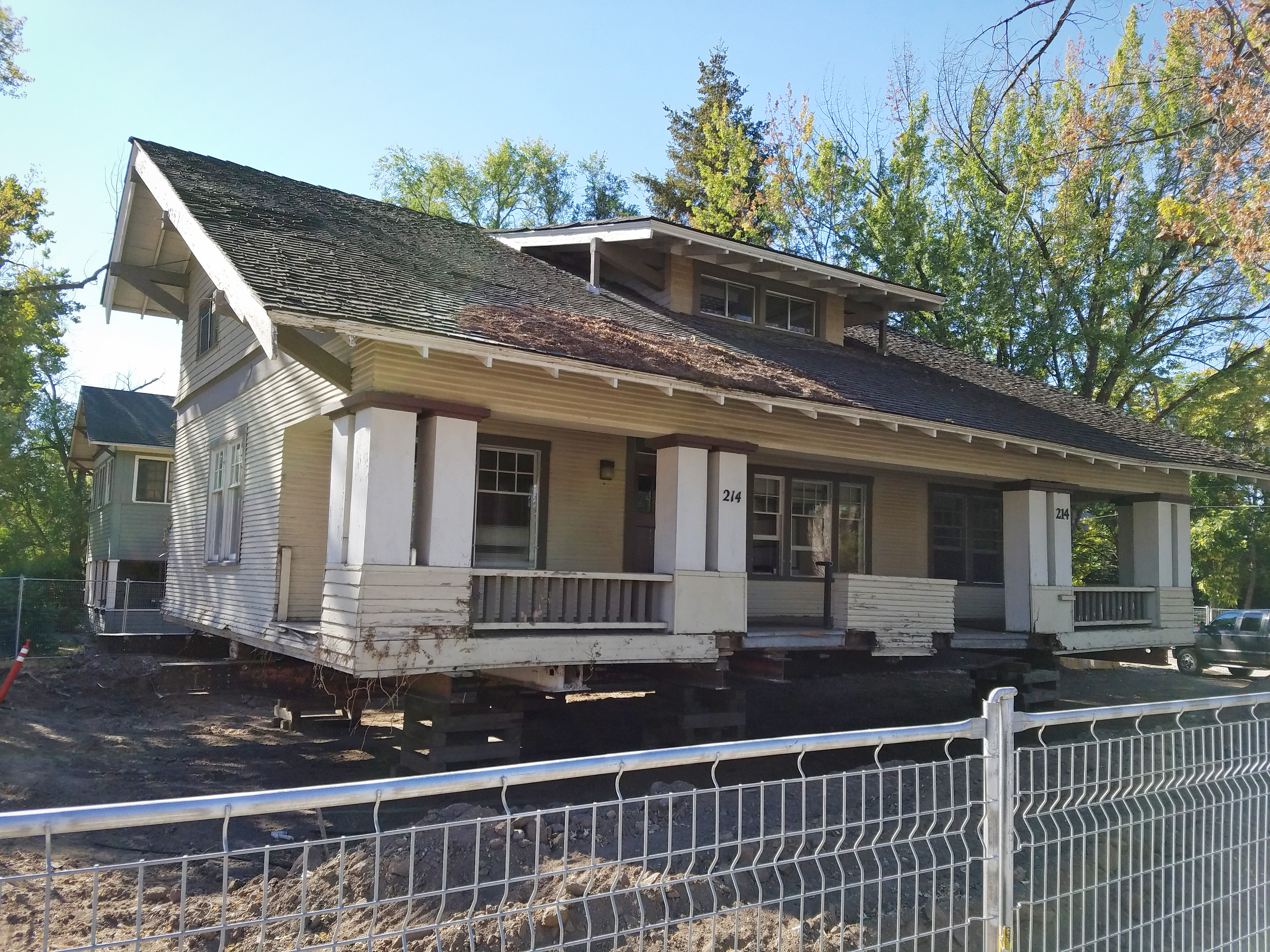
- The Fred Reiger House in 2018

- Location within Idaho Location within the United States
- Location: 214 and 216-18 E. Jefferson St., Boise, Idaho
- Coordinates: 43°37′16″N 116°11′23″W
- Area: less than one acre
- Built: 1910
- Built by: Lemon & Doolittle
- Architect: Tourtellotte, John E. & Company
- Architectural style: Bungalow/craftsman
- MPS: Tourtellotte and Hummel Architecture TR
- NRHP reference No.: 82000235
- Added to NRHP: November 17, 1982

The Fred Reiger Houses in Boise, Idaho, are two bungalows designed by Tourtellotte & Hummel and constructed by contractors Lemon & Doolittle in 1910. House A includes an inset, cross facade porch with large, square piers supporting the forward extending roof. The roof extends well beyond the side facing gables and features a long, low dormer above the porch. House B features a cross facade porch with battered piers, a front facing gable, and raked eaves supported by figure four brackets. The houses were added to the National Register of Historic Places in 1982.

== Fred Reiger ==
Fred J. Reiger, also spelled Rieger, was a resident of Salt Lake City, and he may never have lived in either of the Fred Reiger Houses. He operated a mercantile business with his brother, Erwin A. Rieger, in Salt Lake City until 1902 when Erwin Rieger moved to Ontario and established the Oregon Forwarding Company, later Beckman & Rieger. Fred Rieger remained in Salt Lake City to become a whiskey and cigar distributor, working under the business name of Rieger & Lindley, later Fred J. Rieger & Co. Both the Oregon Forwarding Company and Rieger & Lindley were owned and managed by Friedrich J. Kiesel, a wealthy Utah business owner and politician, and Kiesel may have been a relative of the Riegers.

The Riegers' mother, Marie (Kiesel) Rieger, occupied house B, the smaller of the Fred Reiger Houses. When Fred Rieger died in 1919, his will provided that Marie Rieger receive both houses. Erwin Rieger administered Fred Rieger's estate, valued at over $208,000.

The Fred Reiger Houses were moved in 2018 to allow for expansion of St. Luke's Boise Medical Center.
