= MacMillan Chapel =

Historic building near Nampa, Idaho, US

- U.S. National Register of Historic Places
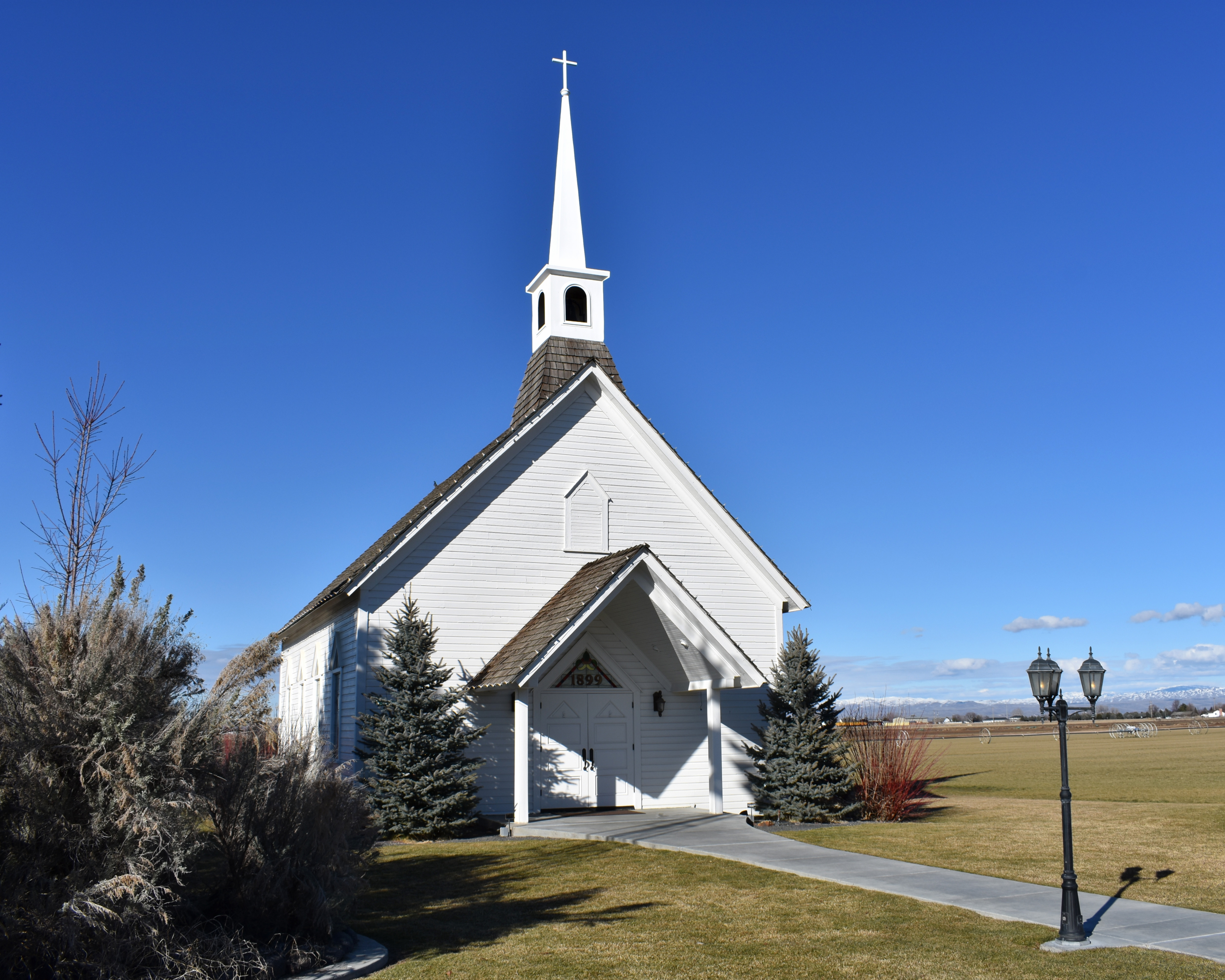
- MacMillan Chapel in 2019

- Location within Idaho Location within the United States
- Nearest city: Nampa, Idaho
- Coordinates: 43.636136°N 116.521970°W
- Area: 1.2 acres (0.49 ha)
- Built: 1899
- Architect: Multiple; Casey, Will
- Architectural style: Carpenter Gothic
- NRHP reference No.: 84000989
- Added to NRHP: September 7, 1984

MacMillan Chapel, also known as Little White Chapel, near Nampa, Idaho, is a 1-story Carpenter Gothic church building constructed in 1899 near the corner of West MacMillan and North Cloverdale Roads in Ada County. John MacMillan had donated property for the Methodist Episcopal Church South, and congregation member Will Casey helped in the construction. The chapel was added to the National Register of Historic Places (NRHP) in 1984.

Albert and Hazel DeMeyer were married in the church in 1916, and they purchased both the building and the MacMillan farm in 1953. The DeMeyers donated the chapel to a nonprofit group in 1993, after the building was listed on the NRHP, and the chapel was moved to the corner of Hwy 20/26 and Star Road. Lewis and Anne McKellip purchased the building in 2004 and moved it to its present location at 18121 Dean Lane in Canyon County, near Nampa. The chapel is now part of the Still Water Hollow event venue.
