= Joseph Chitwood House =

Historic building in Boise, Idaho

- U.S. National Register of Historic Places
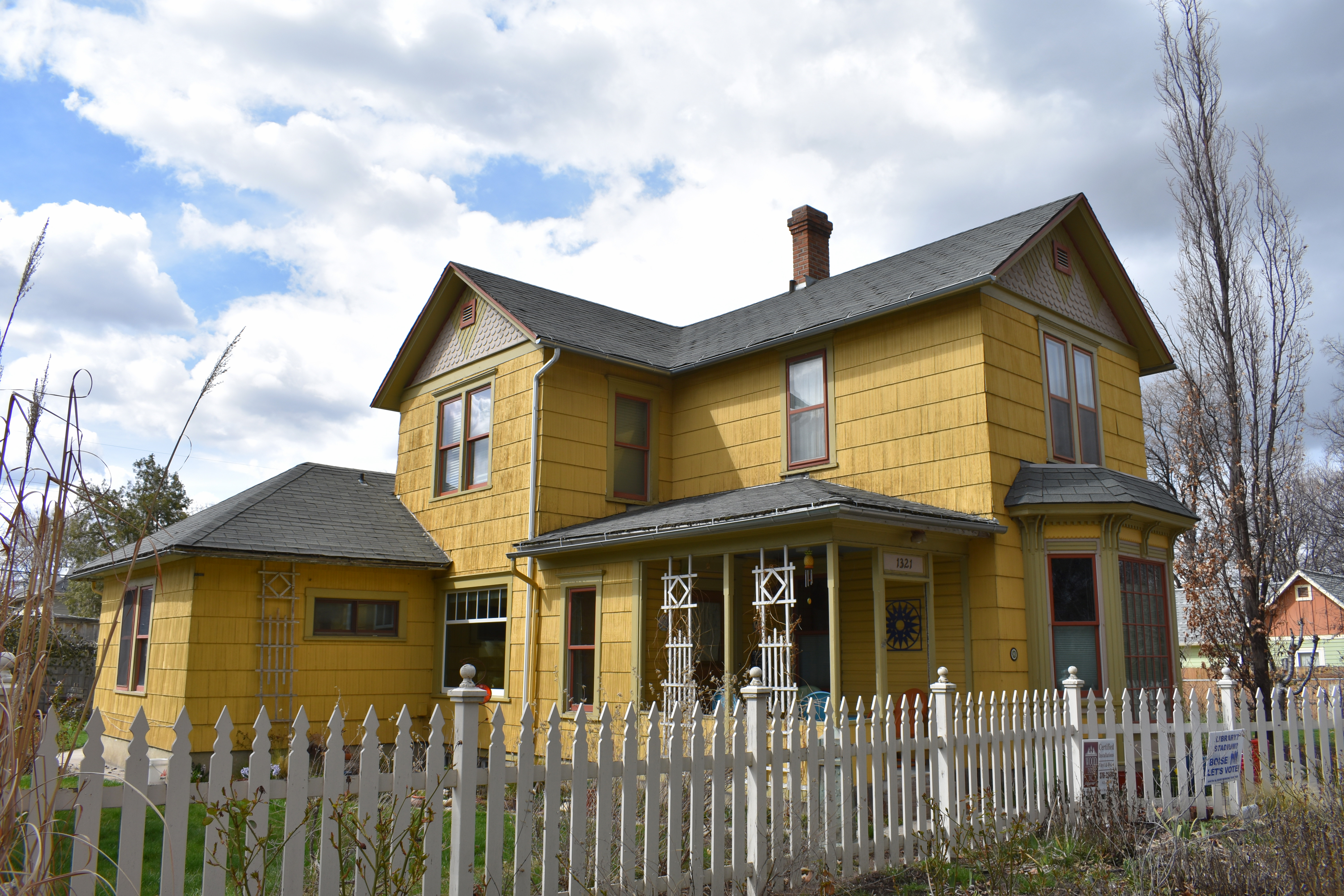
- The Joseph Chitwood House in 2019

- Location within Idaho Location within the United States
- Location: 1321 Denver St., Boise, Idaho
- Coordinates: 43°35′48″N 116°11′39″W
- Area: less than one acre
- Built: 1892
- Built by: Chitwood, Joseph
- Architectural style: Queen Anne; Late 19th And Early 20th Century American Movements
- NRHP reference No.: 06000709
- Added to NRHP: August 23, 2006

The Joseph Chitwood House in Boise, Idaho, is a 2-story, vernacular Queen Anne house constructed by Joseph Chitwood in 1892. The house has been modified by a series of small expansions since its construction, and its original T-shape design is irregular. A prominent, beveled bay protrudes toward the Denver Street exposure, and a hip roof porch at left of the bay provides a sheltered entry. Front and side gables above the second floor are covered by a tent roof, with 1-story, hip roof additions toward the back of the house. The Chitwood House was added to the National Register of Historic Places in 2006.

Joseph R. Chitwood built his house beginning in 1891, and a lien was placed on the property in that year for nonpayment of $83 in construction materials. Later, Chitwood and three of his brothers owned a profitable mine at Thunder Mountain. Chitwood died unexpectedly at the mine in August, 1905, at the age of 46.

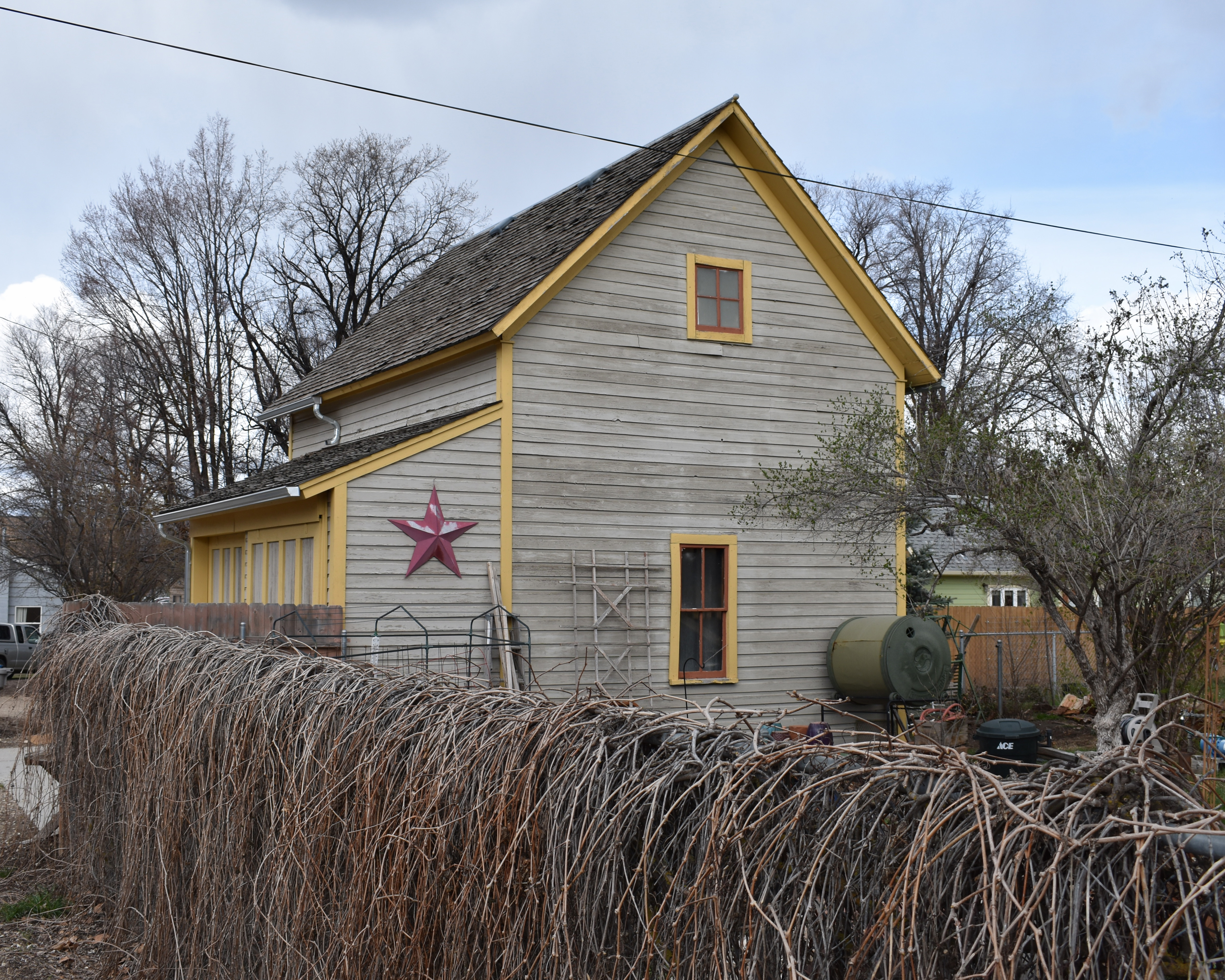
Barn

The property includes a 16 by 17 feet (4.9 m × 5.2 m) barn built in 1912, facing onto its service alley, which was extended slightly to be able to garage cars, and later stabilized by a poured foundation.
