= Lilyquist-Christianson Building =

- Lilyquist--Christianson Building
- U.S. National Register of Historic Places
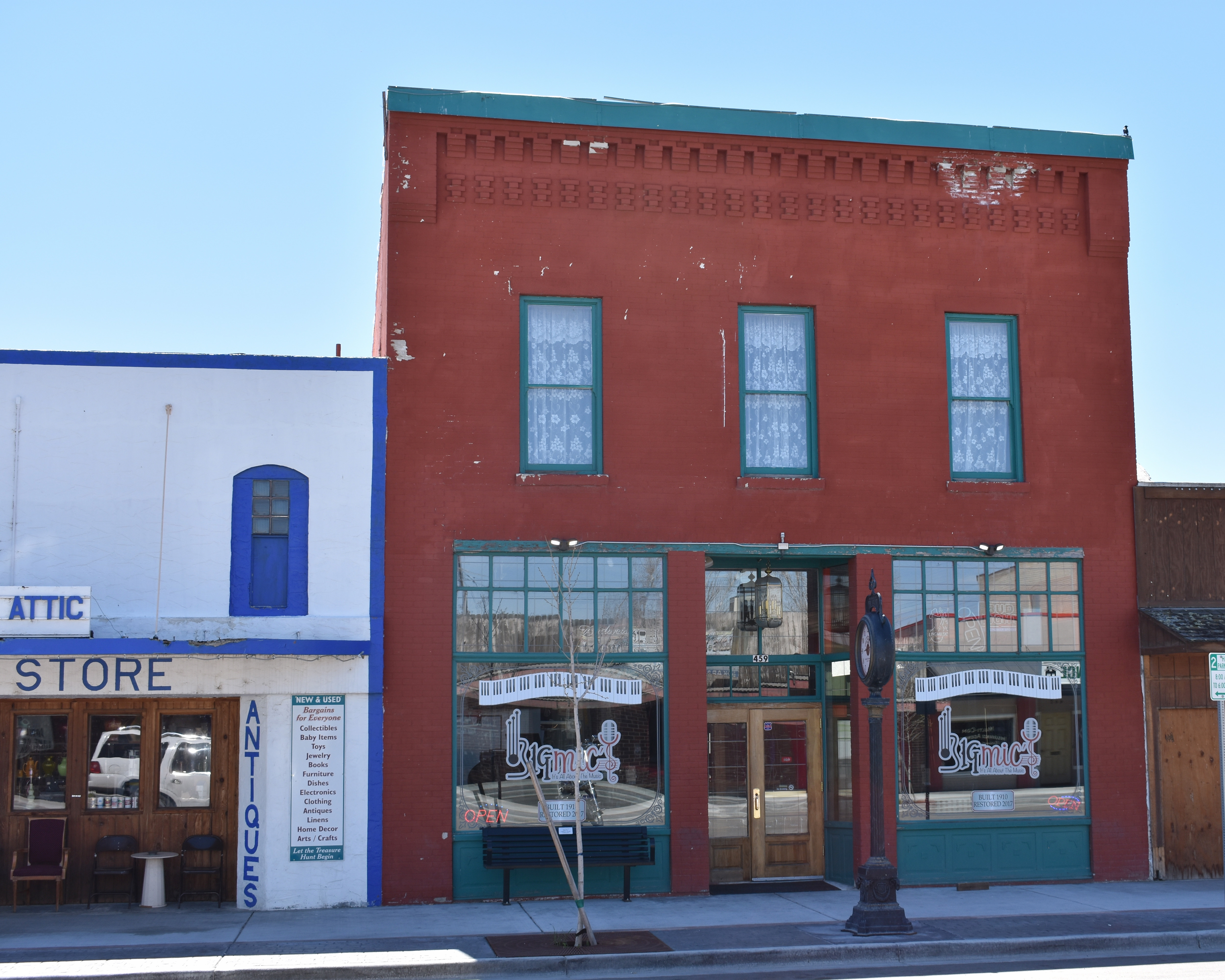
- The Lilyquist-Christianson Building in 2019

- Location within Idaho Location within the United States
- Location: 459 W. Main, Kuna, Idaho
- Coordinates: 43°29′26″N 116°25′03″W
- Area: less than one acre
- Built: 1909
- Built by: Lilyquist, Charles
- Architectural style: Commercial
- NRHP reference No.: 99000415
- Added to NRHP: April 1, 1999

The Lilyquist-Christianson Building in Kuna, Idaho, is a 2-story brick building constructed by Charles Lilyquist in 1909. The building features a decorative brick cornice with raised corbeling between end brackets below a flat parapet roof. Three symmetrical double hung sash windows are above a central, inset entry between two commercial display windows. The building was added to the National Register of Historic Places in 1999.

Charles and Emma Lilyquist arrived in Kuna in 1909, intending to open a general store. Their daughter's husband, A.H. Christianson, had arrived earlier that year and constructed a wood frame mercantile and hardware building across the street from what would become the Lilyquist-Christianson Building. When the Lilyquist building was nearing completion, Lilyquist fell from a ladder and died. Christenson finished construction and opened the general store with merchandise from the Lilyquist estate. In 1913 Christianson remodeled the Lilyquist building and moved his hardware business into the site. In 1918 Emma Lilyquist transferred ownership of the building to Christianson.

A.H. Christianson and his brothers operated their hardware business at the Lilyquist-Christianson Building at least until 1923, when they incorporated the Christianson Hardware and Implement Company of Nampa in Nampa, Idaho.
