= Pedro Echevarria House =

Historic NRHP building in Boise, Idaho

- U.S. National Register of Historic Places
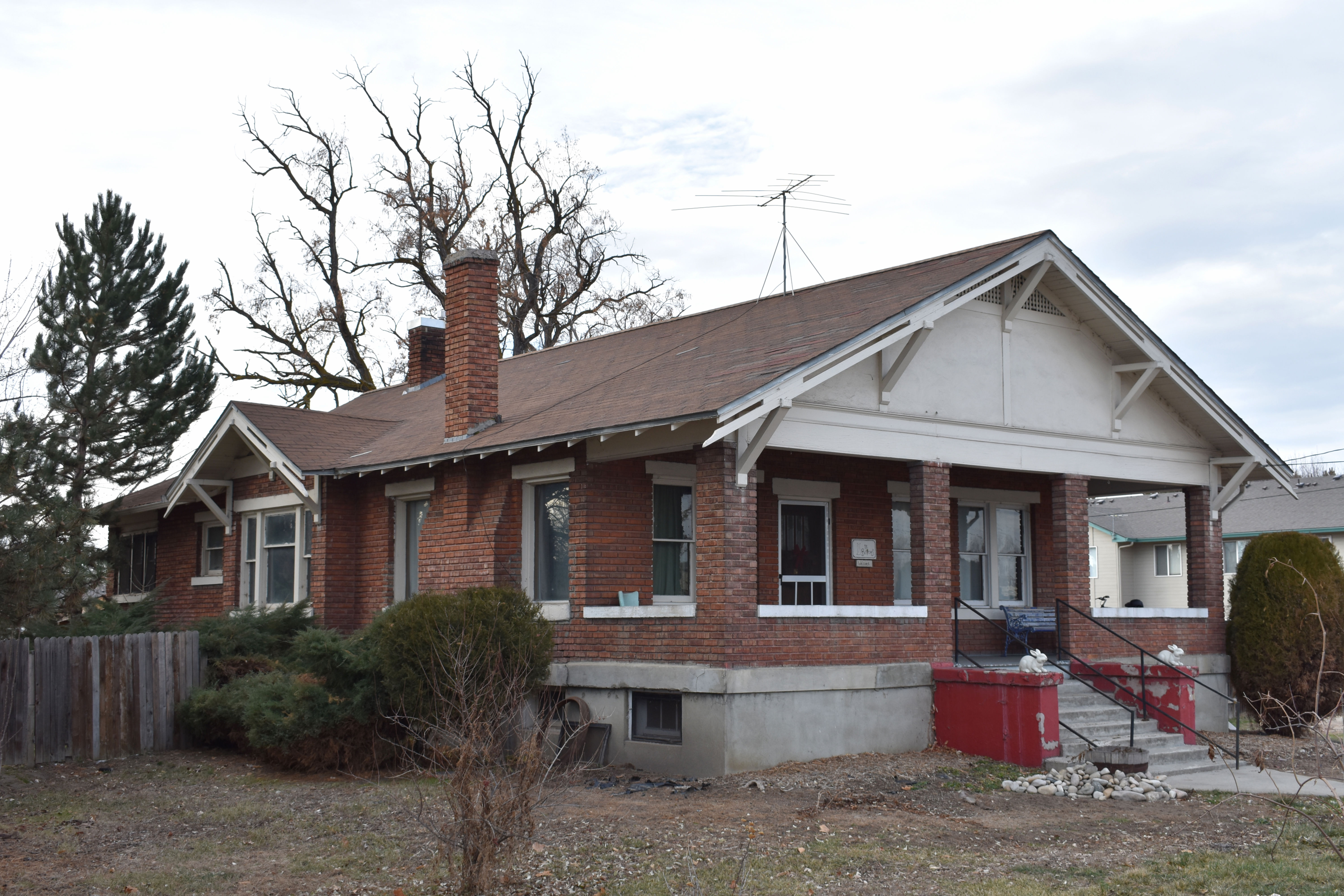
- The Pedro Echevarria House in 2019

- Location within Idaho Location within the United States
- Location: 5605 State St., Garden City, Idaho
- Coordinates: 43°39′21″N 116°15′33″W
- Area: less than one acre
- Built: 1920
- Architect: Tourtellotte & Hummel
- Architectural style: Bungalow/craftsman
- MPS: Tourtellotte and Hummel Architecture TR
- NRHP reference No.: 82000196
- Added to NRHP: November 17, 1982

The Pedro Echevarria House at 5605 W. State Street in Garden City, Idaho, is a brick and wood frame Bungalow designed by Tourtellotte and Hummel and constructed in 1920 for Pedro and Maria Echevarria. The house was listed on the National Register of Historic Places in 1982.

In 2018 a developer proposed building 19 small houses on the site, preserving the Pedro Echevarria House as the community center of a cohousing neighborhood, but the City rejected the proposal as "incompatible with the city's comprehensive plan."

== Pedro Echevarria ==
Pedro Echevarria (June 5, 1881 – July 22, 1953) was an immigrant from Spain who moved to the Boise area in 1901 and later operated the Big Creek Sheep Co.

Echevarria became a naturalized citizen of the United States in 1909.
