= Lowell School =

Lowell School or James Russell Lowell School may refer to:

- Lowell School (Boise, Idaho)
- James Russell Lowell Elementary School, Louisville, Kentucky, listed on the NRHP in Jefferson County, Kentucky
- Lowell School (Cambridge, Massachusetts)
- Lowell School (St. Louis, Missouri), listed on the NRHP in St. Louis, Missouri
- James Russell Lowell School (Philadelphia, Pennsylvania)
- Lowell School (Washington, DC)

== See also ==
- Lowell Elementary School (disambiguation)
