= Kieldson Double House =

- U.S. National Register of Historic Places
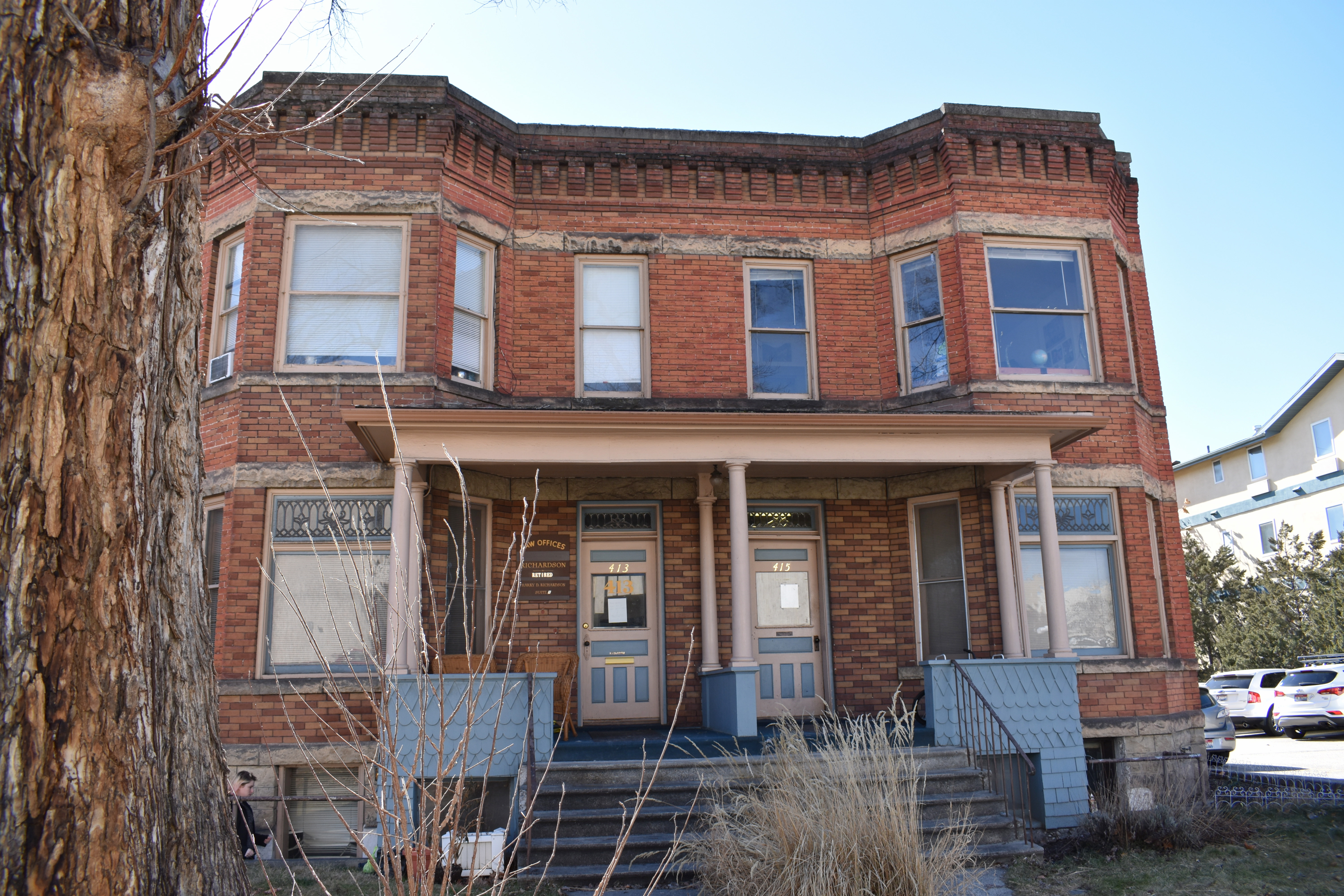
- The Kieldson Double House in 2019

- Location within Idaho Location within the United States
- Location: 413-415 Jefferson St., Boise, Idaho
- Coordinates: 43°36′57″N 116°11′48″W
- Area: less than one acre
- Built: 1903
- Built by: Kieldson, Louis
- Architect: Tourtellotte, John E. & Company
- Architectural style: Renaissance, Late Medieval
- MPS: Tourtellotte and Hummel Architecture TR
- NRHP reference No.: 82000217
- Added to NRHP: November 17, 1982

The Kieldson Double House in Boise, Idaho, is a 2-story, brick and stone building with a Renaissance Revival facade containing late medieval elements. The duplex was designed by Tourtellotte & Co. and constructed in 1903. It features two prominent, beveled bays each on either side of a common porch. The site was added to the National Register of Historic Places (NRHP) in 1982.

Louis P. Kieldson (b. March 29, 1865, Denmark) was a brick and stonemason who arrived in Boise City in 1891. Kieldson was employed as a contractor on many local building projects, including the Idanha Hotel, Carnegie Library, and Garfield School. In 1904 he constructed his own house adjacent to the Kieldson Double House on Jefferson Street, although the Kieldson House is not listed on the NRHP. Kieldson later served on the Boise City Council.

== See also ==
- National Register of Historic Places listings in Ada County, Idaho
