= Cole School and Gymnasium =

Historic building in Boise, Idaho

- U.S. National Register of Historic Places
- Cole School in 1982

- Location within Idaho Location within the United States
- Location: 7415 Fairview Ave., Boise, Idaho
- Coordinates: 43°37′08″N 116°16′27″W
- Area: 7 acres (2.8 ha)
- Built: 1903
- Built by: I. J. Allen
- Architect: Campbell & Wayland; Tourtellotte & Hummel
- Architectural style: Romanesque, Modern Movement, Art Deco
- MPS: Boise Public Schools TR
- NRHP reference No.: 82000189
- Added to NRHP: November 8, 1982

Cole School and Gymnasium in Boise, Idaho, was a 2-story, stucco over brick school building with stone trim. The year of construction was likely 1903, although in an annual report issued by the Boise School District 1972–73, the year was given as 1908. Above the main entry of a 1951 addition to the building was written, "Cole Elementary Est. 1888." The buildings were added to the National Register of Historic Places (NRHP) in 1982.

== History ==
Orric and Ella (Bown) Cole donated part of their farmland for construction of a school on March 30, 1888, and the original Cole School was constructed in that year. Ella Cole taught at the school during its first five years. By 1891 Cole School was part of School District 29, and it may have been the only school in the district.

By 1903 Cole School was part of School District 5, and a new school building had been designed by architects Campbell & Wayland. Contractor I. J. Allen constructed the 2-story, 8-room brick schoolhouse. It opened in November, 1903, with Professor John H. Kruger as principal. The building featured a hipped roof and secondary hipped roofs at each corner, with a central bell tower above and behind a small, hipped gable with dormer centered above the Romanesque entry.

Cole School became a stop on the Intermountain Electric Railway, later the Boise Interurban Railway, in 1904.

In 1937 Tourtellotte & Hummel designed a 2-story Art Deco gymnasium and cafeteria adjacent to the school, and in 1951 a 1-story addition to the school was constructed.

Cole School was annexed into the Independent School District of Boise City in 1948.

In 1975 the Boise School District identified three school sites, Garfield, Campus, and Cole, as being "hazardous and noisy locations for elementary schools." Of these, only Garfield School remains. Campus School was closed in 1990 and became part of Boise State University.

A bell was installed in the tower at Cole School.

Cole School closed on June 5, 2008, and the school district announced plans for demolition. A committee of preservationists and local activists tried to save the school, but it was demolished in November, 2009.
