= Sterry Hall =

Historic NRHP building in Caldwell, Idaho

- U.S. National Register of Historic Places
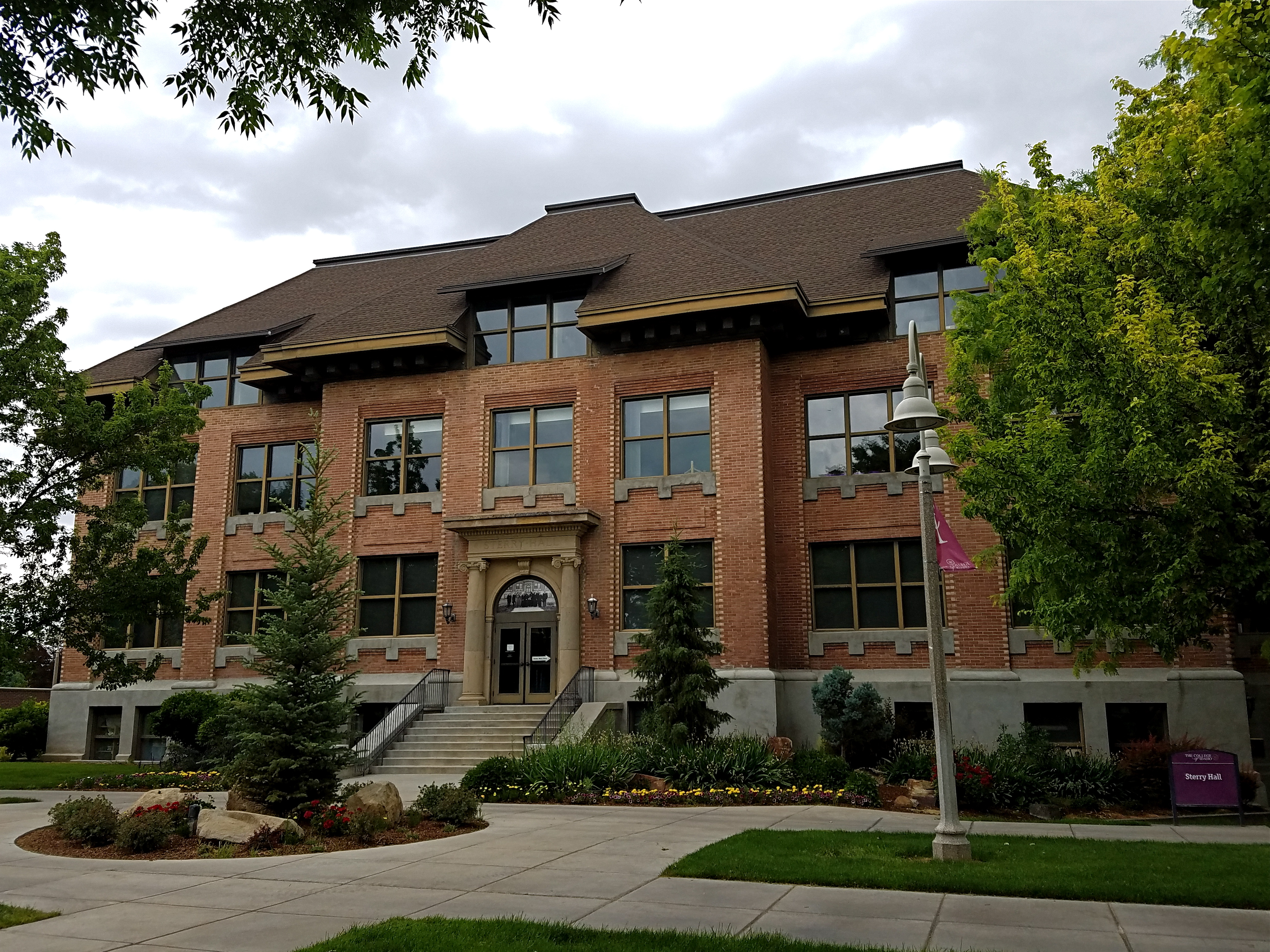
- Sterry Hall in 2018

- Location within Idaho Location within the United States
- Location: College of Idaho campus, Caldwell, Idaho
- Coordinates: 43°39′14″N 116°40′33″W
- Area: less than one acre
- Built: 1909
- Architect: Nisbet & Paradice
- Architectural style: Late 19th and 20th Century Revivals, French Renaissance
- NRHP reference No.: 78001056
- Added to NRHP: March 8, 1978

Sterry Hall at the College of Idaho in Caldwell, Idaho, is a French Renaissance style building designed in 1909 by Boise architects Nisbet & Paradice and completed in 1910. It was added to the National Register of Historic Places in 1978.

== History ==
The College of Idaho was founded in 1891 in what is now the North Caldwell Historic District. After 18 years at that location and another near the Canyon County Courthouse, the college had outgrown its wood-frame buildings and had begun a move in 1909 to property donated by Henry and Carrie Blatchley. The college had secured a $25,000 grant from Andrew Carnegie with a stipulation that an endowment be established and three $25,000 buildings be constructed. Sterry Hall was one of the buildings.

The Caldwell Tribune in 1909 listed the purpose of not yet named Sterry Hall, that it "will contain offices and rooms for the teachers, seven recitation rooms, chemical and physical laboratories, library, assembly room with a seating capacity of 450, rest rooms for both boys and girls, manual training room, large store room, shower bath room and a janitor's room with sleeping quarters."

During construction of Sterry Hall in 1909, about 200 students attended the college. New faculty included Miss Merrel Jewel (English and history), Miss Stillman (Latin and English), Miss Elizabeth Parker (drawing and painting), Miss Grace Johnson (music), Mr. John T. Lawlill (mathematics and science), and Mr. Hugh Kingery (science). Returning faculty included Miss Finney, Miss Franklin, Professor Gipson, Professor Kyle, and President Boone.

The building is named for Christopher W. Sterry, father of donor Mary Elizabeth (Sterry) Kirkpatrick.

It was designed by Boise architects Nisbet & Paradice.

== See also ==
- Blatchley Hall
- Carrie Adell Strahorn Memorial Library
