= Lower Main Street Commercial Historic District =

- U.S. National Register of Historic Places
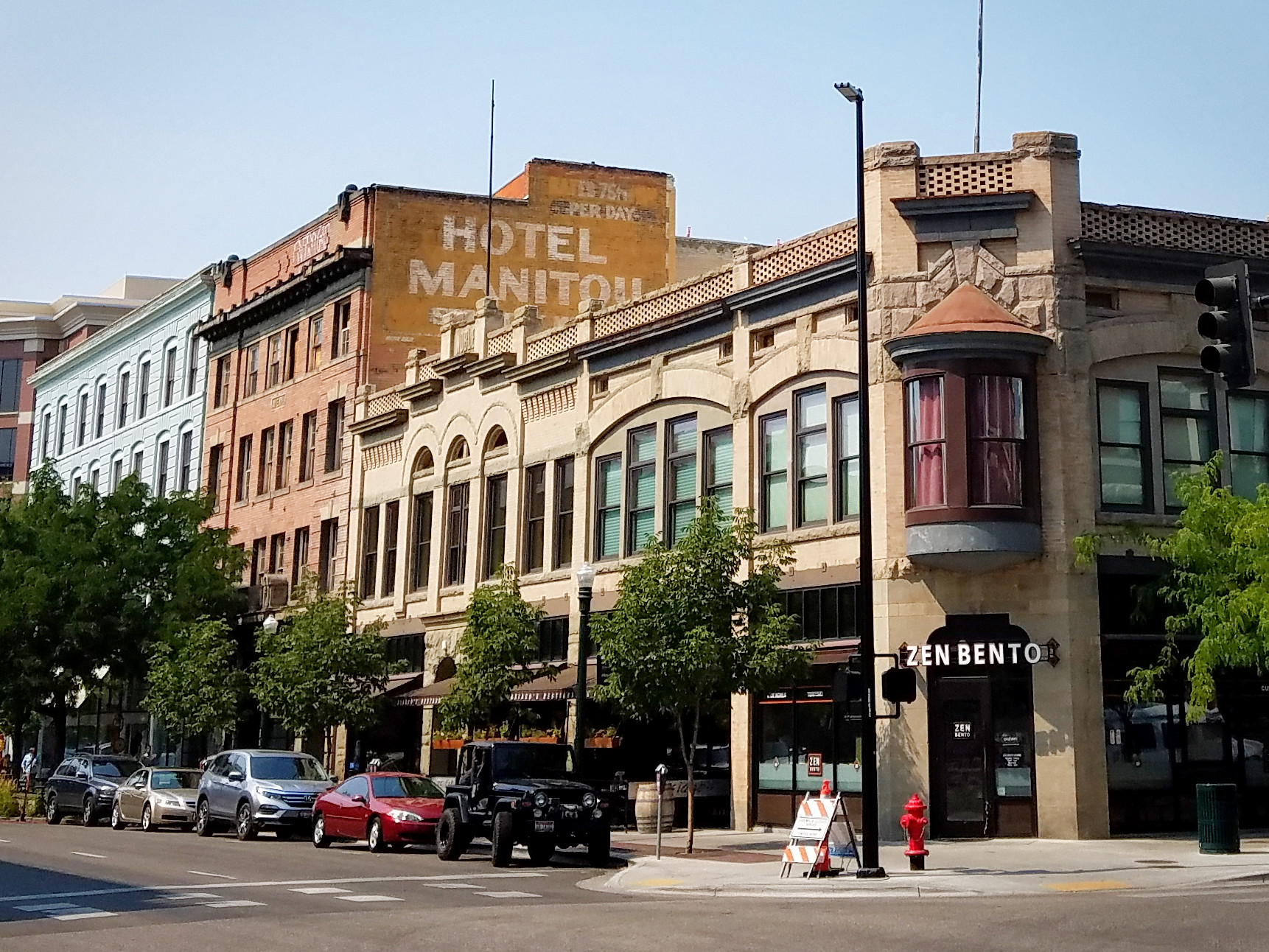
- The Lower Main Street Commercial Historic District in 2018

- Location within Idaho Location within the United States
- Location: Main St. between 10th and 12th Sts., Boise, Idaho
- Area: 4 acres (1.6 ha)
- Architect: Multiple
- Architectural style: Renaissance, Romanesque
- NRHP reference No.: 80001290
- Added to NRHP: November 28, 1980

The Lower Main Street Commercial Historic District in Boise, Idaho, is a collection of 11 masonry buildings, originally 14 buildings, that were constructed 1897-1914 as Boise became a metropolitan community. Hannifin's Cigar Store is the oldest business in the district (1922), and it operates in the oldest building in the district (1897). The only building listed as an intrusion in the district is the Safari Motor Inn (1966), formerly the Hotel Grand (1914).

The area was listed on the National Register of Historic Places November 28, 1980.

== Inventory ==
- Gem Block (1902); 1000, 1002 Main St. The Gem Block is a 2-story, Romanesque Revival structure that includes the Gem Building at the corner of 10th and Main Streets, owned by Sigmund Falk, and the adjoining Gibbons & Knight Building at 109 N 10th St., owned by Gibbons & Knight Harness Shop. Both buildings were designed by Tourtellotte & Co. and constructed in 1902, and the brick and sandstone facade presents the appearance that the structure is only one building. In 1902 the Gibbons & Knight Building was considered "in the rear of the Gem Block on tenth street." Sandstone for the buildings came from separate locations, however, and where the Gem Building used locally sourced, grey sandstone from nearby Table Rock, the Gibbons & Knight Building required stone from Tenino, Washington, as did the Noble Block on Main Street, also adjoining the Gem Block.
- Noble Block (1902); 1008 Main St. Designed by Tourtellotte & Co. and constructed of brick and sandstone to match the adjoining Gem Block, the Noble Block continues the 2-story, Romanesque Revival style popular at the beginning of the 20th century. The building was constructed for sheep farmer John Noble, and it became known as the Noble rooming house.
- Tiner Building (1910); 1010 Main St. The original, 2-story Tiner Building was constructed of pressed brick and sandstone in 1902 as commercial space for the Tootle, Wheeler & Motter Mercantile Co., later Wheeler-Motter Co., a chain of department stores based in St. Joseph, Missouri. The building burned in 1910, and a 4-story, Renaissance Revival Tiner Building, designed by Wayland & Fennell, was constructed on the site later that year. The new building housed the Boz Theater and the Manitou Hotel. Alice S. Tiner was an Idaho pioneer who invested in property along Main Street prior to her marriage to Isham L. Tiner, a former saloon keeper, grocer, and constable. Mrs. Tiner's new building was thought to provide "the handsomest entrance and lobby in the city."
- Alaska Building (1906); 1016 Main St. The original, 2-story Alaska Building was designed by Tourtellotte & Co. and constructed in 1906, and the design included an eventual 4-story building. Contractor Kent & Montgomery set a construction record in 1906, 23 days to complete the brick work, which included load bearing supports for the 1911 addition of two stories. Soon after construction, the second floor of the Alaska Building became the "Antlers" rooming house. John P. Tate, owner of the building, also owned the Angus Hotel building across the street. The Bazaar store, begun by Eugene Riley and J.A. Blake, rented commercial space in the building in 1906, later leasing all four stories by 1922. John P. Tate was an insurance salesman and real estate investor, and he helped to found Boise's Y.M.C.A.
- Beckwith Building (1897); 1024 Main St. The 1-story, brick and stone Beckwith Building was designed by John E. Tourtellotte. In 1902 owner H.H. Beckwith considered adding a second story, but the building was not expanded upward. Salmon Cigar Store occupied the corner commercial space, and Joseph Collins Printing Co. rented another part of the building. When Edmund Salmon died in 1922, his associate, John B. Hannifin, renamed the tobacco business the Hannifin Cigar Store. Henry Herbert Beckwith was a real estate dealer in Boise, although he may not have lived there.
- Beckwith Building Annex (1910); 110 N 11th St. H.H. Beckwith constructed a 1-story building adjoining the Beckwith Building (1897) in 1910.
- John P. Tate Additions (1904); 107, 109 N 11th St. Constructed on the former site of the Idaho Implement Company, the Tate Additions were retail enhancements that adjoined the Tate Building. The buildings were demolished after designation of the historic district.
- John P. Tate Building (1904); 1102 Main St. Constructed at the former Idaho Implement Company building, the Tate Building was designed by Wayland & Fennell and occupied the northeast corner of 11th and Main Streets. It contained two storefronts at street level and a rooming house on the second floor. The building was demolished after designation of the historic district, and John P. Tate's only remaining edifice in the district is the Alaska Building (1906).
- Whipple Block (1904); 1106 Main St. The 2-story Whipple Block was designed by Wayland & Fennell and occupied the middle 50 feet of the former Idaho Implement Company building. The building was demolished after designation of the historic district. Willis R. Whipple was a farmer from Payette, Idaho.
- Larsen Building (1904); 1112 Main St. Constructed in the west 50 feet of the Idaho Implement Company building, the Larsen Building was designed by Tourtellotte & Co. and was considered "one of the handsomest blocks in the district." It was demolished after designation of the historic district. Niels C. Larsen operated the California Wine House and a hotel in the building.
- Owyhee Hotel (1910); 1117 Main St. The 7-story, brick and granite Owyhee Hotel was designed by Tourtellotte & Hummel for Leo J. Falk and the Schubert Hotel Co., and it operated under the direction of Eugene W. Schubert, former manager of Boise's Idanha Hotel. An artesian well flowed 2000 gallons of water per hour at the hotel, and the building housed over 200 guest rooms and three dining rooms. In 1909 the Schubert Hotel Co. sponsored a contest to name the hotel, and it chose "Owyhee," the name of Idaho's Owyhee Mountains, borrowed from a name the indigenous peoples of the Sandwich Islands gave their homeland. "Sitting Bull Hotel" was a name rejected by the company. The building was converted to apartments and office space.
- Grand Hotel (1914); 104 S 11th St. The 2-story Hotel Grand was designed by Nisbet & Paradice and featured 39 guest rooms, seven with private baths. Owner Roscoe Smith constructed the hotel for C.C. Childs, former manager of the Manitou Hotel at the Tiner Building, and the Grand featured a cafeteria. Dr. Roscoe Smith was a pharmacist in Mountain Home, Idaho, and he was vice president of Boise's Owyhee Hotel. The hotel was liquidated in 1966, and the Safari Motor Inn was constructed on the site. According to the site survey for the historic district, the "fabric of the building" was retained from the Grand Hotel, although a 1966 photograph during construction of the Safari Motor Inn suggests that the building was demolished. The site survey nonetheless marked the Safari Motor Inn as an intrusion in the district.
- Smith Block (1905); 1015 Main St. The 2-story, brick and stone Smith Block was constructed by contractors Avey & Avey for Roscoe Smith, a pharmacist in Mountain Home, Idaho. The building contained commercial space at street level and a 16-room hotel on the second floor. Soon after the building opened, it briefly became the clearinghouse for "Japanese goods" exhibited at both the Louisiana Purchase Exposition in St. Louis and the Lewis and Clark Centennial Exposition in Portland.
- Larson Building (1910); 1011 Main St. The 2-story, brick and stone Larson Building was designed by Wayland & Fennell for owner Robert Noble. Noble had purchased the property from grocers Prout & Larson, also known as Prout & Larsen. After construction, the grocers remained at the site, and the Clyde rooming house operated on the second floor. The Clyde later became the Olympic Hotel. By 1911 the retail business had been renamed Prout Grocery, and by 1915 George W. Prout had relocated his store to Warm Springs Avenue. Eli L. Larson was an early partner in the firm.

== See also ==
- Downtown Boise
