= Longfellow School =

Longfellow School may refer to:

in the United States

(by state and then city)

- Longfellow School (Boise, Idaho), listed on the NRHP in Ada County, Idaho
- Longfellow Grade School, Butte, Montana, listed on the NRHP in Silver Bow County, Montana
- Longfellow School (Raton, New Mexico), listed on the NRHP in Colfax County, New Mexico
- Henry Longfellow School, in northeast Philadelphia, Pennsylvania, NRHP-listed
- Longfellow School (Swissvale, Pennsylvania), NRHP-listed
- Longfellow School (Rutland, Vermont), NRHP-listed
- Longfellow School (Madison, Wisconsin), NRHP-listed
- Longfellow School (Ripon, Wisconsin), listed on the NRHP in Fond du Lac County, Wisconsin
