= Carrie Adell Strahorn Memorial Library =

- Strahorn, Carrie Adell, Memorial Library
- U.S. National Register of Historic Places
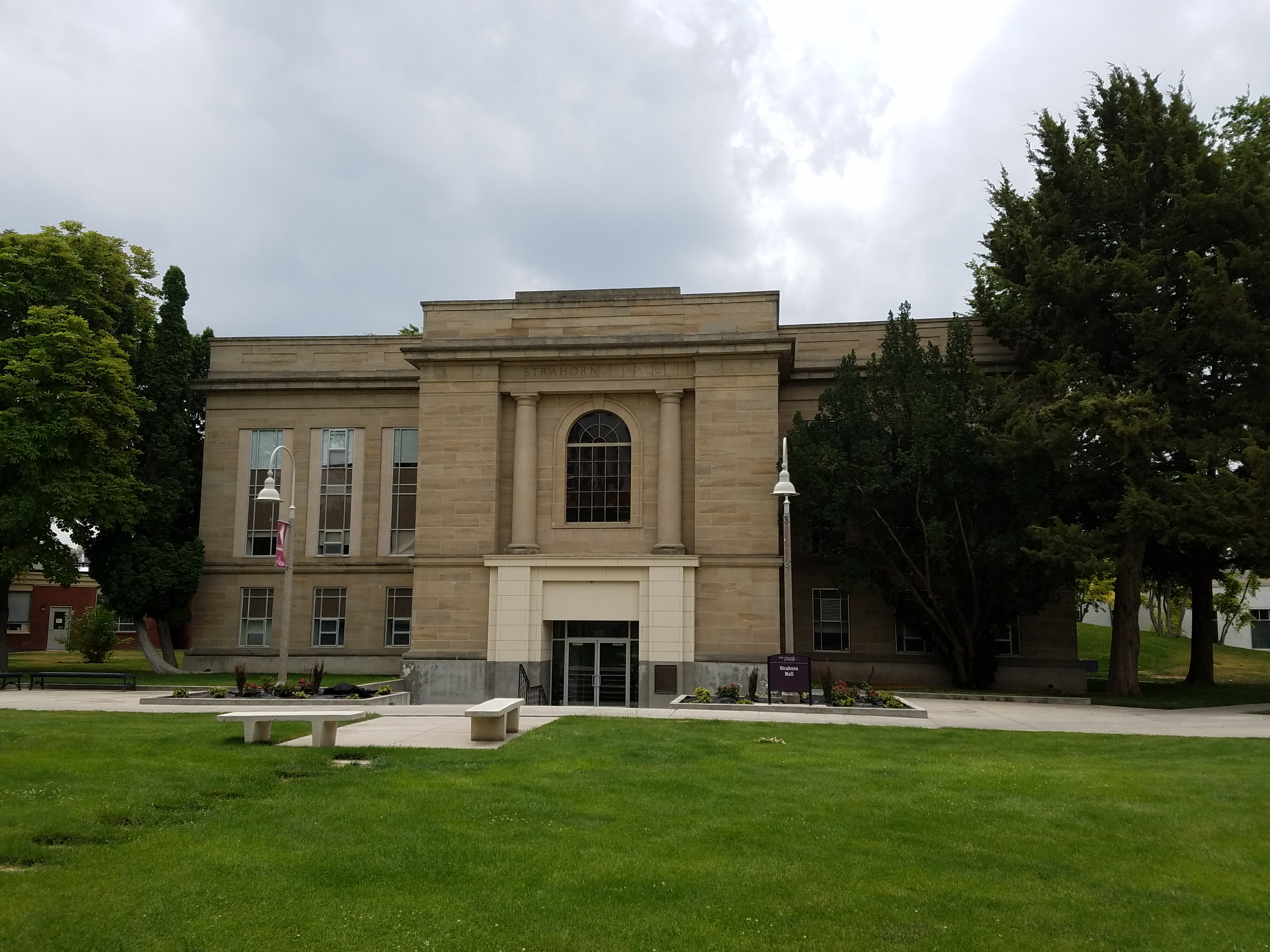
- Strahorn Hall in 2018

- Location within Idaho Location within the United States
- Location: College of Idaho, Caldwell, Idaho
- Coordinates: 43°39′11″N 116°40′34″W
- Area: less than one acre
- Built: 1925
- Architect: Wayland & Fennell; McNeel, J.H.
- Architectural style: Classical Revival
- NRHP reference No.: 82002510
- Added to NRHP: April 15, 1982

Carrie Adell Strahorn Memorial Library at the College of Idaho in Caldwell, Idaho, was designed by Boise architects Wayland and Fennell as a 1-story, Neoclassical structure. The building opened in 1926 and served the college as a library until 1967 and the opening of Terteling Library. In 1968 the building was renamed Strahorn Hall, and it was added to the National Register of Historic Places in 1982.

== History ==
The city of Caldwell was platted in 1883 by Robert E. Strahorn, and in 1891 the College of Idaho enrolled its first class of 19 students at a location near Strahorn's home in what is now the North Caldwell Historic District. The college moved to its present campus in 1910.

In 1925 Strahorn donated money for construction of the Carrie Adell Strahorn Memorial Library, named in memory of his wife. At the time, the college employed 25 faculty with an enrollment of 500 students. By 1932 the library included more than 10,000 books, and in 1942 the count was 22,000 books.

The library was expanded in 1962, and when a new library opened in 1967 Strahorn was remodeled, reopening in 1968 with offices and classrooms under the name Strahorn Hall.

Reflecting on the building, a librarian wrote in 1961, "On the day it first opened its doors in 1926 Strahorn Library was already a badly outdated building whose construction violated every theory of library architecture."

== See also ==
- Blatchley Hall
- Sterry Hall
