= Warm Springs Avenue Historic District =

- U.S. National Register of Historic Places
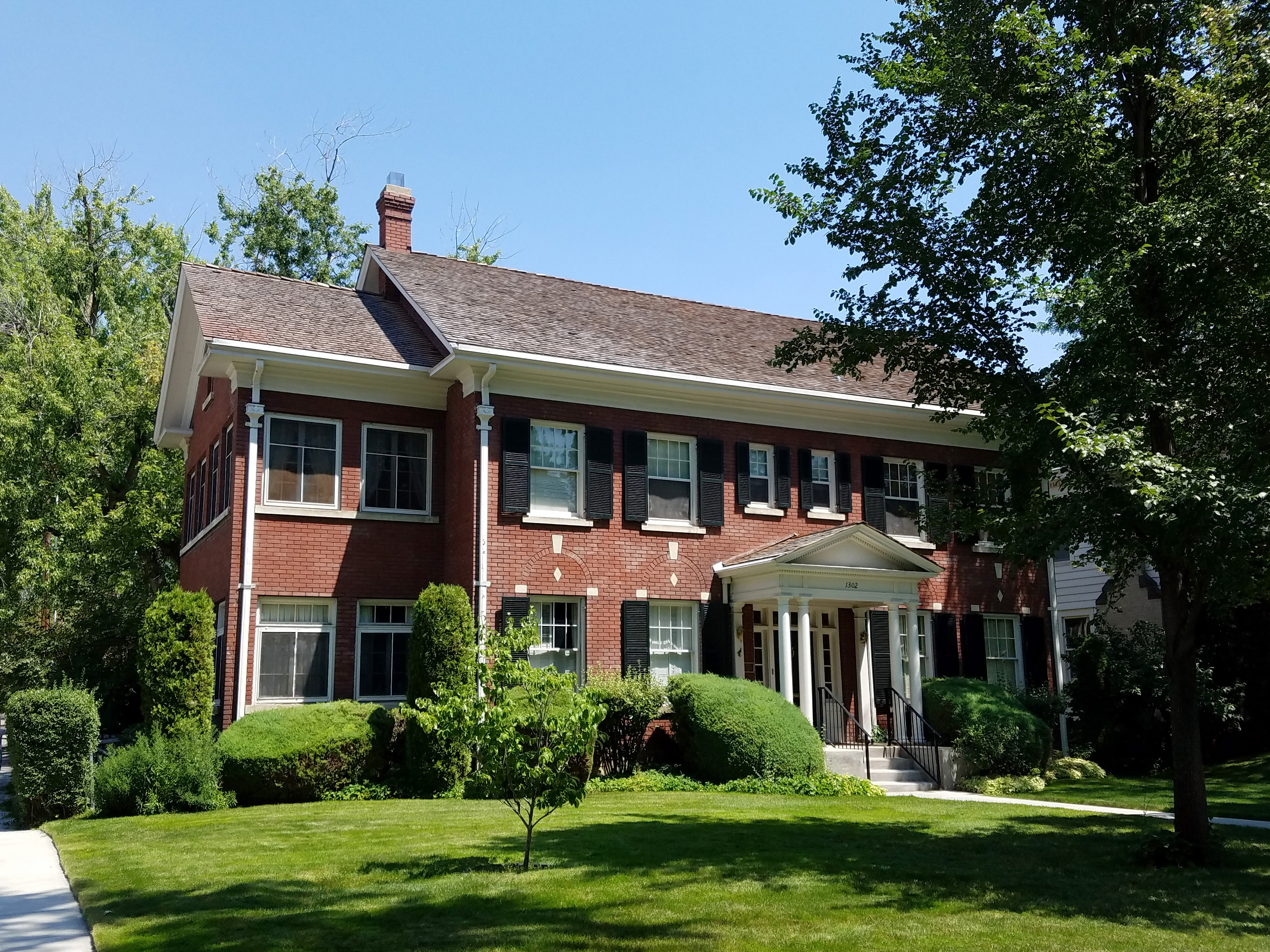
- The Charles C. Cavanah House (1925) is a contributing resource in the Warm Springs Avenue Historic District.

- Location within Idaho Location within the United States
- Location: Warm Springs Ave., Boise, Idaho
- Area: 53 acres (21 ha)
- Architect: Multiple
- Architectural style: Colonial Revival, Queen Anne, Bungalow;Tudor;Mission Rev.
- NRHP reference No.: 80001287
- Added to NRHP: September 22, 1980

The Warm Springs Avenue Historic District in Boise, Idaho, is a residential area with 96 contributing houses representing a variety of architectural styles constructed between 1870 and 1940. The district includes Queen Anne, Colonial Revival, Tudor Revival, Bungalow, and other styles representing the work of architects Tourtellotte & Hummel, Wayland & Fennell, Kirtland Cutter, and others. The Children's Home Society of Idaho occupies the largest structure in the district, and its buildings are the only structures that are not houses.

In 1892 Christopher W. Moore built the first large house on Warm Springs Avenue. Moore owned the Boise Artesian Hot and Cold Water Company, and his house was the first residence in the United States to be heated by geothermal means. Other prominent Boise residents built homes on the avenue, and many depended on Moore's water company for heat.

The district was added to the National Register of Historic Places in 1980, and it was designated a local historic district by the City of Boise in 1996.

== List of contributing properties ==
This list of contributing resources includes the site name, year, address, architect, and style where information is available. Additional information and references are included for some properties.

=== South side of East Warm Springs Avenue ===
- Edwin Davis House (1910), 511 E Warm Springs Ave, Colonial Revival
- Davis Estate Rental House (1910), 525 E Warm Springs Ave, Colonial Revival
- Clement Moore House (1912), 531 E Warm Springs Ave, Colonial Revival
- John D. Springer House (1897), 605 E Warm Springs Ave, Queen Anne
- Robert Fraser House (1894), 615 E Warm Springs Ave, Queen Anne
- Lee Estes House (1903), 635 E Warm Springs Ave, John E. Tourtellotte & Company, Queen Anne
- Estes Carriage House (1903), 635 1/2 E Warm Springs Ave
- Benjamin and Emilie Wilson House (1895), 709 E Warm Springs Ave, Colonial Revival, Queen Anne
- Wilson Rental House (1896), 715 E Warm Springs Ave
- Wilson Rental House (1898), 739 E Warm Springs Ave
- Wilson Rental House (1898), 741 E Warm Springs Ave
- White Rental House (1900), 805 E Warm Springs Ave
- White Rental House (1901), 807 E Warm Springs Ave
- John White House (1900, 1923), 809, 809 1/2 E Warm Springs Ave
- F.H. Brandt House (1916), 815 E Warm Springs Ave, Prairie Style
- Craig Coffin House (1919), 829 E Warm Springs Ave, Wayland & Fennell, Colonial Revival
- Walter Cranston House (1935), 905 E Warm Springs Ave, Colonial Revival
- Jack Skillern House (1909), 915 E Warm Springs Ave, Wayland & Fennell, Bungalow
- C.C. Anderson House (1925), 929 E Warm Springs Ave, Kirtland Cutter, Jacobean Revival
- Charles O. Davidson House (1916), 945 E Warm Springs Ave, Wayland & Fennell, Colonial Revival
- William Regan House (1911), 1009 E Warm Springs Ave, Tourtellotte & Hummel, Mission Revival
- George Russell House (1869), 1035 E Warm Springs Ave, Colonial Revival
- J.E. Clinton House (1906), 1037 E Warm Springs Ave, Wayland & Fennell, Colonial Revival
- Moore-Cunningham House (1892), 1109 E Warm Springs Ave, James King, Queen Anne
- Frank H. Parsons House (1925), 1127 E Warm Springs Ave, Wayland & Fennell, Tudor Revival
- Roger M. Davidson House (1901), 1205 E Warm Springs Ave, W. S. Campbell, Colonial Revival
- Julius Steinmeier House (1907), 1215 E Warm Springs Ave (moved from First and Idaho Sts), John Smith, Colonial Revival
- S.B. Kingsbury House (1897), 1225 E Warm Springs Ave, James King, Queen Anne
- Joseph Dollard House (1938), 1305 E Warm Springs Ave, Colonial Revival
- J.B. Lyon House (1899), 1311 E Warm Springs Ave, Queen Anne, Colonial Revival
- Thomas Finnegan House (1901), 1321 E Warm Springs Ave, Queen Anne
- (1905, 1920), 1403 E Warm Springs Ave, Bungalow
- Jesse Jackson House (1906), 1415 E Warm Springs Ave, Colonial Revival
- John K. Enboe House (1903), 1419 E Warm Springs Ave, Campbell & Wayland, Queen Anne
- Thomas K. Little House (1922), 1433 E Warm Springs Ave, Colonial Revival
- Eugene Brasie House (1920), 1503 E Warm Springs Ave, Colonial Revival
- Connor House (1919), 1505 E Warm Springs Ave, Bungalow
- 1525 E Warm Springs Ave, Colonial Revival
- Robert Davidson House (1920), 1609 E Warm Springs Ave, Colonial Revival
- Charles Rathbun House (1919), 1615 E Warm Springs Ave, Wayland & Fennell, Colonial Revival
- C.H. Nixon House (1922), 1621 E Warm Springs Ave, Bungalow
- John W. Maynard House (1879), 1703 E Warm Springs Ave
- (1930s), 1707 E Warm Springs Ave, Colonial Revival

=== North side of East Warm Springs Avenue ===
- 510 E Warm Springs Ave, Queen Anne
- 514 E Warm Springs Ave
- 520 E Warm Springs Ave, Bungalow
- 530 E Warm Springs Ave, Bungalow
- 600 E Warm Springs Ave, Colonial Revival
- 604 E Warm Springs Ave, Colonial Revival
- Children's Home Society of Idaho (1910, 1934), 740 E Warm Springs Ave, Tourtellotte & Hummel, Colonial Revival
- (1898), 836 E Warm Springs Ave
- Lola Shaw House (1917), 838 E Warm Springs Ave, Bungalow
- (1898), 840 E Warm Springs Ave
- (1922), 848 E Warm Springs Ave, Bungalow
- Joseph Kinney House (1904), 904 E Warm Springs Ave, John E. Tourtellotte & Company, Queen Anne
- John S. Parker House (1910), 910 E Warm Springs Ave, Colonial Revival
- Risley House, 912 E Warm Springs Ave, Colonial Revival
- Carl J. Hill House (1913), 916 E Warm Springs Ave, Wayland & Fennell, Colonial Revival
- W.M. Davidson House (1905), 920 E Warm Springs Ave, Tourtellotte & Co., Colonial Revival, Bungalow
- Benjamin F. Howe (1913), 1002 E Warm Springs Ave, Colonial Revival
- Roger C. Davidson House (1938), 1010 E Warm Springs Ave, Colonial Revival
- J.E. Moore House (1912), 1016 E Warm Springs Ave, Colonial Revival
- B.W. Walker House (1909), 1104 E Warm Springs Ave, Wayland & Fennell, Colonial Revival
- W.A. Goulder House (1890), 1110 E Warm Springs Ave
- C.V. Parks House (1939), 1120 E Warm Springs Ave, Tudor Revival
- I.B. Fitchen House (1895), 1204 E Warm Springs Ave, Queen Anne
- Charles C. Cavanah House (1925), 1302 E Warm Springs Ave, Charles F. Hummel, Colonial Revival
- Lindley Cox House, 1308 E Warm Springs Ave, Tourtellotte & Co., Colonial Revival
- F.F. Johnson House (1910), 1312 E Warm Springs Ave, Wayland & Fennell, Colonial Revival
- Leo Falk House (1922), 1320 E Warm Springs Ave, Kirtland Cutter, Mission Revival
- J.S. Springer House (1922), 1414 E Warm Springs Ave, Tudor Revival
- Alfred Budge House (1927), 1418 E Warm Springs Ave, Colonial Revival
- Jacob Wagner House (1894), 1420 E Warm Springs Ave, Queen Anne
- A.H. Budge House (1931), 1424 E Warm Springs Ave, Colonial Revival
- Edward Payne House (1899), 1504 E Warm Springs Ave, John E. Tourtellotte, Colonial Revival
- Francis Stone House (1930), 1510 E Warm Springs Ave, Tudor Revival
- Uriah Seaman House (1899), 1514 E Warm Springs Ave
- Richard B. Kading House (1922), 1516 E Warm Springs Ave, Bungalow
- Leo Falk House (1925), 1522 E Warm Springs Ave, Mediterranean Revival

=== Houses on streets parallel or intersecting with Warm Springs Avenue ===
- Clinton Carriage House (1920), 119 S Walnut St
- Eastman Carriage House, behind 1215 E Warm Springs Ave, visible from E Lewis St
- A.A. Fraser House (1920), 117 N Walnut St, Mediterranean Revival
- C.G. Barton House (1920), 118 N Walnut St, Colonial Revival
- William Northrup House (1910), 203 N Walnut St, Colonial Revival, Bungalow
- Margaret Davidson House (1925), 117 N Locust St, Mission Revival
- John D Springer House (1911), 120 N Locust St, Stick Style
- Louis Feldman House (1911), 909 E Bannock St, Colonial Revival, Queen Anne

== See also ==
- West Warm Springs Historic District
