= Fremont County Courthouse (Idaho) =

- U.S. National Register of Historic Places
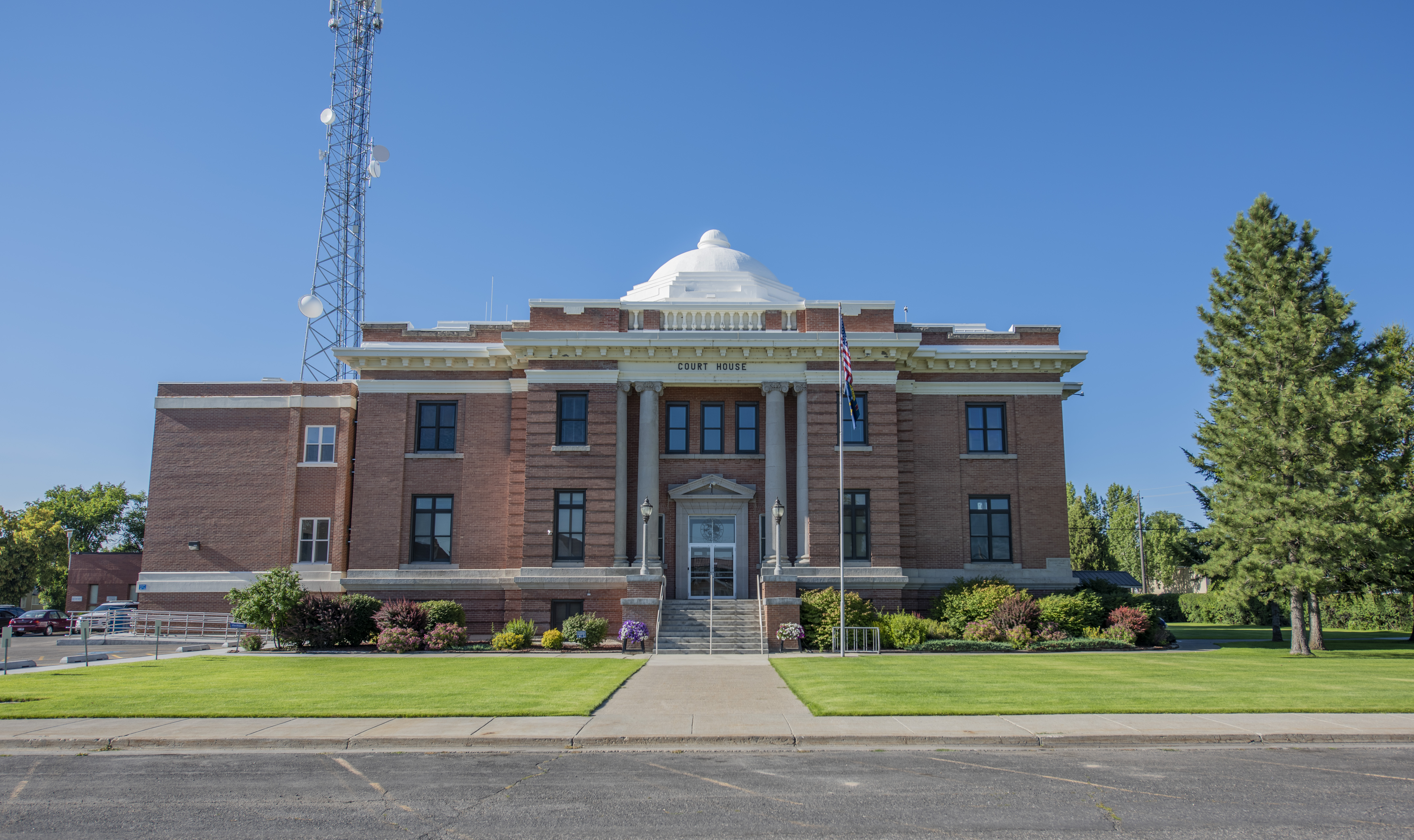
- Fremont County Courthouse in July 2020

- Location within Idaho Location within the United States
- Location: 151 W. 1st St., N., St. Anthony, Idaho
- Coordinates: 43°58′4″N 111°41′1″W
- Built: 1909
- Architect: Wayland & Fennell
- Architectural style: Classical Revival
- NRHP reference No.: 79000789
- Added to NRHP: January 8, 1979

Fremont County Courthouse in St. Anthony, Idaho was built in 1909. It was listed on the National Register of Historic Places in 1979. The architects who designed the building were Wayland & Fennell.
