= Boise Junior College Administration Building =

- U.S. National Register of Historic Places
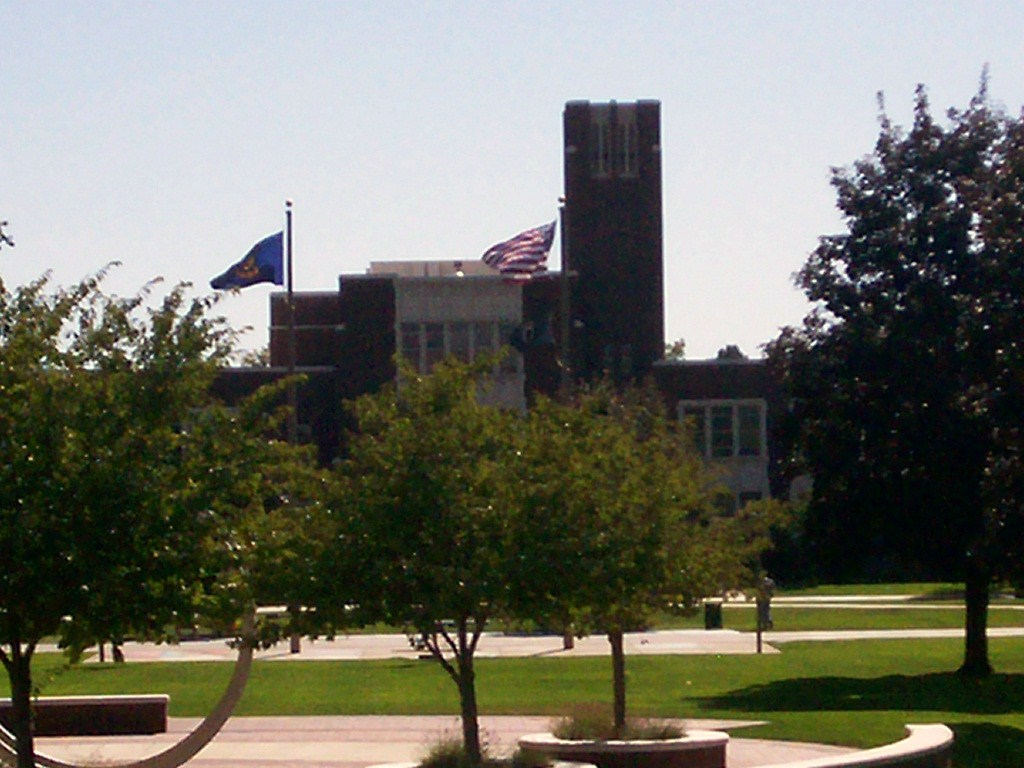

- Location within Idaho Location within the United States
- Location: Boise State University, Boise, Idaho
- Coordinates: 43°36′13″N 116°12′13″W
- Area: 3.8 acres (1.5 ha)
- Built: 1940
- Built by: J. O. Jordan
- Architect: Tourtellotte & Hummel; Wayland & Fennell
- Architectural style: Tudor Revival
- MPS: Tourtellotte and Hummel Architecture TR
- NRHP reference No.: 82000181
- Added to NRHP: November 17, 1982

The Boise Junior College Administration Building is a historic college building on the campus of Boise State University in Boise, Idaho. It was designed by the Boise architectural firms of Tourtellotte & Hummel and Wayland & Fennell, and placed on the National Register of Historic Places in 1982.

The Administration Building was built in 1940 to house nearly all of the functions of the newly established Boise Junior College. It originally housed the schools library, classrooms, and administrative offices, although the former have since been moved to other, newer buildings on campus.

Like Tourtellotte's Administration Building at the University of Idaho, it is designed in a Tudor Revival style.

== See also ==
- National Register of Historic Places listings in Ada County, Idaho
