= Garfield School (Boise, Idaho) =

- U.S. National Register of Historic Places
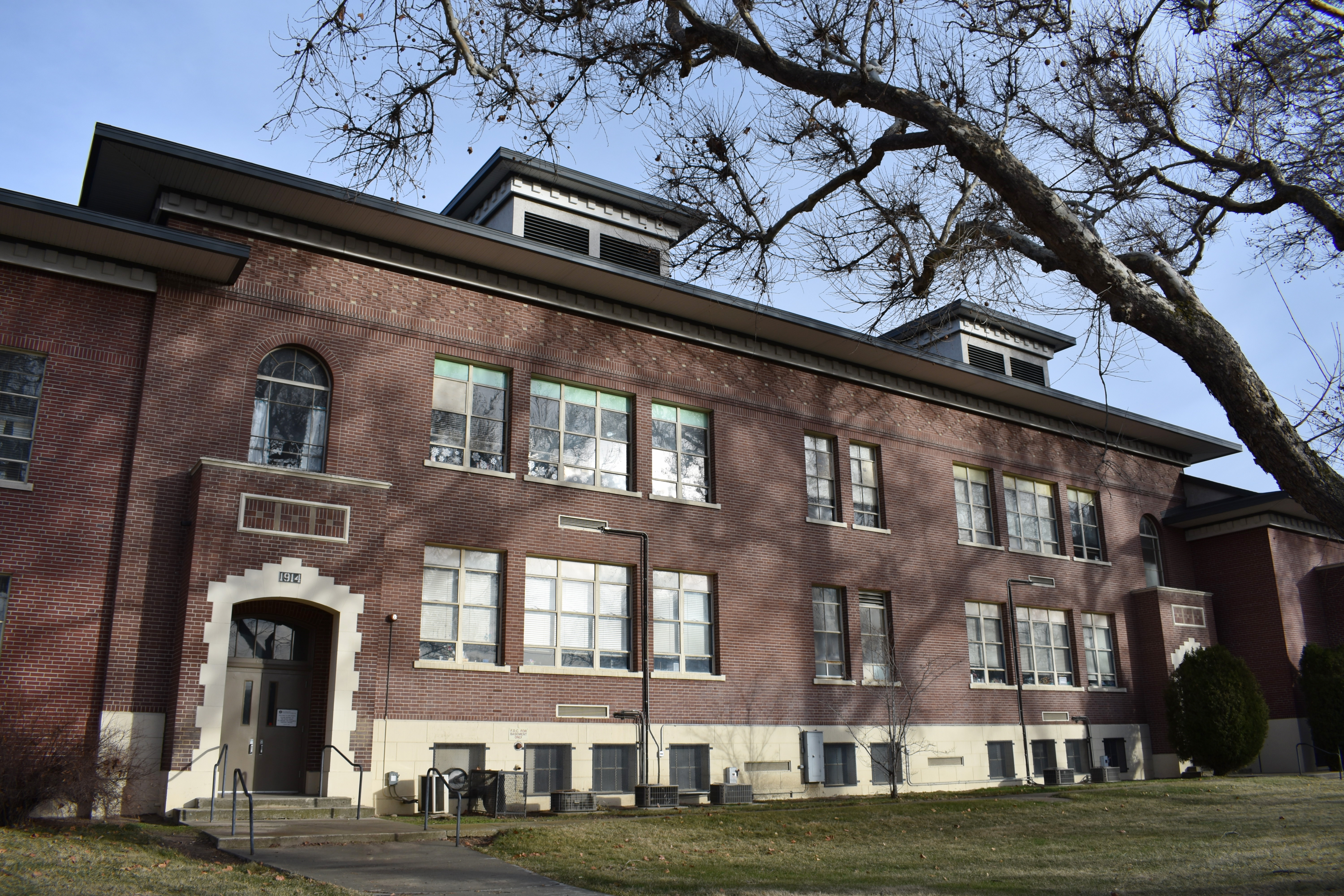
- Garfield School in 2019

- Location within Idaho Location within the United States
- Location: 1914 Broadway Ave., Boise, Idaho
- Coordinates: 43°35′23″N 116°11′33″W
- Area: 8 acres (3.2 ha)
- Built: 1929
- Built by: J.O. Jordan & Sons
- Architect: Tourtellotte & Hummel
- Architectural style: Tudor Revival
- MPS: Boise Public Schools TR
- NRHP reference No.: 82000204
- Added to NRHP: November 8, 1982

Garfield School in Boise, Idaho, is a 2-story, flat roof brick building designed by Tourtellotte & Hummel and constructed in 1929. The 1929 facade is symmetrical and shows a Tudor Revival influence, and shallow arch entries at north and south ends of the building are prominent features of the Broadway Avenue exposure. The brick cornice is inset with a diamond pattern. In 1949 the elementary school was expanded with north and south wings containing additional classrooms and an auditorium. The expansion is compatible with the original structure, and the building was listed on the National Register of Historic Places in 1982.

== History ==
A school had existed in South Boise from 1873, and the building was approximately one mile east of the present site of Garfield School. The wood frame building was heated by a potbelly stove which caused a fire that destroyed the school in 1889. In 1890 the first Garfield School was constructed at the northeast corner of Broadway and Barber Road (Boise Avenue), and it was named for recently assassinated President Garfield. The name was chosen by J.H. Gallaher in exchange for his donation of a school bell. Garfield School was replaced by a brick school, also named Garfield, in 1899. The 1890 and 1899 Garfield Schools were constructed on land originally known as the Ryan Homestead, later owned by Gallaher, and the schools were part of the Gallaher Addition. Garfield School was a stop on the 1905 Interurban Railway.

In 1927 enrollment was 264 students at Garfield School, and in 1928 enrollment topped 300 students. By 1928 more than 100 children were transported from South Boise to schools north of the Boise River, partly because of overcrowded conditions at Garfield, and the school district had already begun construction of Whitney School and had begun an expansion of Lowell School.

The architectural firm of Tourtellotte & Hummel was awarded the design contract for a new South Boise school to be built on the southeast corner of Boise Avenue & Broadway, across from the original Garfield, and their plans included a 2-story, 8-classroom building with a basement auditorium. The building was designed to enable future expansion. The South Boise parent teacher association (PTA) was given naming rights, and after some discussion the PTA chose the name, "Garfield." Contractor J.O. Jordan & Sons received the construction contract. The new building was completed in January, 1930, and it opened with an enrollment of 365 students, but the school district continued to rely on the old building for classrooms, lunch room, and music room.

The two buildings became known informally as old Garfield and new Garfield. In 1949 new Garfield was expanded with 13 additional classrooms, new offices, and a new auditorium. J.O. Jordan & Sons received the building contract. A plan to demolish old Garfield, realign Garfield Street, and build a city park near new Garfield was advanced by the school board in 1950. Old Garfield was demolished later that year, although a city park was not constructed.
