= Turner Hotel =

- U.S. National Register of Historic Places
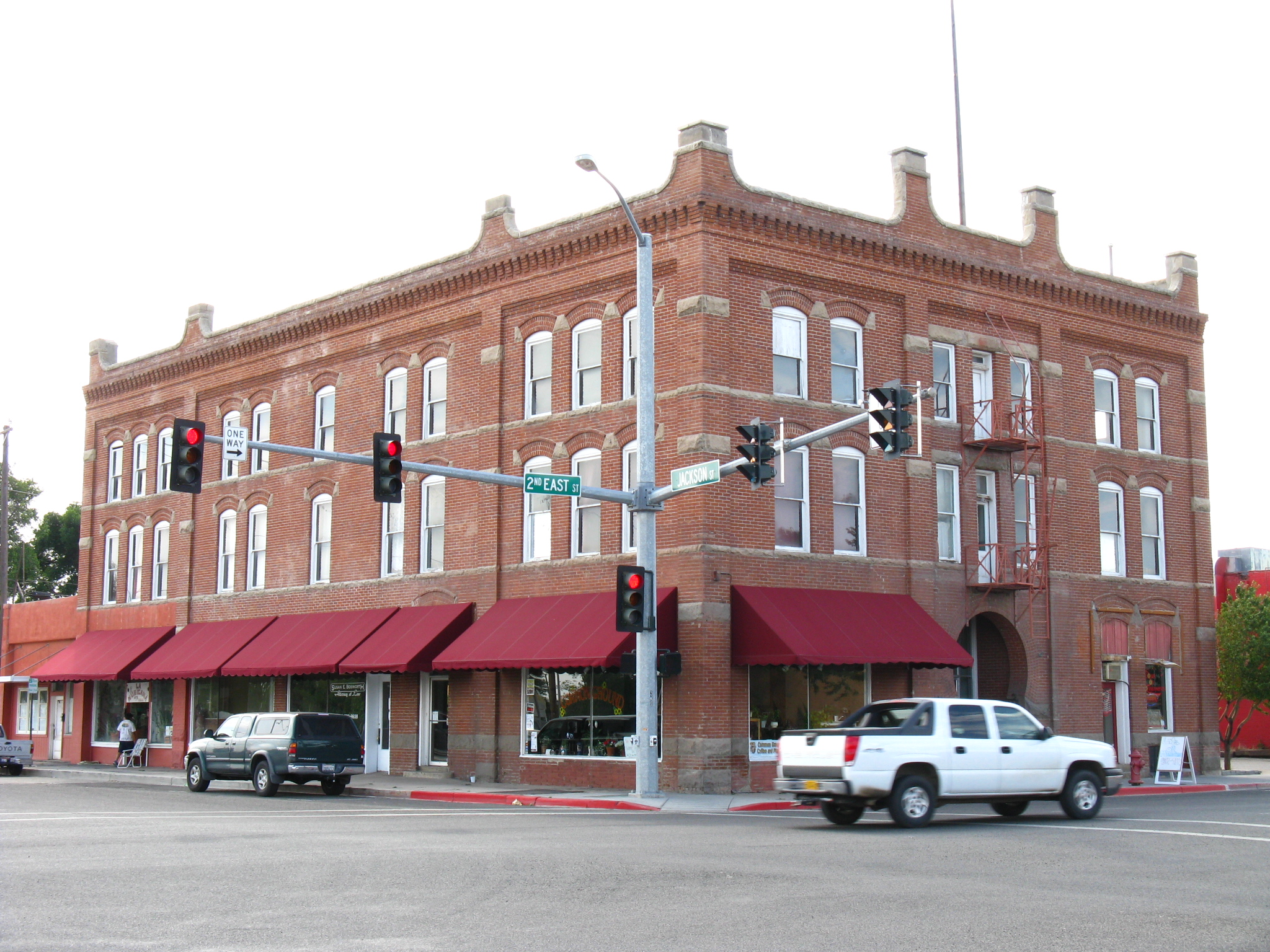

- Location within Idaho Location within the United States
- Location: 140-170 E. Jackson St., Mountain Home, Idaho
- Coordinates: 43°07′52″N 115°41′36″W
- Area: less than one acre
- Built: 1899-1900
- Architect: W. S. Campbell
- NRHP reference No.: 84001124
- Added to NRHP: September 7, 1984

The Turner Hotel, at 140-170 E. Jackson St. in Mountain Home, Idaho, was built in 1899. It was listed on the National Register of Historic Places in 1984.

It is a three-story flat-roofed commercial block building, seven bays long along its east side and 11 bays long along its south side.

It was designed by Boise architect W. S. Campbell and built for W. J. Turner, who had opened the Turner House restaurant and hotel in Mountain Home in 1883. This second hotel building, near the original Turner House, was built during 1899–1900.

It has also been known as the Mellen Building, for Thomas Mellen, a miner and sheepraiser who bought the hotel in 1913.
