= Roosevelt School (Boise, Idaho) =

- U.S. National Register of Historic Places
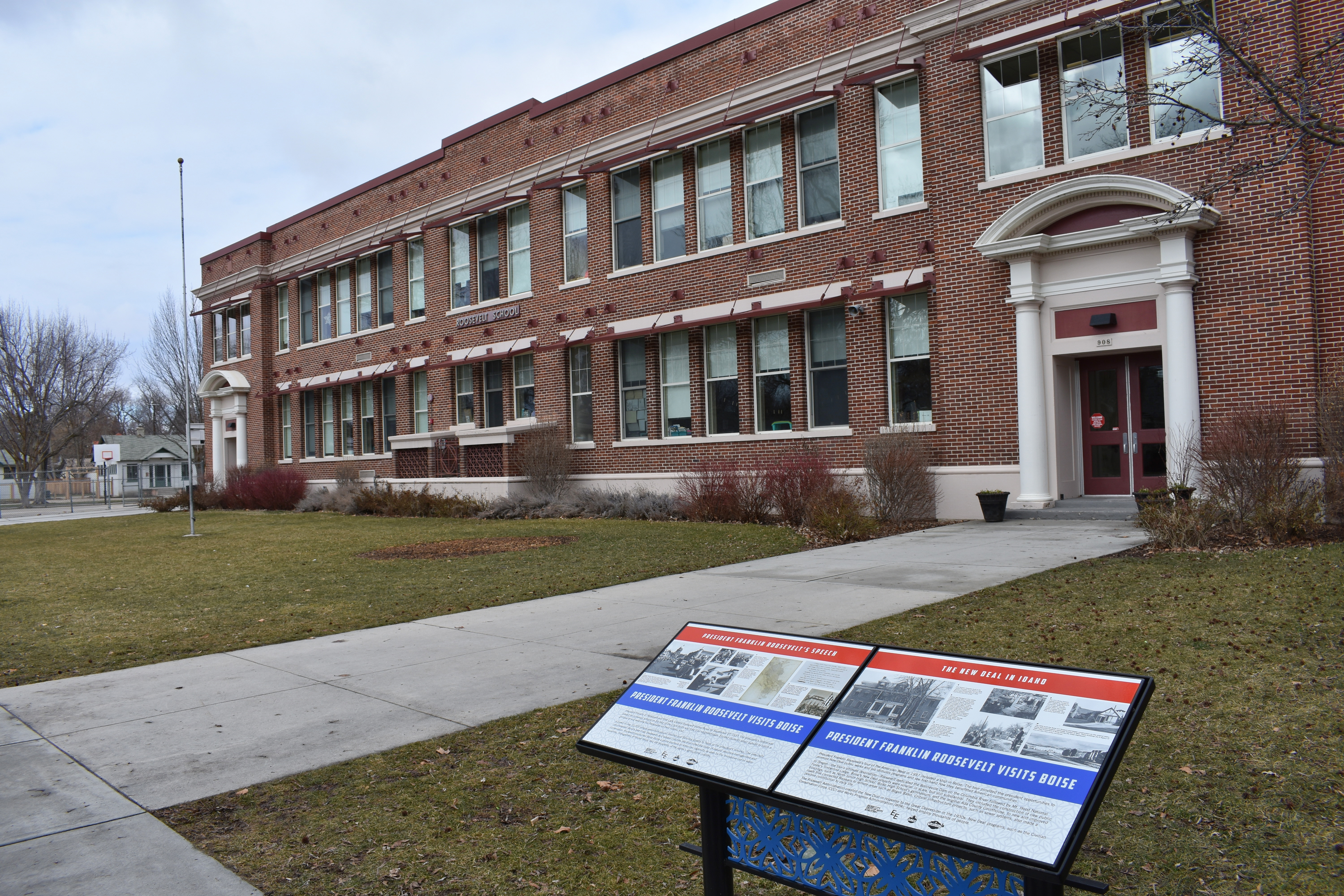
- Roosevelt School in 2019

- Location within Idaho Location within the United States
- Location: 908 E. Jefferson St., Boise, Idaho
- Coordinates: 43°36′36″N 116°10′54″W
- Area: 1.8 acres (0.73 ha)
- Built: 1919
- Built by: O.W. Allen
- Architect: Wayland & Fennell
- Architectural style: Classical Revival
- MPS: Boise Public Schools TR
- NRHP reference No.: 82000236
- Added to NRHP: November 8, 1982

Roosevelt School in Boise, Idaho, is a 2-story, brick and concrete elementary school designed by Wayland & Fennell and constructed by O.W. Allen in 1919. The building features Classical Revival design elements and a flat roof with a parapet above a horizontal course of decorative concrete.

The 1919 design included eight classrooms, office, library, auditorium, and gymnasium. The building required 450,000 bricks. In 1946 a 4-room expansion was added to the east side, and a 3-room expansion was added in 1951.
