= St. James' Episcopal Mission Church =

Historic church in Idaho, United States

- U.S. National Register of Historic Places
- Location within Idaho Location within the United States
- Location: Reynolds St. (Old Co. Hwy. 91), Dubois, Idaho
- Coordinates: 44°10′32″N 112°13′35″W
- Area: 0.4 acres (0.16 ha)
- Built: 1904
- Architect: Wayland & Fennell
- Architectural style: Gothic Revival
- NRHP reference No.: 93000387
- Added to NRHP: May 14, 1993

The St. James' Episcopal Mission Church (also St. Peter's Catholic Mission Church and Heritage Hall.) on Reynolds St. (Old Co. Hwy. 91) in Dubois, Idaho was built in 1904. It is a gable-front Gothic Revival church. It was designed by architects Wayland & Fennell. It was listed on the National Register of Historic Places in 1993.

In 2017, the building was renamed to the Heritage Hall Museum.
