= CSHQA =

American architectural firm

Wayland & Fennell CSHQA

Practice information
- Founders: W. S. Campbell
- Founded: 1889
- Location: Boise, Idaho

Website
- www.cshqa.com

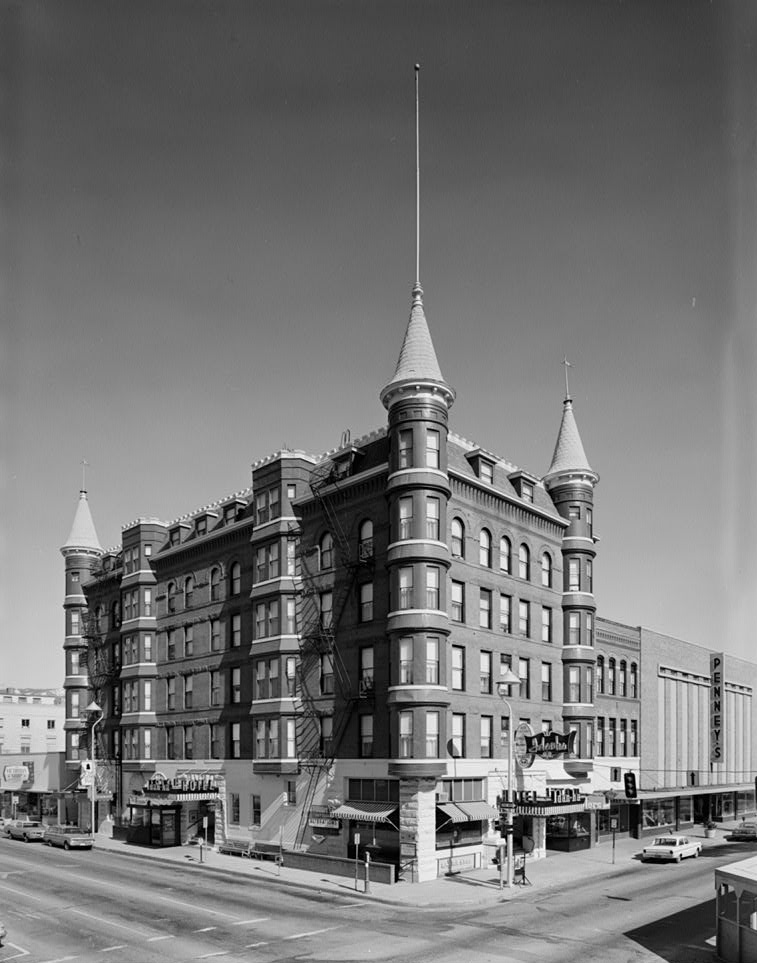
The Idanha Hotel in Boise, designed by W. S. Campbell and completed in 1901.

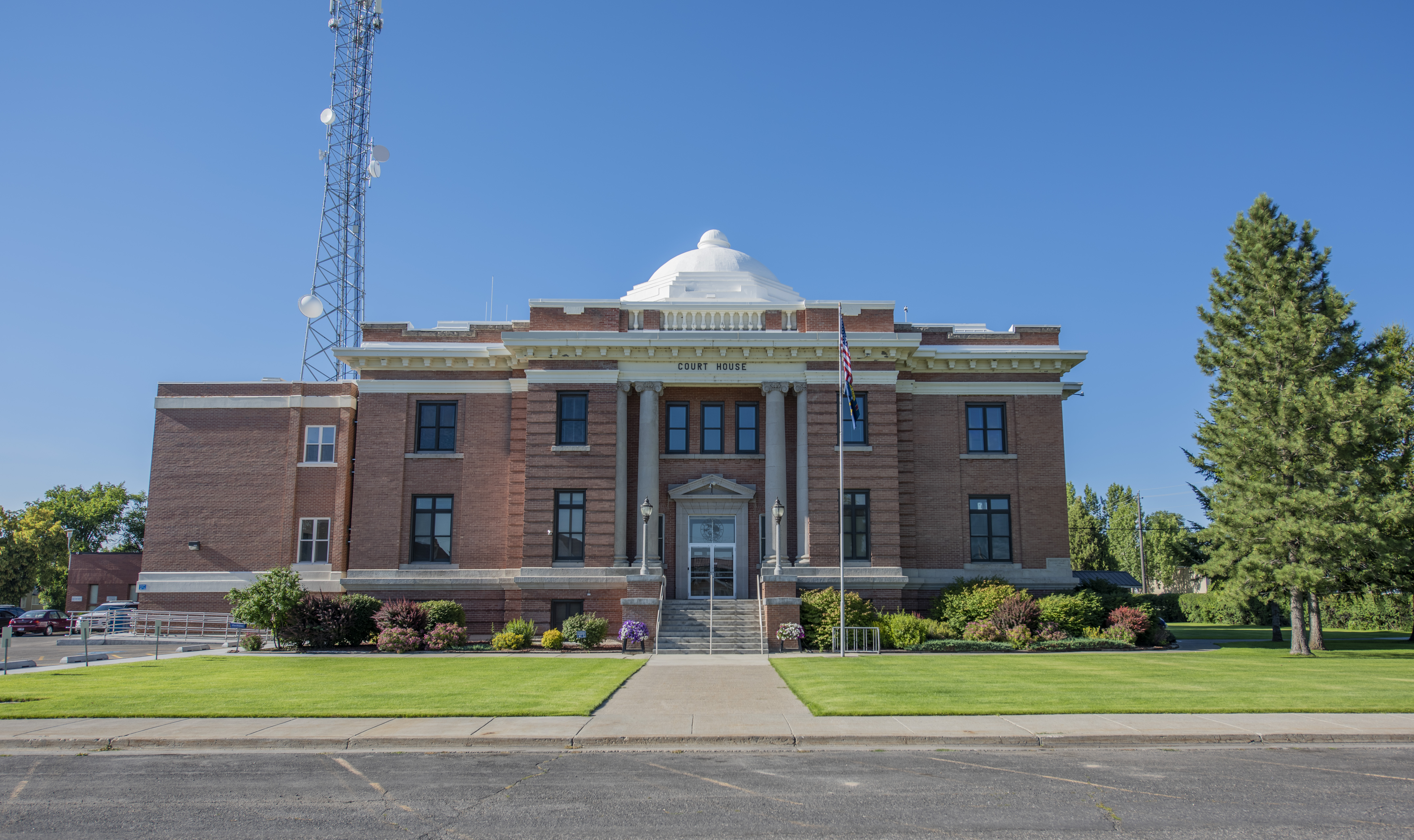
The Fremont County Courthouse in St. Anthony, designed by Wayland & Fennell and completed in 1909.

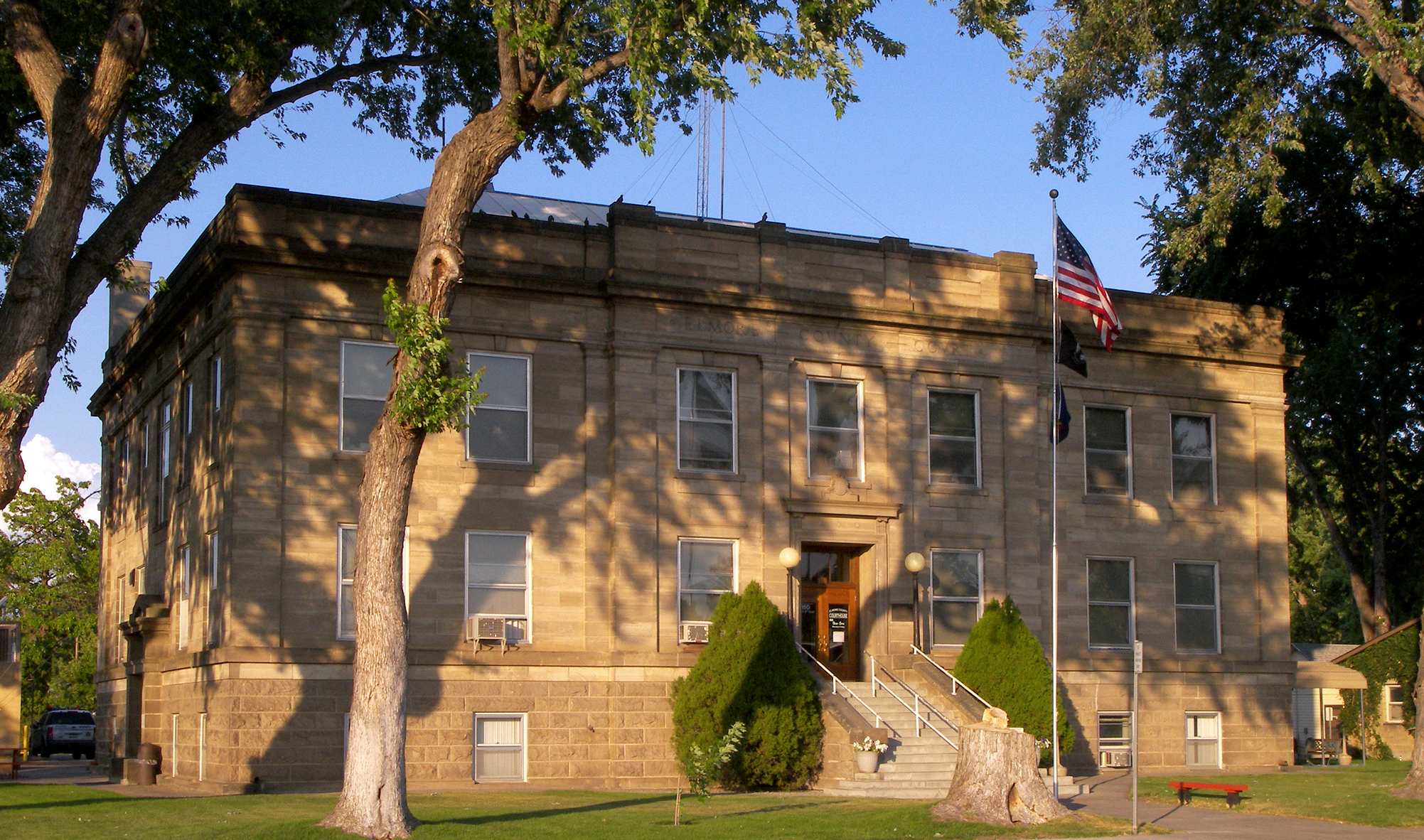
The Elmore County Courthouse in Mountain Home, designed by Wayland & Fennell and completed in 1916.

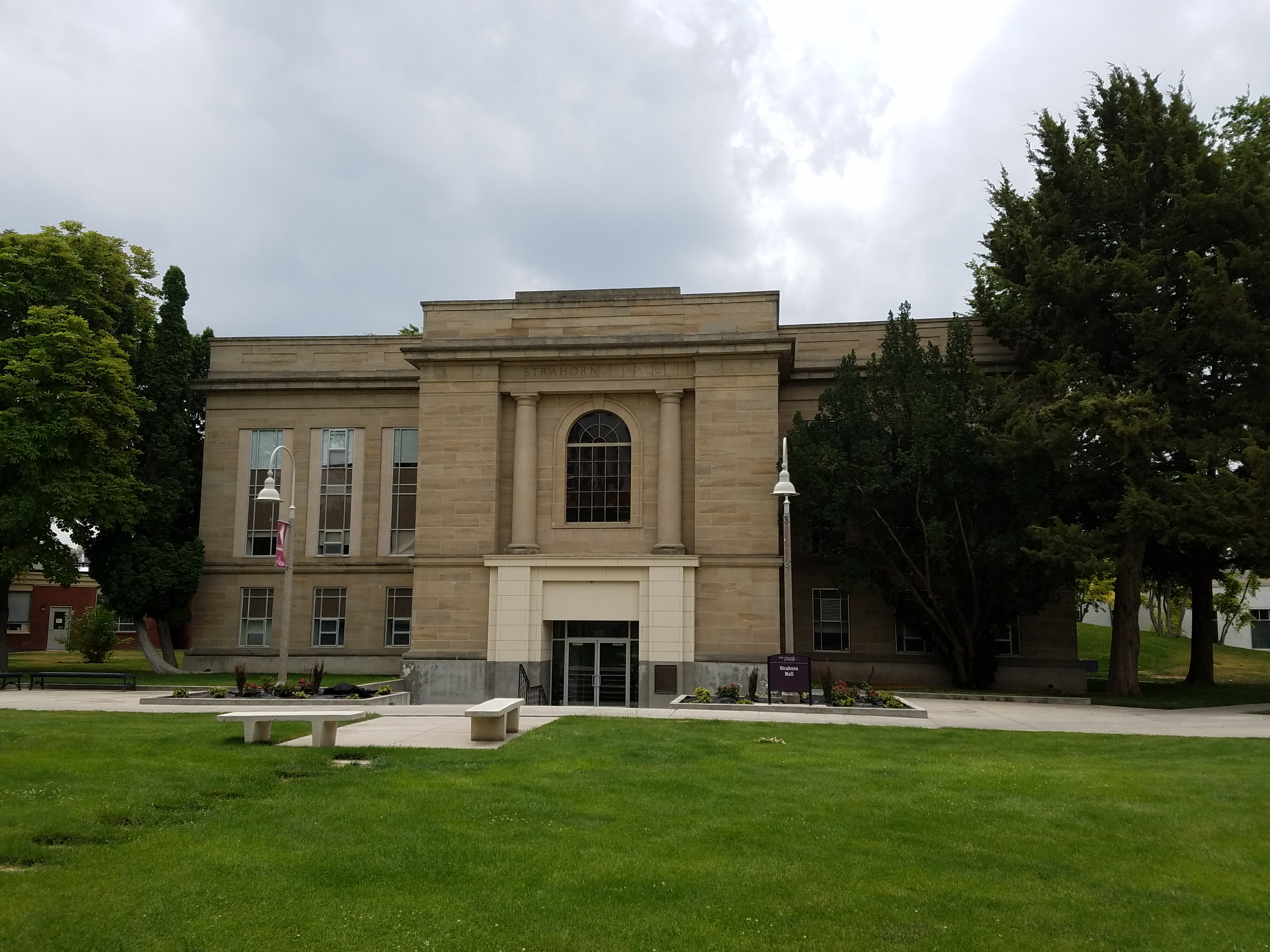
The former Carrie Adell Strahorn Memorial Library, now Strahorn Hall, of the College of Idaho, designed by Wayland & Fennell and completed in 1926.

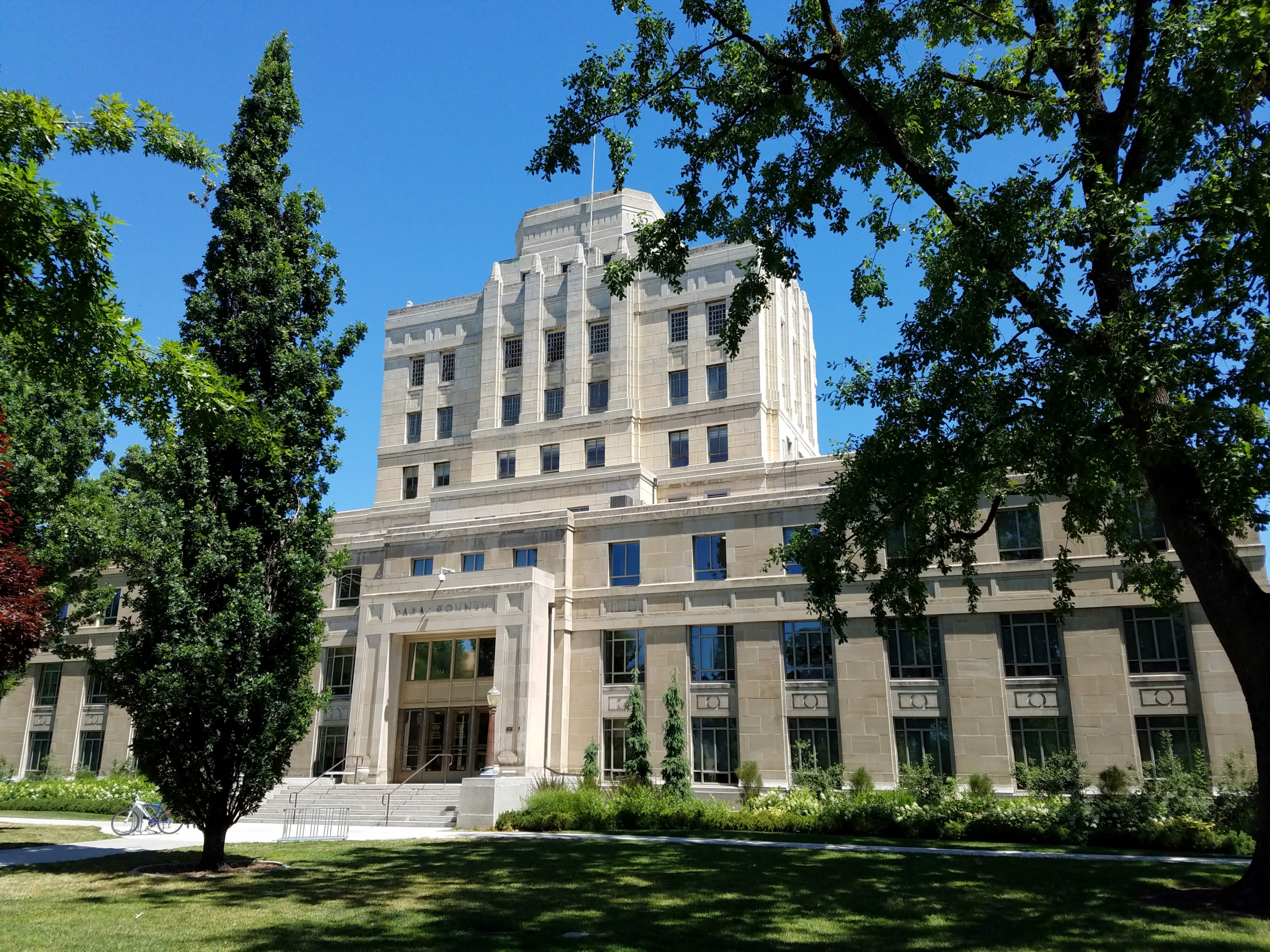
The former Ada County Courthouse in Boise, designed by Wayland & Fennell with Tourtellotte & Hummel and completed in 1939.

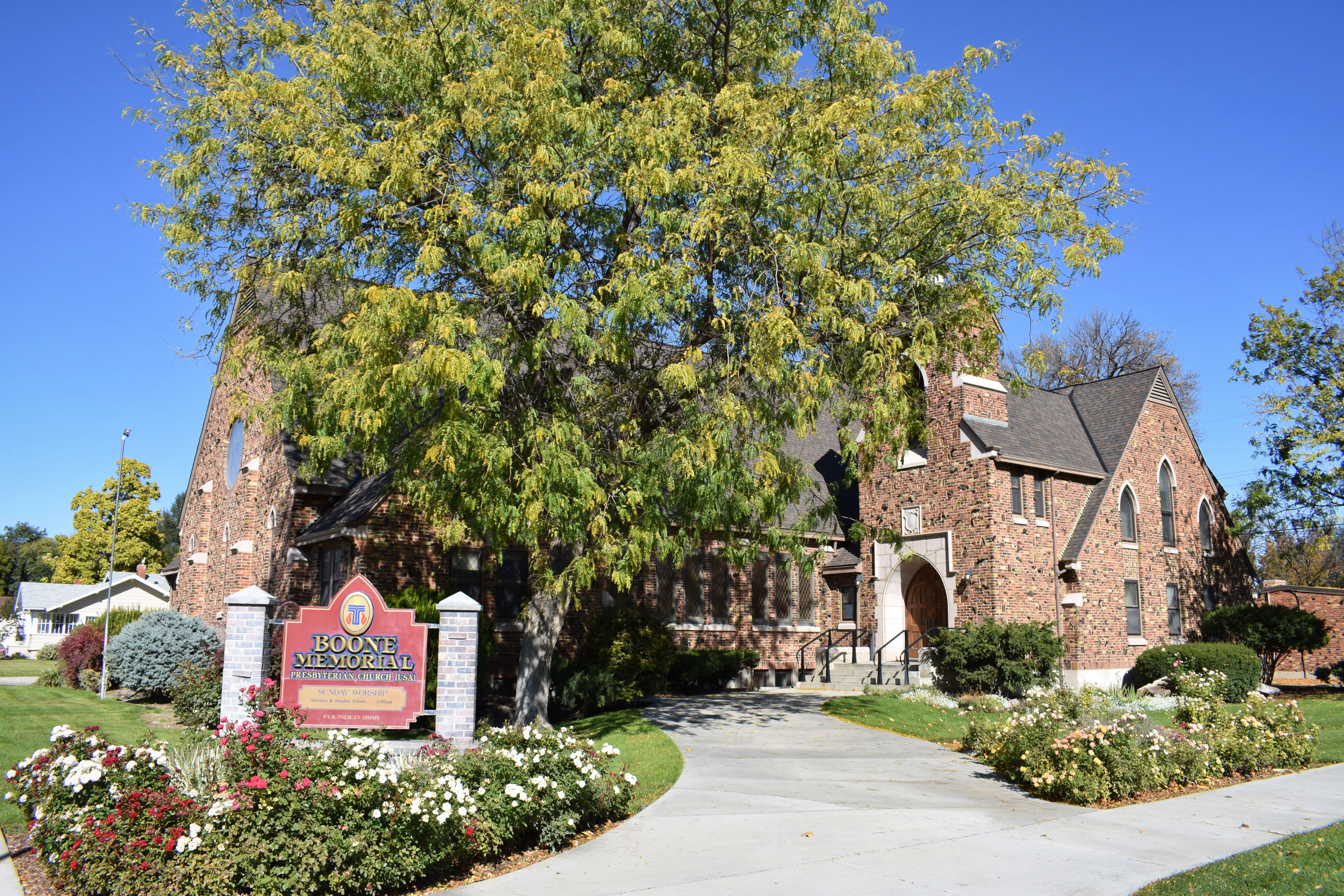
The Boone Memorial Presbyterian Church in Caldwell, designed by Wayland & Fennell and completed in 1948.

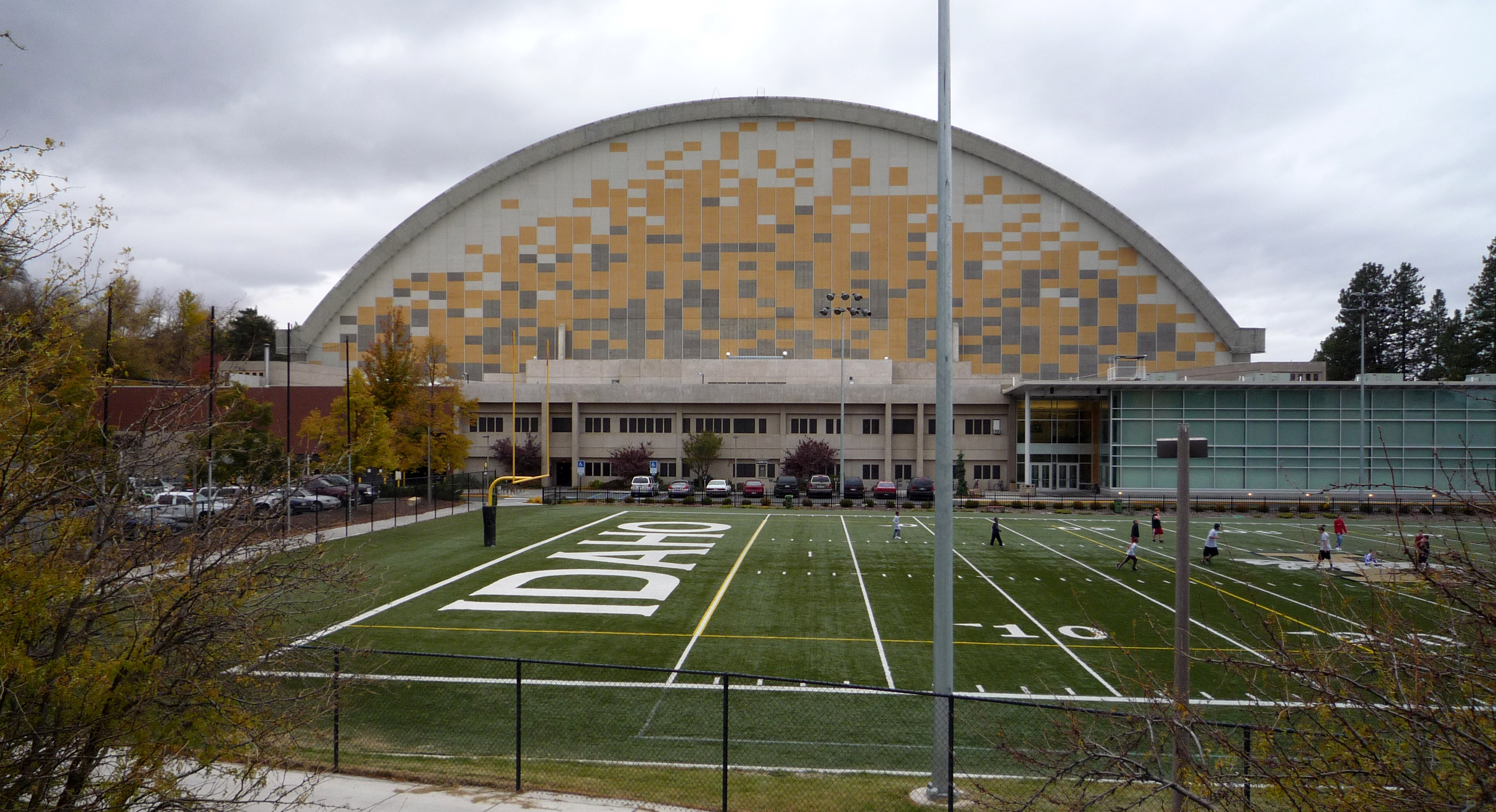
The Kibbie Dome of the University of Idaho, designed by Cline, Smull, Hamill, Shaw & Associates and completed in 1975. Shown prior to later alterations, completed in 2011.

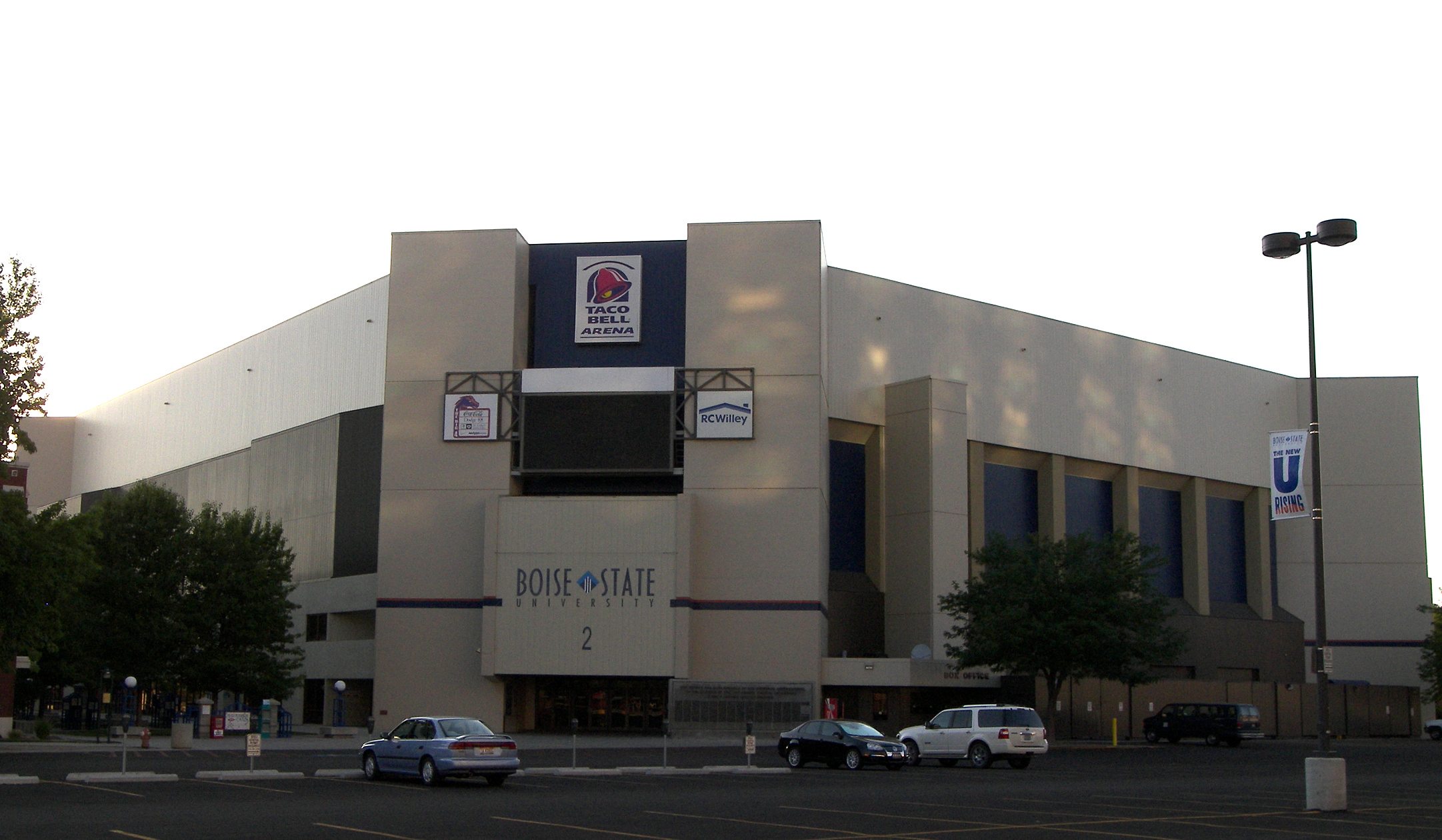
The ExtraMile Arena of Boise State University, designed by Cline Smull Hamill Quintieri Associates and completed in 1982.

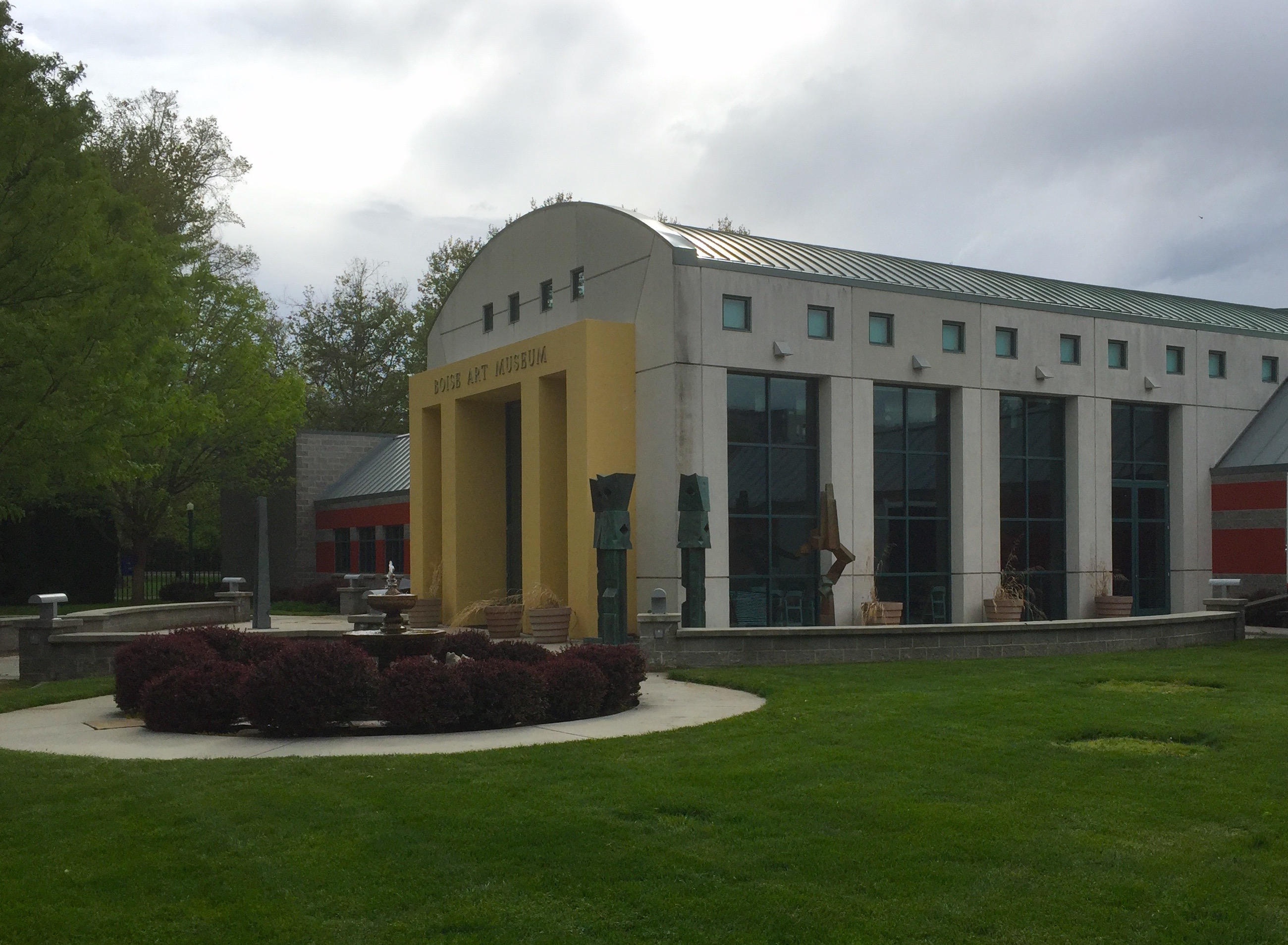
The sculpture court of the Boise Art Museum, designed by CSHQA and completed in 1998.

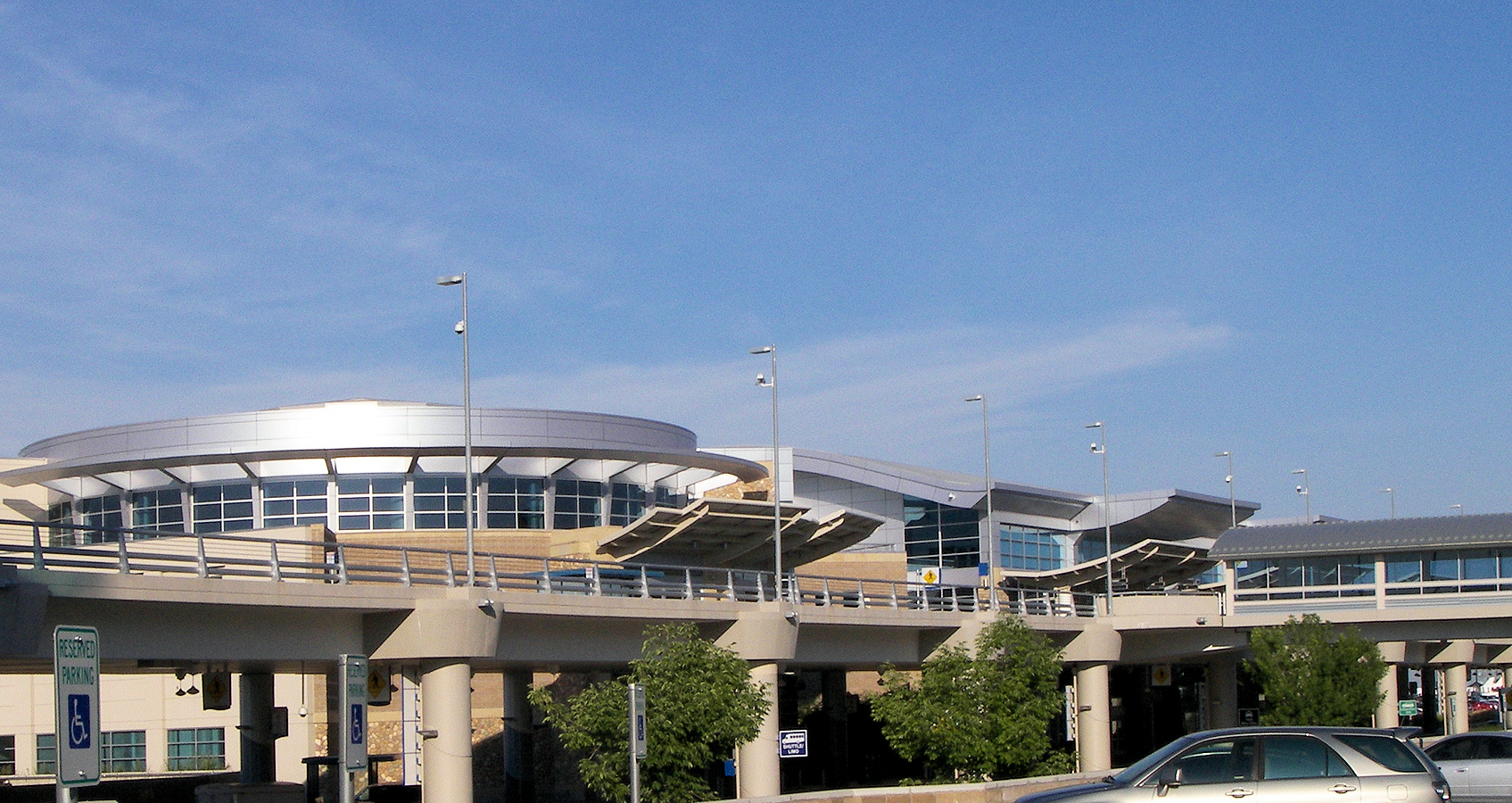
The terminal at Boise Airport, designed by CSHQA and completed in 2004.

CSHQA is a full-service design firm in the western United States specializing in architecture, engineering and interior design. Established 136 years ago in 1889 in Boise, Idaho, CSHQA is now one of the northwest's architectural and engineering firms, with projects nationwide. Many of their works are listed on the U.S. National Register of Historic Places.

== History ==
CSHQA began in 1889 as a one-man, one-room office when W. S. Campbell, a Scotsman educated in Edinburgh, moved to Boise to practice architecture. He worked independently until March of 1892, when he formed the partnership of Campbell & Hodgson with Isaac Hodgson Jr., son and former partner of Isaac Hodgson. The partnership was responsible for the David C. Chase House (1892) in Payette and had been dissolved by October of the same year. Campbell's independent works include the Turner Hotel (1899) and the Idanha Hotel (1901).

In 1901 Campbell, in association with two contractors, was awarded the contract to build the new Boise federal building. In 1902, while construction of the federal building was ongoing, he formed the partnership of Campbell & Wayland with Charles W. Wayland, a drafter in his office. Work on the federal building progressed slowly, and by 1904 the project was a year behind schedule. In March of that year Campbell left on a planned business trip regarding the federal building, but vanished and was presumed missing. Two weeks later he turned up in Scotland with no plans to return. Wayland dissolved the partnership and formed that of Wayland & Fennell with James A. Fennell.

As years passed and more architects joined the firm, the name changed to reflect the additional partners. In 1979, it was known as Cline Smull Hamill Quintieri Associates and in 1985 it was shortened to CSHQA.

In addition to the Boise headquarters, the firm has offices in Sacramento and Denver.

== Innovation and sustainable design ==
CSHQA has been a leader in energy efficiency since the 1970s, receiving recognition for Boise's Amity Elementary School, which appeared on a 1979 cover of Time for its forward-thinking design. This earth-covered school is situated above ground but covered by 2 feet (0.6 m) of earth, with lawn and shrubs growing on top. Solar panels and other energy-efficient elements were also included in the design.

In 1985, the firm received international acclaim for building the energy-efficient Liberty Elementary School in Boise introduced energy-saving concepts such as solar energy and controllable electronics that took advantage of daylighting. The revolutionary design also entailed berming the earth up to the window sills to conserve energy needed for heating and cooling the building.

CSHQA began membership in the U.S. Green Building Council in 2001. Some of the firm's LEED Certified projects include the Chobani Office Building and Global R&D Center, the CSHQA Boise headquarters, and the Klamath Falls Armed Forces Reserve Center.

CSHQA has also designed several Whole Foods Markets which have been awarded Green Globes by the Green Building Initiative.

== Legacy ==
At least thirteen buildings designed by Campbell and Wayland & Fennell have been listed on the United States National Register of Historic Places, and others contribute to listed historic district.

== Partner biographies ==
=== W. S. Campbell ===
William Stewart Campbell (1857 – January 14, 1930) was born in Tillicoultry, Clackmannanshire, Scotland. He was educated at the Trustees' Academy in Edinburgh, later incorporated into the Edinburgh College of Art. He began his career in Canada, later working in Saint Paul and Denver before establishing himself in Boise in 1889. At the time, the only other architect in practice there was James King.

A few years after his return to Scotland, Campbell moved to Edmonton, Alberta, where he initially resumed the practice of architecture, but was discouraged by the cold winters. In 1908 he moved to Vancouver, British Columbia, where he gave up practice and became involved in the dry goods business. In 1912 he was appointed postmaster at Port Mann, where he settled. In the latter years of his life he planned to reestablish his business connections in Boise, where his son had settled. Campbell was married to Minnie Campbell in 1888 in Saint Paul. They had one son, born in Denver. Campbell died in Port Mann at the age of 72. He was buried in Boise.

=== Charles W. Wayland ===
Charles William Wayland AIA (December 8, 1873 – December 9, 1953) was born in Boston. His family moved to Duluth, Minnesota when he was fourteen years old. He was educated in the Duluth public schools and worked as a drafter in Duluth and Butte, Montana until 1900, when he joined Campbell's office in Boise.

Wayland was a member of local fraternal organizations and of the American Institute of Architects, which he joined in 1952, the year after a local chapter was established. Wayland was married to Daisy McConnell in 1903, with whom he had two children, both sons. He died in Boise at the age of 80.

=== James A. Fennell ===
James Alfred Fennell (October 2, 1874 – December 31, 1941) was born in Linden, California. He was educated at the California School of Design, the predecessor of the San Francisco Art Institute. He worked as a drafter for architects Alexander F. Oakey in San Francisco and William White in Butte, Montana until 1900, when he formed the partnership of Fennell & Gove in Butte with George Gove. This was dissolved in 1903 and Fennell practiced independently in Butte until 1904, when he joined Wayland in Boise.

Like Wayland, Fennell was a member of the local fraternal organizations. He was also interested in the development of the arts in Boise. He was an amateur artist and in 1931 was among the founders of the Boise Art Association. He was responsible for the design of its building, the Boise Gallery of Art (1937), now the Boise Art Museum. He was married twice, first to Beulah D. Browning and second to Ernestine Hill. He had no children. He died in Boise at the age of 67.

== Selected projects ==
=== Campbell & Hodgson, 1892 ===
- 1892 – David C. Chase House, (Note: NRHP-listed.) 307 N 9th St, Payette, Idaho

=== W. S. Campbell, 1892–1902 ===
- 1899 – Telephone Building, (Note: A contributing resource to the Boise Historic District, NRHP-listed in 1977.) 609 W Main St, Boise, Idaho
- 1899 – Turner Hotel, 140-170 E Jackson St, Mountain Home, Idaho
- 1901 – Roger M. Davidson house, (Note: A contributing resource to the Warm Springs Avenue Historic District, NRHP-listed in 1980.) 1205 E Warm Springs Ave, Boise, Idaho
- 1901 – Idanha Hotel, 928 W Main St, Boise, Idaho

=== Campbell & Wayland, 1902–1904 ===
- 1903 – Cole School, (Note: Demolished. Formerly NRHP-listed.) 7415 Fairview Ave, Boise, Idaho
- 1903 – John K. Enboe house, 1419 E Warm Springs Ave, Boise, Idaho

=== Wayland & Fennell, 1904–1955 ===
- 1904 – Albert B. Kohny duplex, (Note: A contributing resource to the West Warm Springs Historic District, NRHP-listed in 1977.) 209 Main St, Boise, Idaho
- 1904 – John P. Tate building, (Note: A contributing resource to the Lower Main Street Commercial Historic District, NRHP-listed in 1980.) 1102 Main St, Boise, Idaho
- 1904 – Whipple Block, (Note: Demolished. Formerly a contributing resource to the Lower Main Street Commercial Historic District, NRHP-listed in 1980.) 1106 Main St, Boise, Idaho
- 1905 – Idaho Building, (Note: Demolished.) Lewis and Clark Centennial Exposition, Portland, Oregon
- 1905 – St. James' Episcopal Mission Church, Reynolds St, Dubois, Idaho
- 1906 – J. E. Clinton house, 1037 E Warm Springs Ave, Boise, Idaho
- 1906 – Longfellow School, 1511 N 9th St, Boise, Idaho
- 1907 – Frank Garver house, (Note: A contributing resource to the Fort Street Historic District, NRHP-listed in 1982.) 1018 W Hays St, Boise, Idaho
- 1907 – Mrs. A. M. Harvey duplex, 1301-1303 W Hays St, Boise, Idaho
- 1907 – L. L. Ormsby house, 101 E Warm Springs Ave, Boise, Idaho
- 1907 – Bishop Daniel S. Tuttle House, 512 N 8th St, Boise, Idaho
- 1908 – Unitarian Church (former), 817 W Franklin St, Boise, Idaho
- 1909 – Jack Skillern house, 915 E Warm Springs Ave, Boise, Idaho
- 1909 – Fremont County Courthouse, 151 W 1st St N, St. Anthony, Idaho
- 1909 – B. W. Walker house, 1104 E Warm Springs Ave, Boise, Idaho
- 1910 – F. F. Johnson house, 1312 E Warm Springs Ave, Boise, Idaho
- 1910 – Larson Building, 1011 Main St, Boise, Idaho
- 1910 – Nampa City Hall, 203 12th Ave S, Nampa, Idaho
- 1910 – Tiner Building, 1010 Main St, Boise, Idaho
- 1910 – Charles W. Wayland house, 1510 W Hays St, Boise, Idaho
- 1911 – C. A. Carter house, (Note: A contributing resource to the Harrison Boulevard Historic District, NRHP-listed in 1980.) 907 N Harrison Blvd, Boise, Idaho
- 1912 – Twin Falls High School, (Note: Demolished. Formerly a contributing resource to the Twin Falls City Park Historic District, NRHP-listed in 1978.) Shoshone St N and N 6th Ave, Twin Falls, Idaho
- 1913 – Carl J. Hill house, 916 E Warm Springs Ave, Boise, Idaho
- 1916 – Baugh Building, (Note: A contributing resource to the Twin Falls Downtown Historic District, NRHP-listed in 2000.) 102 Main Ave N, Twin Falls, Idaho
- 1916 – Charles O. Davidson house, 945 E Warm Springs Ave, Boise, Idaho
- 1916 – Elmore County Courthouse, 150 S 4th St, Mountain Home, Idaho
- 1916 – Idaho Falls Public Library (former), 200 N Eastern Ave, Idaho Falls, Idaho
- 1919 – Craig Coffin house, 829 E Warm Springs Ave, Boise, Idaho
- 1919 – Charles Rathbun house, 1615 E Warm Springs Ave, Boise, Idaho
- 1919 – Roosevelt School, 908 E Jefferson St, Boise, Idaho
- 1920 – J. H. Richards house, 1601 N Harrison Blvd, Boise, Idaho
- 1923 – Remodeling of the Hopffgarten House, 1115 W Boise Ave, Boise, Idaho
- 1925 – Frank H. Parsons house, 1127 E Warm Springs Ave, Boise, Idaho
- 1926 – Carrie Adell Strahorn Memorial Library, College of Idaho, Caldwell, Idaho
- 1926 – Whitney School, 1609 S Owyhee St, Boise, Idaho
- 1928 – Idaho Power Substation, Van Buren St and Filer Ave, Twin Falls, Idaho
- 1937 – Boise Art Museum, (Note: Designed principally by James A. Fennell. Extant but obscured by later additions.) 670 Julia Davis Dr, Boise, Idaho
- 1939 – Ada County Courthouse (former), (Note: Designed by Tourtellotte & Hummel and Wayland & Fennell, associated architects, but principally designed by Wayland & Fennell. A contributing resource to the Boise Capitol Area District, NRHP-listed in 1976.) 514 W Jefferson St, Boise, Idaho
- 1940 – Administration Building, (Note: Designed by Tourtellotte & Hummel and Wayland & Fennell, associated architects, but principally designed by Tourtellotte & Hummel. NRHP-listed.) Boise State University, Boise, Idaho
- 1948 – Boone Memorial Presbyterian Church, (Note: A contributing resource to the Caldwell Residential Historic District, NRHP-listed in 2002.) 1323 Dearborn St, Caldwell, Idaho

=== Wayland & Cline, 1955–1961 ===
- 1959 – University Christian Church, 1801 W University Dr, Boise, Idaho
- 1961 – Idaho Transportation Department administration building, (Note: Designed by Hummel, Hummel & Jones and Wayland & Cline, associated architects.) 3311 W State St, Boise, Idaho

=== Wayland, Cline & Smull, 1961–1969 ===
- 1963 – Wallace Residence Center, University of Idaho, Moscow, Idaho
- 1968 – Len B. Jordan Office Building, 650 W State St, Boise, Idaho
- 1969 – Morrison-Knudsen headquarters, 400 S Broadway Ave, Boise, Idaho

=== Cline, Smull, Hamill, Shaw & Associates, 1969–1972 ===
- 1975 – Kibbie Dome, University of Idaho, Moscow, Idaho

=== Cline Smull Hamill Quintieri Associates, 1979–1985 ===
- 1982 – ExtraMile Arena, Boise State University, Boise, Idaho

=== CSHQA, from 1985 ===
- 1989 – Memorial Stadium, 5600 N Glenwood St, Boise, Idaho
- 1998 – Boise Art Museum Expansion, 670 Julia Davis Dr, Boise, Idaho
- 1999 – C. W. Moore Plaza, 250 S 5th St, Boise, Idaho
- 2004 – Tamarack Resort Discovery Center, Donnelly, Idaho
- 2004 – Terminal, Boise Airport, Boise, Idaho
- 2009 – Terminal, Rogue Valley International–Medford Airport, Medford, Oregon
- 2010 – Idaho State Capitol renovation, 700 W Jefferson St, Boise, Idaho
- 2010 – Terminal, Grant County Regional Airport, John Day, Oregon
- 2013 – CSHQA Headquarters, Boise, Idaho
- 2013 – Glanbia Corporate Headquarters and Cheese Innovation Center, Twin Falls, Idaho
- 2017 – Grove Plaza Renovation, Boise, Idaho
- 2018 – University of Idaho Administration Building Historic Renovation, Moscow, Idaho
- 2019 – Chobani Office Building and Global R&D Center, Twin Falls, Idaho
- 2019 – Wyoming State Capitol Restoration, Cheyenne, Wyoming
- 2019 – Idaho Humane Society (IHS) Animal Welfare Campus, Boise, Idaho
- 2020 – WaFd Boise Campus Tenant Improvement, Boise, Idaho
- 2022 – The Warehouse Food Hall, Boise, Idaho
- 2023 – Meridian Library at Orchard Park, Meridian, Idaho
- 2023 – Depot Square, Driggs, Idaho
- 2023 – Treefort Music Hall and Hap Hap Lounge, Boise, Idaho
- 2024 – The Sparrow, Boise, Idaho
- 2024 – Hotel Renegade, Boise, Idaho
- 2024 – Historic U.S. Assay Office Assessment, Rehabilitation & Restoration, Boise, Idaho
