= Lowell Elementary School =

There are a number of Elementary schools named Lowell Elementary School:

- Lowell Elementary School (Lowell, Arkansas)
- Lowell Elementary School (Santa Ana, California)
- Lowell Elementary School (Fresno, California)
- Lowell Elementary School (Boise, Idaho)
- Lowell Elementary School (Wheaton, Illinois)
- Lowell Elementary School (Indianapolis, Indiana)
- Lowell Elementary School (Kansas City, Kansas), listed on the National Register of Historic Places in Wyandotte County
- Lowell Elementary School (Duluth, Minnesota)
- Lowell Elementary School (Seattle, Washington)
- Lowell Elementary School (Long Beach, California)
