= West Warm Springs Historic District =

- U.S. National Register of Historic Places
- U.S. Historic district
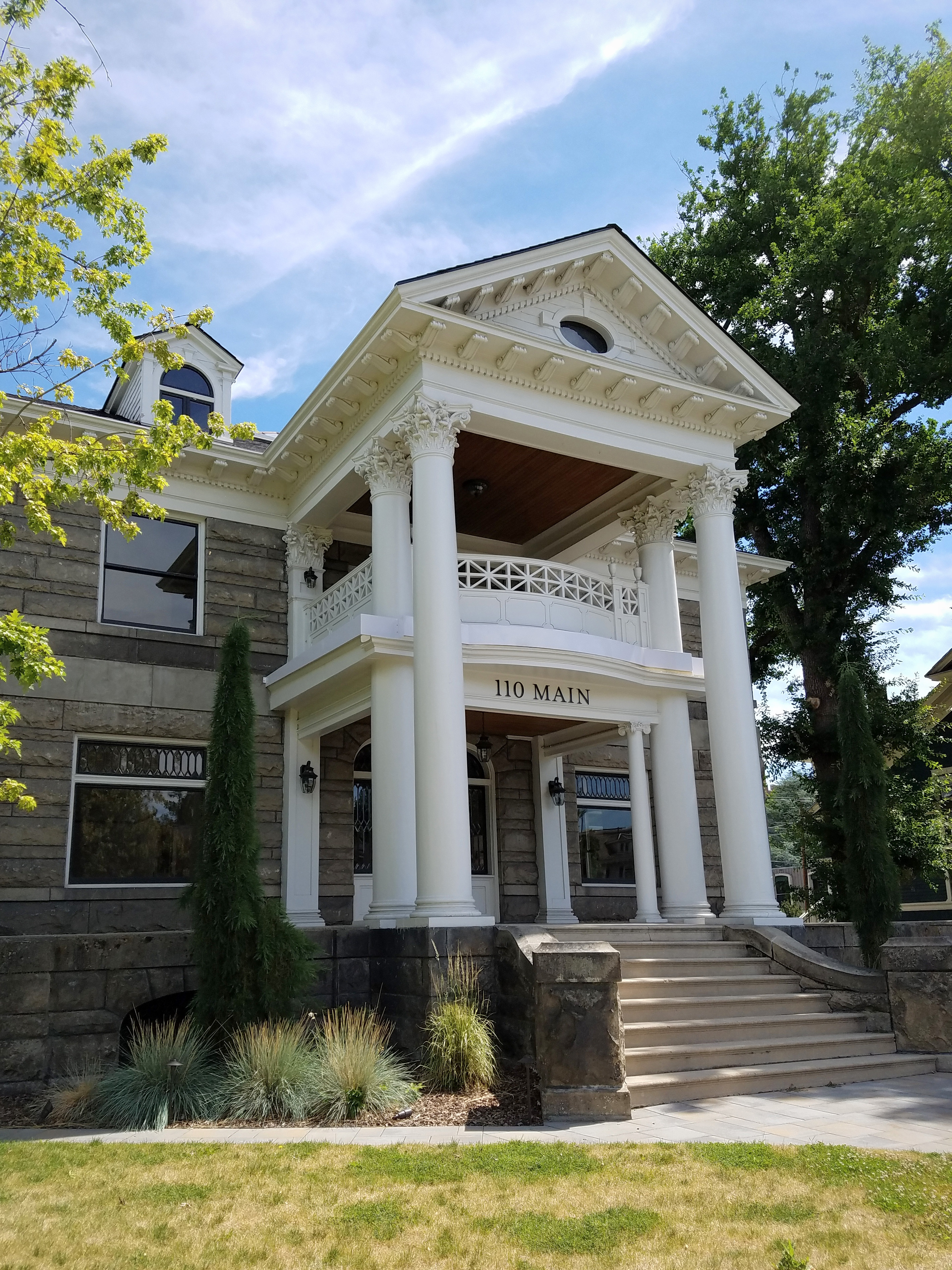
- The Timothy Regan House in 2018

- Location within Idaho Location within the United States
- Location: Warm Springs Ave., Main, 1st, 2nd, and Idaho Sts., Boise, Idaho
- Area: 10 acres (4.0 ha)
- Architect: Tourtellotte & Co.; Wayland & Fennell; and others
- Architectural style: Late 19th And 20th Century Revivals, Queen Anne, Georgian Revival
- NRHP reference No.: 77000451
- Added to NRHP: December 12, 1977

The West Warm Springs Historic District in Boise, Idaho, is a neighborhood of homes of some of Boise's prominent citizens of the late 19th and early 20th centuries. Roughly bounded by W Main St, W Idaho St, N 1st St, and N 2nd St, the district was added to the National Register of Historic Places in 1977 and included 14 properties. Of these original resources, 11 remain in the district.

In August, 2018, the Boise City Council approved an emergency measure to prevent a property owner from demolishing the Eoff-Brady House, also known as the Alfred Eoff House. The city later adopted a preservation ordinance to protect other structures in the district.

== Inventory ==
- Albert B. Kohney House (1904), 209 W Main St, 2 1/2-story Queen Anne designed by Wayland & Fennell. Albert Kohney, also known as Albert Kohny, managed the clothing department of Shainwald Brothers store, and in 1892 he and Sam Weiler purchased the Brownsville Woolen Mills store.
- William E. Northrup House (1892), 203 W Main St, 2 1/2-story Queen Anne designed by Paulsen & Lavelle. William Northrup, also known as William Northrop, worked for Coffin Brothers Hardware at 8th & Main Streets before opening Coffin & Northrop, later the Northrup Hardware Store, at the same location.
- Peter Sonna House (1911), 121 W Main St, 2-story Federal Revival constructed for Mary (Misselt or Kloser) Sonna, widow of former Boise mayor (1893-1895), mercantile owner, and banker Peter Sonna (1835-1907). Although the house is named for Peter Sonna, he died four years before its construction. The house was constructed on the site of the first home of another Boise mayor, John Lemp (1875-1876).
- Anna Bayhouse House (1906), 119 W Main St, 2-story Colonial Revival designed by Charles F. Wood and constructed by H.A. Butt. After the death (1873) of her husband, George Bayhouse, a boot and shoe maker, Anna Bayhouse operated a boarding house at 10th and Grove Streets.
- Jesus Urquides House (1880s), 115 W Main St, demolished. In 1873 Antonio de Ocampo, a mule packer, purchased from city government part of Block 29 in the original Boise City townsite. After de Ocampo's death in 1878, his heir, Don Jesus Urquides, built a one-room house at 115 W Main St and operated a mule packing business at the location. Later Urquides was landlord of a small number of houses on the site, known as Spanish Village or as Pioneerville. The buildings in the village were demolished after a fire in 1971.
- Rufus Fontes Houses (1895), 111 W Main St & 107 W Main St, demolished after a nearby fire in 1971. Rufus Fontes was owner of three lots in Spanish Village and the son of miner, saloon keeper, and mule packer Manuel Fontes.
- Leander L. Ormsby House (1907), 101 E Warm Springs Ave, 2-story Colonial Revival designed by Wayland & Fennell. L.L. Ormsby was a prominent sheep farmer. The Ormsby residence is now a Ronald McDonald House.
- Edgar Wilson House (1904), 103 E Warm Springs Ave, 3-story Tudor Revival designed by Tourtellotte and Hummel. Edgar Wilson was an attorney, banker, president of the Boise Chamber of Commerce, and member of Congress.. It was moved to Eagle by the Leigh family in 1990.
- Victoria Louise Eoff House (1911), 141 E Warm Springs Ave, 3-story Arts and Crafts designed by Tourtellotte and Hummel. Alfred and Victoria Eoff lived nearby in the Alfred Eoff House, and Mrs. Eoff constructed this home after her husband's death. The style was unusual in Boise at the time, and the Idaho Statesman described it as "freakish."
- Henry Falk House (1904), 109 W Idaho St, 2-story Colonial Revival. Henry Falk founded The Mode department store in Boise and was an owner of Falk's department store chain. The Henry Falk House was later owned by Governor Chase Clark, then by Senator Frank Church and Bethine (Clark) Church.
- Alfred Eoff House (1897), 140 W Main St, 3-story Queen Anne designed by John E. Tourtellotte. Alfred Eoff organized the Boise City National Bank and served as cashier. The house was owned later by Governor Brady.
- Timothy Regan House (1905), 110 W Main St, 2-story Colonial Revival designed by Tourtellotte & Co. Timothy M. Regan was an executive of the Boise City National Bank, and he helped to organize the Boise Artesian Hot and Cold Water Co.
- George Leighton House (1892), 100 W Main St, 2-story Queen Anne. The 1892 structure was a 1-story Queen Anne, designed by Walter S. Campbell and constructed for Thomas M. Kerr. The Idaho Statesman described the house as "...a perfect little gem of a cottage..." Kerr was an assistant to Governor Steunenberg. After Kerr was murdered in front of the cottage by a jealous husband, the house was purchased by George Leighton, who undertook a major expansion.
