= Whitney School (Boise, Idaho) =

- U.S. National Register of Historic Places
- Location: 1609 S. Owyhee St., Boise, Idaho
- Area: 8.9 acres (3.6 ha)
- Built: 1926
- Architect: Wayland & Fennell; Tourtellotte & Hummel
- MPS: Boise Public Schools TR
- NRHP reference No.: 82000255
- Added to NRHP: November 8, 1982

The Whitney School was a historic school in Boise, Idaho. It was placed on the National Register of Historic Places in 1982, and was demolished in 2008.

The school was originally built in 1926 to plans by Wayland & Fennell of Boise, replaced a building that had burned. Ten years later, in 1936, Tourtellotte & Hummel designed large additions that were built on either end of the central building. A further addition was built in 1946.

All of the sections were designed in a classical style, which helped to unify the sprawling, one-story structure. The building was demolished in 2008 and replaced by the new Whitney School on the same site.
