= Blatchley Hall =

- U.S. National Register of Historic Places
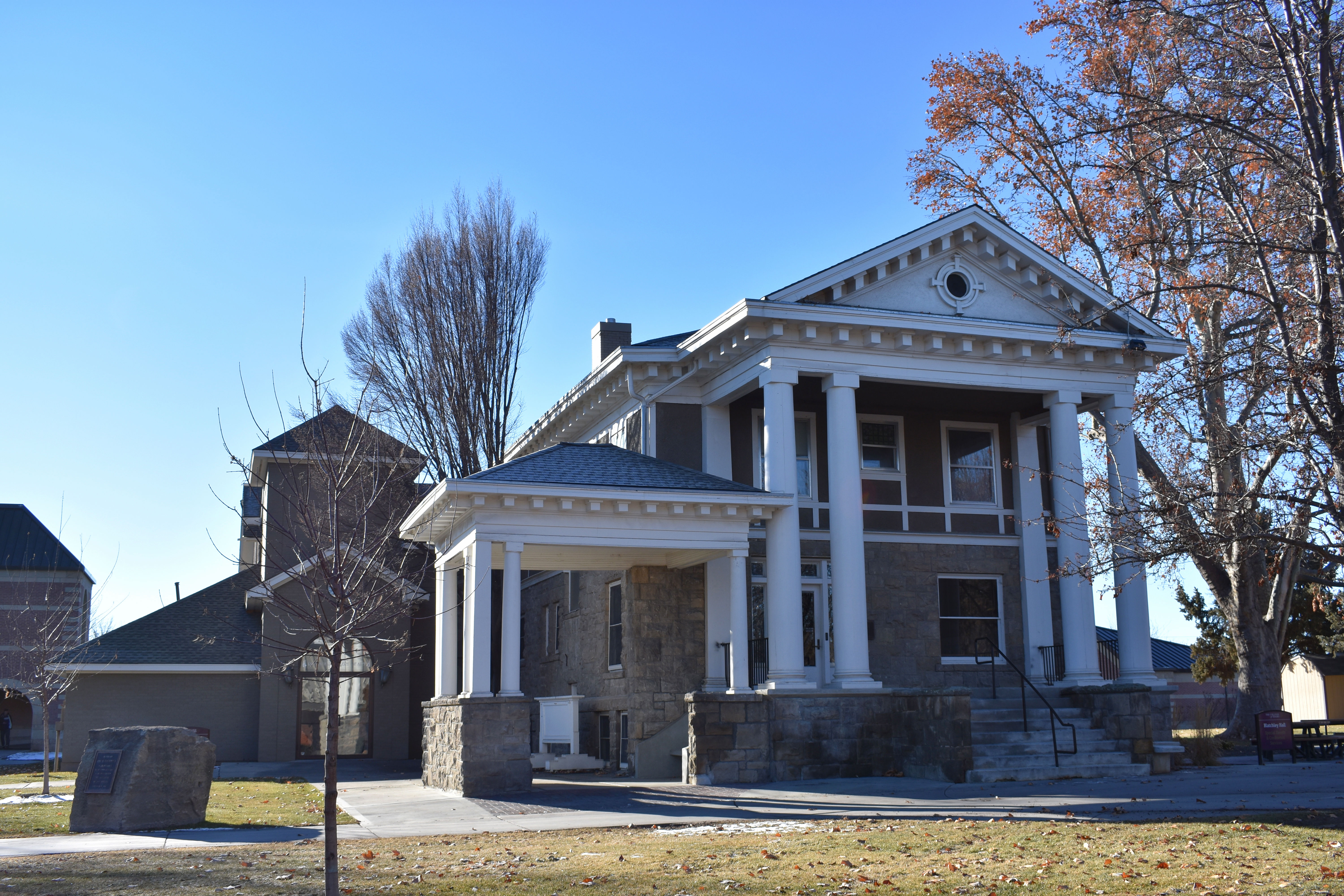
- Blatchley Hall in 2018

- Location within Idaho Location within the United States
- Location: College of Idaho campus, Caldwell, Idaho
- Coordinates: 43°39′9″N 116°40′27″W
- Area: less than one acre
- Built: 1910
- Architectural style: Colonial Revival
- NRHP reference No.: 78001055
- Added to NRHP: March 8, 1978

Blatchley Hall, on the campus of the College of Idaho in Caldwell in Canyon County, Idaho, was built in 1910. It was listed on the National Register of Historic Places in 1978. It was deemed significant as a good "example of the Colonial revival" and for its association with the history of The College of Idaho.

It was home of Henry and Carrie Blatchley, who donated 10 acres (4.0 ha) of land to the campus of the College of Idaho in 1916, with the hope that it would serve as the college president's home. Dr. William Judson Boone, who founded the college in 1891, lived there for a short time. It was later remodeled to serve as a Y.M.C.A. and then again later to serve as the college's music building and art gallery.

== See also ==
- Sterry Hall
- Strahorn Hall
