= North Caldwell Historic District =

Historic district in Idaho, United States

- U.S. National Register of Historic Places
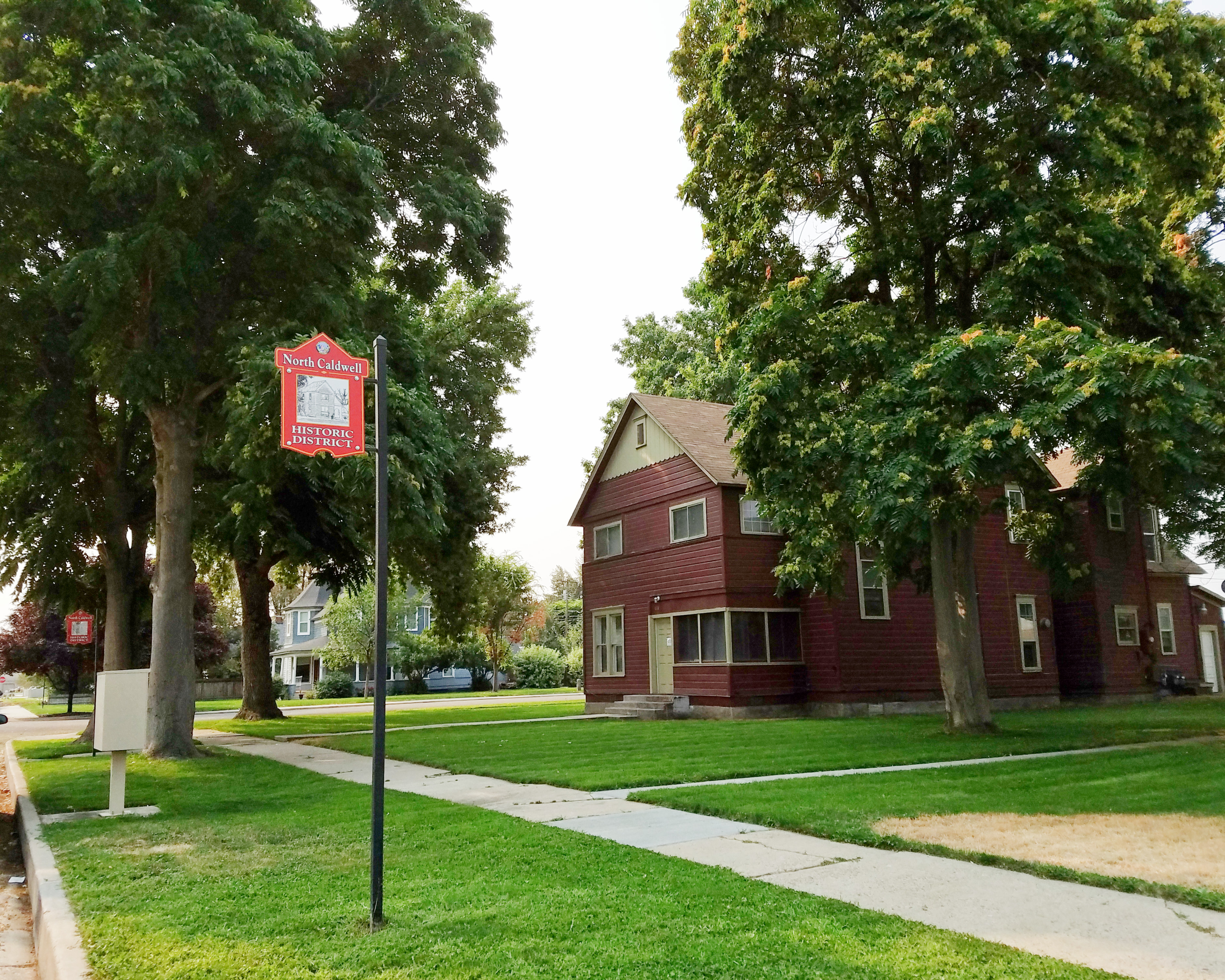
- At right is Blatchley House (1889), home of Henry and Carrie Gwinn Blatchley, early supporters of the College of Idaho. The Blatchleys later built a larger home, Blatchley Hall (1910), on what is now the campus of the College of Idaho. At left is the John P. Johnson House (1890).

- Location within Idaho Location within the United States
- Location: 9th Avenue, Albany and Belmont Streets, Caldwell, Idaho
- Coordinates: 43°40′01″N 116°41′03″W
- Area: 2.25 acres (0.91 ha)
- Built: 1880s, 1890s
- Architectural style: Queen Anne
- NRHP reference No.: 79000785
- Added to NRHP: September 5, 1979

The North Caldwell Historic District in Caldwell, Idaho, includes one church and five houses constructed in the Queen Anne style in the 1880s and 1890s. The historic district is between Albany and Belmont Streets on 9th Avenue with one house midblock on Belmont between 8th and 9th Avenues. The district was listed on the National Register of Historic Places in 1979, and it is part of a larger, 15-site walking tour also designated by the city of Caldwell as North Caldwell Historic District.

== History ==
The town of Caldwell was platted in 1882 by Robert Strahorn, railroad promoter and business associate of Alexander Caldwell, the town namesake. The North Caldwell Historic District is part of the original townsite. Strahorn's wife, Carrie Adell Strahorn, helped to establish the Presbyterian church in Caldwell in 1890 and the College of Idaho in 1891. Among the six properties in the district inventory are the church building (1890) and parsonage (1897). The inventory also contains the home of William Judson Boone (1890), original pastor of the church and first president of the College of Idaho.
