= Longfellow School (Boise, Idaho) =

- U.S. National Register of Historic Places
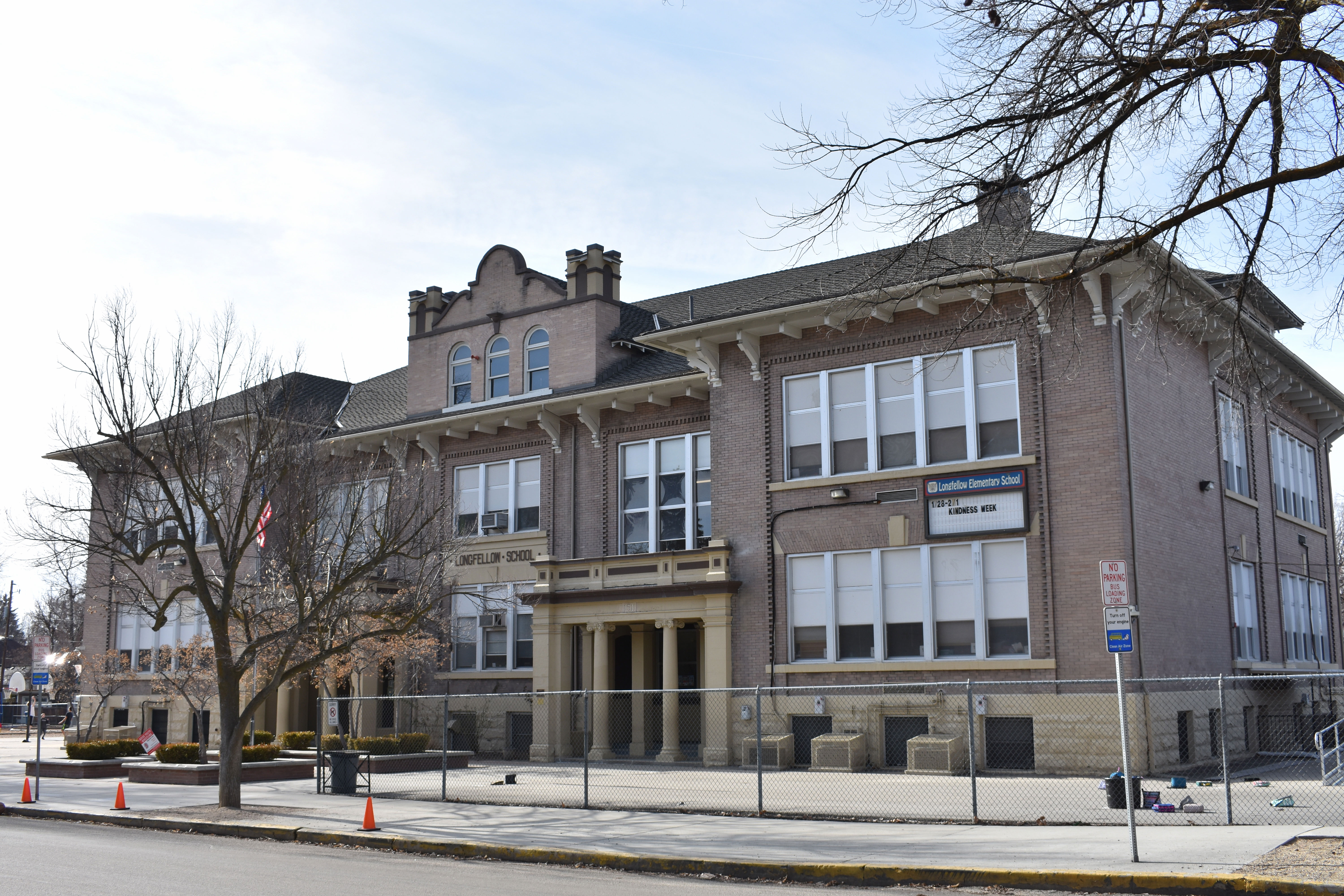
- Longfellow School in 2019

- Location within Idaho Location within the United States
- Location: 1511 N. 9th St., Boise, Idaho
- Coordinates: 43°37′44″N 116°11′53″W
- Area: 2.3 acres (0.93 ha)
- Built: 1906
- Architect: Wayland & Fennell
- MPS: Boise Public Schools TR
- NRHP reference No.: 82000219
- Added to NRHP: November 8, 1982

Longfellow School is a 2-story, brick and sandstone elementary school in Boise, Idaho, designed by Wayland & Fennell and completed in 1906. The Mission Revival building has been in operation as a school since opening, and it was added to the National Register of Historic Places in 1982.

The building design featured separate entrances for boys and girls, 12 classrooms, and a basement apartment for the janitor. Longfellow School was the seventh schoolhouse constructed within the limits of Boise's Independent School District.
