= Lowell School (Boise, Idaho) =

Historical building in Boise, Idaho

- U.S. National Register of Historic Places
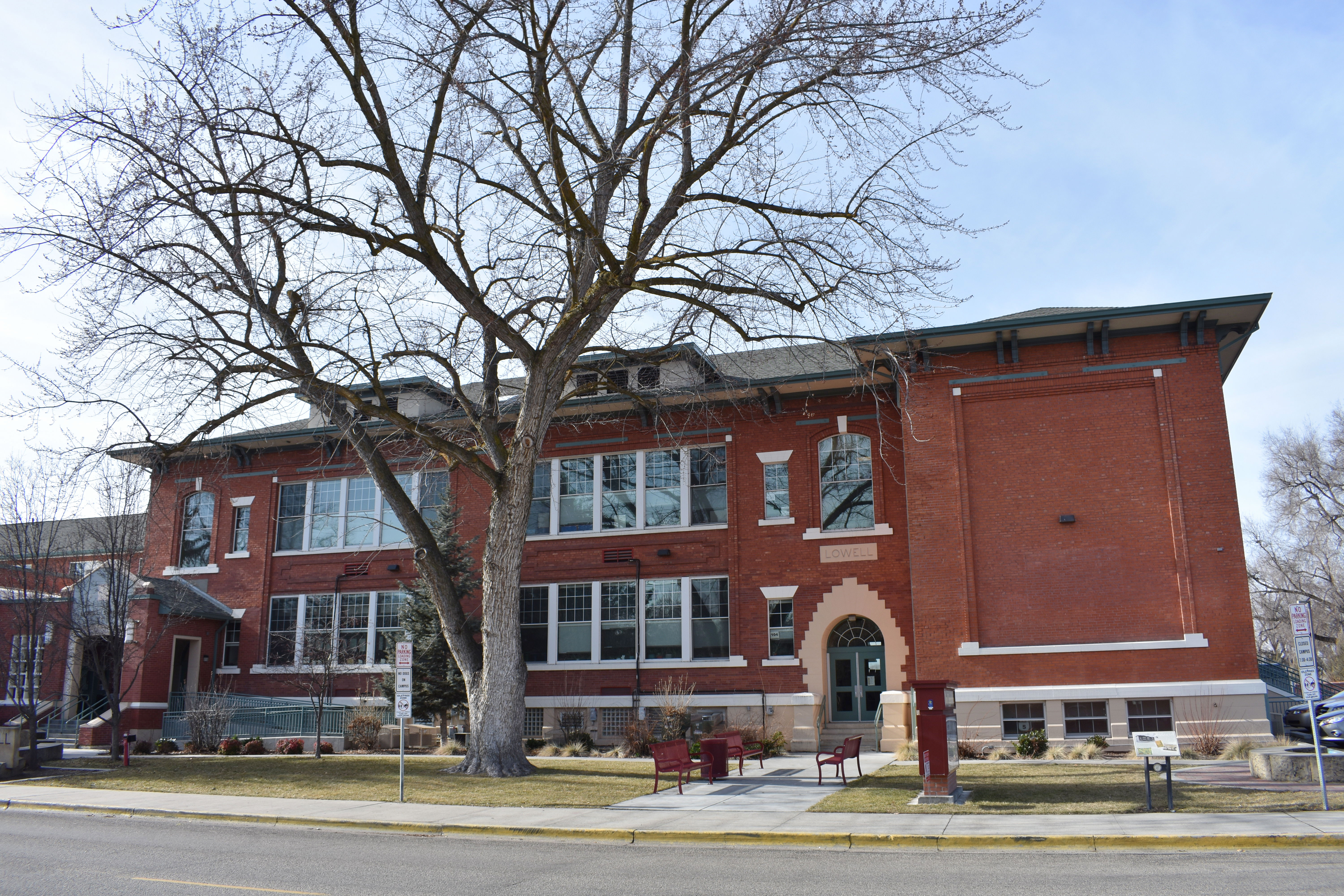
- Lowell School in 2019

- Location within Idaho Location within the United States
- Location: 1507 N. 22nd St., Boise, Idaho
- Coordinates: 43°38′02″N 116°13′23″W
- Area: 9.5 acres (3.8 ha)
- Built: 1913
- Architect: Heath & Twitchell
- MPS: Boise Public Schools TR
- NRHP reference No.: 82000220
- Added to NRHP: November 8, 1982

Lowell School in Boise, Idaho, is a 2 1/2-story, brick and stone elementary school constructed in 1913 and named for James Russell Lowell. The building was expanded in 1916, 1926, and 1948, and it was added to the National Register of Historic Places (NRHP) in 1982.

The NRHP nomination form credits Tacoma architects Heath & Twitchell with the design, but in 1913 The Idaho Statesman reported that plans and specifications had been prepared by students in the Drafting Department at Boise High School.
