= Idanha Hotel =

- U.S. National Register of Historic Places
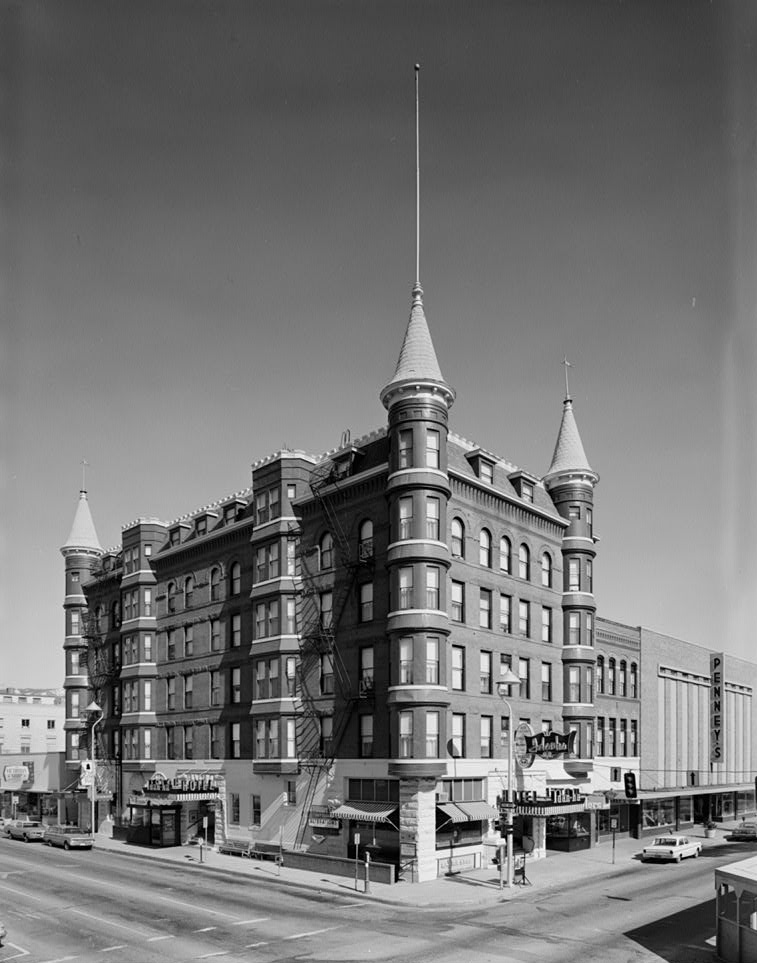

- Location within Idaho Location within the United States
- Location: 10th and Main Sts., Boise, Idaho
- Coordinates: 43°37′0″N 116°12′17″W
- Area: less than one acre
- Built: 1901
- Architect: W. S. Campbell
- Architectural style: French Chateau
- NRHP reference No.: 74000728
- Added to NRHP: July 9, 1974

The Idanha Hotel is a historic building in downtown Boise on the corner of 10th and Main Street, built in Boise, Idaho in 1901. The Idanha Building opened and functioned as a hotel until it was transformed into an apartment building in the 1970s. It was listed on the National Register of Historic Places in 1974.

The building is a six-story red brick French-Chateau structure with round turrets on its three prominent corners and a mansard roof. Built on a sandstone basement and foundation, it is one of the only few buildings left in downtown Boise with a sandstone foundation. The building is currently an apartment building with the Bombay Grill and Guru Donuts on its 1st floor and 10th Street Station Bar and Mullet Proof Hair Co. in its basement.

It was designed by architect W. S. Campbell. When built in 1901 at cost of $125,000, it was the most expensive building to date in Boise.

== Paranormal Activity ==
For decades, the Idanha Building has had many reports of paranormal activity from residents and staff, most of the activity being on the third and fourth floors. There have been events where staff of the Bombay Grill stated that pans, pots, and silverware have flown and fallen off shelves, some utensils flying at employees. Residents have reported their blankets being pulled off of them while sleeping and being pulled out of bed.
