= John E. Tourtellotte =

American architect

- Born: John Everett Tourtellotte; February 22, 1869; East Thompson, Connecticut
- Died: May 8, 1939 (aged 70); Portland, Oregon
- Occupation: Architect
- Spouse(s): Della Wallace Tourtellotte (1869–1946)
- Children: 2
- Practice: John E. Tourtellotte & Company; Tourtellotte & Hummel
- Buildings: Idaho State Capitol, U. of Idaho Administration Bldg.

John Everett Tourtellotte (February 22, 1869 – May 8, 1939) was a prominent western American architect, best known for his projects in Idaho. His work in Boise included the Idaho State Capitol, the Boise City National Bank, the Carnegie Library, and numerous other buildings for schools, universities, churches, and government institutions. From 1922 to 1930, he worked in Portland, Oregon.

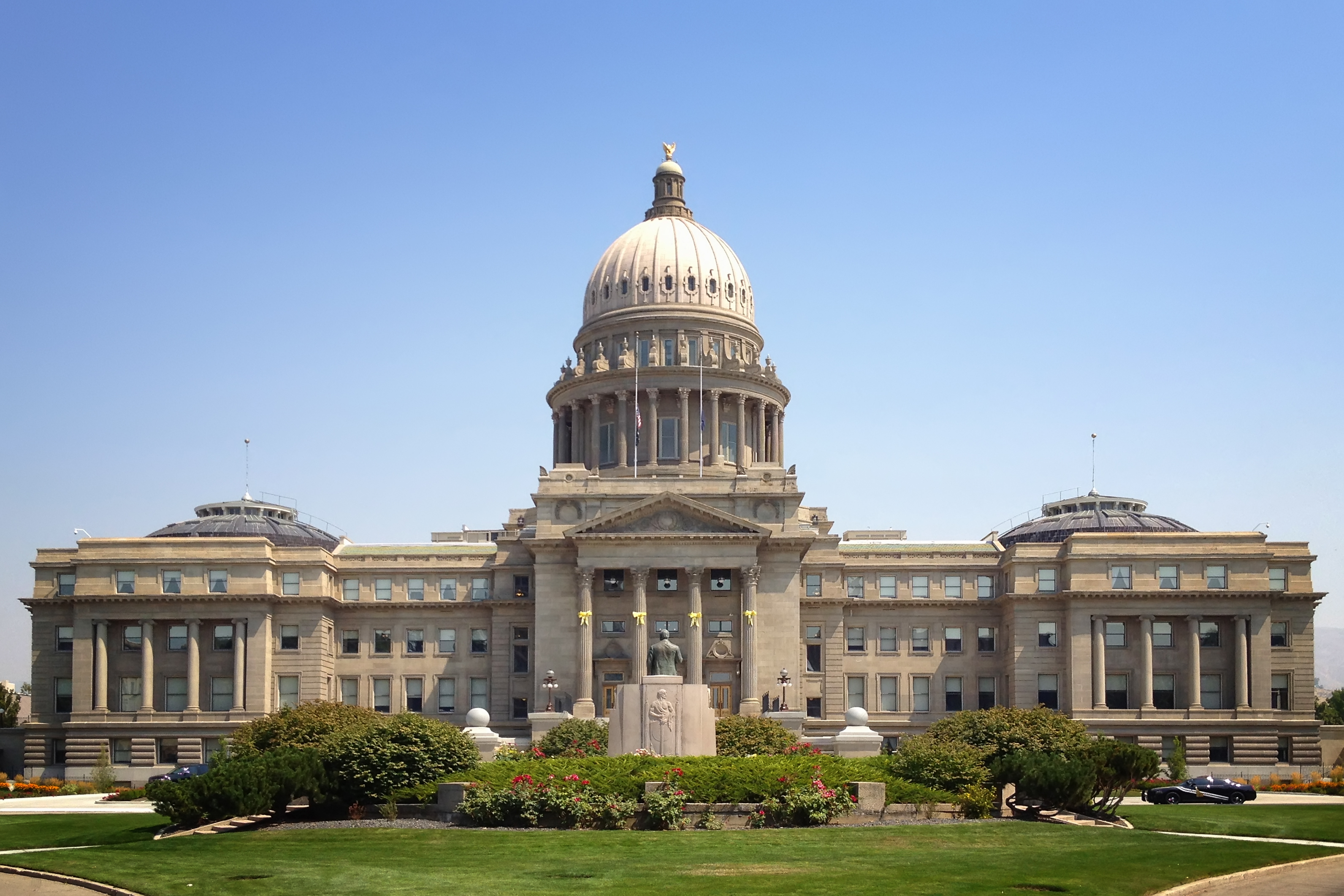
Idaho State Capitol, Boise

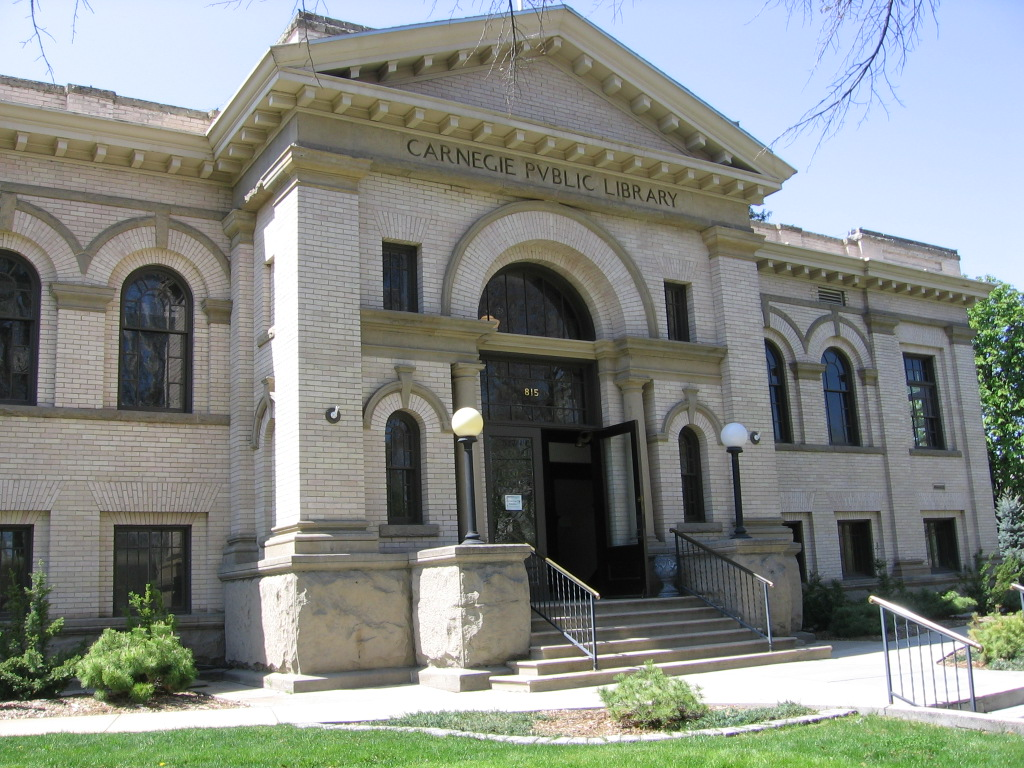
Carnegie Library, Boise (defunct)

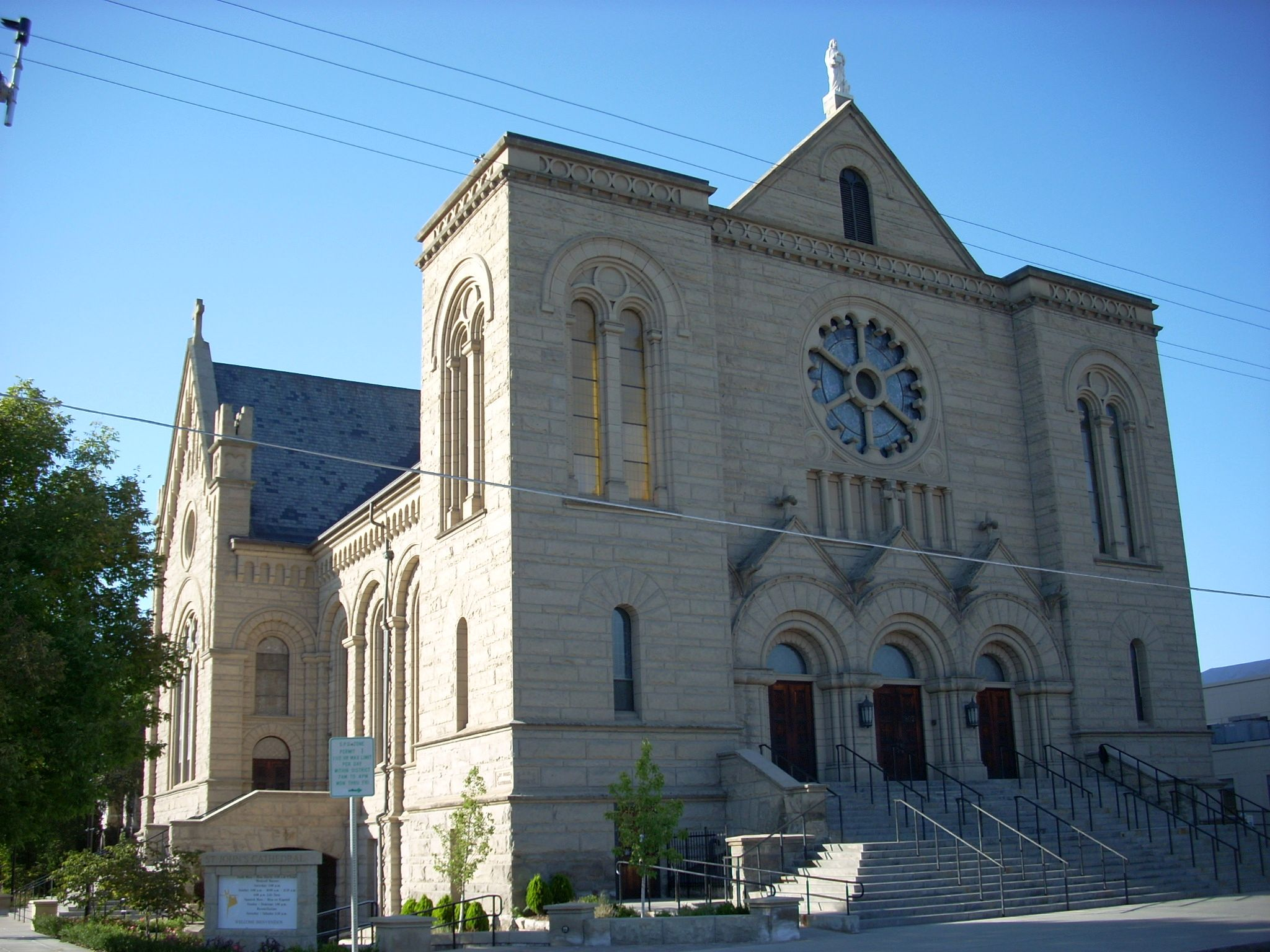
St. John's Cathedral, Boise

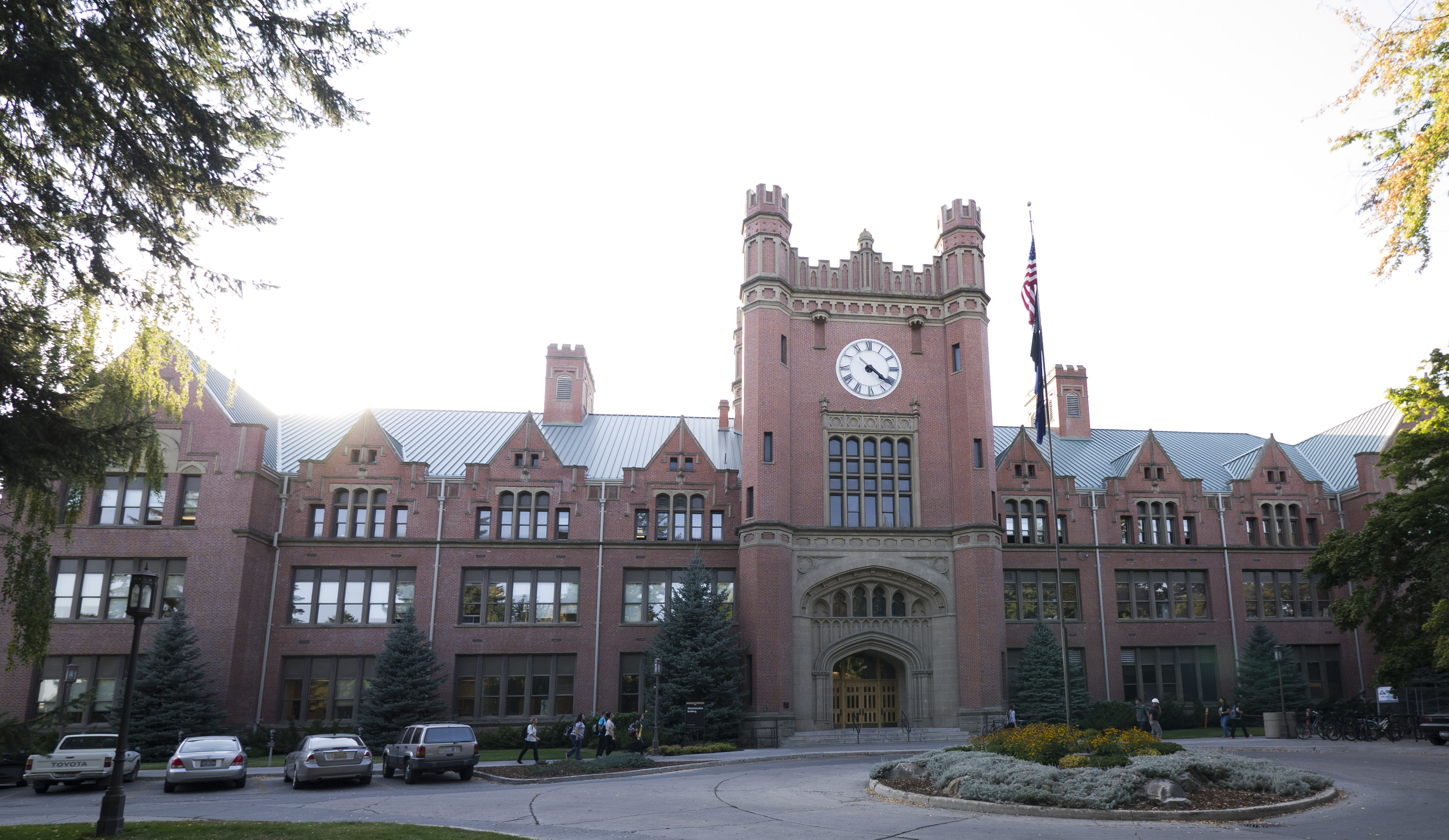
University of Idaho Administration Building, Moscow

He was associated with partnerships John E. Tourtellotte & Company and Tourtellotte & Hummel, based in Boise. Works by these firms were covered in a 1982 study and many of the buildings were immediately or later listed on the National Register of Historic Places.

== Early years ==
Tourtellotte was born in East Thompson, Connecticut, to a well-respected French Huguenot family. His father, Charles W. Tourtellotte, was a prosperous farmer and grist-mill owner. At age 17, he enrolled as an apprentice to the architectural firm of Cutting & Bishop, based in Webster, Massachusetts, where he studied architectural drawing for two years. During this time, he supervised roof construction for the Butler Insane Asylum in Providence, Rhode Island, and the Anne & Hope factory in Lonsdale, the largest factory in the United States.

Following his apprenticeship, Tourtellotte travelled westward, working on construction projects in Chicago, Kansas City, Albuquerque, and Pueblo, Colorado, before arriving in Boise in 1890, months after Idaho achieved statehood.

== Idaho and Oregon ==
His architectural and construction business thrived in Boise, and by 1894, Tourtellotte devoted his business entirely to architecture. In 1903, he formed a partnership with German immigrant Charles F. Hummel (1857–1939), a university-trained architect who had previously worked for Tourtellotte's architecture and construction business. "Charles Hummel, born in Germany in 1857, became the unspecified but probably indispensable second partner in the firm Tourtellotte & Company in 1900. He became a named partner in 1910, and was left fully responsible for the Boise operation when Tourtellotte went to Portland in 1913."

"After 1900 it becomes increasingly difficult to attribute designs specifically to Tourtellotte, given that most of his energies were devoted to promotion. Hummel was probably the chief designer of the greater share of the key works between 1900 and 1920."

"The community development hotels, a major accomplishment of Tourtellotte's little-documented Oregon years, were a direct reflection of [his persuasive business] skills. They were so valued that, when he and Charles Hummel severed most of the connections between their Portland and Boise offices in 1922. Tourtellotte retained ten percent of the gross receipts from the Idaho operation in return for "getting out quantities of plates, booklets, etc. for advertising purposes and also letters for direct solicitation of business. ... The two offices, though maintaining a common name, joint advertising, and a periodic association on particular projects, were hencefoth functionally separate."

Tourtellotte then partnered with one of Charles Hummel's sons, fellow architect Frank K. Hummel (1892–1961). The two shared a Portland office from 1922 until Tourtellotte's retirement in 1930, and Frank Hummel worked there until its closure around 1934, when he returned to Boise. *Tourtellotte continued to work as he designed a proposed Portland City Hall in 1933 with architect Truman E. Phillips as well as a completed project, Linn County Courthouse in Albany, OR, which was in the building stages at the time of his death, also with Mr. PHillips, according to "Architect and Engineer", Vols. 136–139, page 55.

After retiring, Tourtellotte continued to live in Portland, where he died on May 8, 1939. He and his wife Della (1869–1946) are buried in Idaho at Morris Hill Cemetery in Boise.

Tourtellotte was known for combining architectural motifs from disparate styles and eras, and the domed Idaho State Capitol is celebrated for its use of natural light. To celebrate the opening of the state capitol, Tourtellotte wrote an essay where he compared the architectural styles of various eras to the state of spiritual and moral development of civilization evident during those times, with the use of illumination and light signifying the increasing spiritual enlightenment of humanity. The state capitol underwent an extensive restoration which was completed in 2010.

Tourtellotte also designed the replacement Administration Building at the University of Idaho in Moscow. Construction of the Tudor Gothic-style structure began in 1907 and the main building was completed in 1909; its wings in 1912 and 1916. Based on the Hampton Court Palace in England, the UI Administration Building is a campus icon and was added to the National Register of Historic Places in 1978, at age 69.

Tourtellotte fraternal affiliations were with the Benevolent and Protective Order of Elks, the Freemasons, and the Kiwanis.

== Works ==
=== John E. Tourtellotte, 1894-1901 ===
- W. Scott Neal House, 215 E. Jefferson St., Boise, Idaho (1897, 1914)
- Walter E. Pierce House, 5801 Branstetter St., Garden City, Idaho (1897)
- J. M. Johnson House, 1002 W. Franklin St., Boise, Idaho (1898)
- Willis Mickle House, 1415 N. 8th St., Boise, Idaho (1898)
- Herbert Dunton House, 906 W. Hays St, Boise, Idaho (1899, 1913)
- Mrs. W. B. Kurtz House, 439 W. 3rd St., Weiser, Idaho (1899, 1902)
- Morris Sommer House, 548 W. 2nd St., Weiser, Idaho (1899)
- A. B. Anderson House, 547 W. 1st St., Weiser, Idaho (1900)
- James Funsten House (Remodeling), 2420 Old Penitentiary Rd., Boise, Idaho (1900)
- Herman Haas House, 253 W. Idaho St., Weiser, Idaho (1900)
- Charles Paynton House, 1213 N. 8th St., Boise, Idaho (1900)
- Nathan Smith House, 2315 S. Broadway Ave., Boise, Idaho (1900)
- Union Block, 720 W. Idaho St., Boise, Idaho (1900–01)
- Marion Allsup House, 1601 N. 10th St., Boise, Idaho (1901)

=== John E. Tourtellotte & Company, 1901-1910 ===
- H. E. McElroy House, 924 W. Fort St., Boise, Idaho (1901)
- Alva Fleharty House, 907 W. Hays St., Boise, Idaho (1902)
- Mackay Episcopal Church, Park Ave. & College St., Mackay, Idaho (1902)
- Walter Abbs House, 915 Fort St., Boise, Idaho (1903)
- Ada Odd Fellows Temple, 109-115 N. 9th St., Boise, Idaho (1903) - Demolished.
- Gymnasium and Armory, University of Idaho, Moscow, Idaho (1903)
- Bernard Haas House, 377 E. Main St., Weiser, Idaho (1903)
- Louis Kieldson Duplex, 413-415 Jefferson St., Boise, Idaho (1903)
- Axel Nixon House, 815 N. Hays St., Boise, Idaho (1903)
- Mary Elizabeth Sommercamp House, 411 W. 3rd St., Weiser, Idaho (1903)
- J. N. Wallace House, 1202 Franklin St, Boise, Idaho (1903–05)
- Albert Beck House, 1101 Fort St., Boise, Idaho (1904)
- Carnegie Public Library, 815 Washington St., Boise, Idaho (1904–05)
- James Davies House, 1107 W. Washington St., Boise, Idaho (1904)
- Harry K. Fritchman House, 1207 W. Hays St., Boise, Idaho (1904)
- John Haines House, 919 W. Hays St., Boise, Idaho (1904)
- T. J. Jones Apartments, 10th & Fort Sts., Boise, Idaho (1904)
- Pythian Castle, 30 E. Idaho St., Weiser, Idaho (1904)
- Ross Fork Episcopal Church, Mission Rd., Fort Hall, Idaho (1904)
- A. K. Steunenberg House, 409 N. Kimball Ave., Caldwell, Idaho (1904)
- Bishop's Residence, 804 N. 8th St., Boise, Idaho (1905–06)
- Henry N. Coffin House, 1403 W. Franklin St., Boise, Idaho (1905)
- Joseph Kinney Mausoleum, Morris Hill Cemetery, Boise, Idaho (1905)
- Dr. J. R. Numbers House, 240 W. Main St., Weiser, Idaho (1905)
- R. K. Davis House, 1016 Franklin St., Boise, Idaho (1906)
- Idaho State Capitol Building, 700 W. Jefferson St., Boise, Idaho (1906–12, 1920)
- Mitchell Hotel, 10th & Front Sts., Boise, Idaho (1906) - Demolished.
- Mrs. A. F. Rossi House, 1711 Boise Ave., Boise, Idaho (1906)
- Cathedral of St. John the Evangelist, 775 N. 8th St., Boise, Idaho (1906–21)
- H. A. Schmelzel House, 615 W. Hays St., Boise, ID (1906)
- Administration Building, University of Idaho, Moscow, Idaho (1907–09)
- Eaton Hall, Willamette University, Salem, Oregon (1907–08)
- Idaho Grocery Warehouses, 1209 Main St., Lewiston, Idaho (1907, 1911)
- Rosedale Odd Fellows Temple, 1755 Broadway, Boise, Idaho (1907)
- Trinity Episcopal Church, 7th & Idaho Sts., Gooding, Idaho (1907)
- Boise High School, Washington St., Boise, Idaho (1908, 1912, 1921)
- Fred Hottes House, 509 W. Hays St., Boise, Idaho (1908)
- N. Adolph Jacobsen Building, 40 N. Main St., Payette, Idaho (1908)
- Montandon Building, 722 W. Idaho Street, Boise, Idaho (1908)
- Mountain Home Baptist Church, 265 N. 4th St. E., Mountain Home, Idaho (1908)
- Albert Wolters Duplexes, 712-716 and 720-722 N. 8th St., Boise, Idaho (1908–09)
- Woodward Building, 23 8th St, Payette, Idaho (1908)
- F. T. Bliss House, E. 2nd & McKinley Sts., Emmett, Idaho (1909)
- Fred Brunzell House, 916 W. Franklin St., Boise, Idaho (1909)
- John Green Mausoleum, Morris Hill Cemetery, Boise, Idaho (1909)
- Lewiston City Hall, 207 3rd St., Lewiston, Idaho (1909)
- G. V. Nesbit House, 308 W. Liberty St., Weiser, Idaho (1909)
- W. A. Simpson House, 1004 N. 10 St., Boise, Idaho (1909)
- B. S. Varian House, 241 Main St., Weiser, Idaho (1909)
- C. H. Waymire Building, 1521 N. 13th St., Boise, Idaho (1909)
- Idaho Building, 280 N. 8th St., Boise, Idaho (1910) - With Henry J. Schlacks.
- Archie Larsen House, Larsen Rd, Weiser, Idaho (1910) - Demolished.
- Lewiston Vineyards Gates, 18th Ave. & 10th St., Lewiston, Idaho (1910)

=== Tourtellotte & Hummel, 1910-1930 ===
- Pilot Butte Inn, 1121 Wall Street, Bend, Oregon (1916)

=== John E. Tourtellotte, 1930-1937 ===
- Portland City Hall, Portland, Oregon (1933) - Not built.

=== Tourtellotte & Phillips (1937-1939) ===
- Gresham High School (Remodeling), N. Main Ave., Gresham, Oregon (1939–40)
- Linn County Courthouse, 300 SW 1st Ave., Albany, Oregon (1939–40)
