= H. A. Schmelzel House =

Historic house in Idaho, United States

- U.S. National Register of Historic Places
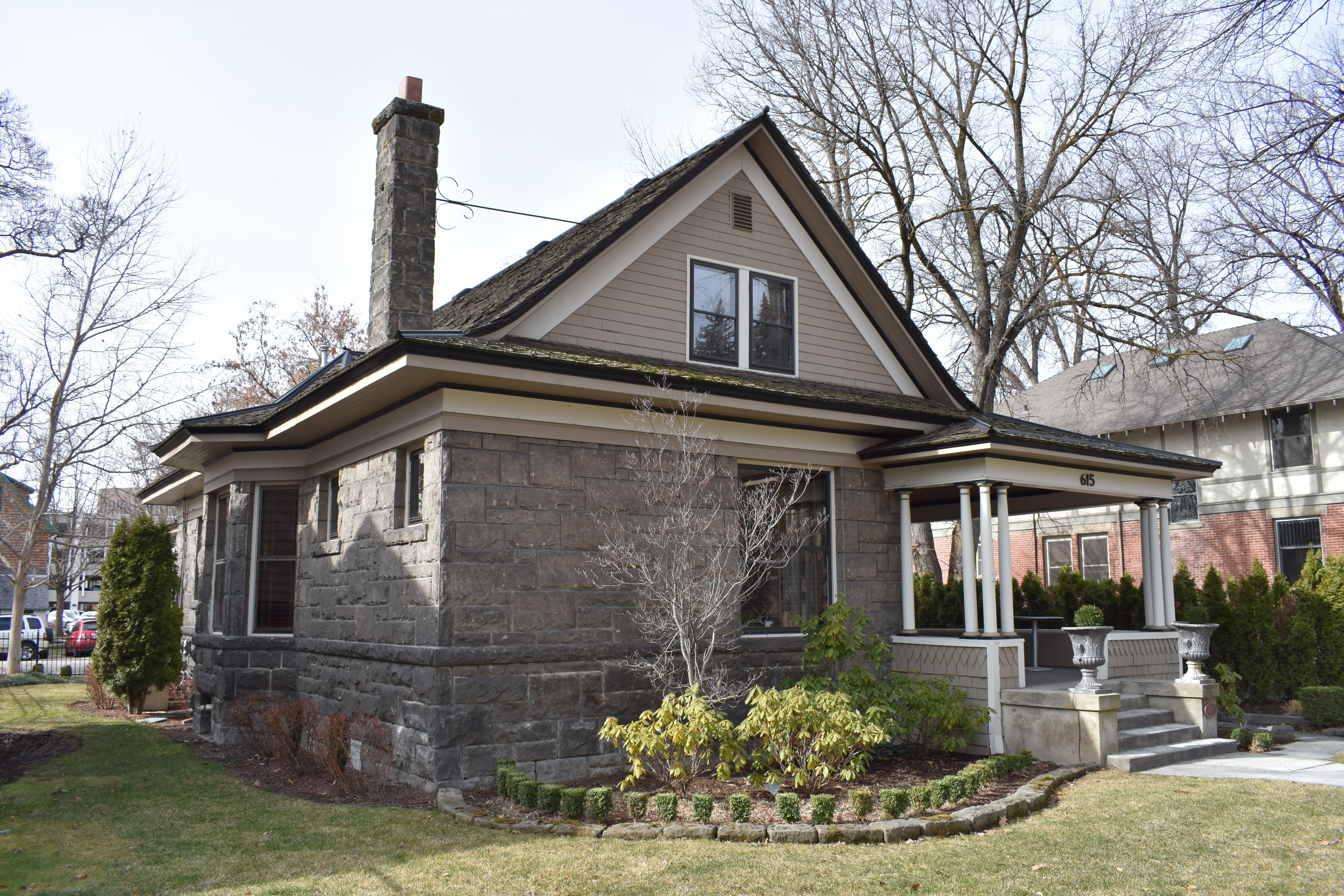
- The H.A. Schmelzel House in 2019

- Location within Idaho Location within the United States
- Location: 615 W. Hays St., Boise, Idaho
- Coordinates: 43°37′12″N 116°11′45″W
- Area: less than one acre
- Built: 1906
- Architect: Tourtellotte, John E. & Company
- Architectural style: Bungalow; Colonial Revival
- MPS: Tourtellotte and Hummel Architecture TR
- NRHP reference No.: 82000239
- Added to NRHP: November 17, 1982

The H.A. Schmelzel House in Boise, Idaho, United States, is a 1 1/2-story bungalow designed by Tourtellotte & Co. and constructed in 1906. It features Colonial Revival details, including flared eaves and an offset porch. First floor walls are veneered with random course sandstone, and front and side gables are covered with square shingles. Square shingles also cover the outer porch walls. The house is considered the first example of a bungalow in the architectural thematic group of John E. Tourtellotte. It was added to the National Register of Historic Places in 1982.

== Henry and Elizabeth Schmelzel ==
Henry A. Schmelzel was an electrician employed by the Capital Electric Light Company from 1888 until 1908, and his last years with the company were spent as superintendent of the power plant at Horseshoe Bend. While the Schmelzels continued to live outside of Boise, Elizabeth (McGee) Schmelzel purchased property for the H.A. Schmelzel House from William Myers in 1904, and she ordered design plans from Tourtellotte & Co. in 1906. Although the H.A. Schmelzel House was constructed for the Schmelzels, it was rented to Mr. and Mrs. William Puckett until the Schmelzels moved from Horseshoe Bend in 1908.

After retiring from Capital Electric Light, Henry Schmelzel became Boise's first building inspector in 1908. While inspecting the Dime Theatre, Schmelzel became interested in movie theaters, and he opened the Boise Theatre in December, 1908, with partner C.C. Pyle.

In 1921 the Schmelzels became caretakers of Boise Tourist Park, constructed in 1918.

== See also ==
- Mrs. A. F. Rossi House
- Brunzell House
- Fort Street Historic District
- National Register of Historic Places listings in Ada County, Idaho
