= Rosedale Odd Fellows Temple =

Historic NRHP building in Boise, Idaho

- U.S. National Register of Historic Places
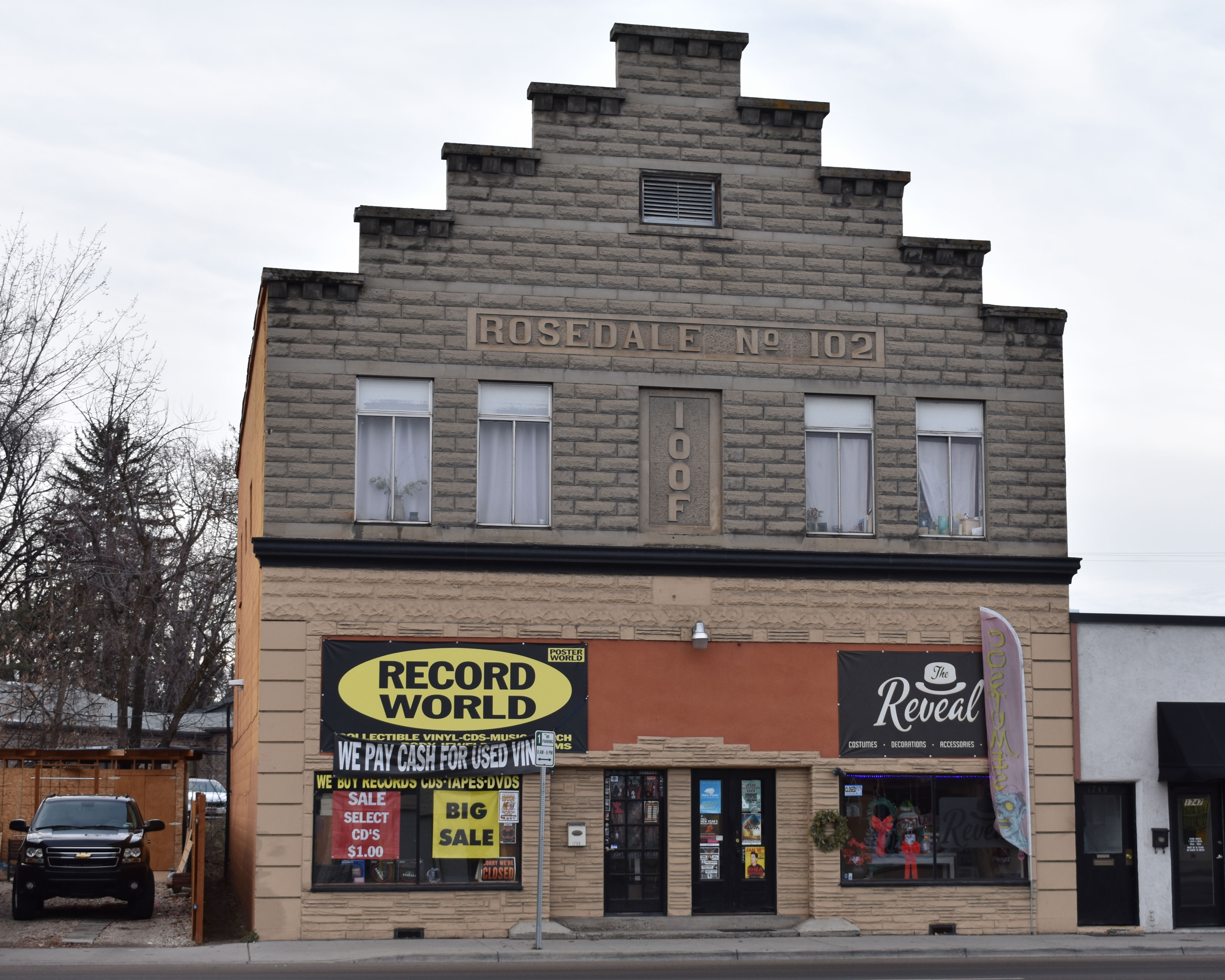
- Rosedale Odd Fellows Temple in 2019

- Location within Idaho Location within the United States
- Location: 1755 Broadway, Boise, Idaho
- Coordinates: 43°35′30″N 116°11′35″W
- Area: less than one acre
- Built: 1907
- Architect: Tourtellotte, John E. & Company
- MPS: Tourtellotte and Hummel Architecture TR
- NRHP reference No.: 82000237
- Added to NRHP: November 17, 1982

The Rosedale Odd Fellows Temple in Boise, Idaho, is a 2-story building with a prominent stepped gable. An early example in Boise of cast concrete block construction, the building was designed by Tourtellotte & Co., and it was completed in 1907.

The Rosedale Odd Fellows Temple was added to the National Register of Historic Places in 1982.

The International Order of Odd Fellows was an active fraternal organization in Idaho at the beginning of the 20th century. Boise already included lodge No. 3, organized in 1868, lodge No. 77, organized in 1900, and lodge No. 97, organized in 1902. The Rosedale lodge, No. 102, was organized in 1904 in South Boise, and it was described by the Idaho Statesman as "one of the best equipped fraternal buildings in Idaho."

== See also ==
- Ada Odd Fellows Temple
- Chinese Odd Fellows Building
- List of Odd Fellows buildings
- National Register of Historic Places listings in Ada County, Idaho
