= Steunenberg =

Steunenberg is a Dutch surname. Notable people with the surname include:

- Berdien Stenberg (born 1957), Berdien Steunenberg, Dutch flautist
- Frank Steunenberg (1861–1905), governor of Idaho

== See also ==
- A. K. Steunenberg House
