= Ross Fork Episcopal Church =

Historic church in Idaho, United States

- U.S. National Register of Historic Places
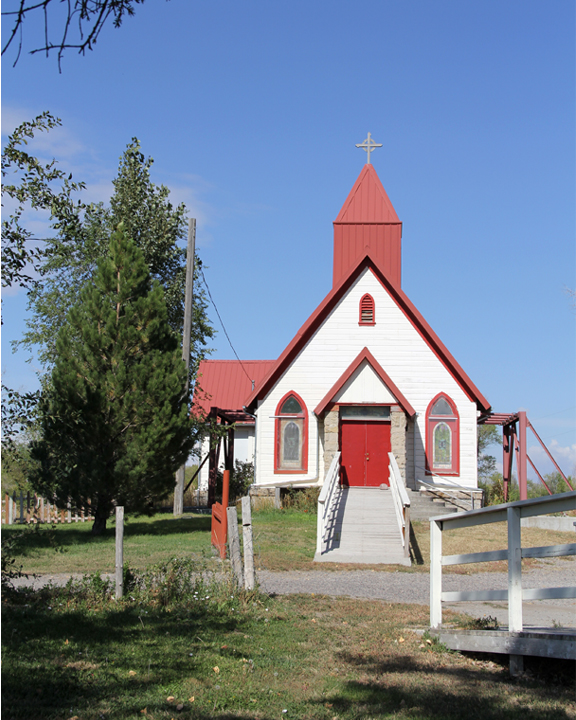

- Location within Idaho Location within the United States
- Location: Mission Rd., Fort Hall, Idaho
- Coordinates: 43°11′23″N 112°20′38″W
- Area: 1.3 acres (0.53 ha)
- Built: 1904
- Architect: J. E. Tourtellotte & Company, Wayland & Fennell
- Architectural style: Gothic Revival
- MPS: Tourtellotte and Hummel Architecture TR
- NRHP reference No.: 83000277
- Added to NRHP: January 3, 1983

Ross Fork Episcopal Church (also known as Good Shepherd Mission) is a historic church on Mission Road in Fort Hall, Idaho, in the Fort Hall Reservation. It was added to the National Register of Historic Places in 1983.

The church was built in 1904 as the Good Shepherd Mission, and was intended to educate the native population. Designed by Boise architects J. E. Tourtellotte & Company, it is a simple Gothic Revival structure. The building remains more or less as built, with the exception of the steeple, which has been replaced.

A school, next to the church, was also built. It eventually burned down, and was replaced in 1918 by a simple, Colonial Revival building by Wayland & Fennell. Though associated with the church, the school is not included in the nomination, which concerns itself solely with Tourtellotte architecture throughout Idaho.

The complex is presently occupied by the Ross Fork Episcopal Church.
