= Pilot Butte Inn =

Historic hotel in Oregon, United States

Coordinates: 44.06099°N 121.31247°W

- Formerly listed on the U.S. National Register of Historic Places
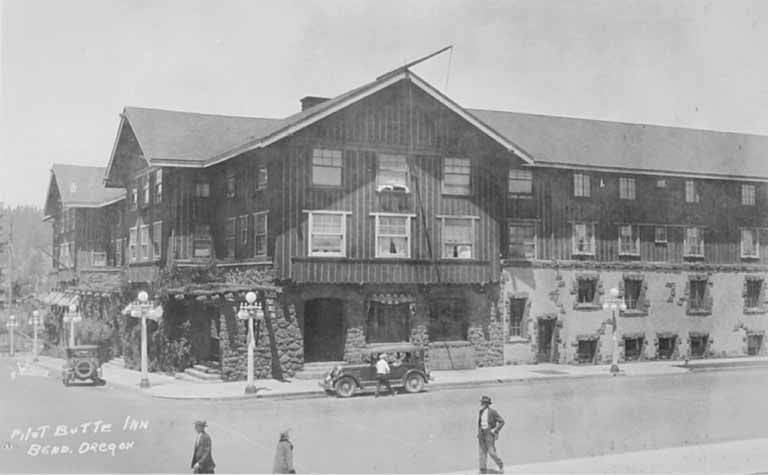
- The Pilot Butte Inn (taken circa 1928)

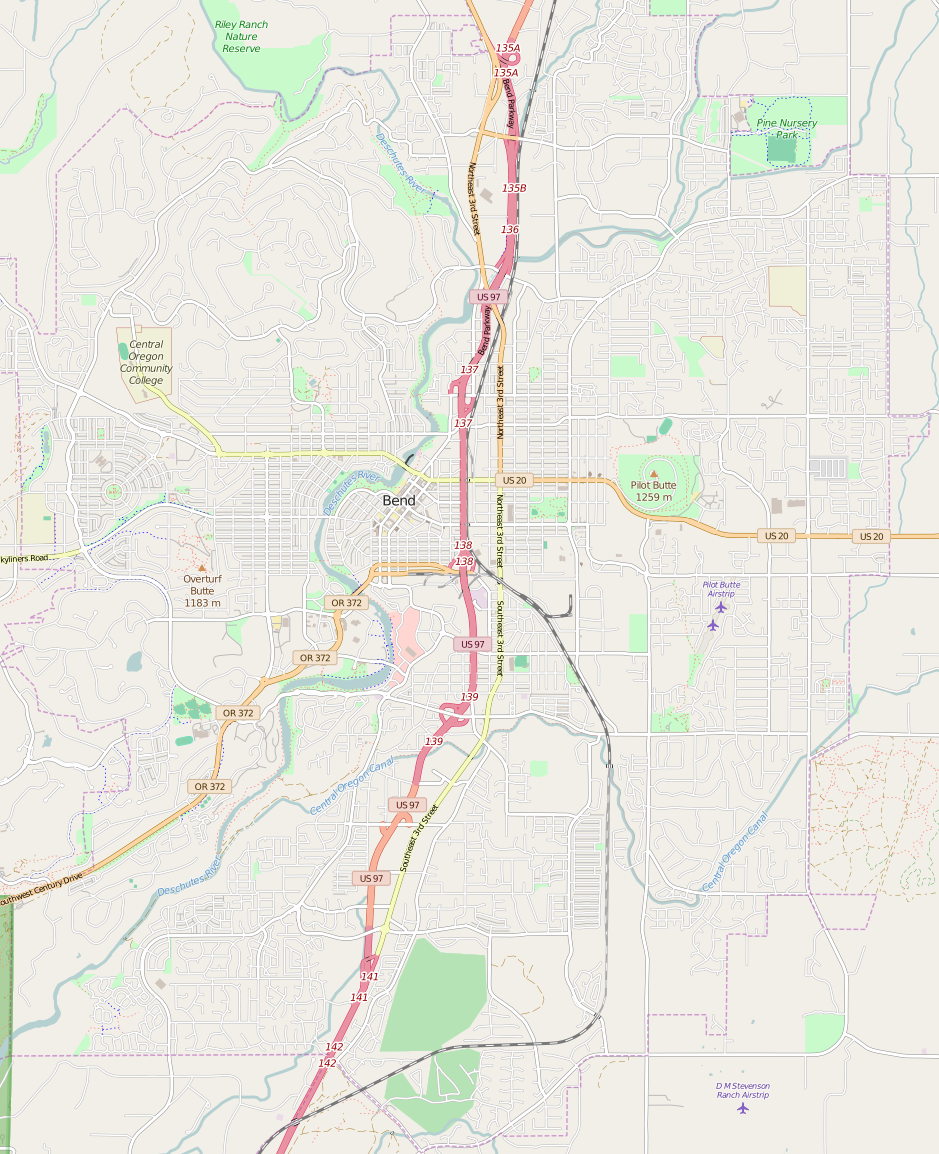
- Location within Bend OR Location within Oregon
- Location: 1121 Wall Street; Bend, Oregon
- Area: 1.6 acres (0.65 ha)
- Built: 1917
- Architect: John E. Tourtellotte
- Demolished: 1973
- NRHP reference No.: 72001567

Significant dates
- Added to NRHP: June 24, 1972
- Removed from NRHP: 1973

The Pilot Butte Inn was a hotel building in Bend, Oregon, in the United States. Designed by American architect John E. Tourtellotte, the inn was built in 1917 and exhibited American Craftsman style architecture.

== Description ==
The hotel building, described as a "rustic sportsman’s lodge", was designed by architect John E. Tourtellotte. It exhibited American Craftsman style architecture and made use of local materials like pine and river rock.

== History ==
The Pilot Butte Inn was built in 1917 on the banks of the Deschutes River in Bend, Oregon. In 1972, the inn became the first site in Deschutes County to be listed on the National Register of Historic Places. However, the building was demolished in June 1973.

== See also ==
- National Register of Historic Places listings in Deschutes County, Oregon
