= Union Block and Montandon Buildings =

U.S. historic building

- U.S. National Register of Historic Places
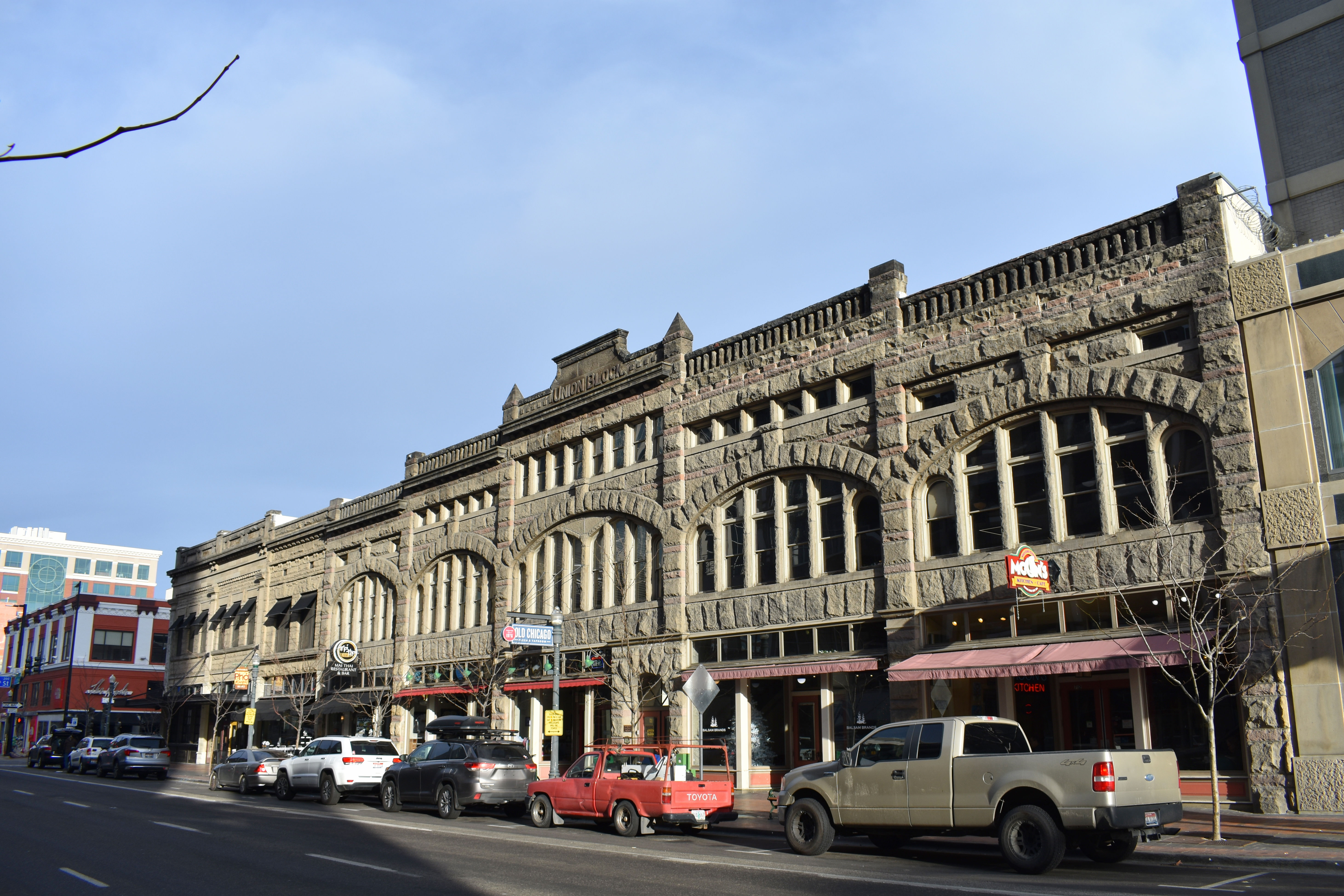
- Union Block (right) and Montandon Buildings (left) in 2019

- Location within Idaho Location within the United States
- Location: 8th and Idaho Sts., Boise, Idaho
- Coordinates: 43°36′59″N 116°12′04″W
- Area: less than one acre
- Built: 1908
- Architect: Tourtellotte & Co.; Smith, J.W.
- Architectural style: Renaissance, Romanesque
- NRHP reference No.: 79000767
- Added to NRHP: March 7, 1979

The Union Block and Montandon Buildings in Boise, Idaho, are 2-story commercial buildings with rustic sandstone facades. The Romanesque Revival Union Block was designed by John E. Tourtellotte and constructed in 1901, and the Renaissance Revival Montandon Building was designed by J.W. Smith and constructed in 1908. Also known as the Fidelity-Union Block, the buildings were added to the National Register of Historic Places (NRHP) in 1979.

== Union Block ==
The Union Block a 2-story, brick and sandstone commercial building with 126-ft frontage on Idaho St and 120-ft depth between Idaho and Bannock Sts, constructed by contractors Walker & Jensen in 1901. The building includes space for five storefronts, and the second floor was designed for 21 offices and for a 55-ft by 120-ft meeting room and music hall.

Original commercial tenants of the building included the O.K. Grocery Co., Beal Furniture, Regan Mercantile Co., and Idaho Hardware & Plumbing Company which expanded into the Union Block from their adjoining building. The music hall was leased by Professor Christensen's Dance Academy.

== Montandon Building ==
The Montandon Building is a 2-story, brick and sandstone commercial building designed by J.W. Smith and completed in 1908. August F. Montandon had owned the northeast corner lot at N 8th St and W Idaho St since 1899, and Montandon buildings were demolished to build the new Montandon Building, constructed to house the Anderson-Blomquist Department Store, later known as George A. Anderson & Co. The Montandon Building is a combination of two commercial buildings, the corner building constructed in 1908 and an earlier 2-story building on Idaho St that was the location of Idaho Hardware & Plumbing Co. A second floor was added to the hardware building in 1901 in order that the facade more closely conform to that of the Union Block. The NRHP nomination form indicates that the second floor was added in 1908.

During construction of the Union Block, Montandon's planning for the Eighth and Idaho corner included either a 3-story or a 4-story building that conformed in style to the 2-story Union Block design. In August, 1901, Montandon had settled on a 3-story building, and he contracted for delivery of 500,000 bricks. Montandon's plans changed again before 1902, and he finally constructed 1-story, wood-frame buildings with a sandstone facade at the Eighth and Idaho corner, adjacent to Idaho Hardware & Plumbing Co. Montandon's wood-frame buildings were demolished in 1908 prior to excavating the corner for the Montandon Building.

The Telephone Building on Main St in Boise was briefly known as the Montandon Building in 1900. Montandon had purchased property adjacent to the Rocky Mountain Bell Telephone Building, built in 1899, and in 1900 he constructed an adjoining building and combined both buildings behind a common facade of finished sandstone.
