= John Green Mausoleum =

- Green, John, Mausoleum
- U.S. National Register of Historic Places
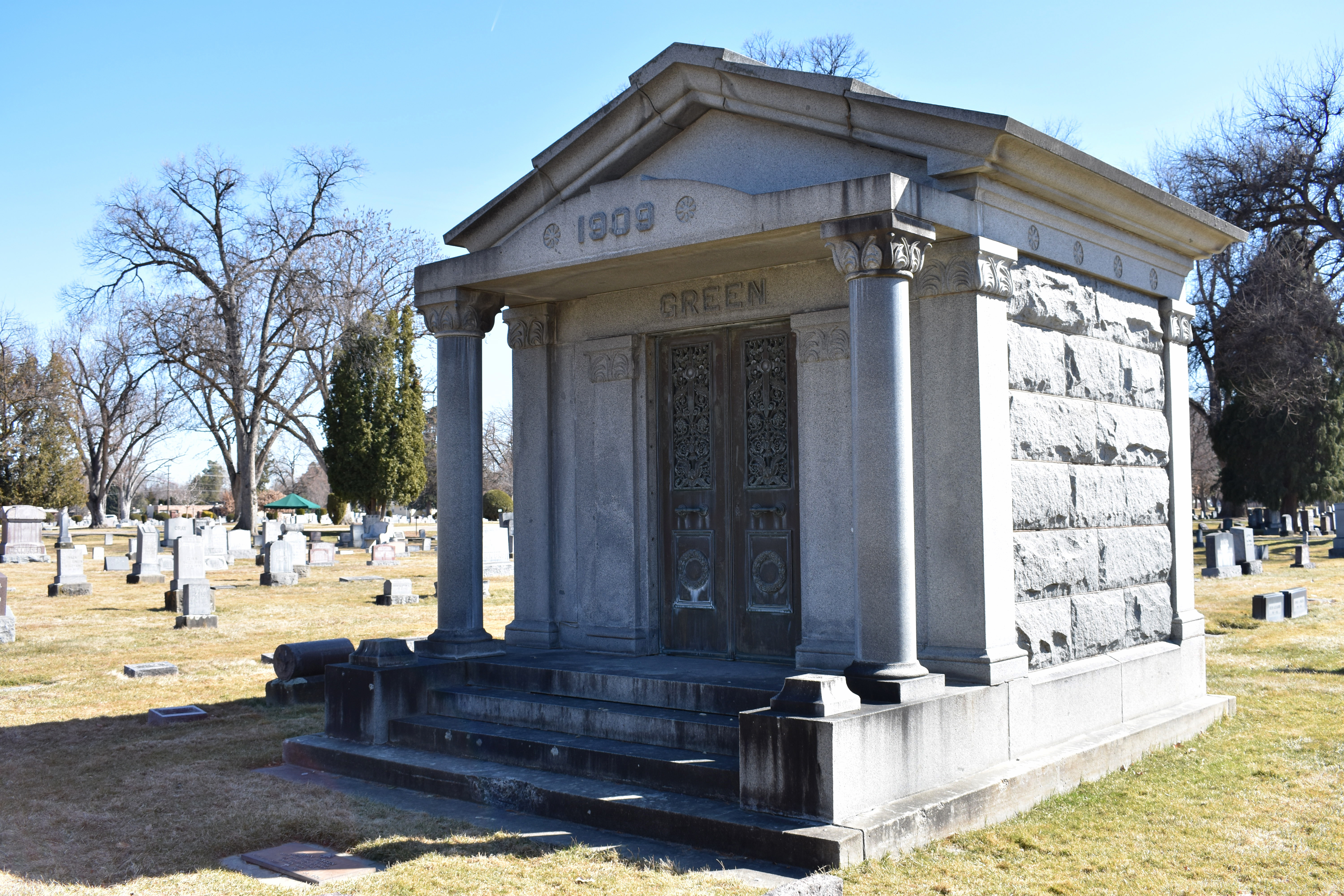
- The John Green Mausoleum in 2019

- Location within Idaho Location within the United States
- Location: Morris Hill Cemetery, Boise, Idaho
- Coordinates: 43°36′37″N 116°13′52″W
- Area: less than one acre
- Built: 1909
- Architect: Tourtellotte, John E. Company
- Architectural style: Eclectic, Romanesque
- MPS: Tourtellotte and Hummel Architecture TR
- NRHP reference No.: 82000205
- Added to NRHP: November 17, 1982

The John Green Mausoleum at Morris Hill Cemetery in Boise, Idaho, is an eclectic entombment designed by Tourtellotte & Co. and constructed in 1909. The mausoleum is made of stone and shows a Romanesque influence with geometric forms. Bronze doors opposite a single window are the only fenestrations, and corner pilasters frame the structure. A parapet stairway extends beyond an outset gable above the entrance. The mausoleum was added to the National Register of Historic Places in 1982.

== John Green ==
German immigrant John Green (November 20, 1825 – November 22, 1908) was a career soldier in the United States Army, enlisting as a private and retiring as a lieutenant colonel. After his retirement in 1889, Green was promoted to the rank of brevet general in recognition of his 43 years of distinguished service. Green fought in the Mexican–American War, the American Civil War, and in many battles during the westward expansion of the United States. He received the Medal of Honor for bravery in the First Battle of the Stronghold in 1873.

Green first assumed command of Fort Boise in 1877. In 1879 he was given command of Fort Walla Walla. During the 1880s Green shuttled between Boise and Walla Walla, alternating his command between the two forts. Green retired in 1889 and settled in Boise, although during his last ten years he resided in Germany and returned to Boise for extended visits. He died in Boise in 1908.

After John Green's death, his widow contracted with Tourtellotte & Co. to construct a mausoleum similar to that of Joseph Kinney. Green's remains were placed in the Joseph Kinney Mausoleum during construction, and in 1910 the remains of John Green were transferred to the John Green Mausoleum. The mausoleum, large enough for four bodies, featured granite from Baker City, and it was lined with marble.

== See also ==
- Joseph Kinney Mausoleum
- Morris Hill Cemetery Mausoleum
- National Register of Historic Places listings in Ada County, Idaho
