= R. K. Davis House =

- U.S. National Register of Historic Places
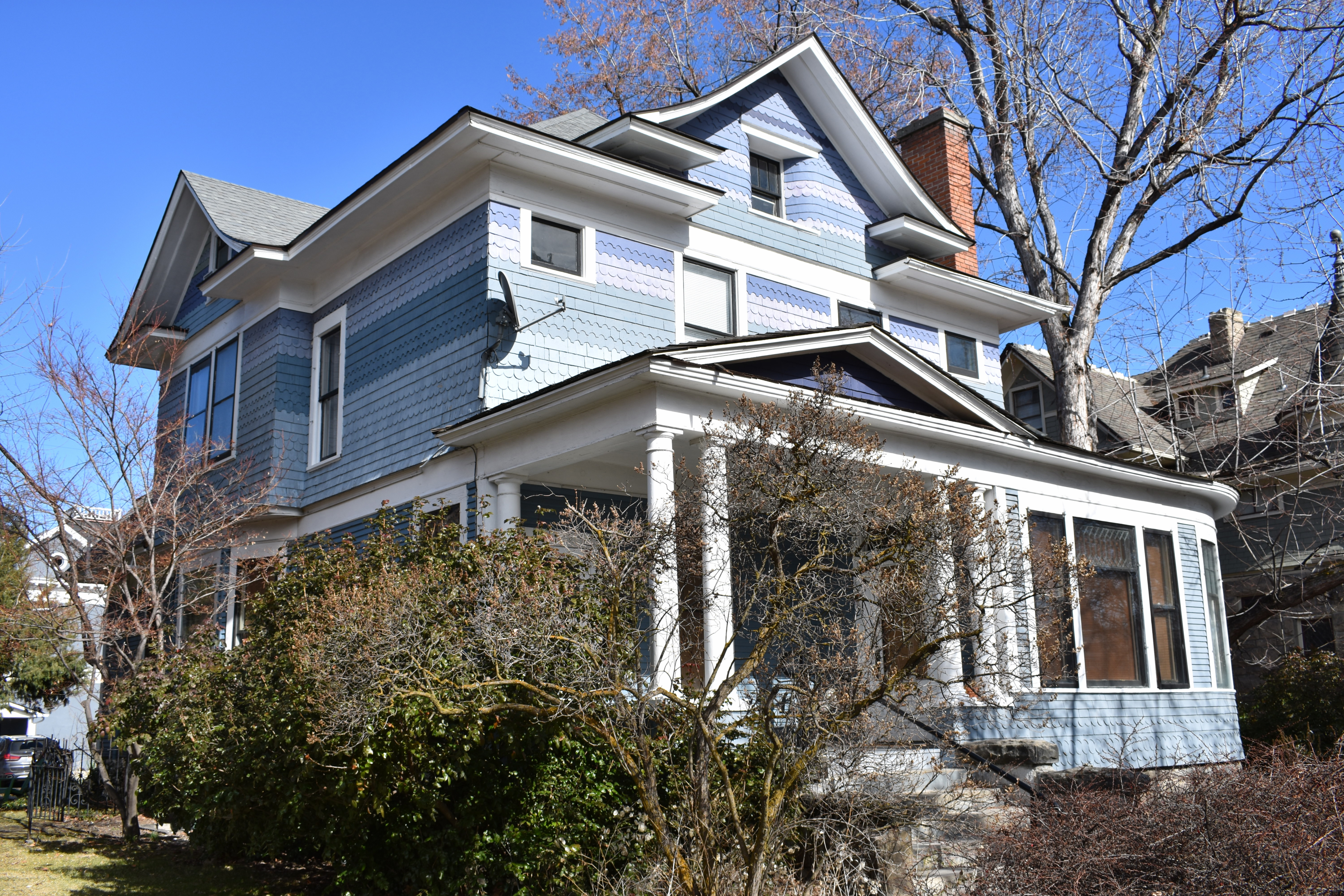
- The R.K. Davis House in 2019

- Location within Idaho Location within the United States
- Location: 1016 Franklin St., Boise, Idaho
- Coordinates: 43°37′19″N 116°12′03″W
- Area: less than one acre
- Built: 1906
- Architect: Tourtellotte, John E. & Company
- Architectural style: Colonial Revival, Classical Revival, Queen Anne
- MPS: Tourtellotte and Hummel Architecture TR
- NRHP reference No.: 82000193
- Added to NRHP: November 17, 1982

The R.K. Davis House in Boise, Idaho, is a 2-story Queen Anne style house designed by Tourtellotte & Co. and constructed in 1906. The house features Classical Revival elements, including a pedimented portico with Tuscan columns. Architectural drawings for the house indicated a Bungalow design, but the plan changed during construction to a more formal design that incorporates Queen Anne, Classical Revival, and Colonial Revival details, possibly to blend the house with older homes on the street. The house was listed on the National Register of Historic Places in 1982.

Robert K. and Christine (Orchard) Davis occupied the house from its construction until some time prior to the death of Robert Davis in 1958. Davis and his brother, Samuel T. Davis, were pioneers in Idaho, having moved as children from Oregon to Idaho City with their father, Ben T. Davis, in 1864. Ben Davis was a nephew of Confederate president Jefferson Davis. The Davis brothers moved to Boise in 1901 and purchased an interest in the Idaho Hardware Co., later the Davis Supply Co.
