= Morris Sommer House =

- U.S. National Register of Historic Places
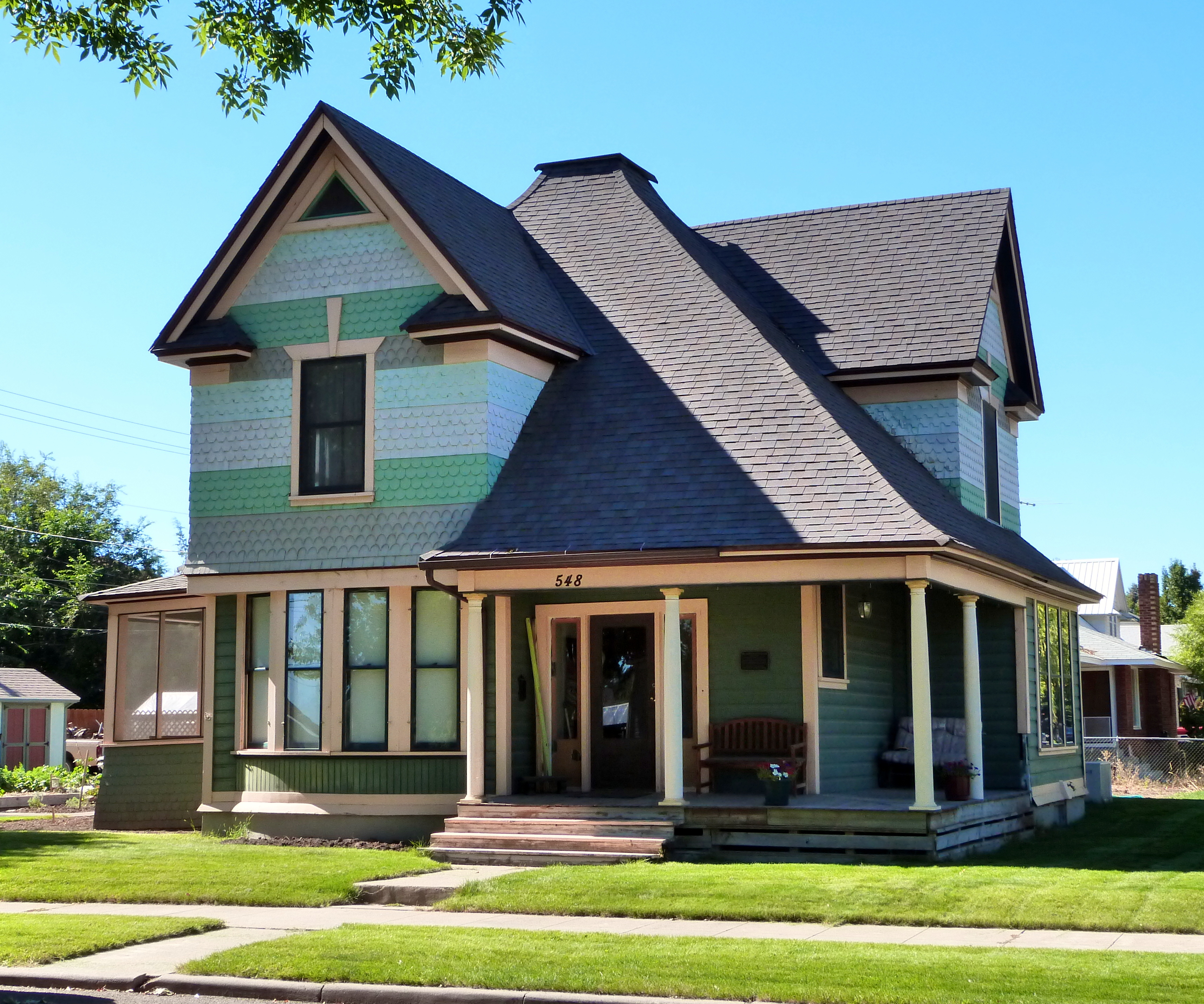

- Location within Idaho
- Location: 548 W. 2nd St., Weiser, Idaho
- Coordinates: 44°14′52″N 116°58′21″W
- Area: less than one acre
- Built: 1899
- Architect: John E. Tourtellotte & Company
- Architectural style: Queen Anne
- MPS: Tourtellotte and Hummel Architecture TR
- NRHP reference No.: 82000380
- Added to NRHP: November 17, 1982

The Morris Sommer House, at 548 W. 2nd St. in Weiser, Idaho, was built in 1899. It was listed on the National Register of Historic Places in 1982.

It is an L-shaped house which was designed by architect of the John E. Tourtellotte in a version of Queen Anne style. Aspects of the design consistent with Queen Anne style are the irregularity of its massing and roofline, use of a wraparound porch, and decorative elements in its surfaces and moldings. It is unusual for its "long flared roof flowing down". The "unusually flowing roof", coming from a high truncated hipped roof down and out over a porch, appears in later examples of the John E. Tourtellotte & Company's works. Other examples are the Wills House in Boise, and the Wyman House (1908) on Harrison Boulevard also in Boise. (Note: The city of the second one is derived from fact (apparent from Google maps) that there is a Harrison Boulevard in Boise but not one in Weiser.)
