= T. J. Jones Apartments =

U.S. historic building

- Jones, T. J., Apartments
- U.S. National Register of Historic Places
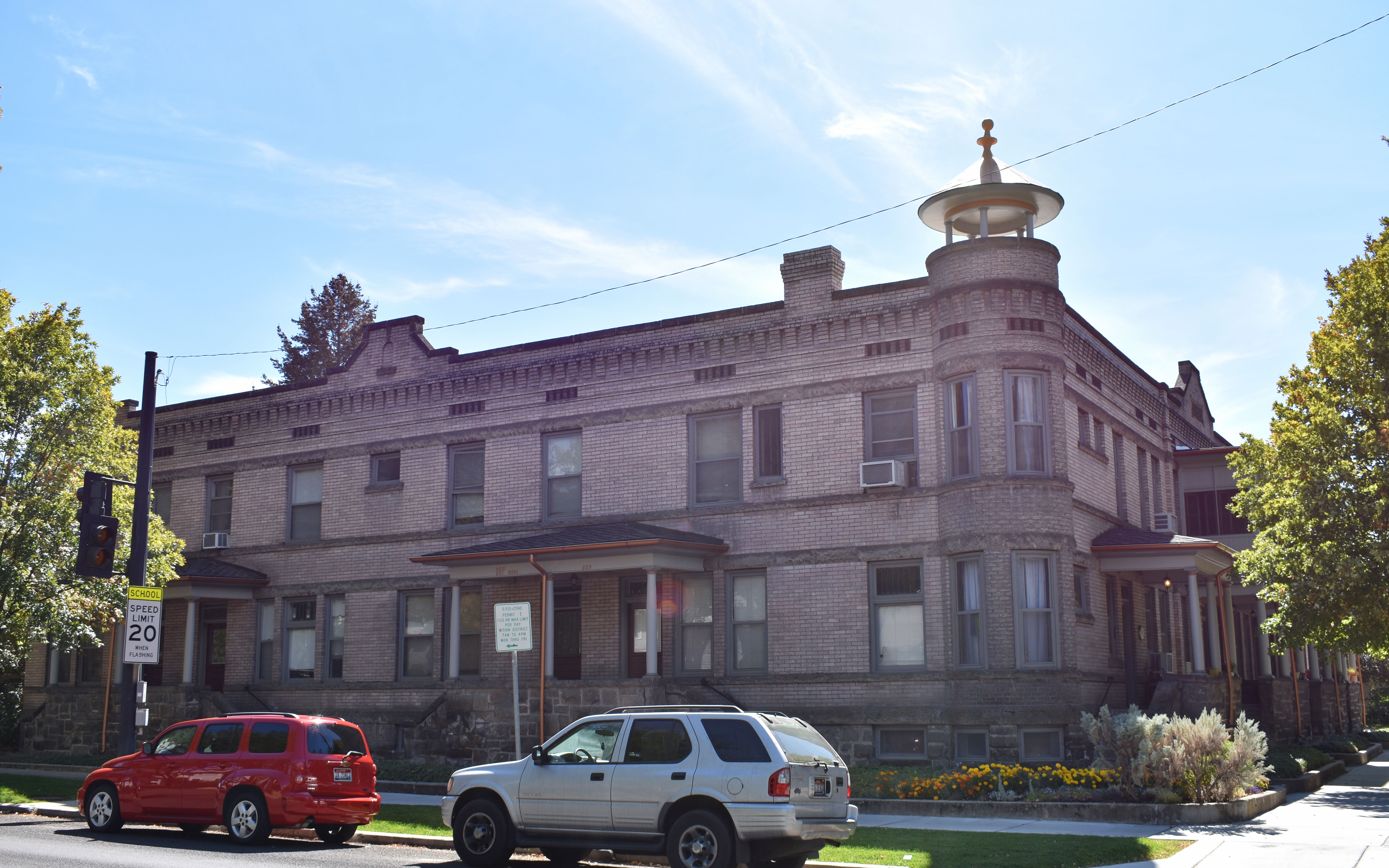
- The T.J. Jones Apartments in 2018

- Location within Idaho Location within the United States
- Location: 10th St. and Fort, Boise, Idaho
- Coordinates: 43°37′22″N 116°11′56″W
- Area: less than one acre
- Built: 1904
- Architect: Tourtellotte, John E. & Company; Rush, G. H.
- Architectural style: Renaissance, Late Medieval
- MPS: Tourtellotte and Hummel Architecture TR
- NRHP reference No.: 82000216
- Added to NRHP: November 17, 1982

The T.J. Jones Apartments in Boise, Idaho, is a 2-story, brick and stone building originally designed in 1904 by Tourtellotte & Co. and expanded in 1911 by Tourtellotte and Hummel. The structure features a prominent Queen Anne corner turret, but Renaissance Revival characteristics also were discovered in preparation for adding the building to the National Register of Historic Places in 1982.

The original design included 12 2-story apartments, and after the building was expanded in 1911, it contained 17 2-story apartments. The foundation and load bearing walls were designed for a 4-story building to be completed at a future date, but the building has remained a 2-story structure.

== Thomas J. Jones ==
Thomas J. Jones was an attorney who moved from Nebraska and settled in Boise City in 1890. Jones was active in the local populist movement, and he owned mining interests in Idaho.

== See also ==
- Friedline Apartments
- National Register of Historic Places listings in Ada County, Idaho
