= Morris Hill Cemetery Mausoleum =

- U.S. National Register of Historic Places
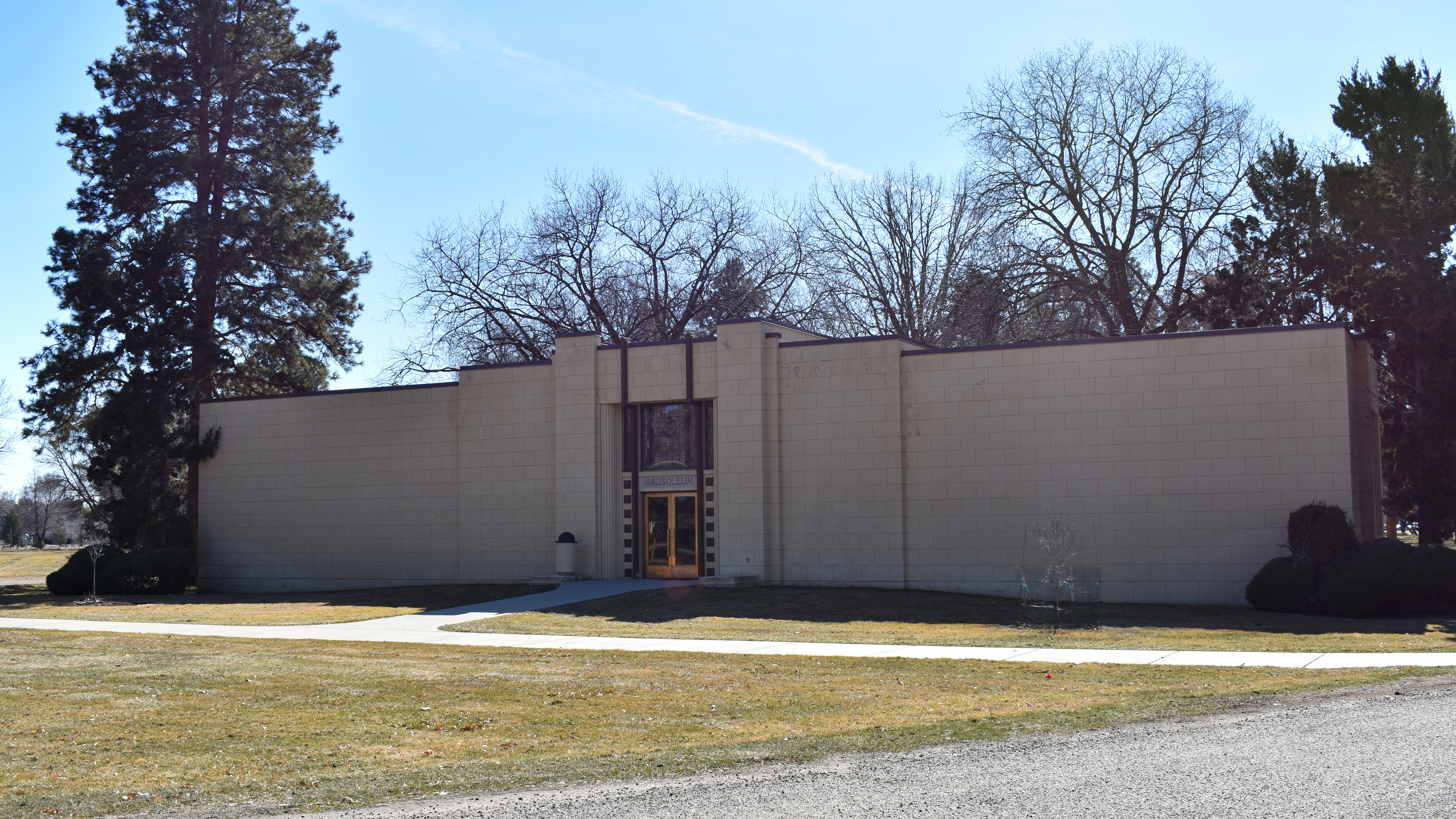
- The Morris Hill Cemetery Mausoleum in 2019

- Location within the United States Location within Idaho
- Location: Morris Hill Cemetery, Boise, Idaho
- Coordinates: 43°36′27″N 116°13′45″W
- Area: less than one acre
- Built: 1937; 89 years ago
- Architect: Tourtellotte & Hummel
- Architectural style: Moderne, Modern Movement, Art Deco
- MPS: Tourtellotte and Hummel Architecture TR
- NRHP reference No.: 82000226
- Added to NRHP: November 17, 1982

The Morris Hill Cemetery Mausoleum in Boise, Idaho, was designed by Tourtellotte & Hummel and constructed in 1937. The Art Deco, reinforced concrete building includes stained glass windows at the end of each wing, and a central stained glass window is across from a single, bronze door entry. The mausoleum was added to the National Register of Historic Places in 1982.

The mausoleum is managed by Boise Parks and Recreation. It was constructed after a successful public offering of subscription sales promoted by George D. Mason of Glendale, California. The mausoleum was dedicated by Frank A. Rhea in 1938.

== Notable interments ==
- William Borah (1865–1940), U.S. Senator from Idaho
- Joe Albertson (1906–1993), founder of the Albertsons grocery store chain

== See also ==
- John Green Mausoleum
- Joseph Kinney Mausoleum
- National Register of Historic Places listings in Ada County, Idaho
