= Memorial Gymnasium (University of Idaho) =

- U.S. National Register of Historic Places
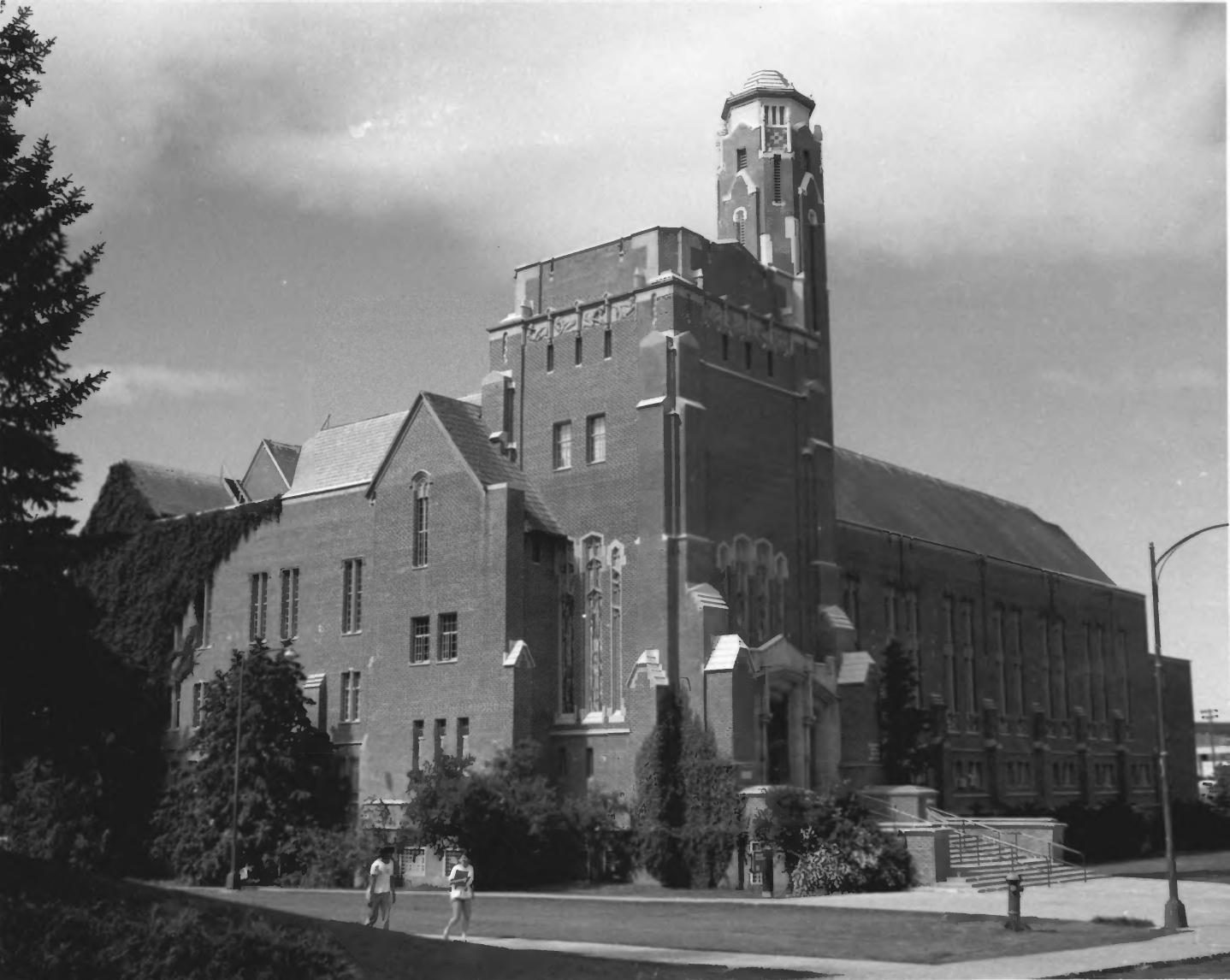
- View from northeast in 1976
- Location: 1001 University Ave. University of Idaho; Moscow, Idaho, U.S.
- Coordinates: 46.7265°N 117.014°W
- Area: 0.3 acres (0.12 ha)
- Built: 1927–28
- Architect: David C. Lange; T. Pritchard - ass't
- Architectural style: Tudor-Gothic heavily buttressed
- NRHP reference No.: 77000466
- Added to NRHP: October 10, 1977

Memorial Gymnasium
- "Mem Gym"
- Location in the United States Location in Idaho
- Interactive map of Memorial Gymnasium
- Full name: War Memorial Gymnasium
- Address: 1001 University Ave.
- Location: University of Idaho; Moscow, Idaho, U.S.
- Elevation: 2,600 feet (790 m) AMSL
- Owner: University of Idaho
- Operator: University of Idaho
- Capacity: 2,500
- Surface: hardwood

Construction
- Groundbreaking: 1927 (summer)
- Built: 1927–28
- Opened: 1928 (November), 98 years ago
- Renovated: 1954
- Expanded: 1951–52
- Cost: $616,767 - (original) ($11.6 million in 2025)
- Architects: David C. Lange; Theodore Pritchard - ass't
- Structural engineer: A.T. Schenck
- General contractors: Victor N. Jones & Assoc. - Boise

Tenants
- Idaho Vandals (NCAA) (1928–present) men's basketball (1928–76, 2020–21) women's basketball (1974–76, 2020–21) women's volleyball

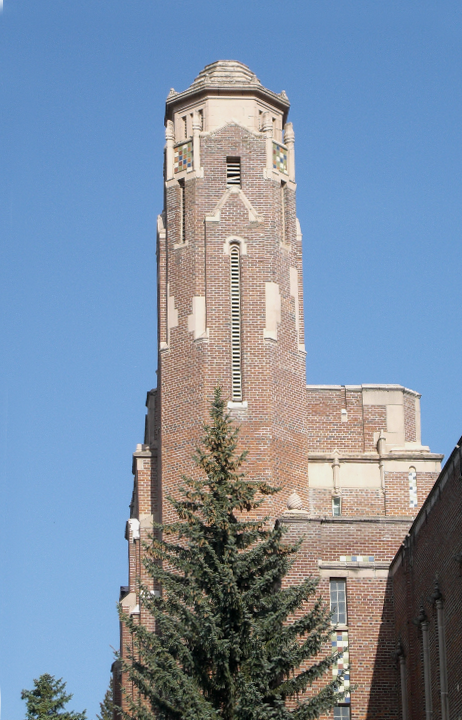
Gym tower's west face in 2007

War Memorial Gymnasium is a 2,500-seat multi-purpose indoor arena in the northwest United States, on the campus of the University of Idaho in Moscow, Idaho. Opened 98 years ago in November 1928, the venue honors state residents who gave their lives in the service of their country in World War I.

The architectural style is Tudor-Gothic and is heavily buttressed; the chief architect was David C. Lange, the head of the university's architecture department. The west end addition was built from 1951–52, and the building was renovated in 1954. Ivy partially covers the brick and concrete exterior, which is decorated with crouching football player gargoyles and stained glass windows. The elevation at street level is approximately 2,600 feet (790 m) above sea level.

Its predecessor was the original gymnasium (and armory), located directly east; constructed in 1904; it has been reconfigured and continues on campus as the "Art and Architecture South" building. During its time as the varsity basketball venue, it was also a library, with bookshelves along the walls. After the Memorial Gym opened, it became the women's gym.

Memorial Gymnasium was the primary home of Vandal basketball until January 1976, replaced by the newly-enclosed Kibbie Dome; the Dome's basketball configuration was renamed "Cowan Spectrum" in early 2001. Future hall of famer Gus Johnson played for the Vandals during the 1962–63 season, and the "Mem Gym" was frequently sold out, with the attendance estimated at 3,800. During the 1940s and early 1950s, Idaho had a nationally prominent boxing team; over five thousand attended a dual meet against Palouse neighbor Washington State in 1950. It was dropped by the university as an intercollegiate sport in 1954, and discontinued by the NCAA after 1960.

The Memorial Gym is the current home court of Vandal women's volleyball, with a portable Taraflex court since 1999. It occasionally hosts early season basketball games on the hardwood, depending upon the late season football schedule, and the facility is used extensively for physical education classes, intramurals, and open recreation. Commencement ceremonies for the university were traditionally held in the gym from 1929, through 1975. The Kibbie Dome has hosted the primary ceremony for all graduates since 1976, and the Mem Gym is one of several campus venues used for the subsequent individual college ceremonies for the awarding of diplomas.

While the 2020–21 school year was initially expected to be the last for Mem Gym as a varsity athletics venue, following the 2021 completion of the 4,200-seat Idaho Central Credit Union Arena (ICCU Arena), that plan changed. ICCU Arena became the new home of Vandals men's and women's basketball, but volleyball remained in Mem Gym.

At just 49 years of age, it was added to the National Register of Historic Places in 1977. The narrow swimming pool in the basement of the Mem Gym was retired in 1970, when the new swim center opened. The Kibbie Dome lacked locker rooms for its first seven years, so the Vandals and visiting teams continued to dress in the Memorial Gym. The completion of the East End Addition in the fall of 1982 ended the long trek, frequently in rain or snow during basketball season.

== See also ==
- National Register of Historic Places listings in Latah County, Idaho
- List of NCAA Division I basketball arenas
