= Willis Mickle House =

- U.S. National Register of Historic Places
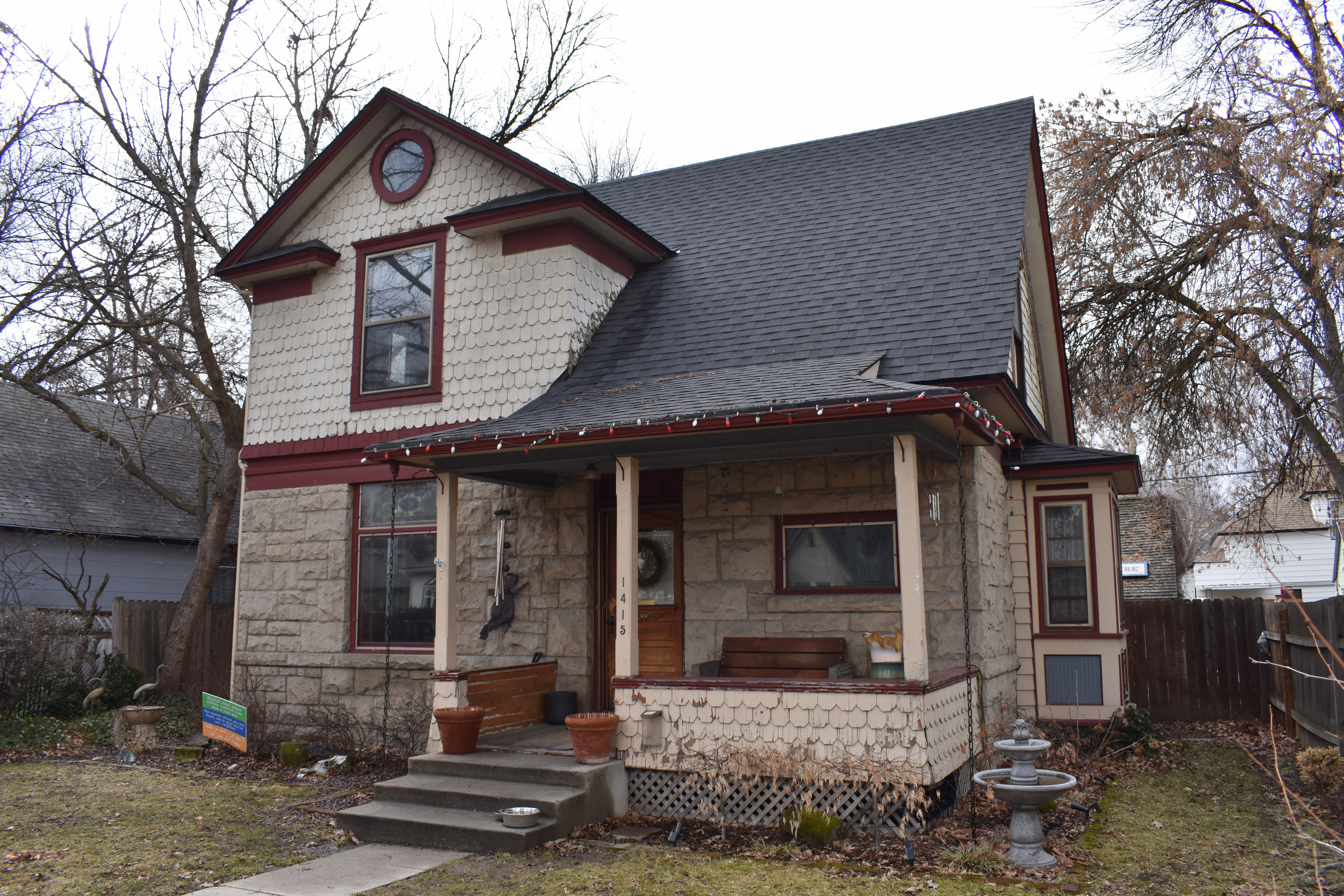
- The Willis Mickle House in 2019

- Location within Idaho Location within the United States
- Location: 1415 N. 8th St., Boise, Idaho
- Coordinates: 43°37′38″N 116°11′49″W
- Area: less than one acre
- Built: 1898
- Architect: Tourtellotte, John E. & Company
- Architectural style: Queen Anne
- MPS: Tourtellotte and Hummel Architecture TR
- NRHP reference No.: 82000224
- Added to NRHP: November 17, 1982

The Willis Mickle House in Boise, Idaho, is a 1 1/2-story Queen Anne cottage designed by Tourtellotte & Co. and constructed in 1898. The house features a prominent, left front facing gable with dormer that rises above a right front porch. The first floor outer walls are of random course Boise sandstone. The house was listed on the National Register of Historic Places in 1982.

Willis and Marie (Keeffe) Mickle were married in 1898 and were original owners of the house, which the Idaho Statesman described as "a pleasing and substantial innovation in Boise building." Willis Mickle was superintendent of Capitol Electric Light, Motor and Gas Company, and he had been the electrician of the Boise volunteer fire department. The Mickles were active in local politics, and Marie Mickle served as clerk of elections for Boise Precinct No. 9. By 1916 the couple had moved to Portland, Oregon.
