= Joseph Kinney Mausoleum =

Historic site in Ada County, Idaho, US

- Kinney, Joseph, Mausoleum
- U.S. National Register of Historic Places
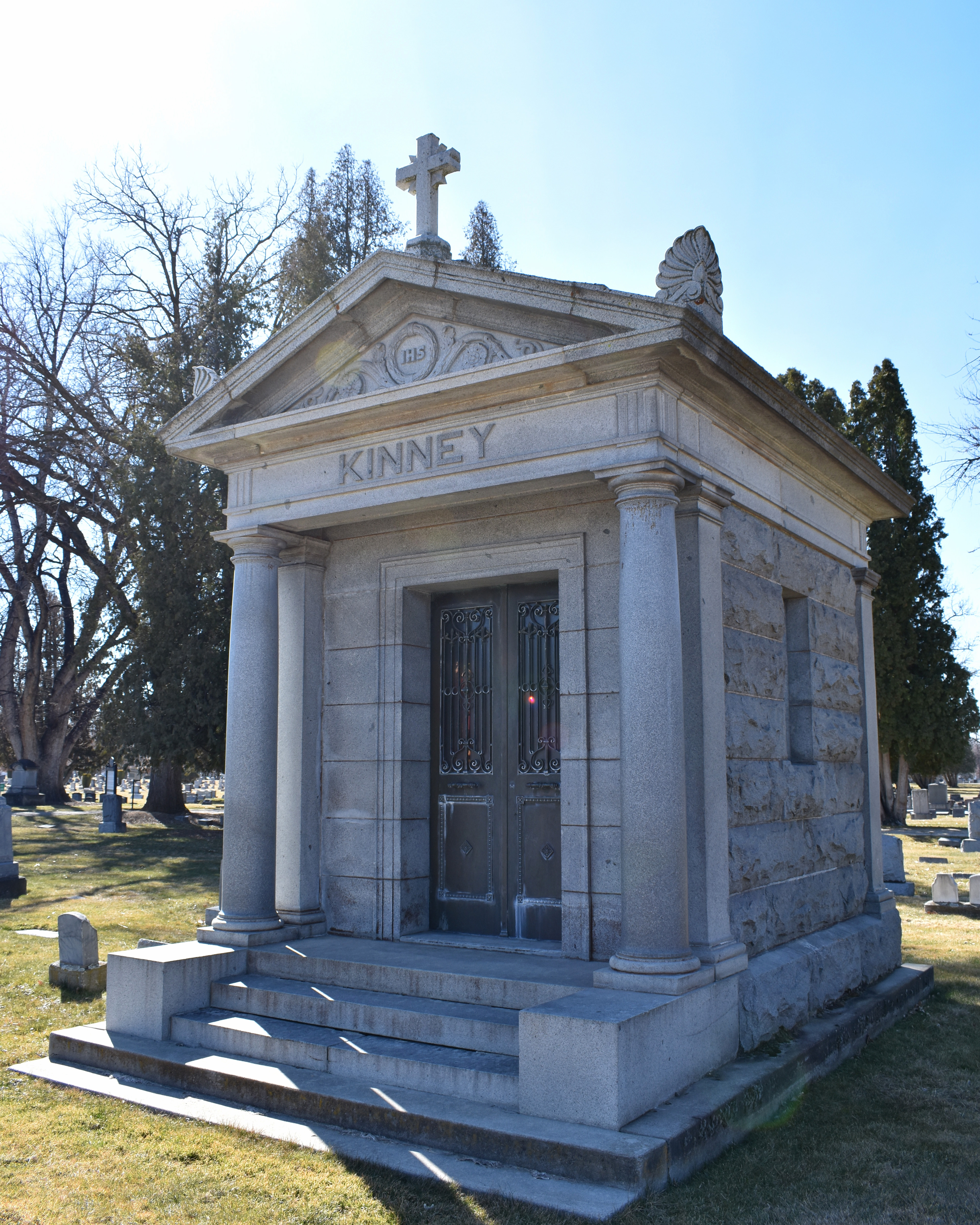
- The Joseph Kinney Mausoleum in 2019

- Location within Idaho Location within the United States
- Location: Morris Hill Cemetery, Boise, Idaho
- Coordinates: 43.609509°N 116.228729°W
- Area: less than one acre
- Built: 1905
- Architect: Tourtellotte, John E. & Company
- Architectural style: Classical Revival
- MPS: Tourtellotte and Hummel Architecture TR
- NRHP reference No.: 82000218
- Added to NRHP: November 17, 1982

The Joseph Kinney Mausoleum at Morris Hill Cemetery in Boise, Idaho, is a Classical Revival entombment designed by Tourtellotte & Co. and constructed in 1905. The structure is made of granite and features a Doric portico with bronze doors below a recessed pediment with a simple stone carving. Corner pilasters frame two side windows. The mausoleum was added to the National Register of Historic Places in 1982.

== Joseph Kinney ==
Joseph Kinney served in the Union Army of the American Civil War and was discharged in 1866. He traveled to Silver Bow, Montana, as a mining prospector, then later in 1866 he settled in Boise. Kinney owned the Arc Light Saloon, and he was a stockholder in the Idaho Building & Loan and in the Boise Bank of Commerce. Kinney owned a horse ranch in Butte, and he enjoyed horse racing.

Kinney may have suffered from COPD, and he and Margaret Kinney had traveled to Oakland for health reasons. When Kinney died at Oakland in 1905, his remains were returned to Boise and placed in a temporary vault while the Joseph Kinney Mausoleum was constructed. At the time, the Idaho Statesman said of the mausoleum that it was "probably the finest structure of its kind in the state."

Margaret Kinney remarried and later was known as Margaret Armstrong. Although a resident of Oakland, she continued to own property and to conduct business in Boise.

== Joseph Kinney House ==
The Joseph Kinney house is a contributing resource in Boise's Warm Springs Avenue Historic District. The house was designed by Tourtellotte & Co. in 1903 and completed in 1904.

== See also ==
- John Green Mausoleum
- Morris Hill Cemetery Mausoleum
- National Register of Historic Places listings in Ada County, Idaho
