= University of Idaho Gymnasium and Armory =

- University of Idaho; Gymnasium and Armory
- U.S. National Register of Historic Places
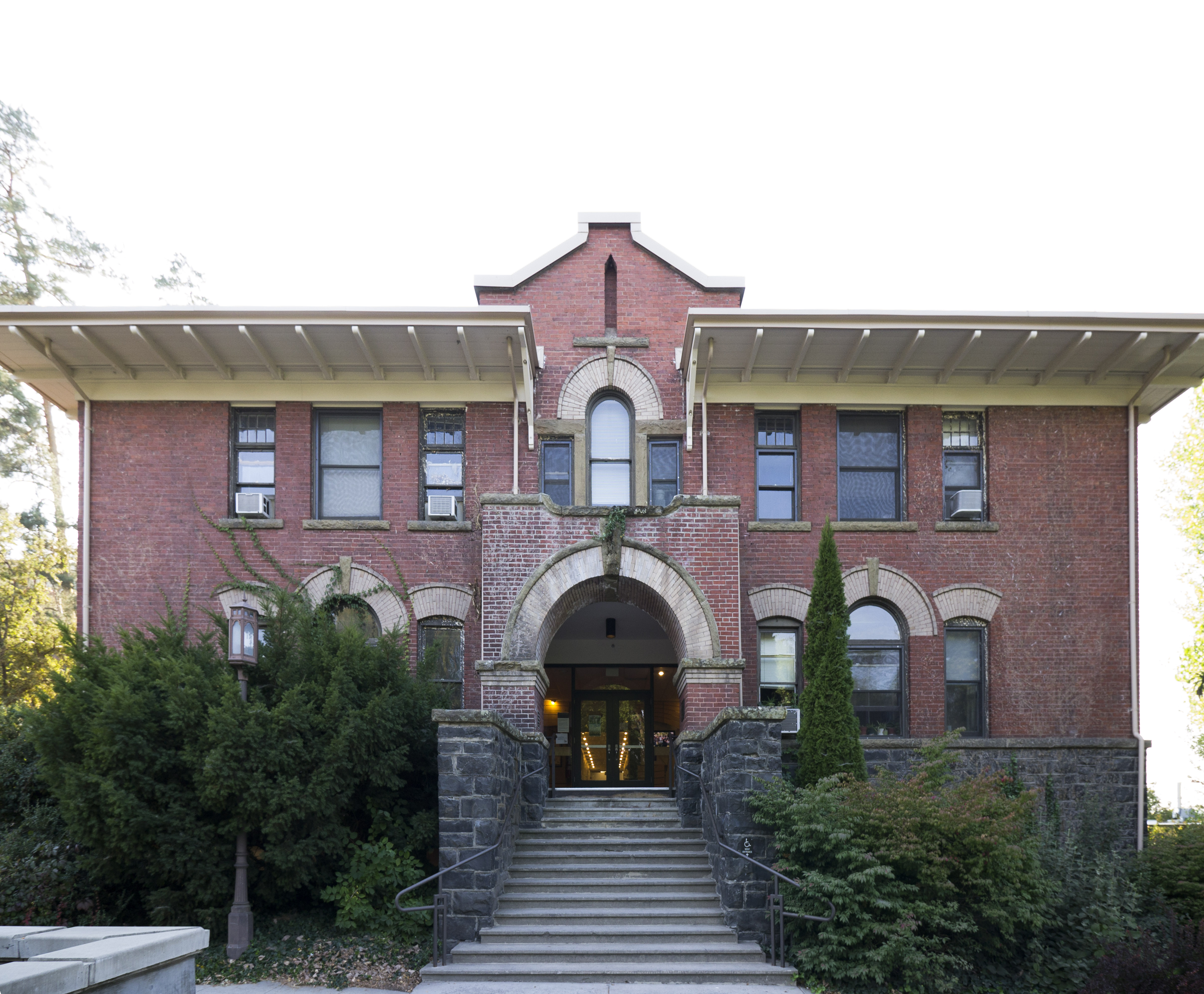
- View from east in 2012

- Location within Idaho Location within the United States
- Location: 951 Campus Drive; University of Idaho; Moscow, Idaho, U.S.
- Coordinates: 46°43′35″N 117°00′44″W
- Area: 2.5 acres (1.0 ha)
- Built: 1903; 123 years ago
- Architect: John E. Tourtellotte
- Architectural style: Romanesque-eclectic
- MPS: Tourtellotte and Hummel Architecture TR
- NRHP reference No.: 83000287
- Added to NRHP: January 3, 1983; 43 years ago

The University of Idaho Gymnasium and Armory is a historic building in the northwest United States, on the campus of the University of Idaho in Moscow, Idaho. On the southwest corner of Campus Drive and University Avenue, just northwest of the Administration Building, it was built as a gym and armory in 1903.

In November 1928, the new Memorial Gymnasium opened, and it became the women's gym. When the new women's gym (Physical Education Building) opened in 1970, the older building was remodeled and renamed Art and Architecture South.

The building was designed by John E. Tourtellotte of Boise in the Romanesque Revival architectural style; it has been listed on the National Register of Historic Places since January 3, 1983. The approximate elevation at street level is 2,620 feet (800 m) above sea level.
