= Charles Paynton House =

- U.S. National Register of Historic Places
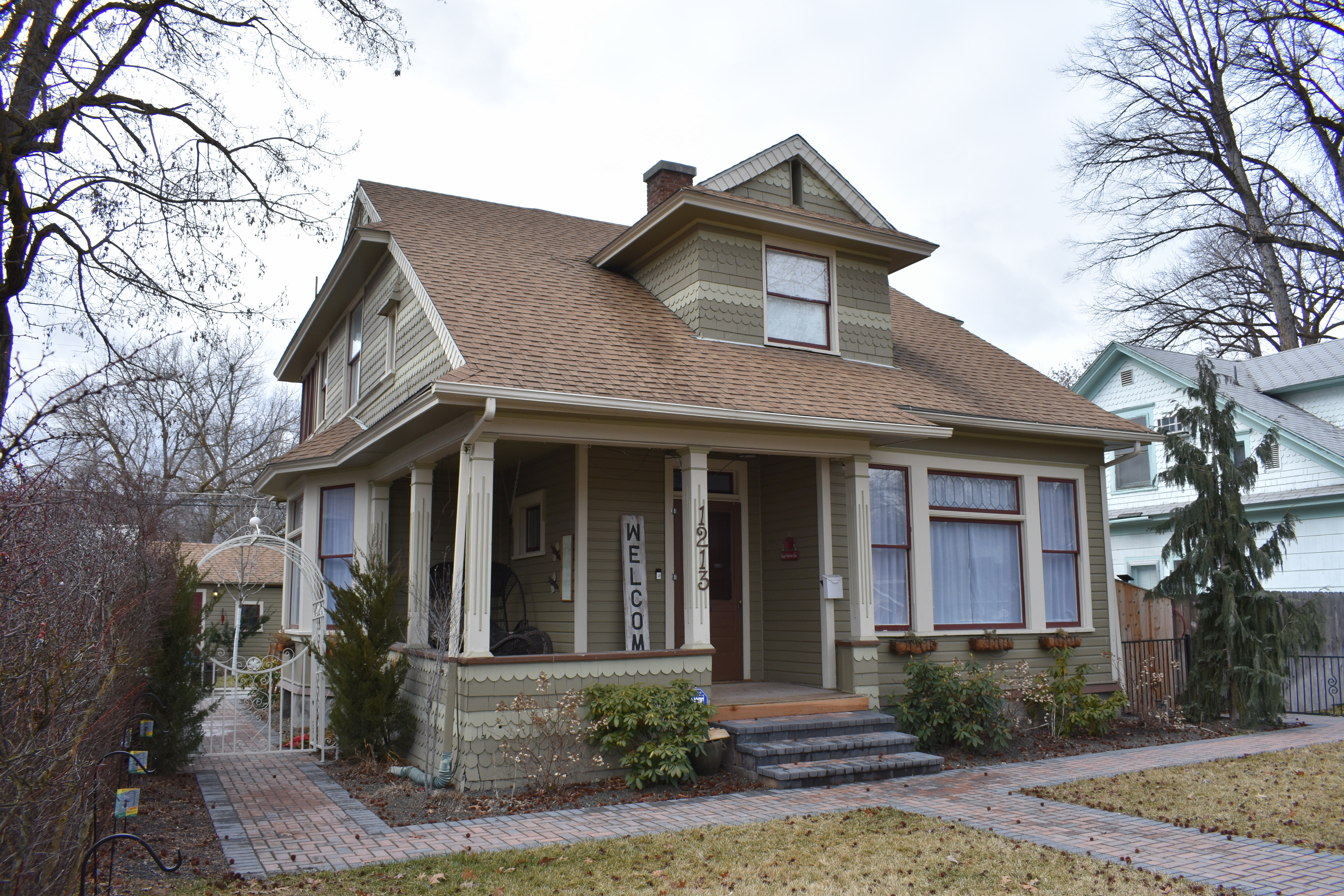
- The Charles Paynton House in 2019

- Location within Idaho Location within the United States
- Location: 1213 N. 8th St., Boise, Idaho
- Coordinates: 43°37′32″N 116°11′49″W
- Area: less than one acre
- Built: 1900
- Built by: William Houtz
- Architect: Tourtellotte, John E & Company
- Architectural style: Shingled Colonial
- MPS: Tourtellotte and Hummel Architecture TR
- NRHP reference No.: 82000232
- Added to NRHP: November 17, 1982

The Charles Paynton House in Boise, Idaho, is a 1 1/2-story, Colonial Revival or Shingled Colonial house designed by Tourtellotte & Co. and constructed in 1900. The house features a lateral ridge beam with side facing gables with a smaller, front facing gabled dormer window above an L-shaped porch. Contractor William Houtz built the modest 6-room cottage, and in 1901 it was considered a model of good cottages.

The house was added to the National Register of Historic Places in 1982.

== Charles Paynton ==
Charles Paynton was a Boise pioneer who arrived in Idaho Territory in 1876. He apprenticed at The Idaho Statesman in that year and continued for eight years as a printer and an editor at the newspaper. He also served as secretary of the Boise volunteer firefighters association. Paynton later worked for the U.S. Surveyor General's office as an accountant and a clerk. He retired from the office in 1928 and moved to Seattle.

=== St. Luke's Boise Medical Center ===
The Charles Paynton House, built in 1900, is not the only Paynton residence of historic interest. In 1891 Paynton built a larger, Queen Anne style house designed by E.M. Leach and constructed at the corner of First and Bannock Streets. In 1897 Paynton rented the house to F.J. Mills, and in 1902 the house was purchased by Bishop Funsten and converted into St. Luke's 6-bed hospital. The house later was demolished as St. Luke's Boise Medical Center evolved into its current state.

== See also ==
- National Register of Historic Places listings in Ada County, Idaho
