= J. N. Wallace House =

Historic building in Boise, Idaho, USA

- U.S. National Register of Historic Places
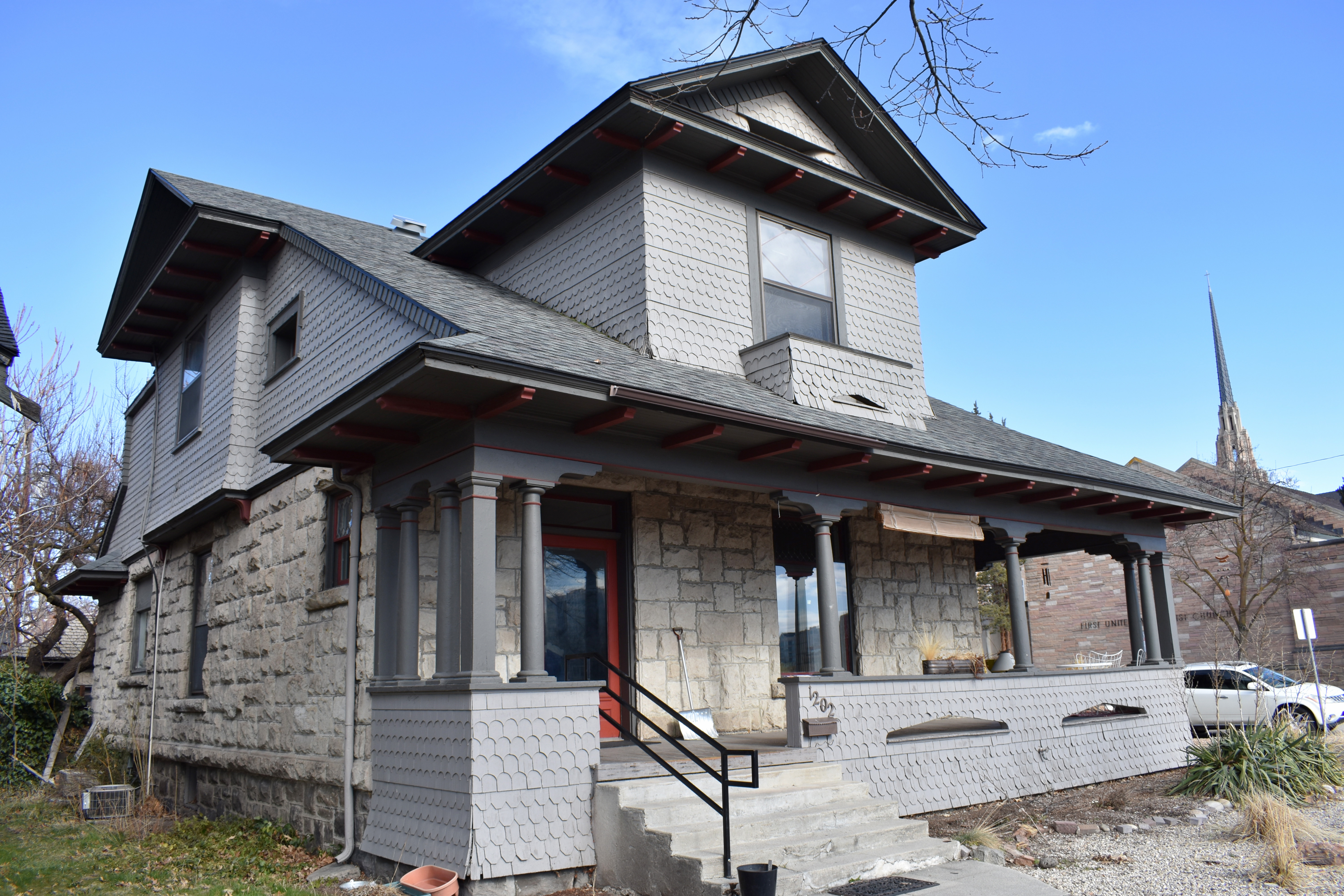
- The J.N. Wallace House in 2019

- Location within Idaho Location within the United States
- Location: 1202 Franklin St., Boise, Idaho
- Coordinates: 43°37′23″N 116°12′10″W
- Area: less than one acre
- Built: 1903
- Architect: Tourtellotte, John E. & Company
- Architectural style: Colonial Revival
- MPS: Tourtellotte and Hummel Architecture TR
- NRHP reference No.: 82000251
- Added to NRHP: November 17, 1982

The J.N. Wallace House in Boise, Idaho, is a 2-story, shingled Colonial Revival house designed by Tourtellotte & Co. and constructed in 1903. The first floor features a veneer of random course sandstone, and shingles of various shapes decorate the wraparound porch and the second floor. Deep, pedimented gables with dormer and dimple windows characterize the roof. Outer walls on the porch and second floor are flared. The house was added to the National Register of Historic Places in 1982.

Plans for the Wallace House were drawn in 1903, but the house may not have been completed until 1905. The Wallaces sold the house to C.H. Lingenfelter in 1908.

== John N. Wallace ==
John Wallace (May 24, 1834—April 20, 1922) was an 1861 pioneer and gold prospector who visited what became Idaho Territory but did not remain. In 1863 he returned to the territory and settled in West Bannock. In 1877 Wallace moved to Boise City and began building rental houses. He was active in politics in the 1890s, although he may not have held elective office above city councilor. Wallace remained interested in mining, and he was president of the Van Anda Mining and Milling Company.

A daughter of John and Jennie Wallace, Della Wallace, married John Tourtellotte, architect of the Wallace House, in 1893.

== See also ==
- National Register of Historic Places listings in Ada County, Idaho
