= Brunzell House =

- U.S. National Register of Historic Places
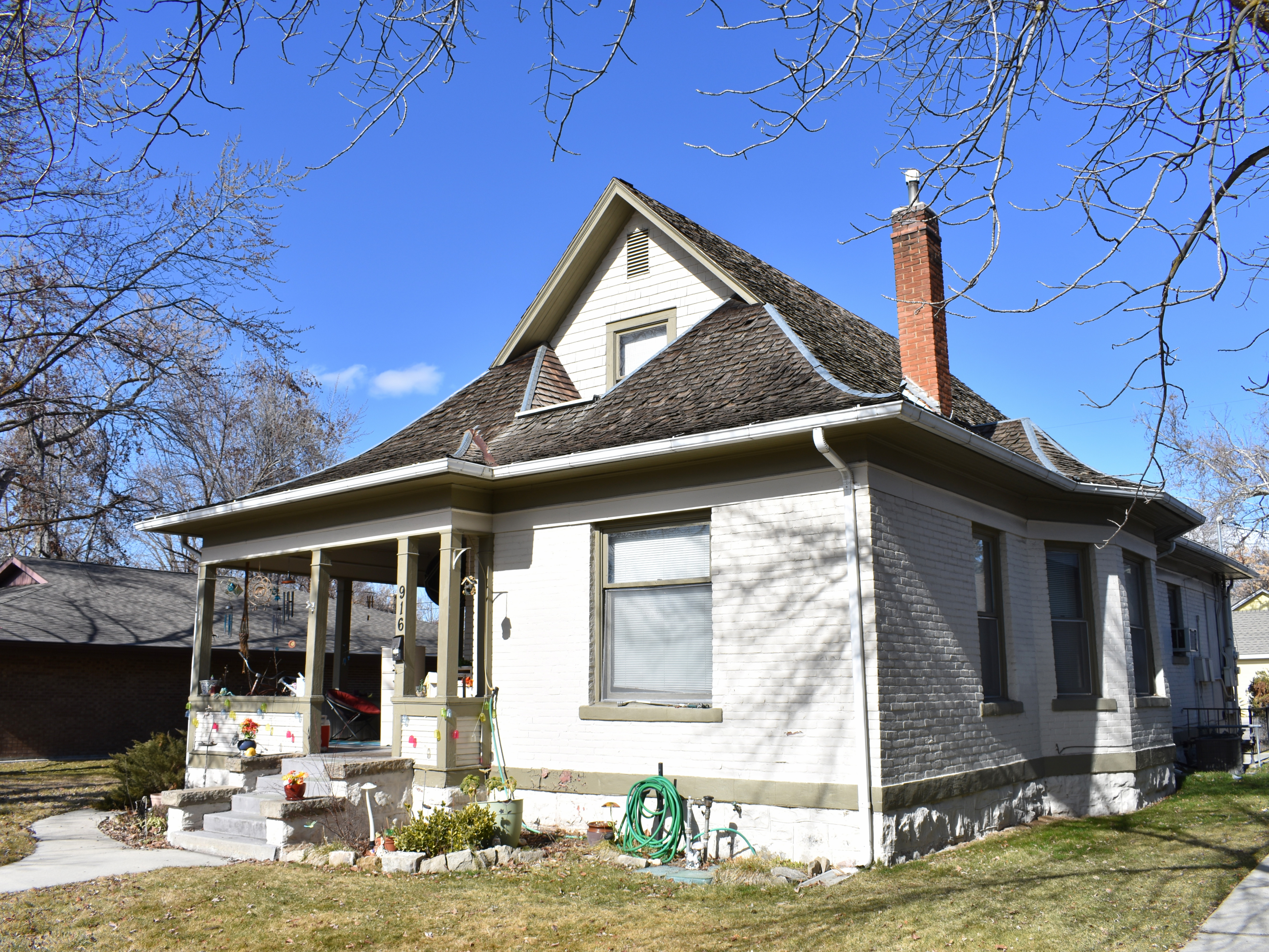
- The Brunzell House in 2019

- Location within Idaho Location within the United States
- Location: 916 Franklin St., Boise, Idaho
- Coordinates: 43°37′16″N 116°12′00″W
- Area: less than one acre
- Built: 1908
- Architect: Tourtellotte, John E. & Company
- Architectural style: Bungalow/craftsman
- MPS: Tourtellotte and Hummel Architecture TR
- NRHP reference No.: 82000182
- Added to NRHP: November 17, 1982

The Brunzell House in Boise, Idaho, is a one-and-a-half-story, brick and wood Bungalow designed by Tourtellotte & Co. and constructed in 1908. The house features Colonial Revival decorations, including deeply flared eaves. The house was added to the National Register of Historic Places in 1982. It also is a contributing resource in the Fort Street Historic District.

== History ==
The Brunzell House was commissioned by John M. Brunzell, a Nampa resident and former postmaster and state representative from Reynolds Creek in Owyhee County. Brunzell never occupied the house, and he may have intended it either as a rental or as a gift to his nephew, Fred Brunzell, who owned lot 3, block 84, where the house was constructed.

Fred Brunzell purchased property for the house in 1892. He and Oline Brunzell lived at the house from about 1912 until her death in 1918, but they were not the original residents.

In 1908 Victoria L. Eoff rented the newly constructed house. She and her late husband, Alfred Eoff, had been owners of the Eoff-Brady House, designed by John E. Tourtellotte and constructed in 1897. In 1911 Mrs. Eoff moved into the newly constructed Victoria Louise Eoff House, designed by Tourtellotte & Hummel. Both Eoff houses are contributing resources in Boise's West Warm Springs Historic District.

In 1919 Fred Brunzell transferred the house to his children, Selma B. Getchell and Alvin O. Brunzell. Getchell later sold her share of the house to her brother in 1919. Fred Brunzell died in 1920 at the age of 86.

== See also ==
- National Register of Historic Places listings in Ada County, Idaho
