= Mrs. A. F. Rossi House =

- U.S. National Register of Historic Places
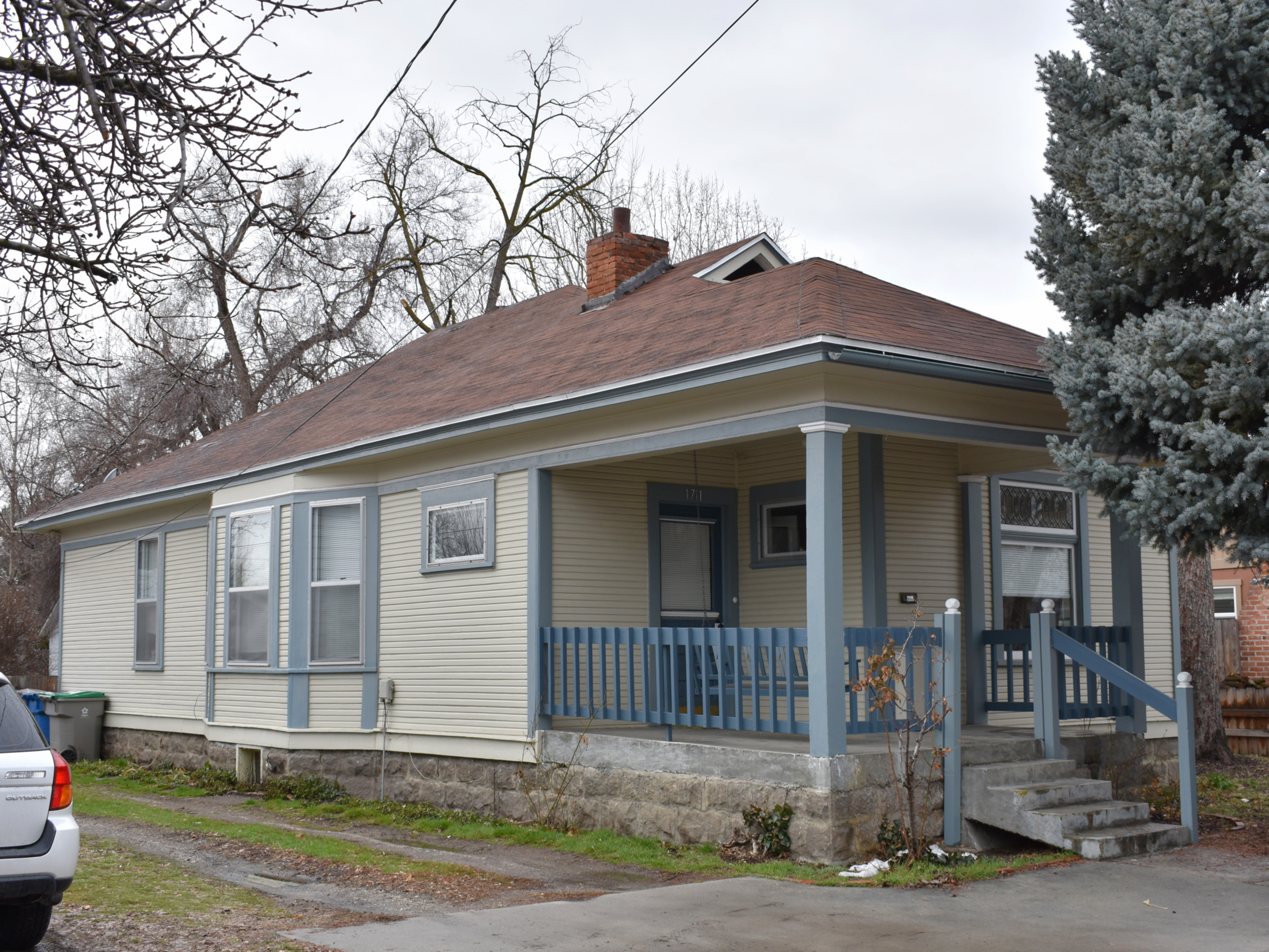
- The Mrs. A.F. Rossi House in 2019

- Location within Idaho Location within the United States
- Location: 1711 Boise Ave., Boise, Idaho
- Coordinates: 43°35′48″N 116°12′07″W
- Area: less than one acre
- Built: 1906
- Built by: Carpenter & Thompson
- Architect: Tourtellotte & Co.
- Architectural style: Colonial Revival
- MPS: Tourtellotte and Hummel Architecture TR
- NRHP reference No.: 82000238
- Added to NRHP: November 17, 1982

The Mrs. A.F. Rossi House in Boise, Idaho, is a one-story cottage in the Colonial Revival style with "proto-bungaloid" elements. The house was designed by Tourtellotte & Co. and constructed in 1906. Its prominent feature is an outset, left front center porch. In 1982, the house was added to the National Register of Historic Places.

Lola L. Lindsey and Alexander F. Rossi were married February 25, 1903, in Boise. Alexander Rossi was associated with W.H. Ridenbaugh in logging and lumber enterprises until 1908, and they owned the A.F. Rossi Company, a South Boise lumber mill. In 1905, sister and brother Adaline Bennett and Alex Rossi deeded property in South Boise to Lola Rossi, and on the lot a six-room cottage was constructed in 1906 according to plans drawn by Tourtellotte & Co. The Rossis may have occupied the house until 1926, when they moved to Idaho City and became proprietors of the Luna House hotel, named for original owner M.G. Luney. The hotel was identical in name to the Luna House in Lewiston, an early stagecoach stop in Idaho Territory. (Note: Researchers preparing the nomination form for the National Register of Historic Places may have confused Alexander F. Rossi with his father, Alexander A. Rossi. Tourtellotte & Co. had designed a house for the senior Rossi and his family including his son, Lex, and it was constructed in 1902 at the corner of 1st and Jefferson Streets in Boise. The house burned later that year while the senior Rossi was bedridden with a broken hip, and Lex was credited with carrying his father to safety. In 1905 the senior Rossi became injured again in a buggy accident. Alexander A. Rossi died in February, 1906, but his son, Alexander F. Rossi, died in October, 1947.)
