= B. S. Varian House =

Historic house in Idaho, United States

- U.S. National Register of Historic Places
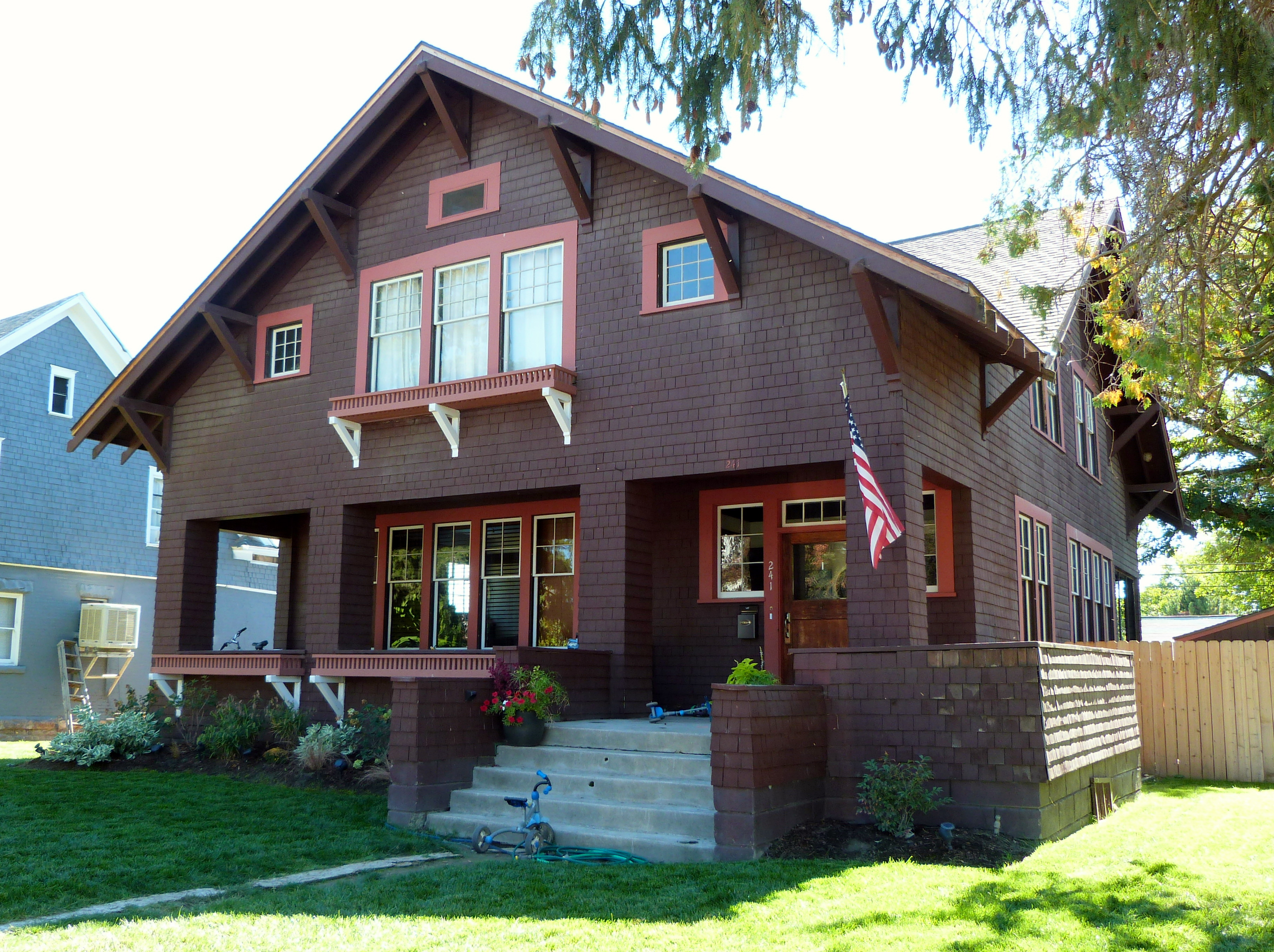

- Location within Idaho Location within the United States
- Location: 241 Main St., Weiser, Idaho
- Coordinates: 44.247070°N 116.973395°W
- Area: less than one acre
- Built: 1909
- Architect: Tourtellotte, John E. & Company
- Architectural style: Bungalow
- MPS: Tourtellotte and Hummel Architecture TR
- NRHP reference No.: 82000382
- Added to NRHP: November 17, 1982

The B. S. Varian House, at 241 Main St. in Weiser, Idaho, is an architect-designed house which was built in 1909. It was designed by John E. Tourtellotte and Company.

It is a large Bungalow-style house with both front-facing and cross gables. It is unusual for its size and for its shingle siding. The Idaho State Historical Society inventory of the house states: "The house is massive for a bungalow, with a thirty-six-by-fifty-four-foot perimeter and an additional cross gable which allows a full four bedrooms and a sleeping porch to be included under the low gabled roof of the upper half story."
