= Ada Odd Fellows Temple =

- U.S. National Register of Historic Places
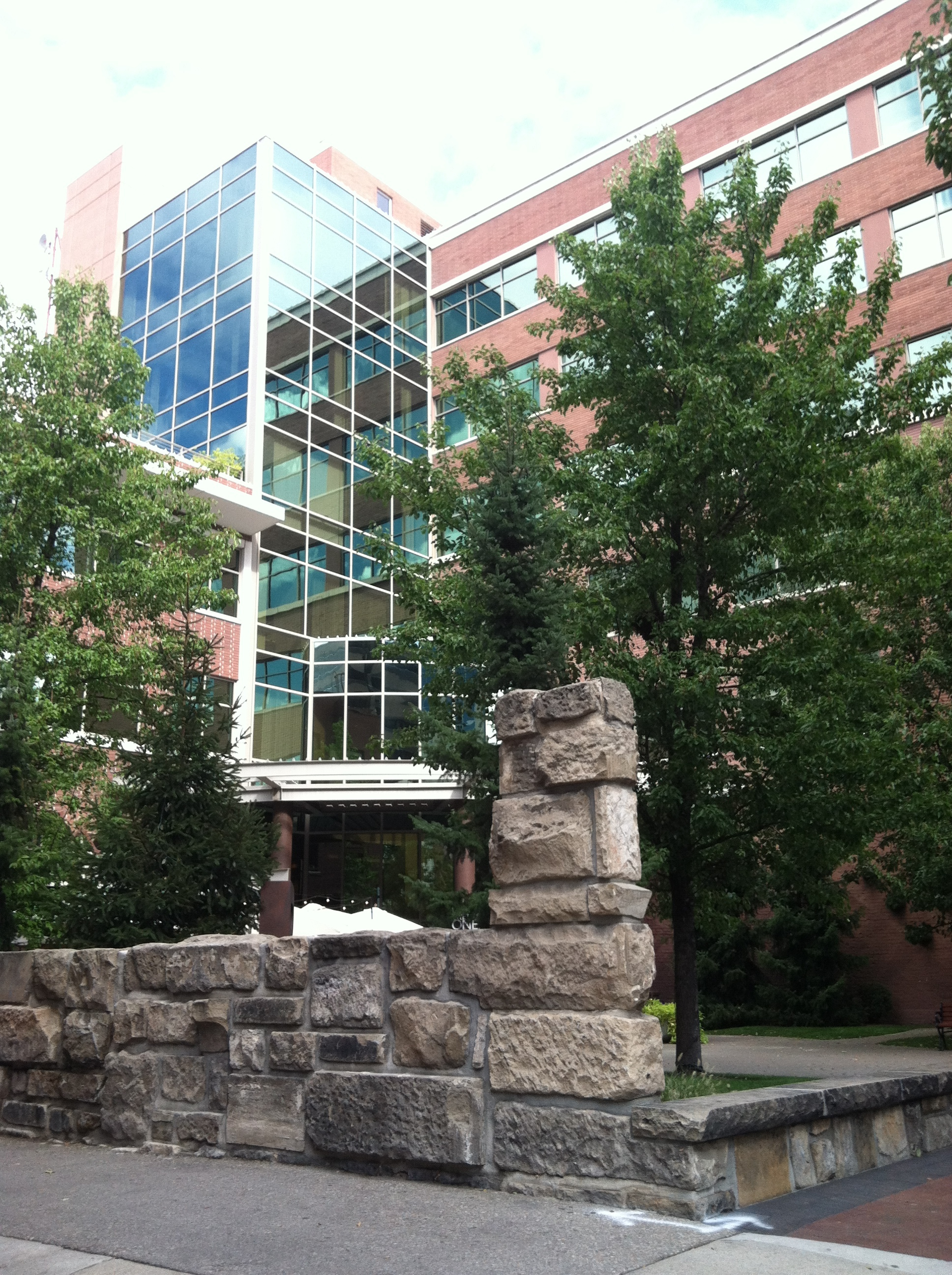
- Remains of the building's facade, with the modern Plaza 121 building in the background.

- Location within Idaho Location within the United States
- Location: 109-115 1/2 N. 9th St., Boise, Idaho
- Coordinates: 43°36′58″N 116°12′15″W
- Area: less than one acre
- Built: 1903
- Architect: John E. Tourtellotte & Company
- Architectural style: Renaissance, Late Medieval
- MPS: Tourtellotte and Hummel Architecture TR
- NRHP reference No.: 82000176
- Added to NRHP: November 17, 1982

The Ada Odd Fellows Temple stood at 109-115 1/2 N. 9th Street in Boise, Idaho. Built in 1903 by the prominent local architecture firm of Tourtellotte and Co. (later Tourtellotte & Hummel), it served as the clubhouse of the Independent Order of Odd Fellows of Ada Lodge No. 3. It was listed on the National Register of Historic Places in 1982, due largely to its association with Tourtellotte. Its sandstone masonry was quarried from nearby Table Rock.

In 1953, the north half of the building was demolished, and construction began on the First Security Building (now known as Plaza 121) in its place. Also demolished at the time was the building's original ornate, Gothic-style entrance. In 1990, the Odd Fellows sold the remaining building to First Security (now part of Wells Fargo). Over the objections of some members of the Idaho State Historical Society, First Security demolished the remaining Odd Fellows building in 1994, citing concerns about the building's condition.

In its place, First Security created a "pocket park" that included a low wall made from some of the temple's original sandstone. The remainder of the stone was donated to the Idaho Shakespeare Festival, which used it in the construction of its outdoor theater on Warm Springs Avenue, and to the Boise School District, which used it in the restoration of the Bown House, an 1879 building on the campus of Riverside Elementary School. The park only existed for a little over a decade; in 2005, the First Security Building was renovated and expanded to become Plaza 121, which covers much of the lot, although the wall built from the Odd Fellows Temple's sandstone can still be seen in front of the Berryhill & Co. restaurant that now occupies the ground floor of the site.

== See also ==
- List of Odd Fellows buildings
- National Register of Historic Places listings in Ada County, Idaho
