= Archie Larsen House =

- U.S. National Register of Historic Places
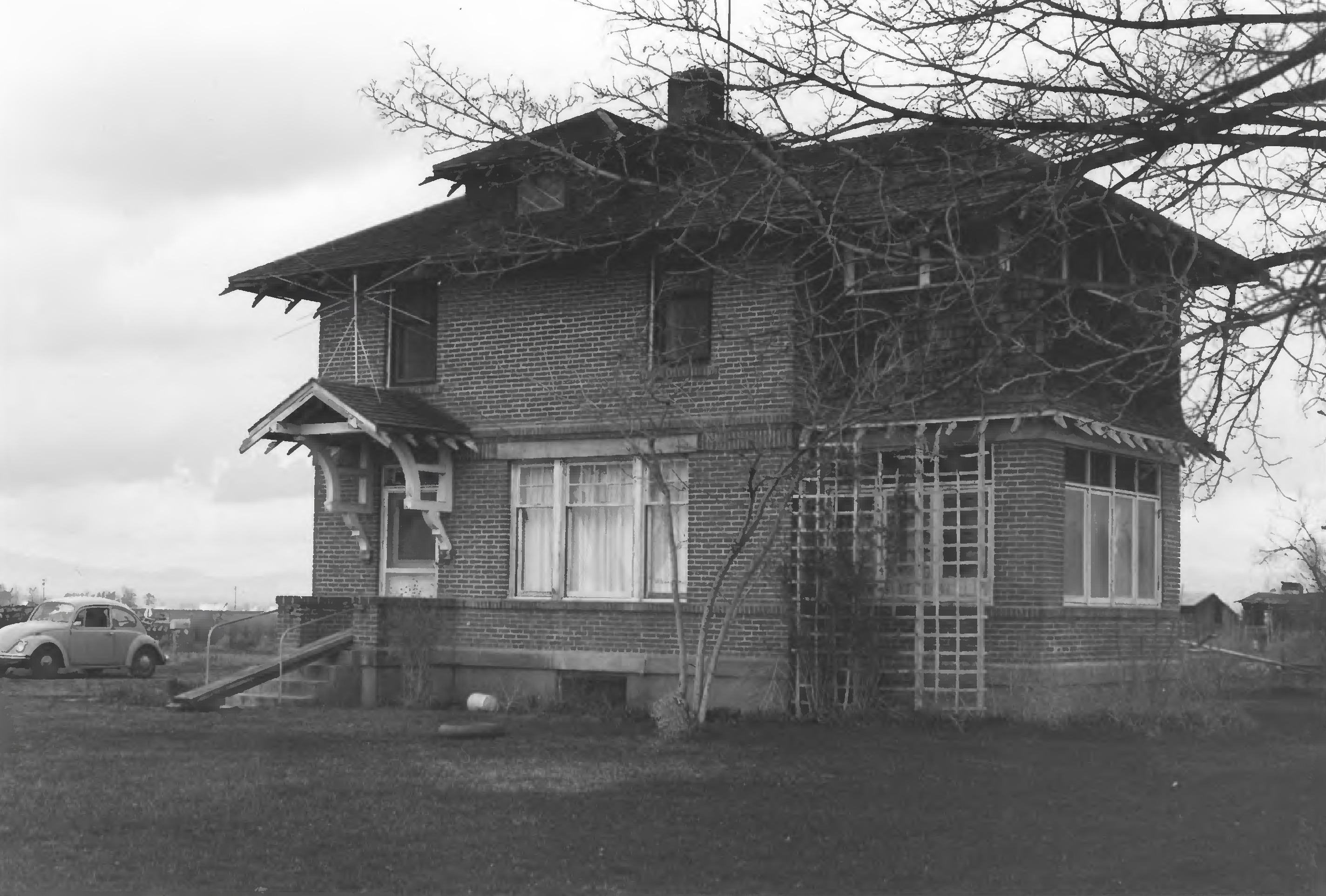

- Location within Idaho Location within the United States
- Nearest city: Weiser, Idaho
- Coordinates: 44°11′43″N 116°56′11″W
- Area: 1.5 acres (0.61 ha)
- Built: 1910
- Architect: John E. Tourtellotte & Company
- Architectural style: Bungalow/craftsman
- MPS: Tourtellotte and Hummel Architecture TR
- NRHP reference No.: 82000377
- Added to NRHP: November 17, 1982

The Archie Larsen House, in Washington County, Idaho near Weiser, Idaho, was built in 1910. It was listed on the National Register of Historic Places in 1982. The building apparently no longer exists. It was south of Weiser on Larsen Rd.

It was designed by John E. Tourtellotte & Company as a two-story brick "bungaloid" house, nearly square in plan with 28 by 26 feet (8.5 m × 7.9 m) dimensions, plus a two-story ell including a sun porch on lower level and a sleeping porch on upper.

It was deemed notable as "a spectacularly sited and beautifully developed example of a hipped-roofed two-story house with boxy massing. Like the Gakey house (site 66) it maintains in its main section the boxy hip-roofed form in a relatively vertical format, as compared to a horizontal type like the Numbers house (site 38); and it does so while introducing strong references to the bungalow mode. Here, however, the floor space of the virtually square main block is extended not to the rear in response to a narrow city lot, but to the side in a two-story sun and sleeping-porch ell. This maximizes the exposure of the house to its extraordinary closeup view of the Snake River. The execution and detail of the house are superior; it is altogether perhaps the firm's single most successful essay in a style which they generally handled well.

Archie Larsen was a Minnesotan who moved to Weiser in 1909 to become a fruit grower. When high railway tariffs made his orchards unprofitable, he became a poultry grower instead. Tourtellotte and Hummel designed not only the residence but a fine small barn with jerkin-head roof for the Larsen farm, but the barn has not survived."
