= A. K. Steunenberg House =

Historic NRHP building in Caldwell, Idaho

- U.S. National Register of Historic Places
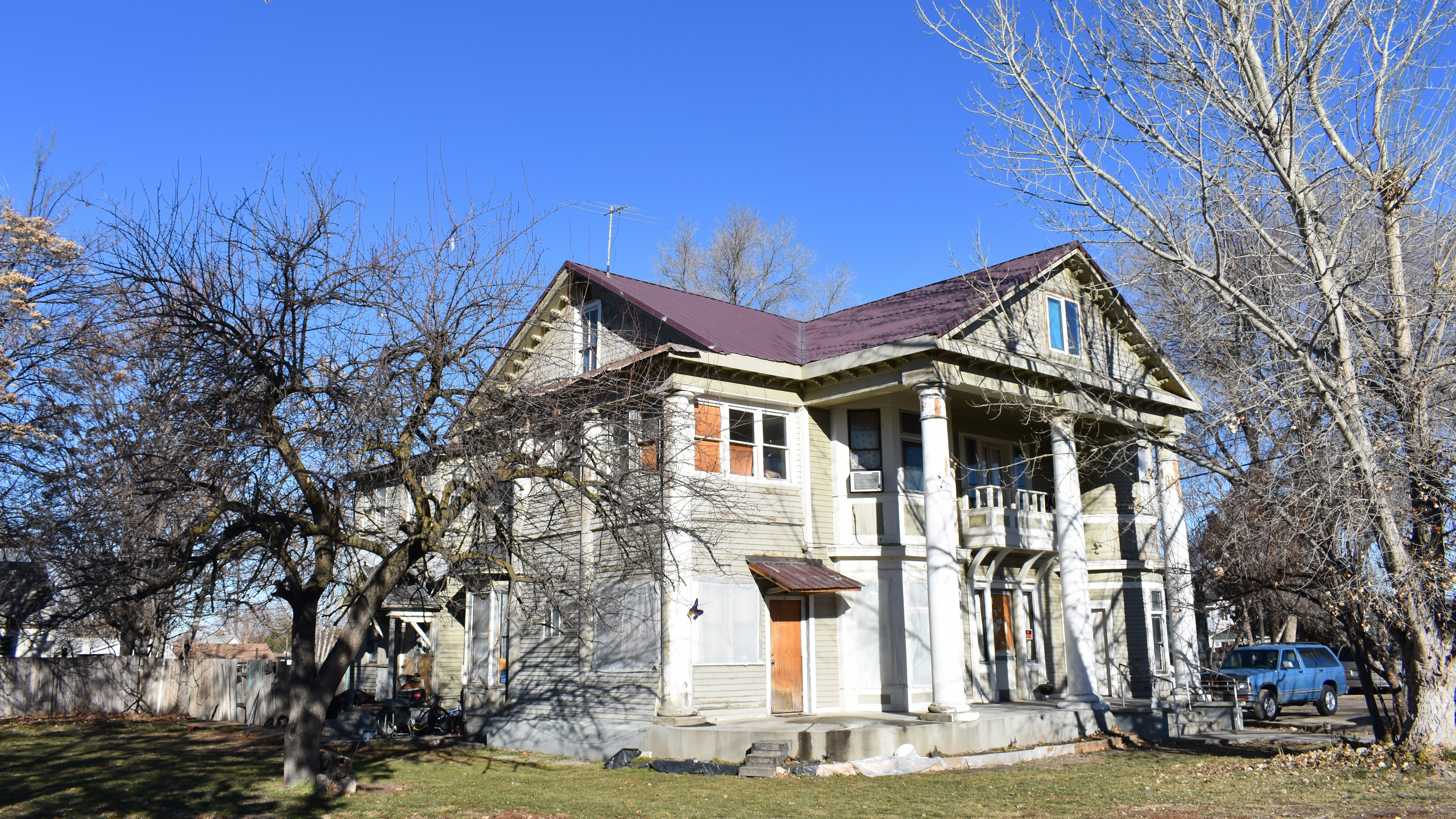
- The A.K. Steunenberg House in 2018

- Location within Idaho Location within the United States
- Location: 409 N. Kimball, Caldwell, Idaho
- Coordinates: 43°40′09″N 116°40′59″W
- Area: less than one acre
- Built: 1904
- Architect: Tourtellotte, John E. & Company
- Architectural style: Late 19th And Early 20th Century American Movements, Queen Anne, Colonial Revival
- MPS: Tourtellotte and Hummel Architecture TR
- NRHP reference No.: 82000335
- Added to NRHP: November 17, 1982

The A.K. Steunenberg House in Caldwell, Idaho, is a 2-story Colonial Revival expansion by Tourtellotte & Co. in 1904 of a smaller Queen Anne house. The 1904 renovation established a 2-story, round corner tower and a colonnade with three prominent columns marking the Kimball Street exposure. The original house at the northwest corner of North 4th and Kimball Streets may have been occupied by the Steunenbergs as early as 1890.

== Albert K. Steunenberg ==
The A.K. Steunenberg House was the property of Albert and Carrie Steunenberg, both of Iowa. Albert K. Steunenberg (September 11, 1863 – March 16, 1907) with his brother, Frank Steunenberg (August 8, 1861 – December 30, 1905), were publishers of The Caldwell Tribune from 1886 until 1893. Al Steunenberg was active in fraternal organizations and helped to found the Caldwell Commercial Bank, later the Caldwell Bank and Trust Co., serving as the bank's cashier.
