= Idaho Building =

Idaho Building may refer to:

- Idaho Building (Chicago World's Fair), at the 1893 exposition in Chicago, Illinois
- Idaho Building (Boise, Idaho), listed on the National Register of Historic Places (NRHP)
- Idaho Building (1904) at the 1904 Louisiana Purchase Exposition in St. Louis, Missouri
- Idaho Building (1905) at the 1905 Lewis and Clark Centennial Exposition in Portland, Oregon
