= Idaho Building (Boise, Idaho) =

- U.S. National Register of Historic Places
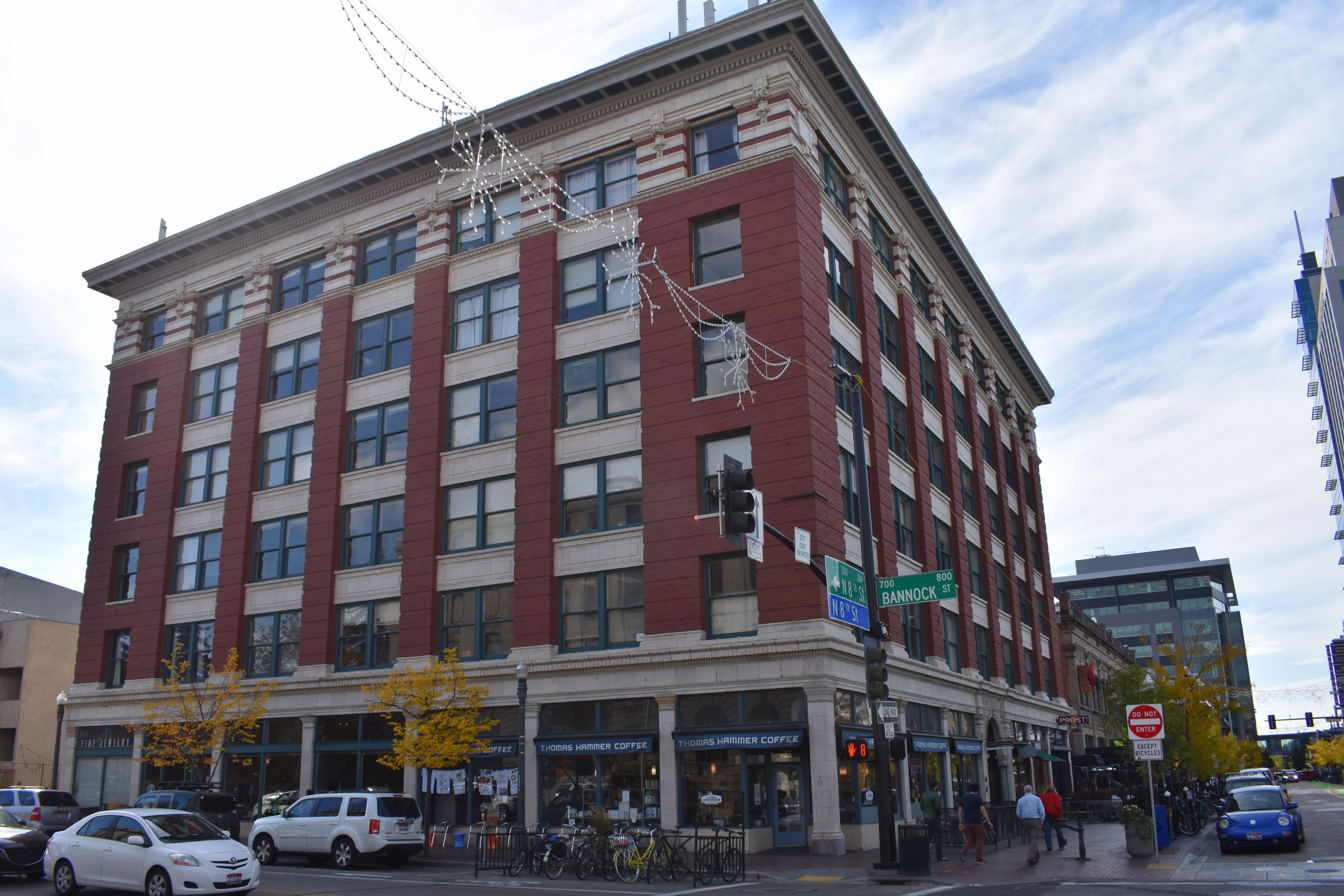
- The Idaho Building in 2018

- Location within Idaho Location within the United States
- Location: Bannock and 8th Sts., Boise, Idaho
- Coordinates: 43°37′01″N 116°12′03″W
- Area: less than one acre
- Built: 1910
- Built by: H. Ellenberger
- Architect: Tourtellotte & Co.
- Architectural style: Late 19th And 20th Century Revivals, Second Renaissance Revival
- NRHP reference No.: 78001033
- Added to NRHP: December 8, 1978

The Idaho Building in Boise, Idaho, is a 6-story, Second Renaissance Revival commercial structure designed by Chicago architect, Henry John Schlacks. (The National Register of Historic Places Inventory/Nomination Form lists Tourtellotte and Hummel as building designers, but "Tourtellotte may have been only a supervising architect...) Constructed for Boise City real estate developer Walter E. Pierce in 1910–11, the building represented local aspirations that Boise City would become another Chicago. The facade features brick pilasters above a ground floor stone base, separated by seven bays with large plate glass windows in each bay. Terracotta separates the floors, with ornamentation at the sixth floor below a denticulated cornice of galvanized iron.

The building replaced Thompson's Livery barn at 8th and Bannock Streets. The Chicago firm of H. Ellenberger was responsible for construction, and the Idaho Statesman said of the building in 1911, "The architectural scheme is one of extreme simplicity, and the builder has given his work the appearance of massive solidity."

The building was added to the National Register of Historic Places December 8, 1978.

== History ==
Early tenants of the building included W. E. Pierce & Co., Pierce-Hopper Insurance Agency, Boise Title & Trust Co., Senator William Borah, United States Forest Service, Joy Drug Store, Ada County Attorney, Wayland & Fennell, Margaret Giles beauty parlor, and the chairman of the local Republican Party. Later, the Democratic Central Committee leased offices in the building.

In 1969 the Idaho Building was considered for demolition along with other buildings in a 60-block area of Boise's historic core when a developer designed a large, outdoor shopping mall as part of a plan for urban renewal. In 1970 the outdoor mall plan was adjusted to spare the Idaho Building, but in 1976 the building was again slated for destruction. The mall was not constructed, however, and the Idaho Building was preserved.

The building was renovated to include residential space above the second floor in 2000, and space in the building was leased to a Boise hostel from 2010 until 2013.

== Other buildings named Idaho Building ==
The Idaho Building in Boise is not the only structure named "Idaho Building." In 1913 an Idaho Building opened in Meridian, Idaho. An Idaho Building represented the state of Idaho at the 1893 World's Columbian Exposition in Chicago; an Idaho Building won second place at the 1904 Louisiana Purchase Exposition in St. Louis; and an Idaho Building won a gold medal at the 1905 Lewis and Clark Centennial Exposition in Portland.

== See also ==
- Downtown Boise
