= Walter E. Pierce =

American politician and speculator

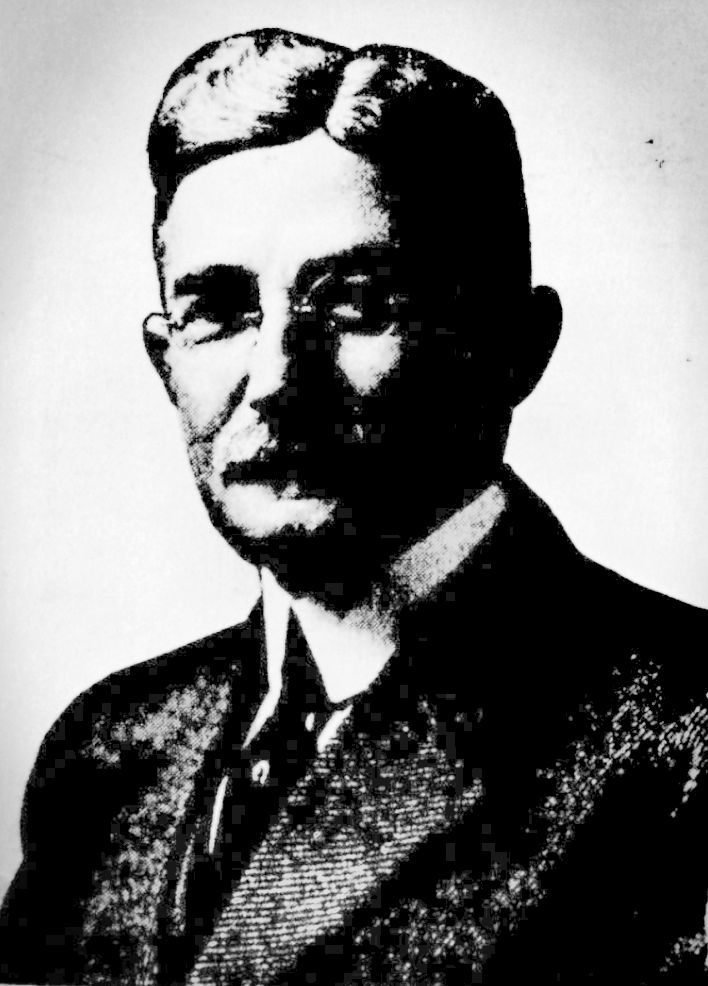
- Walter Pierce in the early 20th century

Mayor of Boise, Idaho
- In office July 11, 1895 – July 15, 1897
- Preceded by: Peter Sonna
- Succeeded by: Moses Alexander

Personal details
- Born: January 9, 1860 Waco, Texas
- Died: August 21, 1951 (aged 91) Boise, Idaho
- Party: Democratic
- Spouse: Georgianna Margaret Mundy
- Profession: Real estate developer

Walter E. Pierce (January 9, 1860 - August 21, 1951) was a prominent real estate speculator in Boise City, Idaho, USA, in the late 19th century and in the first half of the 20th century. Pierce served as mayor of Boise City 1895-97 as it evolved from being a frontier community to being a modern town.

== Early life ==
Walter E. Pierce was born January 9, 1860, in Waco, Texas, to parents Charles and Elizabeth (Harding) Pierce, from Providence, Rhode Island. The Pierce family had moved from Providence in 1854 and settled in Bell County, Texas, where Charles Pierce operated a sheep ranch. After Walter was born the family moved to Baxter Springs, Kansas, and Charles died there in 1860, leaving six children. After the death of her husband, Elizabeth Pierce moved the family to Vicksburg, Mississippi, but after seven years the family returned to Kansas. Later, Walter attended business college.

In 1882 Pierce had become proprietor of the Arcade Hotel in Rich Hill, Missouri, and he remained at the hotel at least until May, 1883.

Pierce married Georgianna Margaret Mundy at the Palace Hotel in Butler, Missouri, on February 1, 1882.

== Career ==
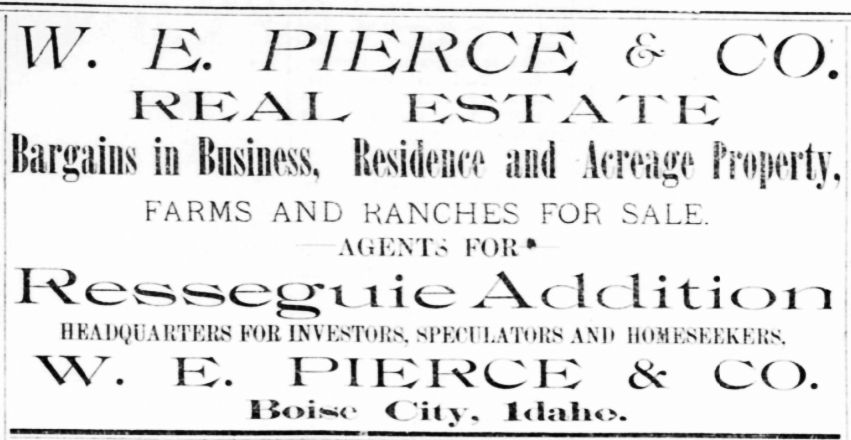
Advertisement for W. E. Pierce & Co. in 1891

Soon after Idaho Territory became a state in 1890, the Pierces moved in September from Richfield, Kansas, to Boise City. By October of that year, along with partners John M. Haines and L. H. Cox, he had founded W. E. Pierce & Co., a real estate and abstract company originally located at 820 Main Street, across from the Lemp Block. W. E. Pierce & Co. were exclusive agents for the Resseguie Addition, the Hyde Park Addition, the Lemp Addition, Lemp's East Side Addition, the DeLamar Addition, the Bryon Addition, and others. The company also planted trees in areas under development.

For the Chicago World's Fair in 1893, Pierce & Co. produced 5000 copies of a pamphlet, Boise the Beautiful, to be distributed from the fair's Idaho Building. Then in 1895 the pamphlet was again distributed to attract settlers from Eastern states and capital from Eastern banking interests.

Pierce was nominated for mayor of Boise City in 1895, a position he had not sought and one which his friends mistakenly believed he would decline. A Democrat, Pierce won the election and served one term as mayor 1895-97. During his tenure, Boise City collected road taxes, installed paved streets, cement sidewalks, and regulated electric lines, telephone poles, and hydrants. The city also enacted ordinances prohibiting prostitution and promoting orderly conduct on city streets.

In 1905 Pierce organized the Boise & Interurban Railroad, a 60-mile electric streetcar loop from Boise to Caldwell. One stop on the streetcar loop was Pierce Park, constructed in 1907 four miles from Boise. Inspired by Oaks Amusement Park in Portland, the trolley park was a popular destination during the era of streetcars.

In 1910 Pierce opened Boise's new Idaho Building, a skyscraper of which the Idaho Statesman wrote: "Six stories in height, it towers above its neighbors like a mountain peak."

When the Hotel Boise (Hoff Building) was constructed in 1930, Pierce was president and major stockholder. The building is listed with the National Register of Historic Places as a contributing resource in the Boise Capitol Area District.

In addition to holding other offices, Pierce served as a director of the Artesian Hot and Cold Water Company, as president of the Boise Natatorium, as president of the Allen-Wright Furniture Co., as president of the Farmer's Bank of Star, and as president of the Boise Chamber of Commerce.

Pierce constructed a series of homes in Boise for his family. The Walter E. Pierce House (1914), designed by Wayland & Fennell, was purchased by the State of Idaho in 1947 and served as the official governor's mansion from 1947 to 1990.

== Death ==
Walter E. Pierce died August 21, 1951, in Boise.

== See also ==
- Pierce–Borah House
- Pierce Park School

Political offices
Preceded by Peter Sonna	Mayor of Boise; 1895–1897	Succeeded by Moses Alexander
