= Inez Asher =

Novelist and television writer (1911–2006)

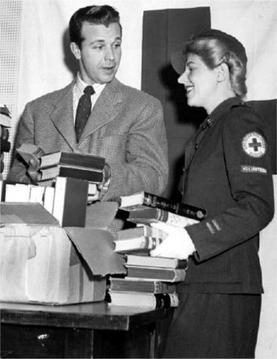
- Dick Powell, Inez Asher
- Born: Inez Harriett Silverberg; January 1, 1911; Des Moines, Iowa, US
- Died: May 8, 2006 (aged 95); Yonkers, New York, US
- Other name: Inez Hirsch
- Occupations: Television writer, novelist
- Spouses: Alvin Asher (m. 1933; died 1967) James M. Hirsch (m. 1982)
- Children: 1

Inez Asher (née Inez Harriett Silverberg; January 1, 1911 – May 8, 2006) was an American novelist and television writer.

== Early years ==
Inez Asher was the only child of Minor Silverberg, a Des Moines, Iowa real estate agent, and Edna Harris Silverberg. When Asher was six years old, General Frederick Funston was holding her in his arms as he collapsed and died from a heart attack in the lobby of The St. Anthony Hotel in San Antonio, Texas. Asher was a member of the class of 1928, Theodore Roosevelt High School, attended Miss Orton's Classical School for Girls and UCLA; she was elected to Phi Beta Kappa in her junior year.

== Radio and television writer ==
Asher co-wrote the episode "Robert E. Lee" for the Famous Children of History radio program. With Emilie Roberts, Asher composed a short lecture, "Irene Talking." Asher wrote "The Last Orchid", the first episode of the Philco Players television program (1948). Asher wrote for the 1954 televised series of Lassie. and co-wrote "Welcome to Washington," an unsold television pilot for the proposed series The Claudette Colbert Show which aired as an episode of the anthology series Colgate Theatre in 1958.

== Political ==
Like many Hollywood writers of the 1930s, Asher was singled out for her left-wing views. In 1934 she was listed in Elizabeth Dilling's self-published The red network; a "who's who" and handbook of radicalism for patriots.

== Novelist and poet ==
Asher published one novel, Family Sins (Pinnacle Books, New York 1983), the story of an American widow who travels to the Orient in pursuit of a Korean orphan and ends up in the arms of a handsome but married Japanese doctor. Asher was co-author (with illustrator Alice Rovinsky) of two illustrated books of verse: Look at Me! A See Yourself Book for Boys and Look at Me! A See Yourself Book for Girls (Garden City Books, Garden City, New York 1951). Parents would paste a child's photo in the designated spot inside the back cover and as the child turned the pages he would see his face, through a hole cut in each page, in all the people he wanted to be: pilot, railroad conductor, etc. "Look at me, and you will see, all the things I'd like to be. If I were a fireman brave, Folks in danger I would save!" or "To be a cowboy, Bronco Bill, That would give me such a thrill!" Publishers Weekly called the books "A delightful novelty."

== Personal ==
Asher was married to Alvin Asher, an attorney for MGM, and to James Marvin Hirsch.

== Later years ==
Asher worked as a coordinator in the International Student Center at the University of California, Los Angeles. She died in Yonkers, New York.
