= Dr. Frank R. Burroughs House =

Historic house in Washington, United States

- U.S. National Register of Historic Places
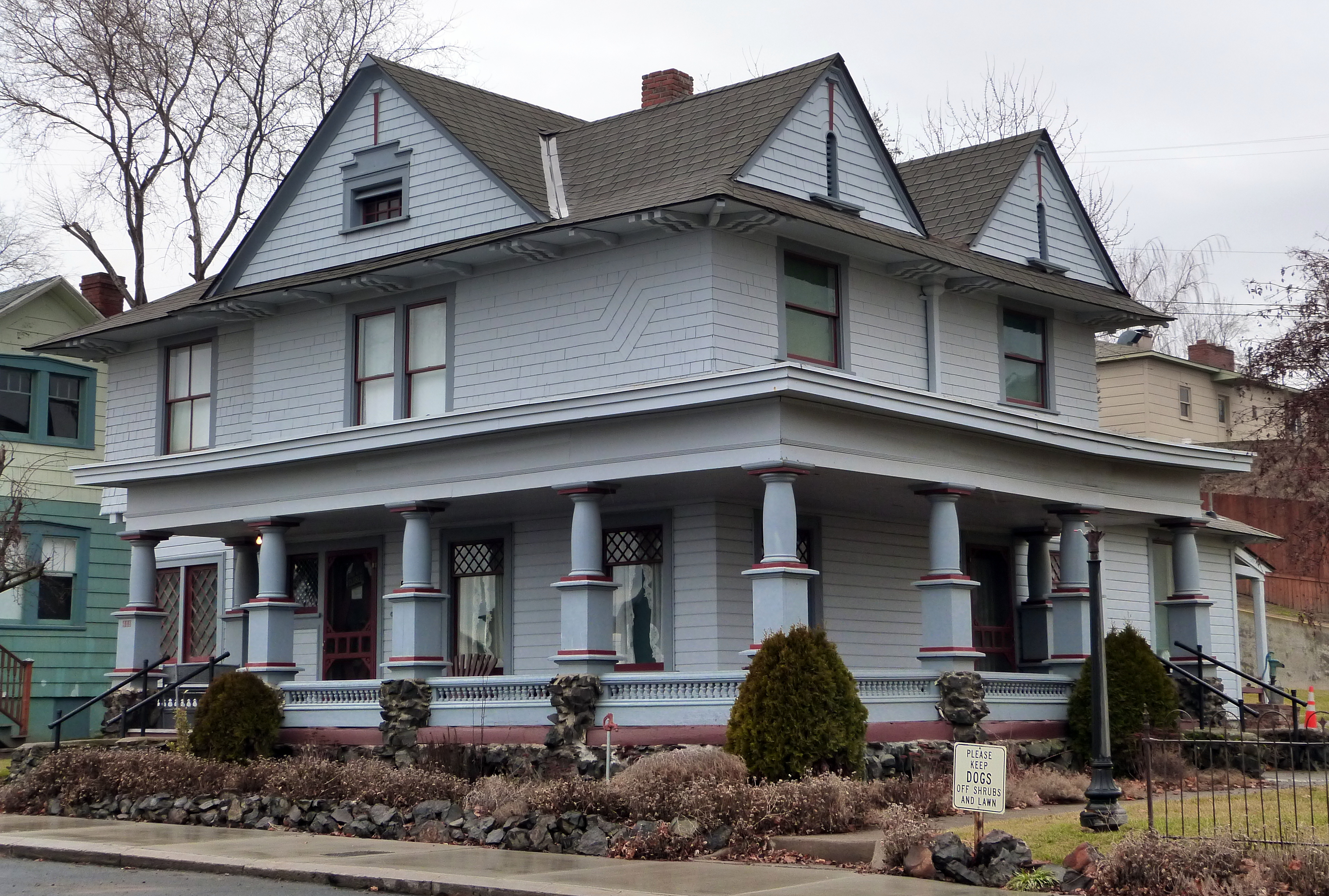
- The Burroughs House in 2015

- Location within Washington (state) Location within the United States
- Interactive map showing the location of Dr. Frank R. Burroughs House
- Location: 408 West Main Avenue, Ritzville, Washington
- Coordinates: 47°07′31″N 118°22′59″W
- Area: less than one acre
- Built: 1890
- Architect: J. Flood Walker
- NRHP reference No.: 75001838
- Added to NRHP: November 20, 1975

The Dr. Frank R. Burroughs House, located in Ritzville, Washington, United States, is a house listed on the National Register of Historic Places. The house, now hosting the Frank R. Burroughs Home Museum, is owned by the city and open for tours.

== See also ==
- National Register of Historic Places listings in Washington
