= James Flood Walker =

American architect

- Born: 1868
- Died: February 24, 1924 (aged 55–56); Santa Barbara, California
- Other names: J. Flood Walker
- Occupation: Architect
- Buildings: The St. Anthony Hotel

James Flood Walker (1868-February 24, 1924) was an architect in the United States who worked in Los Angeles, Seattle, Boise, and San Antonio. Some of Walker's work is listed on the National Register of Historic Places, including the Dr. Frank R. Burroughs House and the St. Anthony Hotel. Other buildings designed by Walker are part of National Register historic districts, including the West End Theatre and the Lawrence Building listed in the Downtown Santa Ana Historic Districts. And Walker designed the John T. Morrison House, listed in the State Street Historic District in Boise.

== Career ==
Walker began his career in Los Angeles, working for Robert Brown Young. Later he located in Seattle and formed a partnership with Edward C. McManus. While in Boise, Walker designed the Idaho Building for the 1904 Louisiana Purchase Exposition in St. Louis. After the Exposition, Walker moved to San Antonio, and he later returned to California.

== Death ==
Walker died in Santa Barbara in 1924.

== Oro Vista Mining and Milling Company ==
In 1896 Walker became a director and minor shareholder in the Oro Vista Mining and Milling Co. of California. By 1905, the company charter had been forfeited for nonpayment of business taxes.

If an association existed between James Flood Walker and Comstock Lode miner James Clair Flood, it has not been established.

== Works ==
=== Ritzville, Washington ===
- Dr. Frank R. Burroughs House (1890)

=== Seattle ===
- M.F. Backus Apartment Building (1901)
- M.S. Boothe House (1902)
- Cyrus F. Clapp Building (1902)
- H.E. Daniels House (1902)
- George W. Dilling House (1902)
- Carrie B. Friend Apartment Building (1902)
- W.K. Green Houses (1902)
- Rosa Lobe Apartment Building (1901)
- W.D. Perkins House (1902)

=== St. Louis, Missouri ===
- Idaho Building (1904)

=== St. Anthony, Idaho ===
- Juvenile Correctional Center (1904)

=== Twin Falls ===
- Hotel Perrine (1905)

=== Boise ===
- John T. Morrison House (1905)
- "State Street House" 2124 W. State St. (Boise, Idaho) (Home of Benjamin Anders & John Parsons (1924)

=== San Antonio, Texas ===
- St. Anthony Hotel (1909)

=== Pasadena, California ===
- Mission Court

=== Santa Ana ===
- West End Theatre (1915)
- Lawrence Building (1915)
