= Miss Orton's Classical School for Girls =

- Miss Orton's Classical School for Girls (Dormitory)
- U.S. National Register of Historic Places
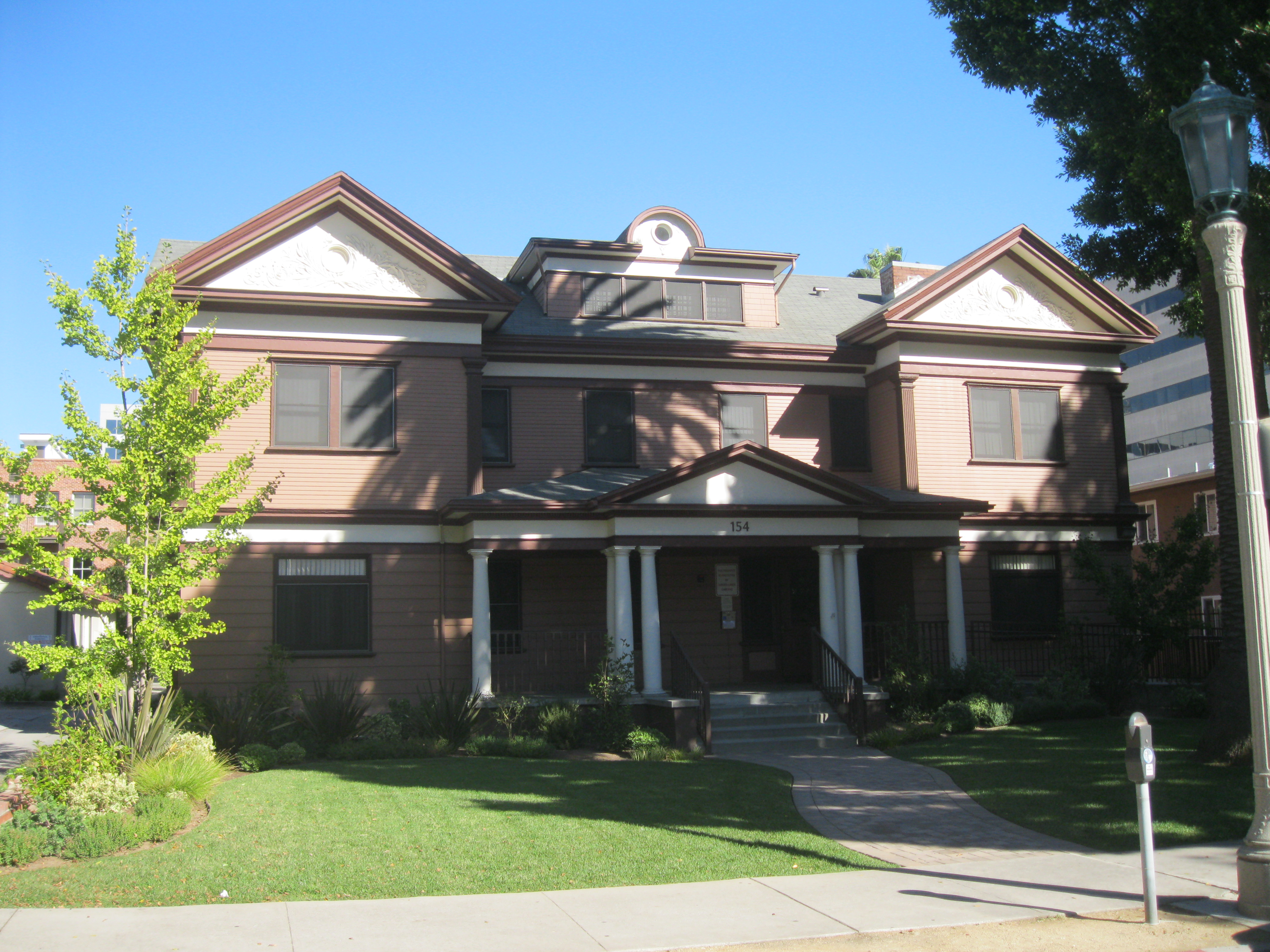
- The school's dormitory building

- Location within the Los Angeles metropolitan area Location within California Location within the United States
- Location: 154 S. Euclid Ave., Pasadena, California
- Coordinates: 34°8′36″N 118°8′33″W
- Area: 0.3 acres (0.12 ha)
- Built: 1900
- Built by: Daniels & Perry
- Architect: Frederick Roehrig
- Architectural style: Colonial Revival
- NRHP reference No.: 95000998
- Added to NRHP: August 4, 1995

Miss Orton's Classical School for Girls was a private girls' school in Pasadena, California. The school, which was run by educator Anna Orton, opened in 1890. The school was designed to prepare girls for a higher education at a college in the Eastern United States, as most secondary schools in Pasadena at the time assumed their students would go to Stanford or Berkeley if they desired further education.

== Curriculum ==
The school's college preparatory curriculum reflected a national shift in women's educational opportunities; until the late nineteenth century, girls' schools were mainly finishing schools or arts schools and were not academically equivalent to men's schools. Miss Orton's School was the first non-religious private girls' school in Pasadena, as well as the only such school in the city until 1913, making Orton a pioneer of women's education in Pasadena. The school closed in 1930.

== Brief history ==
The first building at the school, which housed a single classroom, was constructed in 1892. A gymnasium was built at a later point, and a dormitory was constructed in 1900. A bungalow which served as Miss Orton's home was built in 1908. The buildings were designed by Frederick Roehrig in the Victorian Colonial Revival style; they were probably the only educational buildings designed by Roehrig, a significant Southern California architect. The classroom and gymnasium burned down between 1910 and 1925 and were replaced by a social hall. The dormitory is now the only building remaining at its original location; while the bungalow is also still at the site of the school, it was moved to a new foundation in 1947. The dormitory was added to the National Register of Historic Places on August 4, 1995.

== Notable Alumnae ==
- Inez Asher, novelist and television writer
