= Pierce–Borah House =

Historic house in Idaho, United States

- U.S. National Register of Historic Places
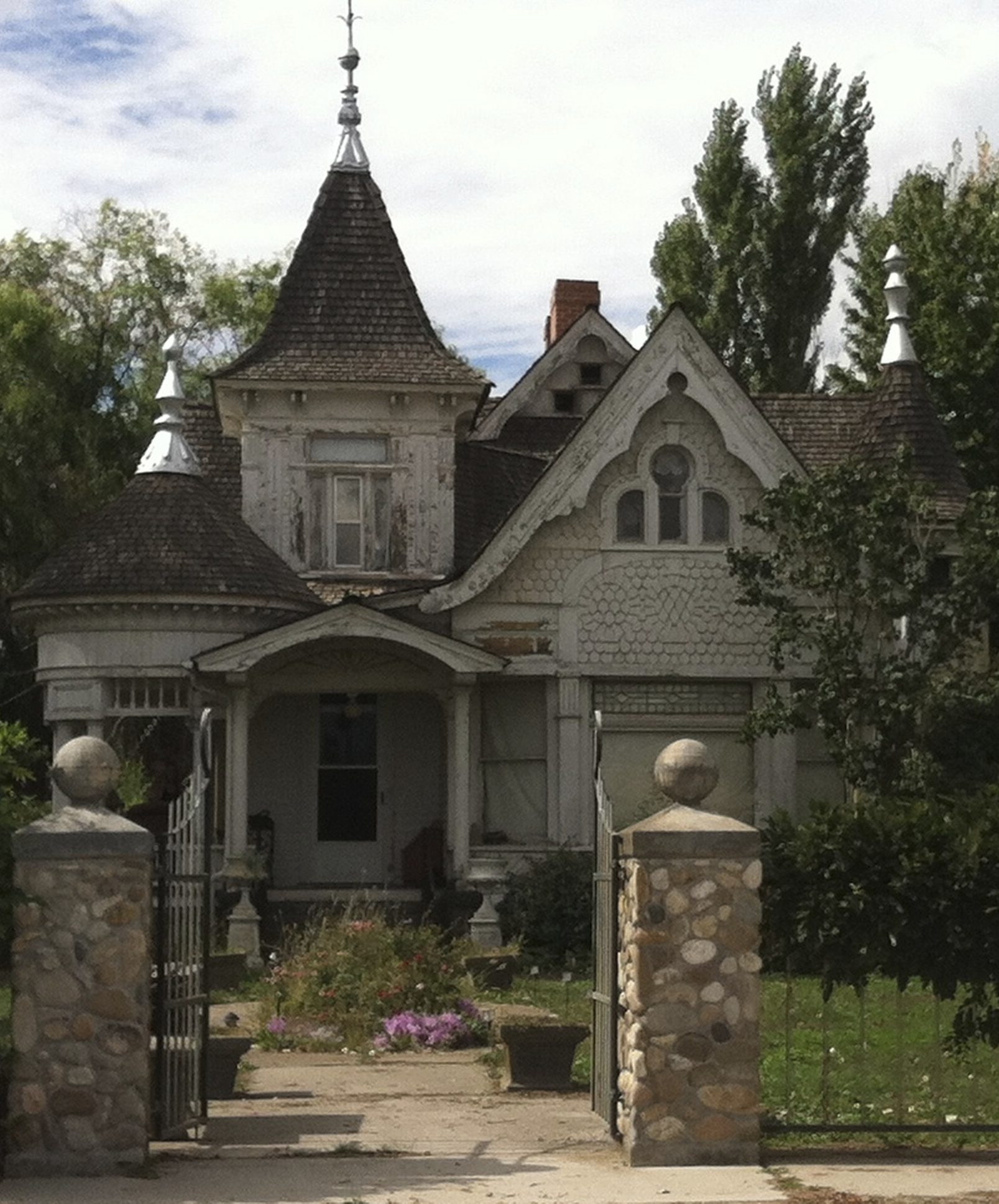
- The Pierce–Borah House in 2013

- Location within Idaho Location within the United States
- Location: 5801 Branstetter Street, Garden City, Idaho
- Coordinates: 43°39′32″N 116°18′14″W
- Built: 1897
- Architect: John E. Tourtellotte
- Architectural style: Gothic/Queen Anne
- NRHP reference No.: 83000257
- Added to NRHP: January 3, 1983

The Pierce–Borah House is a historic building just outside of Garden City, Idaho. Listed on the National Register of Historic Places, the house was among the earliest designed by prominent Idaho architect John E. Tourtellotte. It was completed in 1897 and originally located at 11th and Franklin Streets, in nearby Boise.

The house was commissioned by Boise entrepreneur Walter E. Pierce but was sold in 1898 to William Borah, later a prominent United States Senator. Pierce had sold another of his houses to Borah in 1893. In 1959, the house was purchased by Vernon K. Smith and moved from its original location to the present site, in what was then a rural area west of Garden City.

Although the house was described as being in "excellent condition" in a 1982 report, it appears to have since fallen into disrepair.
