= The St. Anthony Hotel =

- Saint Anthony Hotel
- U.S. National Register of Historic Places
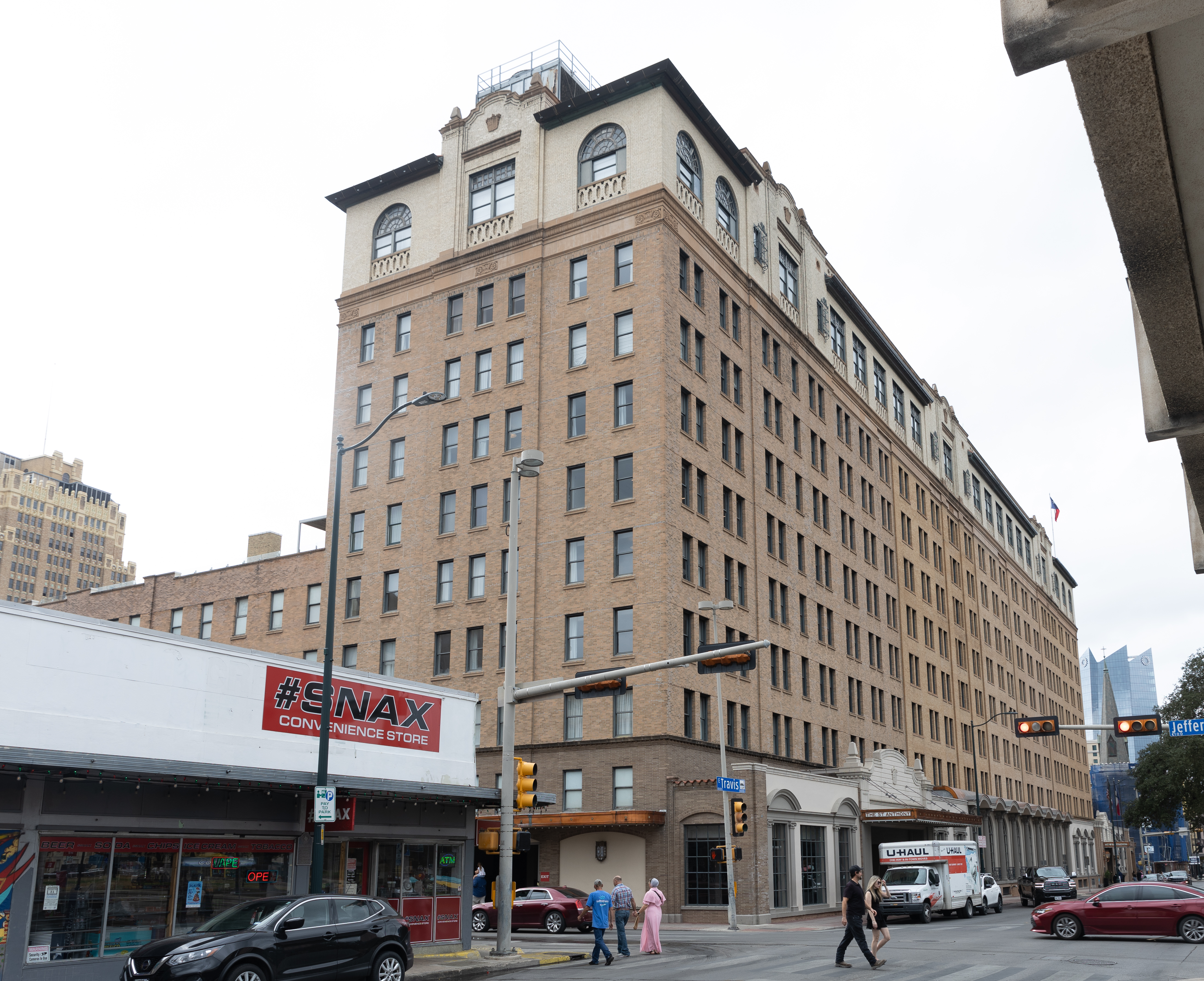
- The St Anthony

- Location within Texas Location within the United States
- Location: 300 Travis St. San Antonio, Texas; United States
- Coordinates: 29°25′38″N 98°29′19″W
- Area: less than one acre
- Built: 1909
- Architect: James Flood Walker
- NRHP reference No.: 86002186
- Added to NRHP: September 20, 1986

The St. Anthony, a Luxury Collection Hotel, San Antonio is a historic 10-story hotel in downtown San Antonio, Texas, USA. Built in 1909, it was considered one of the most luxurious hotels in the United States and hosted a wide range of film stars, royalty, and other famous guests. It is listed on the National Register of Historic Places.

== History ==
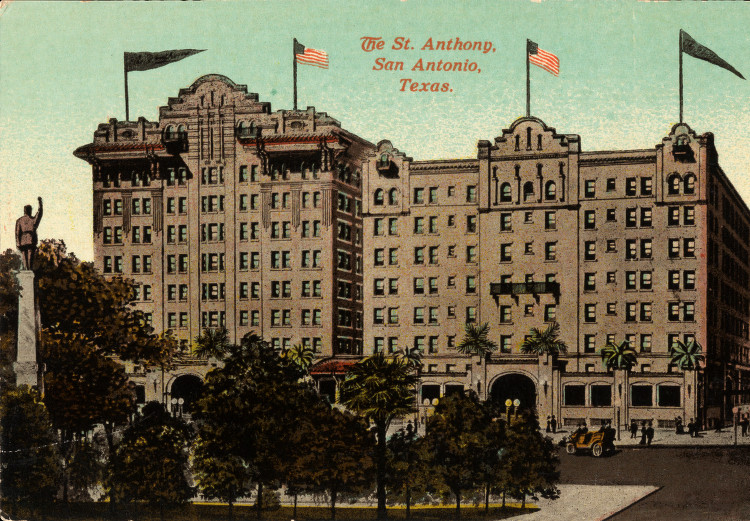
The St. Anthony Hotel, 1913. Original 1909 wing right, 1910 addition left

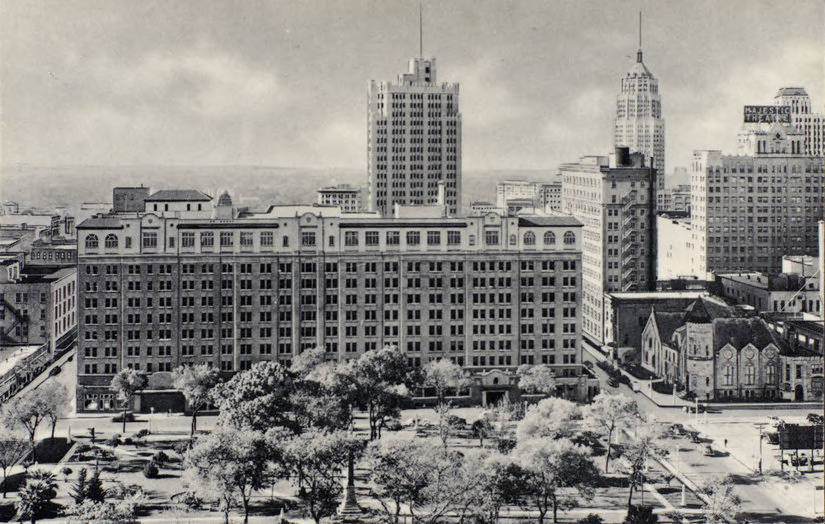
The St. Anthony Hotel, 1941, after the third wing was added

The St. Anthony Hotel was constructed by cattlemen B. L. Naylor and Augustus H. Jones. The men believed that San Antonio was destined to become an important tourist destination and that a luxury hotel would bring an influx of wealthy people coming to the city. it was designed by architect James Flood Walker and opened in 1909, with 210 rooms.

The St. Anthony was the first luxury hotel in the city. All the rooms had mahogany moldings and furnishings and telephones, Half of the rooms had private baths. It also featured doors which opened automatically, and electric lights that turned off when the patron locked their hotel room door. It was so technologically advanced that it was considered among the world's most modern hotels.

The St. Anthony proved so popular that the owners had Walker design a 220-room addition, which opened in January 1910. Jones died in the hotel's lobby in 1913, while serving as the mayor of San Antonio.

The hotel was sold to W.N. Robinson of Kansas City, Missouri in 1924. The cast and crew of the Best Picture Oscar-winning film Wings, including Clara Bow and Gary Cooper, stayed at the hotel throughout late 1926 and early 1927, during the movie's lengthy shoot at nearby Kelly Field.

In the depths of the Great Depression, the hotel fell on difficult times. It began to deteriorate, and the banks foreclosed on the owners. Ralph W. Morrison, civic leader and rancher, purchased the hotel in 1935 for $475,000. He renovated the hotel, adding two stories on top and redesigning the facade, so the 1909 and 1910 wings matched. The new top floor contained a ballroom, the Rainbow Terrace. The hotel also added air conditioning, becoming the first fully-functioning air-conditioned hotel in the world. Morrison purchased an extensive art collection to hang in the public spaces, and oriental carpets and French Empire furnishings for the public lounges.

In 1940, Morrison hired architect John W. Marriott to add a third wing to the hotel, filling the remainder of the city block facing Travis Park. The new wing also added an innovative motor lobby, with a drive-thru registration desk and gas station for automobile travelers. Morrison died in 1948, and ownership passed to his trust. In 1959, internationally-famed designer Dorothy Draper was hired to redecorate the hotel's interiors. She also created the St. Anthony Club, a restaurant that became well known for its excellent food. John Wayne stayed at the hotel in 1960, while attending the nearby premiere of his epic film The Alamo.

San Antonio financier William Ocshe bought the hotel from the Morrison trust in 1971. In April 1981, Ochse sold the hotel to Inter-Continental Hotels, which renamed it the St. Anthony Inter-Continental San Antonio. The hotel was renovated from 1982-1983, at a cost of $27 million.

In 1988, the hotel was sold to Fu Investments of San Francisco and became The St. Anthony again, managed by Park Lane Hotels. In March 1996, Park Lane contracted with Crowne Plaza Hotels to manage the property, and it became the Crowne Plaza St. Anthony Hotel.

In January 1998, American Property Management Inc. of Albuquerque, New Mexico bought the hotel. They contracted with Wyndham Hotels to franchise the property, which became The St. Anthony - Wyndham Grand Heritage Hotel in November 1998. In 2001, the hotel was sold to New York-based Apollo Investments and Prescott Realty Group. Wyndham assumed direct management of the hotel in October 2001, and it became The St. Anthony - A Wyndham Historic Hotel. In 2011, the hotel was renamed The St. Anthony Riverwalk Wyndham Hotel. The hotel was extensively renovated from 2012-2015. It left Wyndham in 2014 and became The St. Anthony Hotel again.

On November 19, 2015, the hotel celebrated its grand reopening, managed by The Luxury Collection division of Marriott International as The St. Anthony, a Luxury Collection Hotel, San Antonio.

== In Popular Culture ==
Portions of the 1998 Richard Linklater film "The Newton Boys" were filmed in and around the hotel.

== Famous guests ==
The St. Anthony Hotel has hosted a number of famous people. These include President Franklin D. Roosevelt, President Dwight D. Eisenhower, General Douglas MacArthur, Vice President John Nance Garner, and humorist Will Rogers. Lyndon B. Johnson spent his honeymoon there. The Newton Gang often resided there in the winter. The hotel was also home to the cast of the first film to win the Academy Award for Best Picture, Wings. Stars of the film that stayed at the hotel included Richard Arlen, Charles "Buddy" Rogers and Clara Bow.

In 2012, the hotel hosted the Arena Football University. At this event, arena football teams meet with vendors and league officials to discuss the upcoming season.

== Famous deaths ==
Samuel Gompers, president of the American Federation of Labor, died in the hotel on December 13, 1924.

Texas politician Robert L. Bobbitt lived in the St. Anthony for the last year of his life prior to his death in 1972.

In the moments leading up to his death, Major General Frederick Funston, who President Woodrow Wilson favored as leader of the American Expeditionary Force in the First World War, was relaxing in the lobby of the hotel listening to The Blue Danube Waltz. After commenting, "How beautiful it all is," he collapsed from a massive painful heart attack (myocardial infarction) and died on February 19, 1917. He was holding six-year old Inez Harriet Silverberg in his arms. Wilson was forced to choose General John Pershing as a replacement.

== Bibliography ==
- Baker, T. Lindsay (2011). Gangster Tour of Texas (1st ed.). College Station: Texas A & M University Press. ISBN 978-1-60344-407-1. OCLC 747411368.
- Carmack, Liz (2007). Historic Hotels of Texas: A Traveler's Guide (1st ed.). College Station: Texas A&M University Press. ISBN 978-1-58544-608-7. OCLC 80360835.
- Moehring, Sharon Anne Dobyns; Moehring, John A. (2003). The Gonzales Connection: The History and Genealogy of the DeWitt and Jones Families. John A. Moehring. Victoria, BC: Trafford Pub. ISBN 1-4120-1788-2. OCLC 54544457.
- Ruff, Ann (1985). A Guide to Historic Texas Inns and Hotels (2nd ed.). Houston, Tex.: Lone Star Books. ISBN 0-88415-385-1. OCLC 11917159.
- Woods, Randall Bennett (2007). LBJ: Architect of American Ambition (1st paperback ed.). Cambridge, MA: Harvard University Press. ISBN 978-0-674-02699-5. OCLC 165408359.

Preceded by Unknown	Tallest Building in San Antonio; 1909—1919; 41m	Succeeded by South Texas Building
