= Pierce Park School =

Historic building in Idaho, USA

- U.S. National Register of Historic Places
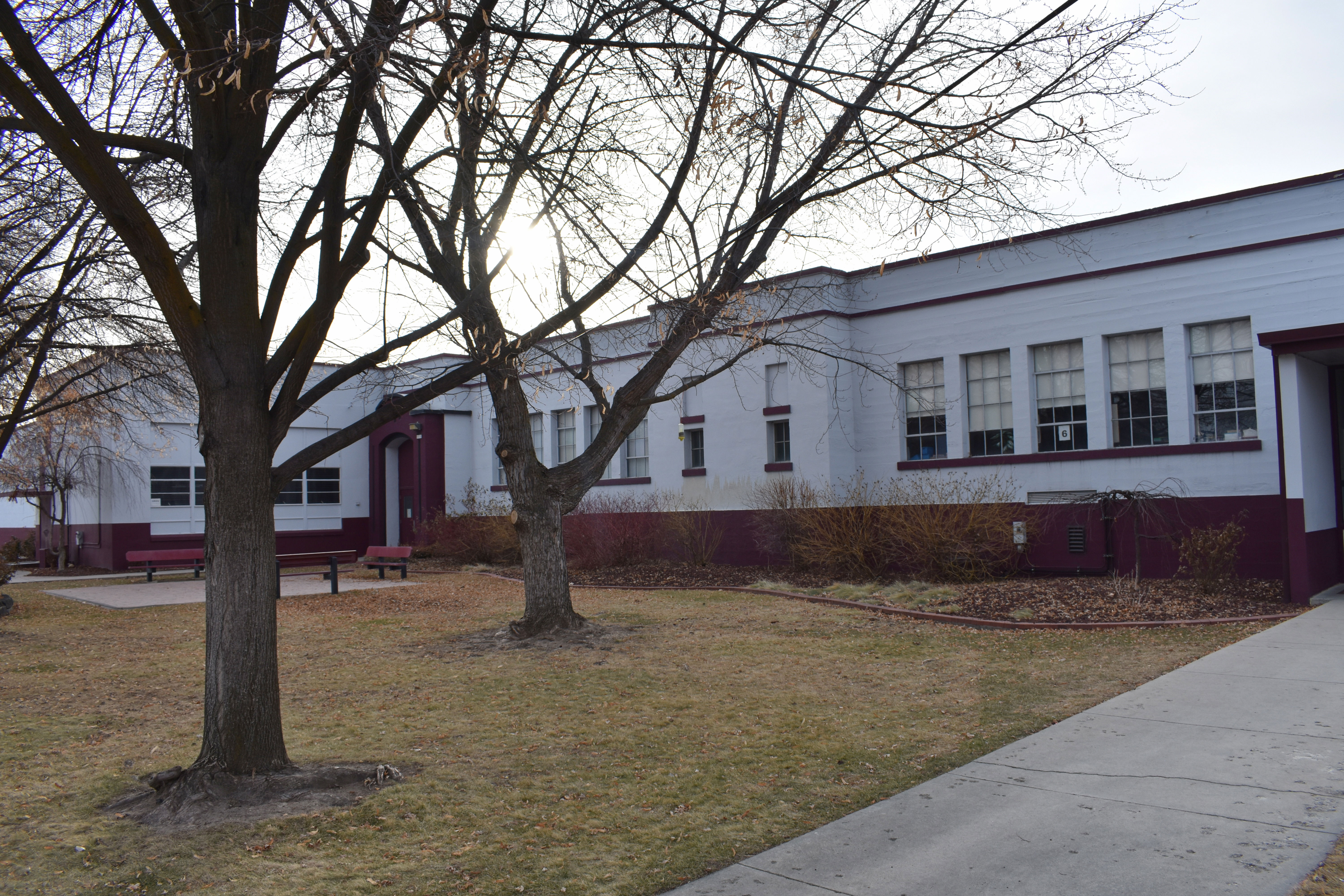
- Pierce Park School in 2019

- Location within Idaho Location within the United States
- Location: 5015 Pierce Park Lane, Boise, Idaho
- Coordinates: 43°39′58″N 116°16′06″W
- Area: 8.4 acres (3.4 ha)
- Built: 1911
- MPS: Boise Public Schools TR
- NRHP reference No.: 82000233
- Added to NRHP: November 8, 1982

Pierce Park School in Boise, Idaho, is a 1 1/2-story, flat roof, brick and stucco building constructed in 1911 as a 4-room schoolhouse. The building has expanded with its growing community, but the additions have been considered compatible with the original structure, and the school was added to the National Register of Historic Places in 1982.

The school was named for Pierce Park, a trolley park developed by Walter E. Pierce in 1907, four miles from Boise and along the route of the Boise & Interurban Railway. The park closed in 1928.
