= Idaho Building (1904) =

Historic building formerly in St. Louis Missouri

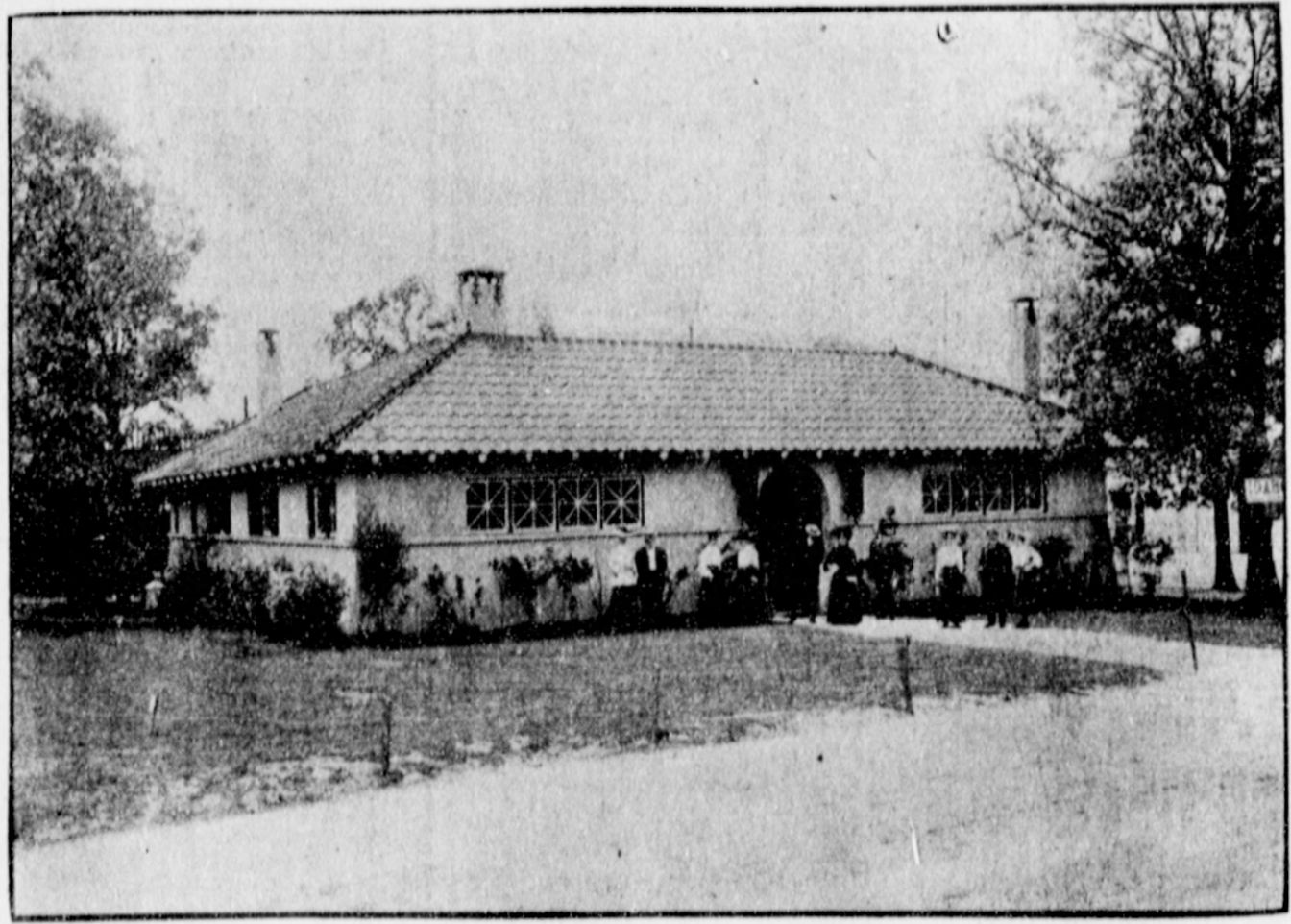
- The Idaho Building in 1904

General information
- Type: Exposition hall
- Architectural style: Hacienda
- Location: St. Louis, Missouri; San Antonio, Texas
- Construction started: May 14, 1904
- Construction stopped: December 1, 1904

Design and construction
- Architect: J. Flood Walker

Other information
- Number of rooms: 10

The Idaho Building at the Louisiana Purchase Exhibition in St. Louis, Missouri, in 1904 was a 1-story hacienda designed by architect J. Flood Walker. The building was smallest among the state building exhibits, yet it made a lasting impression on fairgoers. The architect received over 300 requests for architectural drawings of the building in 1904, and the St. Louis Globe-Democrat said of the building, "This is the ideal ranch house that the St. Louis exposition has created, and if remembered for nothing else by western people, the world's fair will always be recalled by the constantly growing number of houses constructed after the fashion of Idaho's pretty building."

== Architecture ==
The exterior of the 1-story building was 60 feet square with minimal decoration, cream colored walls, with windows six feet above ground. The roof was red clay tile. Inside the building, ten rooms surrounded a small courtyard and fountain. Interior rooms featured paneling and open beam ceilings of wood from Idaho's forests.

Transparency photographs of Idaho scenery hung inside the windows, and Native American artifacts were displayed.

A writer for the Omaha Daily Bee said that "Idaho's building is a cosy bungalow, with a great smoking room that has polished floors, bearskin rugs and other signs of elegant comfort."

== Prizes ==
The Idaho Building took second place among all state buildings exhibited at the fair.

During the exhibition, Idaho received the grand prize for grains and agricultural products. Idaho also received 17 gold medals, 14 silver medals, and 22 bronze medals awarded to agricultural exhibitors. Idaho's fruit exhibit received the gold medal, and fruit exhibitors received 3 gold medals, 28 silver medals, and 26 bronze medals. Idaho's mineral exhibit received the gold medal, and mining and mineral exhibitors received one gold medal and eight silver medals.

== Governor and Mrs. Morrison ==
Idaho governor John T. Morrison and his wife, Grace (Mackey) Morrison, attended the opening of the Idaho Building on May 14, 1904, and Mrs. Morrison served afternoon tea at the building, returning daily until the end of May.

In 1905, Idaho Building architect J. Flood Walker designed the John T. Morrison House, located in Boise's State Street Historic District. The Morrison House is a chalet design, smaller yet similar to a former Idaho Building at the 1893 World's Columbian Exposition in Chicago.

In September, 1904, the Idaho Building was purchased by J.C. Adams who later moved it on rail cars to San Antonio, Texas, where the building eventually became two adjacent houses.

== See also ==
- Idaho Building at the 1893 World's Columbian Exposition in Chicago
- Idaho Building at the 1905 Lewis and Clark Centennial Exposition in Portland
