= State Street Historic District (Boise, Idaho) =

Historic NRHP district in Idaho, United States

- U.S. National Register of Historic Places
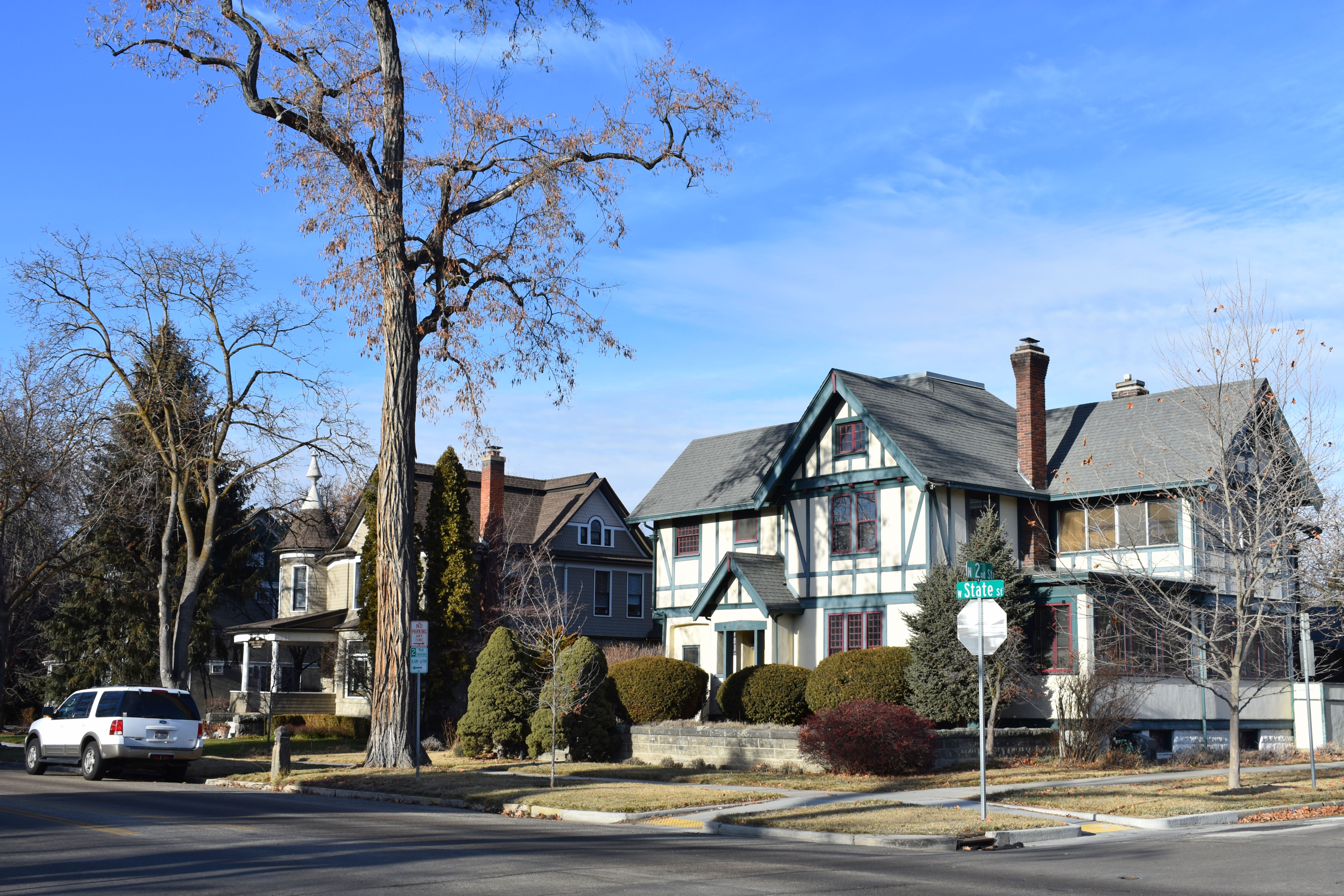
- The State Street Historic District in 2019

- Location within Idaho Location within the United States
- Location: Jefferson, 2nd and 3rd Sts., Boise, Idaho
- Area: 5.1 acres (2.1 ha)
- Architect: Multiple
- Architectural style: Colonial Revival, Queen Anne, Palladian
- NRHP reference No.: 78001036
- Added to NRHP: December 15, 1978

The State Street Historic District in Boise, Idaho, is a group of houses constructed between 1886 and 1940 along West Jefferson and State Streets, bounded by North 2nd and 3rd Streets. The houses represent a variety of architectural styles, and some were occupied by politicians and judges during the early 20th century. The historic district was added to the National Register of Historic Places in 1978.

== Inventory ==
- Frank Dietrich House (1910), 203 W Jefferson St, is a 2 1/2-story Palladian or Colonial Revival design by Tourtellotte and Hummel. Frank Sigel Dietrich was a federal judge appointed by President Theodore Roosevelt in 1907 to fill a seat on the U.S. District Court in Idaho. In 1926 President Calvin Coolidge appointed Dietrich to serve on the Ninth Circuit Court of Appeals.
- Samuel L. Tipton House (1903), 211 W Jefferson St, is a 2-story Queen Anne design by Tourtellotte & Co. Samuel L. Tipton was an assistant U.S. Attorney and city attorney in Boise.
- Richard C. Adelman House (1884), 221 W Jefferson St, relocated to Julia Davis Park. The 1-story Adelman House had been one of the oldest houses in Boise to remain at its original site, and then in 1981 it moved. Richard C. Adelman was a miner and saloonkeeper who arrived in Boise in the 1870s.
- John W. Atkinson House (1886), 206 W Jefferson St, is a 2-story American Foursquare design with a Tuscan columned porch extending the length of its Jefferson Street exposure. John W. Atkinson was a blacksmith and Boise pioneer, arriving in 1864. He also owned rental houses.
- Hettie M. Blucher House (1940), 208 W Jefferson St, is a 1-story Colonial Revival design with a skewed gable entry. The house was constructed for the daughter of John W. Atkinson, Hettie (Atkinson) Blucher.
- John Atkinson Rental (1903), 210 W Jefferson St, is a 1 1/2-story Queen Anne design constructed for John W. Atkinson.
- Sophia Oberdorfer House (1910), 216 W Jefferson St, is a 2-story American Foursquare design by architects Nesbet and Paradice. Sophia (Weissman) Oberdorfer immigrated from Regensburg, Germany, and lived in Silver City, Idaho, prior to moving to Boise after the death of her husband. She was an early investor in The Mode department store.
- John W. Daniels House (1890), 220 W Jefferson St, demolished. The house was a 1-story Queen Anne design later remodeled into a Bungalow. John W. Daniels was a real estate investor, an attorney, and the principal of Central School. Daniels had occupied other houses before moving to Jefferson Street, and his self-designed house on Bannock Street (demolished), later sold to Timothy Regan, was his most elaborate home and included Boise's first residential tower.
- Thomas Fitzpatrick Houses (1890, 1893); 412 3rd St, 221 State St, either demolished or remodeled. Don Hibbard's 1978 nomination form describes a 1 1/2-story dwelling with a large, centered dormer at 412 3rd St, but the site is now a parking area. Hibbard describes 221 State Street as "a simple 1-story Queen Anne cottage with a hipped roof with mock gables," but 221 State Street appears now as a 2-story Queen Anne design with corner turret and prominent bay window, and more research is needed. Thomas Fitzpatrick was a cattle rancher and a tailor.
- Hester M. Spackman House (1899), 217 W State St, is a 2 1/2-story Queen Anne design by John E. Tourtellotte. Hester M. Spackman served as Boise City Superintendent of Schools. She was described by the Idaho Statesman in 1900 as "intensely practical."
- John T. Morrison House (1905), 211 W State St, is a 2-story Swiss chalet design by J. Flood Walker, constructed for John T. Morrison. Morrison served as Idaho's sixth governor (1903–05).
- Charles M. Mays House (1895), 204 W State St, was a 2 1/2-story Queen Anne house until 1914, when Tourtellotte & Hummel redesigned it for Dr. Lucian P. McCalla in the Tudor style. Charles M. Mays was a district attorney in Boise.
- Daniel Caswell House (1904), 210 W State St, is a 2 1/2-story Queen Anne design with a corner turret and prominent finial. The Idaho Statesman described the house in 1903 as a "neat 7-room cottage." Daniel Caswell and his brothers were miners who discovered gold at Thunder Mountain. Caswell later invested in Boise real estate, and in 1903 Caswell purchased the Stone & Ramsdell Co., a supplier of painting and decorating materials.
- J.W. Weaver House (1895), 216 W State St, is a 2 1/2-story Queen Anne design constructed for Reverend J.W. Weaver, also known as J.L. Weaver. The house was purchased in 1897 by Judge Ralph P. Quarles, after Weaver and Judge Olden purchased a mine at Powder River (Oregon).
- Arthur Hodges House (1908), 220 W State St, is a 2 1/2-story Queen Anne design by Tourtellotte & Co. The house features a corner turret and a wraparound porch, with a shingled second story over cut sandstone. Arthur Hodges was a partner in the Gillenwater Sheep Company.
