= Idaho Building (1905) =

Building built for the 1905 Lewis and Clark Centennial Exposition in Portland, Oregon

Coordinates: 45.5444°N 122.7013°W

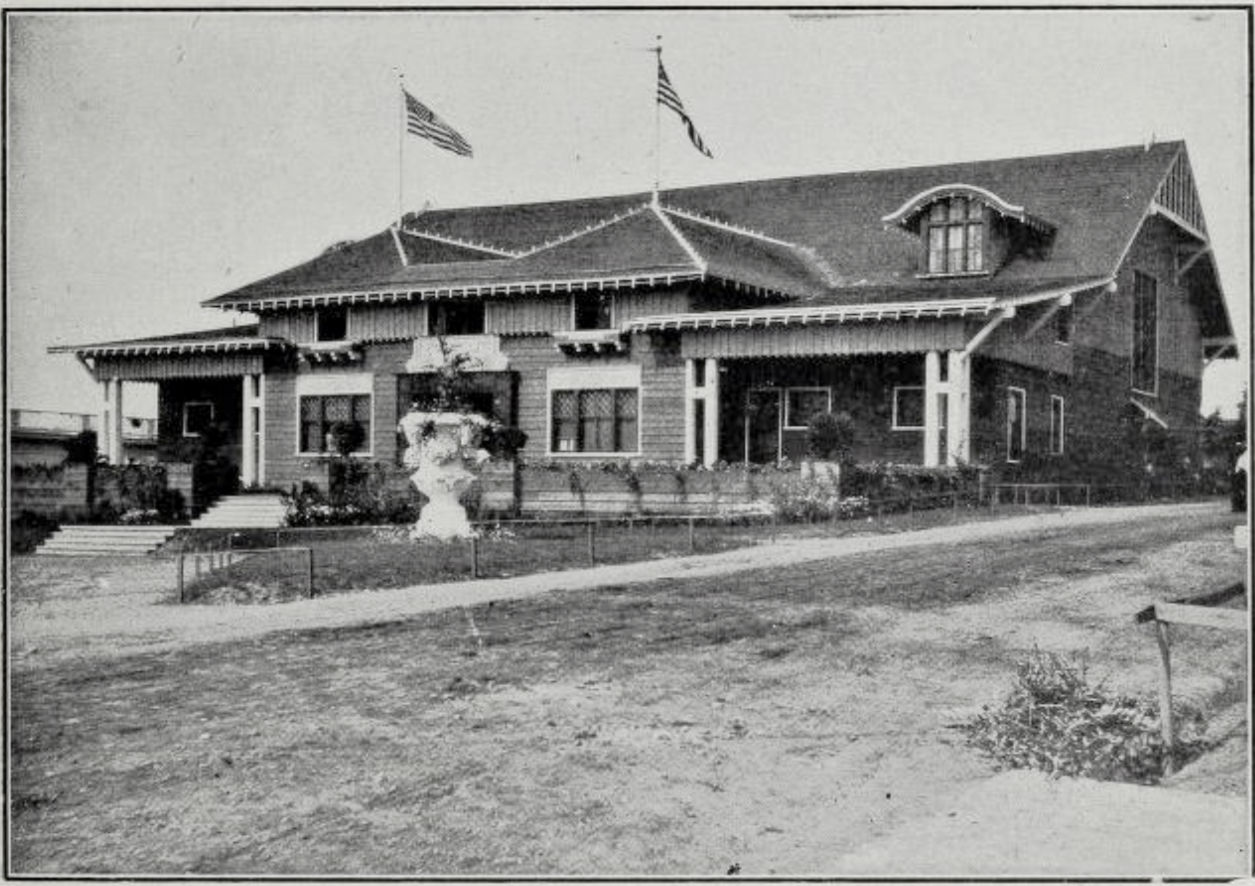
- The Idaho Building in 1905
- Interactive map of the Idaho Building area

General information
- Type: Exposition hall
- Location: Portland, Oregon
- Opened: May 21, 1905

Design and construction
- Architect: Wayland & Fennell

The Idaho Building at the 1905 Lewis and Clark Centennial Exposition in Portland, Oregon, was a 2-story exhibition hall designed by James A. Fennell of the Boise architectural firm Wayland & Fennell. When the Idaho Building opened, journalist Blaine Phillips wrote, "The building is sublimely beautiful, the vivid colors which have been applied in perfect harmony with the surroundings, serving ably to accentuate the picturesqueness and uniqueness of the construction."

Although constructed at the fair by the State of Idaho, the Idaho Building served as exhibition and entertainment space for three states without buildings, Montana, Wyoming, and Nevada, on days honoring the people of individual states.

== Architecture ==
Dimensions of the Idaho Building were 100 feet by 89 feet, including a 12-foot wide entry hall leading to an exhibition room 100 feet by 60 feet, with reception rooms for women and men on each side of the hallway. The building included offices, a breakfast room, a kitchen, and two second floor apartments. The Washington Times described the building as "of a style peculiar to inter-mountain countries," and the Deseret Evening News said it was "in a form somewhat resembling a Swiss Chalet."

At night, between 400 and 500 incandescent lamps illuminated the building.

== Exhibits ==
In addition to agricultural, mineral, and mining exhibits, the building featured exhibits made by children in Idaho schools. Thousands of educational pieces were displayed, including photographs, paintings, drawings, bound volumes, and weaving.

== Prizes ==
At the conclusion of the fair in September, the Idaho Building received the gold medal, and Idaho received another gold for excellence at exhibition. Idaho received a total of 91 gold medals, 46 silver medals, and 44 bronze medals awarded for its exhibitions.

== After the Exhibition ==
Near the end of October, 1905, the Idaho Building was purchased by Paul Wessinger, who planned to remodel it into a clubhouse. Wessinger, son-in-law of Henry Weinhard, managed Henry Weinhard's brewery and was chairman of the Lewis and Clark Centennial Exposition grounds and buildings committee. The Idaho Building may have been demolished soon after the Exhibition, however, as many of the buildings were temporary structures not well suited to Portland's climate. Other buildings withstood years of neglect prior to demolition. Parts of two buildings have survived since the Exhibition, the NCR Building in St. Johns, now a McMenamins outlet, and the American Inn in North Portland, now a condominium.

== See also ==
- Idaho Building at the 1893 World's Columbian Exposition in Chicago
- Idaho Building at the 1904 Louisiana Purchase Exposition in St. Louis
