= Idaho Building (Chicago World's Fair) =

Coordinates: 41°47′35.4″N 87°34′58.2″W

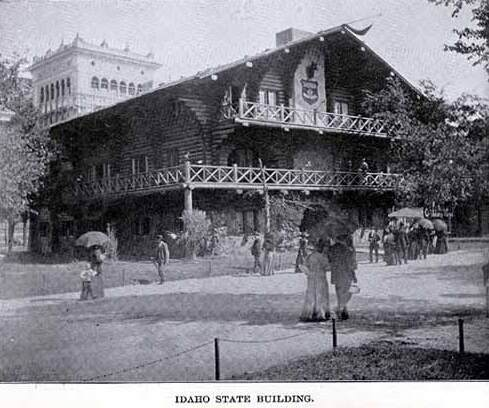
Idaho Building

The Idaho Building for the 1893 Chicago World's Fair was a rustic-design log construction designed by architect Kirtland Cutter. It was a popular favorite, visited by an estimated 18 million people. The building's design and interior furnishings were a major precursor of the Arts and Crafts movement. The structure stood on the extreme north line of Jackson Park, over a mile and a half from the Forestry Building, which it recalled.

== Construction ==
It was built entirely of native materials consisting of a log house on a foundation or basement of lava and basaltic rock. The timbers were from young cedar trees, stuffed and stained to reproduce the effects of age.

The shakes on the roof were held in place with heavy rocks and withstood the great Chicago gales. The arched stone entrance seen in the picture opened into a large room, at the end of which was a stick fireplace with a log mantel. Stairways led to the second floor, where the windows were glazed with mica. This floor had divided accommodations for men and women. Each room was decorated with a view of recalling mining scenes to the experienced persons who should enter. The men's fireplace was made of lava rock, and the andirons were made of bear traps and fish spears, while arrows, spears, tomahawks, and other Native American implements were typified in the furniture.

It was later purchased to be used as a summer residence near a Northern resort. The building was purchased by Cecilia Whipple Wallace, it was disassembled and reassembled on the southern shore of Geneva Lake Wisconsin in 1896. However, Wallace herself never resided in the house, nor was it put to use other under her ownership. The house sat vacant for several years, falling into disrepair and being rumored by locals to be haunted. In 1911 the building was permanently disassembled and some of the logs were used in the construction of the municipal pier in the city of Lake Geneva.

== See also ==
- Idaho Building at the Louisiana Purchase Exposition
- Idaho Building at the Lewis and Clark Centennial Exposition
