= List of railway bridges and viaducts =

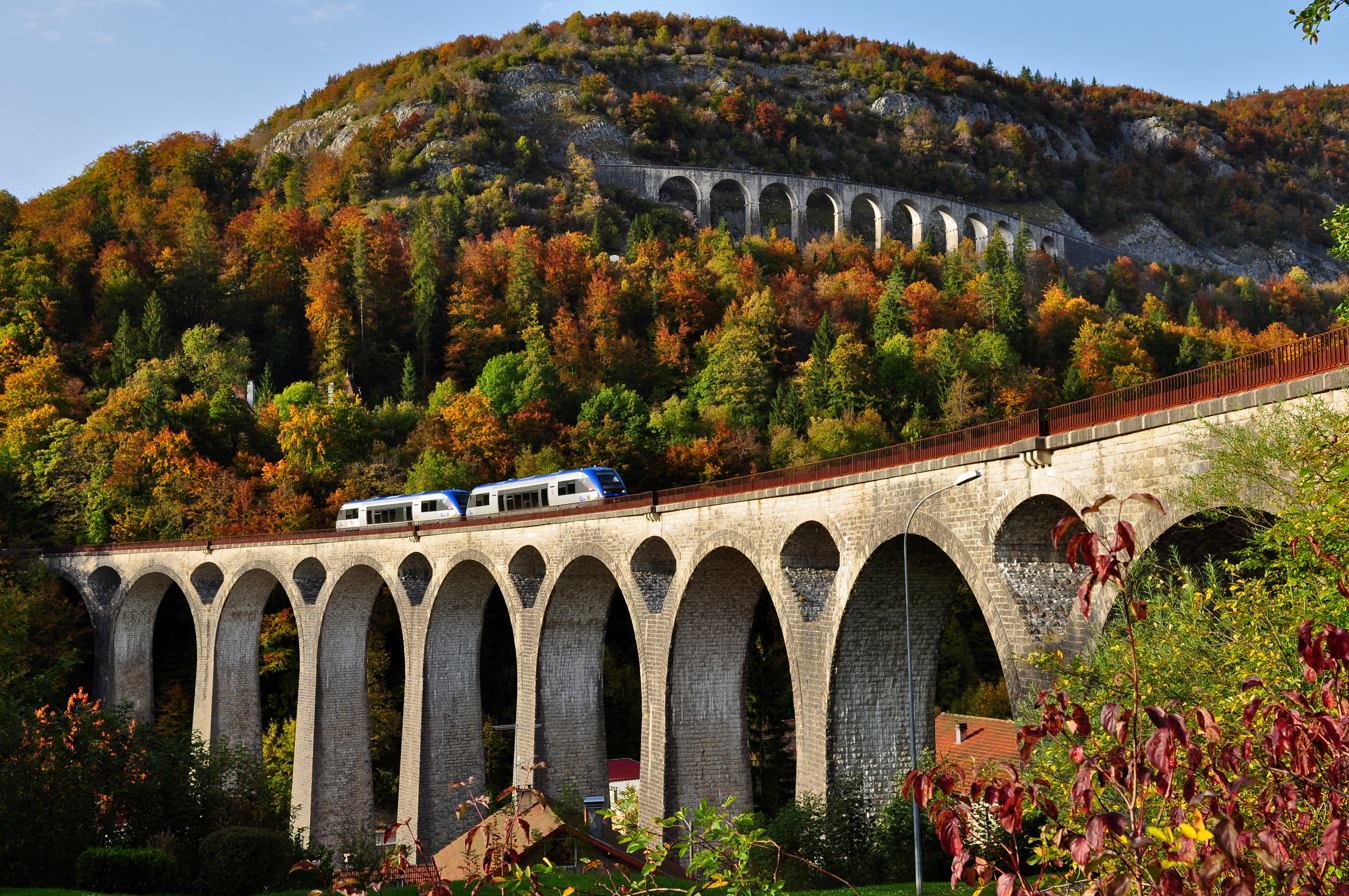
Two railway viaducts in Jura, France

Railway bridges and railway viaducts include:

== Africa ==
- Blue Nile Road and Railway Bridge, crossing the Blue Nile in Khartoum, Sudan
- El Ferdan Railway Bridge, crossing the Suez Canal near Ismailia, Egypt
- Kafue Railway Bridge, crossing the Kafue River at Kafue, Zambia

== Asia ==
- Bukit Merah Lake Railway Bridge, crossing Bukit Merah Lake in Perak, Malaysia
- Ji'an Yalu River Border Railway Bridge, crossing the Yalu River between Ji'an, Jilin Province and Manp'o, Chagang Province, North Korea
- Rupsha Rail Bridge, crossing the Rupsha River in Khulna District, Bangladesh

=== China ===
- List of railway bridges and viaducts in Hong Kong
- Beipan River Shuibai Railway Bridge, crossing the Beipan River near Liupanshui, Guizhou province
- Fenglingdu Yellow River Railway Bridge, crossing the Yellow River between Shanxi and Shaanxi provinces
- Lancang River Railway Bridge, crossing the Lancang River near Baoshan, Yunnan province
- Luokou Yellow River Railway Bridge, crossing the Yellow River in Jinan, Shandong
- Najiehe Railway Bridge, crossing the Sancha River in Guizhou province
- Qinglong Railway Bridge, crossing the Beipan River in Qinglong County, Guizhou province
- Qingshuihe Railway Bridge, crossing the Quigshui River in Ghizhou province
- Tongjiang-Nizhneleninskoye railway bridge, crossing the Amur River between Nizhneleninskoye, Russia and Tongjiang, China
- Yachi Railway Bridge, crossing the Yachi River in Guiyang province

==== Yangtze River ====
- Anqing Yangtze River Railway Bridge, near Anqing, Anhui
- Baishatuo Yangtze River Railway Bridge, in Chongqing
- Changshou Yangtze River Railway Bridge, in Changshou District, Chongqing
- Hanjiatuo Yangtze River Bridge, in Fuling District, Chongqing
- Nanjing Yangtze River Bridge, in Nanjing, Jiangsu province
- Tianxingzhou Yangtze River Bridge, in Wuhan, Hubei Province
- Wanzhou Railway Bridge, in Wanzhou District, Chongqing
- Wuhan Yangtze River Bridge, between Wuhan and Hubei provinces
- Yichang Yangtze River Railway Bridge, in Yichang, Chongqing

=== India ===
- Chenab Rail Bridge, crossing the Chenab River in the Reasi district, Jammu and Kashmir
- Naigaon railway bridge, crossing Vasai Creek in Maharashtra
- Nashipur Rail Bridge, crossing the Bhagirathi River in West Bengal
- Sevoke Railway Bridge, crossing the River Teesta at Sevoke, West Bengal
- Silver Jubilee Railway Bridge Bharuch, crossing the Narmada River in Gujarat
- Zuari Bridge, crossing the Zuari River in Goa
- Noney Railway Bridge, crossing Ijei River in the Noney district, Manipur, and is the soon-to-be world's tallest railway pier bridge.

=== Russia ===
- Komsomolsky Railway Bridge, crossing the Ob River, in Novosibirsk
- Novosibirsk Rail Bridge, crossing the Ob River in Novosibirsk
- Rail Bridge over the Iset River, Kamensk-Uralsky, crossing the Iset River in Sverdlovsk oblast
- Tongjiang-Nizhneleninskoye railway bridge, crossing the Amur River between Nizhneleninskoye, Russia and Tongjiang, China

=== South Korea ===
- Dangsan Railway Bridge, crossing the Han River in Seoul
- Hangang Railway Bridge, crossing the Han River in Seoul
- Jamsil Railway Bridge, crossing the Han River in Seoul
- Magok Railway Bridge, crossing the Han River in Seoul

=== Thailand ===
- Chakri Railway bridge, crossing the Pa Sak River in Phra Nakhon Si Ayutthaya Province
- Guang River Railway bridge, crossing the Guang River near Lamphun
- Hanuman River Railway bridge, crossing the Hanuman River in Kabin Buri District, Prachinburi Province

== Europe ==
- Athlone Railway Bridge, crossing the River Shannon at Athlone, Ireland
- Bolesławiec rail viaduct, crossing the Bóbr River in Lower Silesia, Poland
- Citadel Rail Bridge, crossing the Vistula River in Warsaw, Poland
- Eglisau railway bridge, crossing the Rhine in the canton of Zurich, Switzerland
- Finland Railway Bridge, crossing the Neva River in Saint Petersburg, Russia
- Gauja River Railway Bridge, crossing the Gauja River in Ūdriņi, Latvia
- High Speed Railway Bridge over AP7, Llinars del Valles, crossing the Mogent River in Llinars del Vallès, Catalonia, Spain
- Jänhijoki railway bridge, crossing the Jänhijoki River near Minkiö, Kanta-Häme, Finland
- Jonava railway bridge, crossing the Neris River in Jonava, Lithuania
- Jizera Railway Bridge, crossing the Jizera River between Kořenov and Tanvald, Czech Republic
- Jonava railway bridge, crossing the Neris in Jonava, Lithuania
- Kerch railway bridge, crossing the Kerch Strait between Krasnodar Krai, Russia and Crimea
- Koblenz Aare railway bridge, crossing the River Aare in Aargau canton, Switzerland
- Liffey Railway Bridge, crossing the River Liffey in Dublin, Ireland
- Limfjord Railway Bridge, crossing the Limfjord in North Jutland, Denmark
- Meschio Railway Bridge, crossing the Meschio River between Sacile and Ponte della Muda in Italy
- Moscow-Riga Railroad Bridge, crossing the Moscow Canal between Tushino and Shchukino Districts in northwestern Moscow, Russia
- New Railway Bridge, crossing the Sava river in Belgrade, Serbia
- Nijmegen railway bridge, crossing the River Waal in Nijmegen, Netherlands
- Culemborg railway bridge, crossing the Lek river in Culemborg, Netherlands
- Northern Railway Bridge, crossing the Danube in Vienna, Austria
- Nyköping Railway Bridge, crossing the river Nyköpingsån in Nyköping, Sweden
- Old Railway Bridge, crossing the Sava river in Belgrade, Serbia
- Petrovskyi Railroad Bridge, crossing the Dnieper in Kyiv, Ukraine
- Railway Bridge, Kaunas, crossing the Nemunas River in Kaunas, Lithuania
- Railway Bridge, Riga, crossing the Daugava river in Riga, Latvia
- Road–Railway Bridge, Novi Sad, crossing the Danube in Novi Sad, Serbia
- Struve Railroad Bridge, crossing the Dnieper in Kyiv, Ukraine
- Torne River Railway Bridge, crossing the Torne River between Haparanda, Sweden and Tornio, Finland
- Vyšehrad railway bridge, crossing the Vltava River in Prague, Czech Republic

=== Germany ===
- Dömitz Railway Bridge, crossing the Elbe River near Dömitz
- Duisburg-Hochfeld Railway Bridge, crossing the Rhine in Duisburg
- Hamm Railway Bridge, crossing the Rhine in Düsseldorf
- Haus-Knipp railway bridge, crossing the Rhine in Duisburg
- Wesel Railway Bridge, crossing the Rhine at Wesel

=== United Kingdom ===
- Lagan Railway Bridge, crossing the River Lagan in Belfast, Northern Ireland

==== England ====
- Ballingham Railway Bridge, crossing the River Wye in Ballingham
- Chepstow Railway Bridge, crossing the River Wye between England and Wales
- Goole railway swing bridge, crossing the River Ouse near Goole
- Great Northern Railway Bridge Number 184, crossing the River Nene in Peterborough
- Lipwood Railway Bridge, crossing the South Tyne near Lipwood, Northumberland
- Monkwearmouth Railway Bridge, crossing the River Wear at Sunderland
- Railway Bridge (171c) Grand Union Canal, in Milton Keynes
- Ridley Railway Bridge, crossing the River South Tyne in Northumberland
- River Irwell Railway Bridge, crossing the River Irwell in Manchester
- Runcorn Railway Bridge, crossing the River Mersey in Cheshire
- Scarborough Bridge, crossing the River Ouse in York
- Scotswood Railway Bridge, crossing the River Tyne in Tyneside
- Severn Railway Bridge, crossing the Severn Estuary in Gloucestershire
- Sheepwash Channel Railway Bridge, crossing Sheepwash Channel in Oxford
- Surtees Rail Bridge, crossing the River Tees in Stockton-on-Tees
- Warden Railway Bridge, crossing the River South Tyne in Northumberland
- Wylam Railway Bridge, crossing the River Tyne at Hagg Bank, Northumberland

===== River Thames =====
- Appleford Railway Bridge, near Appleford-on-Thames, Oxfordshire
- Barnes Railway Bridge, in London
- Battersea Railway Bridge, in London
- Black Potts Railway Bridge, in Windsor
- Blackfriars Railway Bridge, in London
- Bourne End Railway Bridge, in Bourne End
- Cannon Street Railway Bridge, in London
- Fulham Railway Bridge, in London
- Gatehampton Railway Bridge, in Lower Basildon
- Kennington Railway Bridge, in Kennington
- Kew Railway Bridge, in London
- Kingston Railway Bridge, in Kingston upon Thames
- Maidenhead Railway Bridge, between Maidenhead and Taplow
- Moulsford Railway Bridge, at Moulsford
- Nuneham Railway Bridge, near Abingdon, Oxfordshire
- Osney Rail Bridge, in Oxford
- Richmond Railway Bridge, in Richmond
- Shiplake Railway Bridge, at Wargrave
- Staines Railway Bridge, at Staines-upon-Thames
- Windsor Railway Bridge, in Windsor

==== Scotland ====
- Ballindalloch Railway Bridge, crossing the River Spey in Moray
- Banavie Railway Swing Bridge, crossing the Caledonian Canal at Banavie
- Caledonian Railway Bridge, crossing the River Clyde in Glasgow
- Dalmarnock Railway Bridge, crossing the River Clyde in Dalmarnock
- Tay Bridge, crossing the Firth of Tay in Fife

==== Wales ====
- Chepstow Railway Bridge, crossing the River Wye between England and Wales
- Conwy Railway Bridge, crossing the River Conwy in Conwy
- St. Julian's railway bridge, crossing the River Usk near Newport
- Usk Railway Bridge, crossing the River Usk in Newport

== North America ==
=== Canada ===
- Canadian Northern Railway Bridge (Prince Albert, Saskatchewan), crossing the North Saskatchewan River in Prince Albert, Saskatchewan
- CPR Bridge (Saskatoon), crossing the South Saskatchewan River in Saskatoon, Saskatchewan
- Fredericton Railway Bridge, crossing the Saint John River in Fredericton, New Brunswick
- Mission Railway Bridge, crossing the Fraser River between Mission and Abbotsford, British Columbia
- Prince George CNR Bridge, crossing the Fraser River at Prince George, British Columbia
- Red Deer Canadian Pacific Railway Bridge, crossing the Red Deer River in Red Deer, Alberta
- Reversing Falls Railway Bridge, crossing the Saint John River in Saint John, New Brunswick
- Saint Croix–Vanceboro Railway Bridge, crossing the St. Croix River between St. Croix, New Brunswick and Vanceboro, Maine
- Second Narrows Rail Bridge, crossing the Burrard Inlet between Vancouver and North Vancouver, British Columbia

==== Ontario ====
- Canadian Northern Ontario Railway Federal Bridge, crossing the Rideau River in Ottawa
- International Railway Bridge, crossing the Niagara River between Fort Erie, Ontario and Buffalo, New York
- Michigan Central Railway Bridge, crossing the Niagara Gorge between Niagara Falls, Ontario and Niagara Falls, New York
- Michigan Central Railway Cantilever Bridge, crossing the Niagara Gorge between Niagara Falls, New York, and Niagara Falls, Ontario
- Sault Ste. Marie International Railroad Bridge, crossing the St. Marys River between Sault Ste. Marie, Michigan and Sault Ste. Marie, Ontario

==== Quebec ====
- Bordeaux Railway Bridge, crossing the Rivière des Prairies between Montreal and Laval
- Laurier Railway Bridge, crossing the Rivière des Prairies in Montreal
- Pierre Le Gardeur Railway Bridge, crossing the Rivière des Prairies in Montreal
- Saint-Laurent Railway Bridge, crossing the Saint Lawrence River and Seaway between Montreal and Kahnawake

=== Mexico ===
- Eagle Pass Union Pacific International Railroad Bridge, crossing the Rio Grande between Eagle Pass, Texas and Piedras Negras, Coahuila
- Laredo International Railway Bridge 2, crossing the Rio Grande between Laredo, Texas, and Nuevo Laredo, Tamaulipas
- Laredo–Colombia International Railway Bridge 3, crossing the Rio Grande between Laredo, Texas, and Nuevo Laredo, Tamaulipas
- Texas Mexican Railway International Bridge, crossing the Rio Grande between Laredo, Texas, and Nuevo Laredo, Tamaulipas
- Union Pacific International Railroad Bridge (Eagle Pass–Piedras Negras), crossing the Rio Grande between Eagle Pass, Texas and Piedras Negras, Coahuila

=== United States ===
- Amtrak Railroad Anacostia Bridge, crossing the Anacostia River in Washington, D.C.
- Amtrak Susquehanna River Bridge, crossing the Susquehanna River between Havre de Grace and Perryville, Maryland
- Anacostia Railroad Bridge, crossing the Anacostia River in Washington, D.C.
- Apache Canyon Railroad Bridge, crossing Galisteo Creek in Santa Fe County, New Mexico
- B & O Railroad Potomac River Crossing, crossing the Potomac River between Sandy Hook, Maryland and Harpers Ferry, West Virginia
- B & O Railroad Viaduct, crossing the Ohio River in Bellaire, Ohio
- Bahia Honda Rail Bridge, crossing the Bahia Honda Channel in the Florida Keys, Florida
- Big Black River Railroad Bridge, crossing the Big Black River between Warren and Hinds counties, Mississippi
- Black Point Railroad Bridge, crossing the Petaluma River in Black Point-Green Point, California
- Boston and Providence Railroad Bridge, crossing Ten Mile River in East Providence, Rhode Island
- East Shoreham Covered Railroad Bridge, crossing the Lemon Fair River near East Shoreham, Vermont
- Fairmont Railroad Bridge, crossing the Monongahela River near Fairmont, West Virginia
- First Flats Rail Bridge, crossing the Cuyahoga River in Cleveland, Ohio
- Fisher Covered Railroad Bridge, crossing the Lamoille River in Wolcott, Vermont
- Fort Sumner Railroad Bridge, crossing the Pecos River near Fort Sumner, New Mexico
- Gimlet Pegram Truss Railroad Bridge, crossing the Big Wood River in Blaine County, Idaho
- Harvey Railroad Bridge, crossing the Des Moines River east of Harvey, Iowa
- Hi-Line Railroad Bridge, crossing the Sheyenne River in Valley City, North Dakota
- Hunting Creek Railroad Bridge, crossing Hunting Creek at Morganton, North Carolina
- India Point Railroad Bridge, crossing the Seekonk River between Providence and East Providence, Rhode Island
- Kansas City Southern Railroad Bridge, Cross Bayou, crossing Cross Bayou in Shreveport, Louisiana
- Norfolk Southern Lake Pontchartrain Bridge, crossing Lake Pontchartrain in Louisiana
- Norfolk Southern Tennessee River Bridge, crossing the Tennessee River at Decatur, Alabama
- Omega Pond Railroad Bridge, crossing Omega Pond in East Providence, Rhode Island
- Pacific Electric Railroad Bridge crossing Torrance Boulevard in Torrance, California
- Republican River Pegram Truss, crossing the Republican River near Concordia, Kansas
- Rosalia Railroad Bridge, crossing Pine Creek in Rosalia, Washington
- Saint Croix–Vanceboro Railway Bridge, crossing the St. Croix River between St. Croix, New Brunswick and Vanceboro, Maine
- Santa Fe Arroyo Seco Railroad Bridge, crossing the Arroyo Seco canyon in Highland Park, Los Angeles, California
- Seabrook Railroad Bridge, crossing the Industrial Canal in New Orleans, Louisiana
- Shirley Railroad Bridge, crossing the Little Red River in Shirley, Arkansas
- Swanton Covered Railroad Bridge, crossing the Missisquoi River in Swanton, Vermont
- Travis L. Castle Railroad Trestle, crossing the Kanawha River in Charleston, West Virginia
- Wabash Railroad Bridge, crossing the Des Moines River south of Pella, Iowa

==== Columbia River ====
- Beverly Railroad Bridge, near Beverly, Washington
- Burlington Northern Railroad Bridge 9.6, between Portland, Oregon, and Vancouver, Washington
- Columbia River Railroad Bridge, between Portland, Oregon, and Vancouver, Washington
- Rock Island Railroad Bridge (Columbia River), at Rock Island, Washington

==== Delaware River ====
- Delair Memorial Railroad Bridge, between Philadelphia, Pennsylvania and Pennsauken Township, New Jersey
- Lehigh Valley Railroad, Delaware River Bridge, between Easton, Pennsylvania and Phillipsburg, New Jersey
- Morrisville–Trenton Railroad Bridge, between Morrisville, Pennsylvania and Trenton, New Jersey
- West Trenton Railroad Bridge, between Bucks County, Pennsylvania and Mercer County, New Jersey

==== Mississippi River ====
- Burlington Rail Bridge, between Burlington, Iowa and Gulfport, Illinois
- Clinton Railroad Bridge, between Clinton, Iowa and Fulton, Illinois
- Crescent Rail Bridge, between Davenport, Iowa and Rock Island, Illinois
- Dubuque Rail Bridge, between Dubuque, Iowa and East Dubuque, Illinois
- Keithsburg Rail Bridge, between Louisa County, Iowa and Keithsburg, Illinois
- Keokuk Rail Bridge, between Keokuk, Iowa and Hamilton, Illinois
- La Crosse Rail Bridge, between La Crescent, Minnesota and La Crosse, Wisconsin
- Louisiana Railroad Bridge, between Louisiana, Missouri and Pike County, Illinois
- Newport Rail Bridge, between Inver Grove Heights and St. Paul Park, Minnesota
- Northern Pacific Bridge Number 9, in Minneapolis, Minnesota
- Pile–Pontoon Railroad Bridge, between Marquette, Iowa and Prairie du Chien, Wisconsin
- Quincy Rail Bridge, between Quincy, Illinois and West Quincy, Missouri
- St. Paul Union Pacific Rail Bridge, between Saint Paul and South Saint Paul, Minnesota
- Winona Rail Bridge, between Winona, Minnesota and Winona Junction, Buffalo County, Wisconsin

==== Missouri River ====
- Chicago and North Western Railroad Bridge, in Pierre, South Dakota
- Glasgow Railroad Bridge, between Howard and Saline counties, Missouri
- Illinois Central Missouri River Bridge, between Council Bluffs, Iowa and Omaha, Nebraska
- Pencoyd Railroad Bridge, in Kansas City, Missouri
- St. Joseph Union Pacific Bridge, between St. Joseph, Missouri, and Elwood, Kansas
- Sibley Railroad Bridge, between Jackson and Ray counties, Missouri

==== Ohio River ====
- C&O Railroad Bridge, between Cincinnati, Ohio and Covington, Kentucky
- Cairo Rail Bridge, between Wickliffe, Kentucky and Cairo, Illinois
- East Liverpool Railroad Bridge, between Chester, West Virginia and East Liverpool, Ohio
- Wabash Bridge (Ohio River), between Mingo Junction, Ohio and Follansbee, West Virginia

==== Connecticut ====
- Amtrak Bascule Bridge No. 116.74, crossing the Niantic River between East Lyme and Waterford
- Blackledge River Railroad Bridge, crossing the Blackledge River in New London County
- Devon Railroad Bridge, crossing the Housatonic River between Milford and Stratford
- Farmington River Railroad Bridge, crossing the Farmington River in Windsor
- Housatonic River Railroad Bridge, crossing the Housatonic River between Milford and Stratford
- Mianus River Railroad Bridge, crossing the Mianus River in Greenwich
- Mystic River Railroad Bridge, crossing the Mystic River in Mystic
- Norwalk River Railroad Bridge, crossing the Norwalk River in Norwalk
- Pequonnock River Railroad Bridge, crossing the Pequonnock River in Bridgeport
- River Road Stone Arch Railroad Bridge, crossing River Road in Salmon River State Forest, Colchester
- Saugatuck River Railroad Bridge, crossing the Saugatuck River in Westport
- South Norwalk Railroad Bridge crossing Main and Washington Streets in South Norwalk

===== Connecticut River =====
- Amtrak Old Saybrook–Old Lyme Bridge, between Lyme and Old Saybrook
- Hartford–East Hartford railroad bridge, between Hartford and East Hartford
- Middletown–Portland railroad bridge, in Middletown
- Warehouse Point railroad bridge, between Enfield and Suffield

==== Idaho ====
- Cold Springs Pegram Truss Railroad Bridge, crossing the Big Wood River near Ketchum
- Conant Creek Pegram Truss Railroad Bridge, crossing Conant Creek in Fremont County
- Gimlet Pegram Truss Railroad Bridge, crossing the Big Wood River in Blaine County
- Grace Pegram Truss Railroad Bridge, crossing the Bear River near Grace
- Ririe A Pegram Truss Railroad Bridge, crossing the Snake River near Ririe
- Ririe B Pegram Truss Railroad Bridge, crossing the Snake River flood channel north of Ririe
- St. Anthony Pegram Truss Railroad Bridge, crossing Henrys Fork in Fremont County

==== Illinois ====
- Canal Street railroad bridge, crossing the Chicago River in Chicago
- Chicago & North Western Railway Stone Arch Bridge, crossing South Kinnikinnick Creek near Roscoe
- Chicago, Milwaukee & St. Paul Railway, Bridge No. Z-2, crossing the North Branch Canal of the Chicago River in Chicago
- Illinois Central Stone Arch Railroad Bridges, crossing three streets in Dixon
- Kinnikinnick Creek Railway Bridge, crossing South Kinnikinnick Creek near Roscoe
- Kinzie Street railroad bridge, crossing the Chicago River in Chicago
- Lake Shore and Michigan Southern Railway, Bridge No. 6, crossing the Calumet River in Chicago
- North Avenue railroad bridge, crossing the North Branch Canal of the Chicago River in Chicago
- Ottawa Rail Bridge, crossing the Illinois River in Ottawa

==== Maryland ====
- B & O Railroad Potomac River Crossing, crossing the Potomac River between Sandy Hook, Maryland and Harpers Ferry, West Virginia
- Baltimore & Ohio Railroad Bridge, Antietam Creek, crossing Antietam Creek near Keedysville
- Bollman Truss Railroad Bridge, crossing the Little Patuxent River at Savage
- P.W. & B. Railroad Bridge, crossing the Susquehanna River between Havre de Grace and Perryville
- Thomas Viaduct, Baltimore & Ohio Railroad, crossing the Patapsco River between Relay and Elkridge, Maryland
- Tuscarora Creek railroad bridge, crossing Tuscarora Creek in Frederick County

==== Massachusetts ====
- Buzzards Bay Railroad Bridge, crossing the Cape Cod Canal in Bourne
- Canalside Rail Trail Bridge, crossing the Connecticut River between Deerfield and Montague
- Cape Cod Canal Railroad Bridge, crossing the Cape Cod Canal in Bourne
- Connecticut River railroad bridge (Northfield, Massachusetts), crossing the Connecticut River in Franklin County
- Deerfield–Montague railroad bridge, crossing the Connecticut River in Deerfield
- Grand Junction Railroad Bridge, crossing the Charles River in Boston
- Western Railroad Stone Arch Bridges, crossing the Westfield River in Hampden, Hampshire, and Berkshire counties

==== Michigan ====
- Derby Street-Grand Trunk Western Railroad Bridge, crossing under Derby Street in Birmingham
- Fort Street–Pleasant Street and Norfolk & Western Railroad Viaduct, crossing under two streets in Detroit
- Sault Ste. Marie International Railroad Bridge, crossing the St. Marys River between Sault Ste. Marie, Michigan and Sault Ste. Marie, Ontario
- Thomson Road–Air Line Railroad Bridge, crossing the Michigan Air Line Railroad in Howard Township
- Trowbridge Road-Grand Trunk Western Railroad Bridge, crossing under Trowbridge Road in Bloomfield Hills

==== New Hampshire ====
- Contoocook Railroad Bridge, crossing the Contoocook River in Contoocook
- Goffstown Covered Railroad Bridge, crossing the Piscataquog River in Goffstown
- Hillsborough Railroad Bridge, crossing the Contoocook River in Hillsborough
- Sulphite Railroad Bridge, crossing the Winnipesaukee River in Franklin

==== New Jersey ====
- Arthur Kill Railroad Bridge, crossing the Arthur Kill between Elizabethport, New Jersey and Staten Island, New York
- CRRNJ Passaic River Bridge, crossing the Passaic River between Newark and Kearny
- DB Draw (Erie Railroad), crossing the Hackensack River between Secaucus and Kearny
- Lehigh Valley Railroad Bridge, crossing Newark Bay between Newark and Bayonne
- WR Railroad Bridge, crossing the Passaic River between Newark and Kearny

==== New York ====
- Arthur Kill Railroad Bridge, crossing the Arthur Kill between Elizabethport, New Jersey and Staten Island, New York
- Delaware and Hudson Railroad Bridge (Clinton County, New York), crossing the Ausable River in Clinton County
- International Railway Bridge, crossing the Niagara River between Fort Erie, Ontario and Buffalo, New York
- Michigan Central Railway Bridge, crossing the Niagara Gorge between Niagara Falls, Ontario and Niagara Falls, New York
- Michigan Central Railway Cantilever Bridge, crossing the Niagara Gorge between Niagara Falls, New York, and Niagara Falls, Ontario
- New York Connecting Railroad Bridge, crossing the East River in New York City
- Poughkeepsie-Highland Railroad Bridge, crossing the Hudson River between Poughkeepsie and Highland

==== Oregon ====
- Burlington Northern Railroad Bridge 8.8, crossing North Portland Harbor in Portland
- Crooked River Railroad Bridge, crossing the Crooked River in Jefferson County
- Oregon Slough Railroad Bridge, crossing North Portland Harbor in Portland
- Oregon Trunk Rail Bridge, crossing the Columbia River between Wishram Washington and Celilo Village

===== Willamette River =====
- Burlington Northern Railroad Bridge 5.1, in Portland
- Chambers Covered Railroad Bridge, crossing the Coast Fork in Cottage Grove
- Lake Oswego Railroad Bridge, in Clackamas County
- Southern Pacific Railroad Bridge at Lake Oswego, in Clackamas County
- St. Johns Railroad Bridge, in Portland
- Union Pacific Railroad Bridge at Lake Oswego, in Clackamas County
- Union Street Railroad Bridge, in Salem
- Willamette River Railroad Bridge, in Portland
- Wilsonville railroad bridge, at Wilsonville

==== Pennsylvania ====
- Banning Railroad Bridge, crossing the Youghiogheny River in Perry Township
- Beaver River Railroad Bridge, crossing the Beaver River in New Brighton
- Deer Creek Bridge, Stewartstown Railroad, crossing Deer Creek in York County
- Delta Trestle Bridge, Maryland and Pennsylvania Railroad, crossing a ravine in York County
- Muddy Creek Bridge, Maryland and Pennsylvania Railroad, crossing Muddy Creek in Lower Chanceford and Peach Bottom Townships
- Ohio Connecting Railroad Bridge, crossing the Ohio River in Pittsburgh
- PC&Y Railroad Bridge, crossing the Ohio River in Allegheny County
- Pennsylvania Railroad Bridge over Shavers Creek, crossing Shavers Creek between Petersburg and Logan Township
- Pennsylvania Railroad Old Bridge over Standing Stone Creek, crossing Standing Stone Creek in Huntingdon
- Ridge Road Bridge, Stewartstown Railroad, crossing Ridge Road in York County
- Rochester-Beaver Railroad Bridge, crossing the Beaver River between Rochester and Bridgewater boroughs
- Scott Creek Bridge-North, Maryland and Pennsylvania Railroad, crossing Scott Creek in York County
- Stone Arch Road Bridge, Stewartstown Railroad, crossing Stone Arch Road in York County
- Valley Road Bridge, Stewartstown Railroad, crossing Valley Road in Hopewell Township

===== Allegheny River =====
- 33rd Street Railroad Bridge, in Pittsburgh
- Bessemer & Lake Erie Railroad Bridge, between Plum and Harmar Township
- Brilliant Branch Railroad Bridge, between Pittsburgh and Aspinwall
- Fort Wayne Railroad Bridge, in Pittsburgh
- Herr's Island Railroad Bridge, in Pittsburgh
- Oil City Pennsylvania Railroad Bridge, at Oil City
- West Penn Railroad Bridge, in Pittsburgh

===== Monongahela River =====
- Belle Vernon Railroad Bridge, between Speers and North Belle Vernon
- Glenwood B&O Railroad Bridge, in Pittsburgh
- McKeesport Connecting Railroad Bridge, between McKeesport and Duquesne
- Pittsburgh & Lake Erie Railroad Bridge at Munhall, between Munhall and Rankin
- Speers Railroad Bridge, between Speers and North Belle Vernon
- Union Railroad Clairton Bridge, between Clairton and Lincoln

===== Schulykill River =====
- B&O Railroad Bridge, in Philadelphia
- Columbia Railroad Bridge, in Philadelphia
- Connecting Railway Bridge, in Fairmount Park
- Falls Rail Bridge, in Fairmount Park
- New York Railroad Bridge, in Fairmount Park
- Pennsylvania Railroad, Connecting Railway Bridge, in Fairmount Park
- Philadelphia & Reading Railroad Bridge at West Falls, in Philadelphia
- Philadelphia & Reading Railroad Mule Bridge, in Philadelphia
- Philadelphia & Reading Railroad Schuylkill River Viaduct, in Fairmount Park
- Philadelphia, Wilmington and Baltimore Railroad Bridge No. 1, in Philadelphia
- Reading Railroad Bridge, in Fairmount Park
- Schuylkill Arsenal Railroad Bridge, in Philadelphia

===== Susquehanna River =====
- Cumberland Valley Railroad Bridge, at Harrisburg
- Pennsylvania Railroad Bridge (Columbia, Pennsylvania), between Columbia and Wrightsville
- Philadelphia & Reading Railroad Bridge (Harrisburg, Pennsylvania), between Harrisburg and Cumberland County
- South Pennsylvania Railroad Bridge (Harrisburg, Pennsylvania), in Harrisburg

==== Virginia ====
- Belle Isle railroad bridge, crossing the James River in Richmond
- Oak Ridge Railroad Overpass, crossing under State Route 653 near Shipman
- Orange and Alexandria Railroad Bridge Piers, in Bull Run between Fairfax and Prince William counties
- Orange and Alexandria Railroad Hooff's Run Bridge, crossing Hooff's Run in Alexandria
- Richmond and Petersburg Railroad Bridge, crossing the James River in Richmond
- Valley Railroad Bridge, crossing the Gish Branch at Salem
- Valley Railroad Stone Bridge, crossing Folly Mills Creek in Augusta County

== Oceania ==
=== Australia ===
- Fremantle Railway Bridge, crossing the Swan River in Fremantle, Western Australia
- Longford Railway Bridge, crossing the South Esk River, in Longford, Tasmania

==== New South Wales ====
- Argyle Street railway bridge, crossing Argyle Street in Moss Vale
- Bowenfels rail viaducts, crossing Farmers Creek in Bowenfels
- Bredbo River railway bridge, crossing the Bredbo River at Bredbo
- Burbong railway bridge, crossing the Molonglo River in Queanbeyan
- Burwood rail underbridge, crossing Burwood Road in Sydney
- Como railway bridge, crossing the Georges River in Sydney
- Coxs River railway bridges, crossing the Coxs River in Lithgow
- Hawkesbury River railway bridge, crossing the Hawkesbury River in New South Wales
- Ingalara Creek railway bridge, crossing Ingalara Creek at Michelago
- Lachlan River railway bridge, crossing the Lachlan River at Cowra
- Leycester Creek railway bridge, crossing Leycester Creek in Lismore
- Macdonald River railway bridge, Woolbrook, in Woolbrook
- Macleay River railway bridge, Kempsey, crossing the Macleay River in Kempsey Shire
- Macquarie River railway bridge, Bathurst, crossing the Macquarie River in Bathurst
- Macquarie River railway bridge, Dubbo, crossing the Macquarie River in Dubbo
- Manning River railway bridge, crossing the Manning River at Mount George
- Meadowbank Rail Bridge over Parramatta River, crossing the Parramatta River in Canada Bay
- Molonglo River railway bridge, crossing the Molonglo River in Queanbeyan
- Murray River railway bridge, Albury–Wodonga, crossing the Murray River between Albury and Wodonga
- Murray River road and railway bridge, Tocumwal, crossing the Murray River at Tocumwal
- Murrumbidgee River railway bridge, Gundagai, crossing the Murrumbidgee River in Gundagai
- Murrumbidgee River railway bridge, Narrandera, crossing the Murrumbidgee River in Narrandera Shire
- Murrumbidgee River railway bridge, Wagga Wagga, crossing the Murrumbidgee River in Wagga Wagga
- Nepean River railway bridge, Menangle, crossing the Nepean River in Menangle
- Old Como railway bridge, crossing the Georges River between Como and Oatley
- Parramatta River railway bridge, Meadowbank, crossing the Parramatta River in Canada Bay
- Peel River railway bridge, Tamworth, crossing the Peel River in North Tamworth
- Queanbeyan River railway bridge, crossing the Queanbeyan River in Queanbeyan
- Severn River railway bridge, Dundee, crossing the Severn River at Dundee
- Tenterfield Creek railway bridge, Sunnyside, crossing Tenterfield Creek in Tenterfield Shire
- Wyaldra Creek railway bridge, Gulgong, crossing Wyaldra Creek at Gulgong
- Yarraford Rail Bridge over Beardy Waters, crossing Beardy Waters near Glen Innes
- Yass River railway bridge, Yass, crossing the Yass River at Yass

==== Queensland ====
- Alexandra Railway Bridge, crossing the Fitzroy River in Rockhampton
- Angellala Rail Bridge, crossing Angellala Creek in Sommariva
- Bremer River Rail Bridge, crossing the Bremer River in Ipswich
- Burnett railway bridge, crossing the Burnett River in Bundaberg
- Deep Creek Railway Bridge, crossing Deep Creek in Didcot
- Harlin Rail Bridge, crossing Ivory Creek at Harlin
- Humphery Railway Bridge, crossing a dry gully near Humphery
- Ideraway Creek Railway Bridge, crossing Ideraway Creek at Ideraway
- Imbil Railway Bridge, crossing Yabba Creek in Imbil
- Indooroopilly Railway Bridge, crossing the Brisbane River in Queensland
- Lockyer Creek Railway Bridge (Clarendon), crossing Lockyer Creek at Clarendon
- Lockyer Creek Railway Bridge (Lockyer), crossing Lockyer Creek at Lockyer
- Lockyer Creek Railway Bridge (Murphys Creek), crossing Lockyer Creek at Murphys Creek
- Sadliers Crossing Railway Bridge, crossing the Bremer River in Wulkuraka
- Saltwater Creek Railway Bridge, crossing Bundaberg Creek in Bundaberg
- Splitters Creek Railway Bridge, crossing Splitters Creek in Bundaberg Region
- Steep Rocky Creek Railway Bridge, crossing a dry wash near Ideraway
- Swansons Rail Bridge, crossing an unnamed gully in the Lockyer Valley Region

==== Victoria ====
- Cremorne Railway Bridge, crossing the Yarra River in Melbourne
- Hawthorn Railway Bridge, crossing the Yarra River in Melbourne
- Murray River railway bridge, Albury–Wodonga, crossing the Murray River between Albury and Wodonga
- Saltwater River Rail Bridge, crossing the Maribyrnong River in Melbourne

=== New Zealand ===
- Pomare Rail Bridge, crossing the Hutt River
- Silverstream Rail Bridge, crossing the Hutt River

== South America ==
- Rollemberg–Vuolo Road–Railway Bridge, crossing the Parana River, between the states of São Paulo and Mato Grosso do Sul, Brazil

== See also ==
- B & O Bridge (disambiguation)
- CNR Bridge (disambiguation)
- CPR Bridge (disambiguation)
- Level crossing
- International Railroad Bridge (disambiguation)
- Norfolk Southern Bridge (disambiguation)
- Pegram Truss Railroad Bridge (disambiguation)
- Pennsylvania Railroad Bridge (disambiguation)
- Rock Island Railroad Bridge (disambiguation)
- Union Pacific Bridge (disambiguation)
- Wabash Bridge (disambiguation)
