= B & O Bridge =

B & O Bridge or B&O Bridge may refer to:

- Baltimore & Ohio Railroad Bridge, Antietam Creek, crossing Antietam Creek near Keedysville, Maryland
- B & O Railroad Potomac River Crossing, crossing the Potomac River between Sandy Hook, Maryland, and Harpers Ferry, West Virginia
- B&O Railroad Bridge, crossing the Schuylkill River in Philadelphia, Pennsylvania
- B & O Railroad Viaduct, crossing the Ohio River in Bellaire, Ohio
- Glenwood B&O Railroad Bridge, crossing the Monongahela River in Pittsburgh, Pennsylvania
- Thomas Viaduct, Baltimore & Ohio Railroad, crossing the Patapsco River between Relay and Elkridge, Maryland
