= Pennsylvania Railroad Bridge =

Pennsylvania Railroad Bridge may refer to:

- Pennsylvania Railroad Bridge (Columbia, Pennsylvania), over the Susquehanna River
- Morrisville–Trenton Railroad Bridge, over the Delaware River
- Canal Street railroad bridge, Chicago, Illinois
- Fourteenth Street Bridge (Ohio River), Louisville, Kentucky
- Delta Trestle Bridge, Maryland and Pennsylvania Railroad, Delta, Pennsylvania
- Pennsylvania Railroad Old Bridge over Standing Stone Creek, Huntingdon, Pennsylvania
- Pennsylvania Railroad Bridge over Shavers Creek, Petersburg, Pennsylvania
- Fort Wayne Railroad Bridge, Pittsburgh, Pennsylvania, also known as the Pennsylvania Railroad Bridge
- Muddy Creek Bridge, Maryland and Pennsylvania Railroad, Sunnyburn, Pennsylvania
- Stone Bridge (Johnstown, Pennsylvania)
