= Immortal Ten Bridge =

Bridge in Round Rock, Texas, U.S.

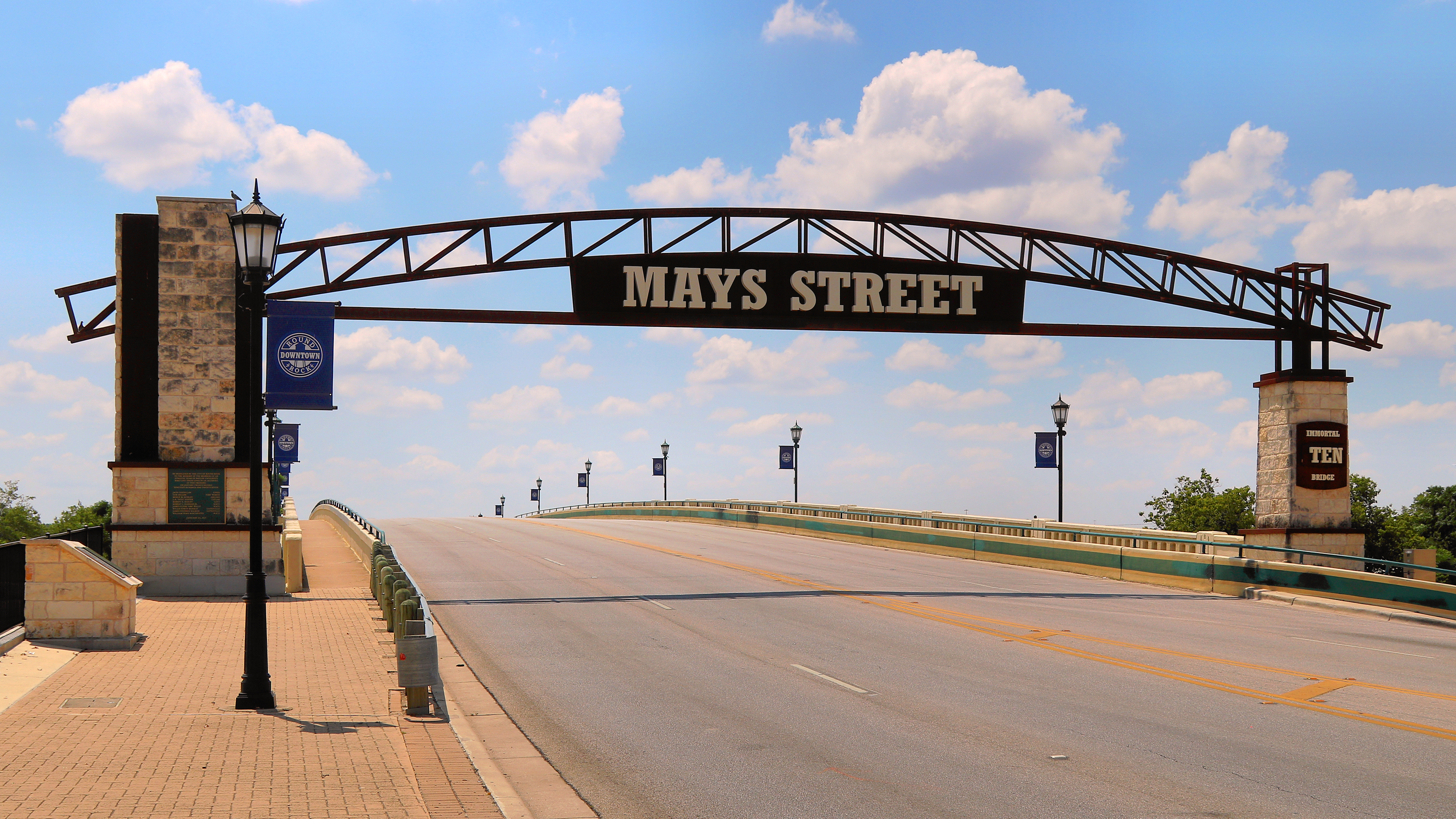
- Coordinates: 30.506693°N 97.678102°W
- Crosses: Union Pacific Railroad and E McNeil Rd
- Locale: Round Rock, Texas, United States
- Official name: South Mays Street Bridge

Characteristics
- Material: Concrete T-beam
- Total length: 451.1 ft (137.5 m)
- Width: 51.2 ft (15.6 m)
- No. of lanes: 4

History
- Opened: 1935
- Rebuilt: 1995 (rehabilitated)

The Immortal Ten Bridge is a bridge in Round Rock, Texas, United States built at the intersection of Mays St and the railroad in response to the January 22, 1927 crash of a passenger train into a bus carrying the Baylor University basketball team headed to a game at The University of Texas, which killed 10 of the 22 passengers. The accident spurred the use of overpasses to improve safety with the bridge being the first railroad overpass in Texas. Union Pacific donated $100,000 (equivalent to $2,290,000 in 2024) toward the bridge, completed in 1935.
