= Derby Street-Grand Trunk Western Railroad Bridge =

- U.S. National Register of Historic Places
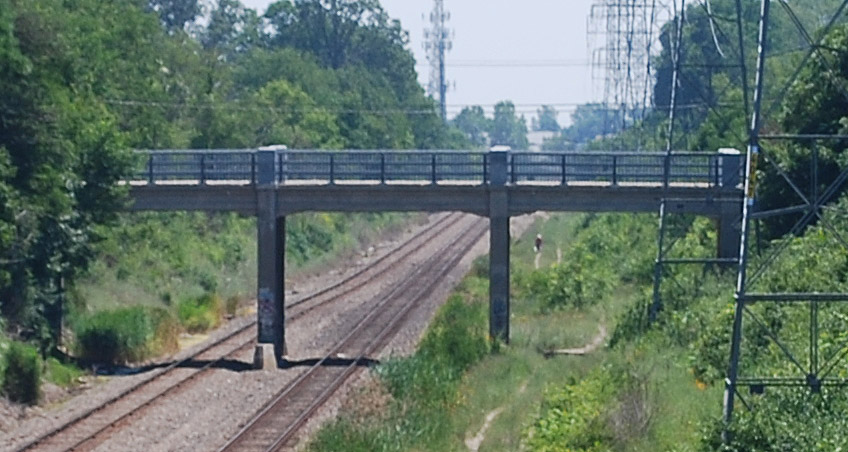
- Interactive map
- Location: Derby St. over GTW Railroad, Birmingham, Michigan
- Coordinates: 42°33′15″N 83°12′11″W
- Area: less than one acre
- Built: 1930
- Built by: A. Guthrie & Company
- Architect: Grand Trunk Railroad
- Architectural style: concrete T-beam
- MPS: Highway Bridges of Michigan MPS
- NRHP reference No.: 99001730
- Added to NRHP: January 27, 2000

The Derby Street-Grand Trunk Western Railroad Bridge is a bridge carrying Derby Street over the Grand Trunk Western Railroad in Birmingham, Michigan. It was listed on the National Register of Historic Places in 2000.

== History ==
In the late 1910s, there was significant pressure to upgrade Woodward Avenue, a major artery carrying traffic from Detroit to Pontiac. In response, the road commissions of Wayne, Oakland and Macomb Counties and the affected municipalities created a regional master plan for improvements. In 1923, the state agreed to share in some of the cost of improving the infrastructure. The state led the effort to secure a right-of-way along the Woodward corridor; one of the major impediments was the existence of the Grand Trunk Western Railroad track paralleling Woodward.

After protracted legal wrangling, the railroad and the state came to an agreement, and the tracks were shifted to a new location. As part of the new construction, a series of bridges were designed by the railroad to carry street over the new tracks. Sixteen bridges, including this one carrying Derby Street, were built by A. Guthrie & Company of St. Paul, Minnesota in 1930. The bridge was extensively renovated in 1980, and still carries traffic. Further repair was completed in 2007. The former GTW tracks currently serve as Canadian National Railway's Holly Subdivision.

== Description ==
The Derby Street Bridge is a five-span concrete T-beam bridge. It is 165 feet long with a 43.2-foot wide deck. It carries a 29.8-foot-wide roadway. The railings are solid concrete, ornamented with three recessed panels per span and curving outward at each end. The construction date, "1930," is inscribed in the concrete near the ends of the railings. The abutments, wing walls, and piers are all of concrete construction.

== See also ==
- National Register of Historic Places listings in Oakland County, Michigan

== Gallery ==
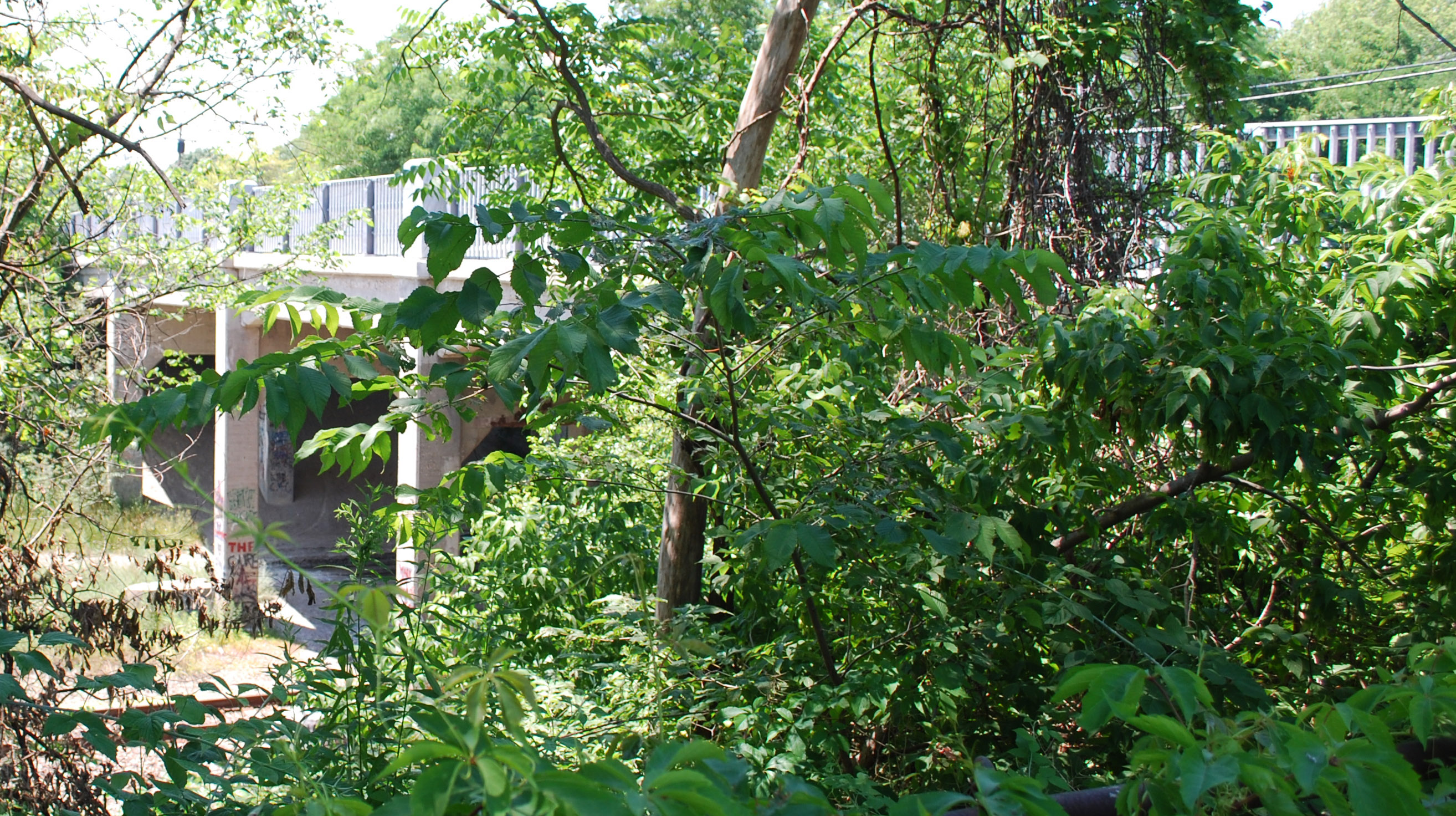

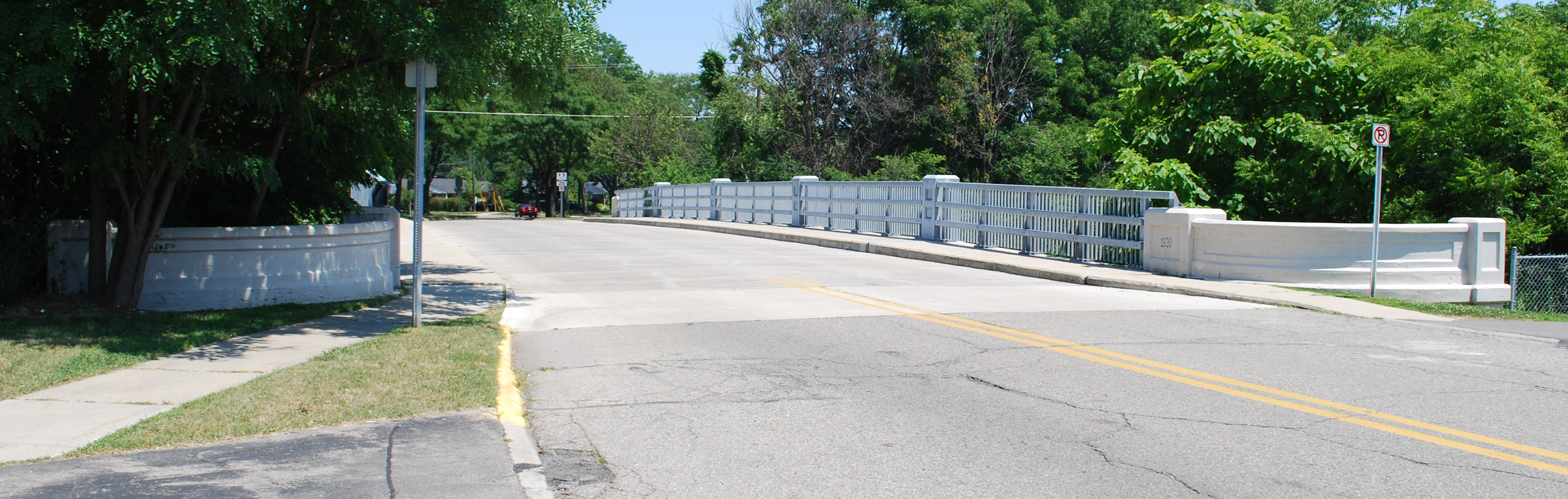
