= Trowbridge Road-Grand Trunk Western Railroad Bridge =

- Formerly listed on the U.S. National Register of Historic Places
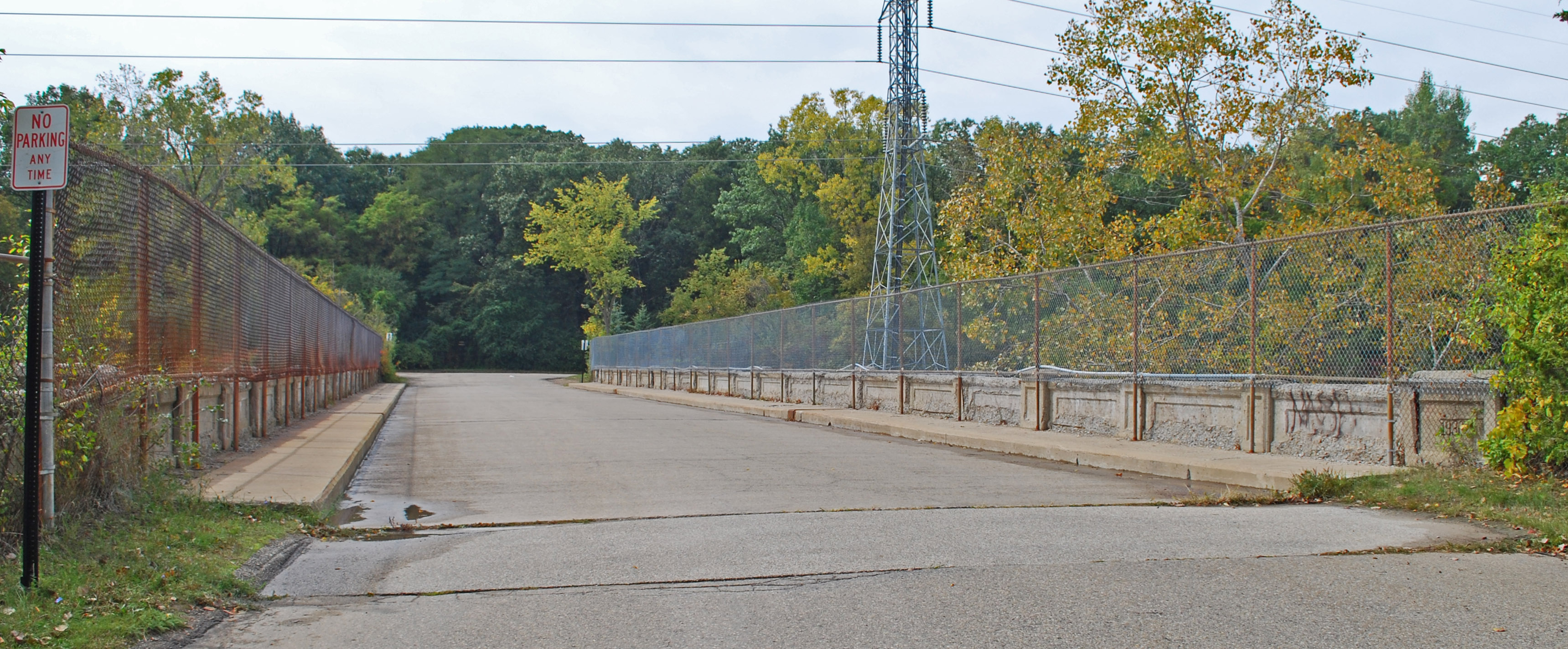
- Interactive map
- Location: Trowbridge Rd. over GTW Railroad, Bloomfield Hills, Michigan
- Coordinates: 42°34′50″N 83°13′51″W
- Area: less than one acre
- Built: 1931
- Built by: A. Guthrie and Company
- Architect: Grand Trunk Railroad
- Architectural style: Concrete continuous T-beam
- Demolished: c. 2019
- MPS: Highway Bridges of Michigan MPS
- NRHP reference No.: 00000010

Significant dates
- Added to NRHP: January 28, 2000
- Removed from NRHP: June 10, 2023

The Trowbridge Road-Grand Trunk Western Railroad Bridge was a bridge carrying Trowbridge Road over the Grand Trunk Western Railroad in Bloomfield Hills, Michigan. It was listed on the National Register of Historic Places in 2000 and removed in 2023.

== History ==
In the late 1910s, there was significant pressure to upgrade Woodward Avenue, a major artery carrying traffic from Detroit to Pontiac. In response, the road commissions of Wayne, Oakland and Macomb Counties and the affected municipalities created a regional master plan for improvements. In 1923, the state agreed to share in some of the cost of improving the infrastructure. The state led the effort to secure a right-of-way along the Woodward corridor; one of the major impediments was the existence of the Grand Trunk Western Railroad track paralleling Woodward.

After protracted legal wrangling, the railroad and the state came to an agreement, and the tracks were shifted to a new location. As part of the new construction, a series of bridges were designed by the railroad to carry street over the new tracks. Sixteen bridges were built by A. Guthrie & Company of St. Paul, Minnesota in 1930, but the Trowbridge Road bridge was not completed until 1931.

The bridge was closed in 2017, and as of 2019 was slated for demolition. The bridge was later demolished, and subsequently removed from the National Register.

== Description ==
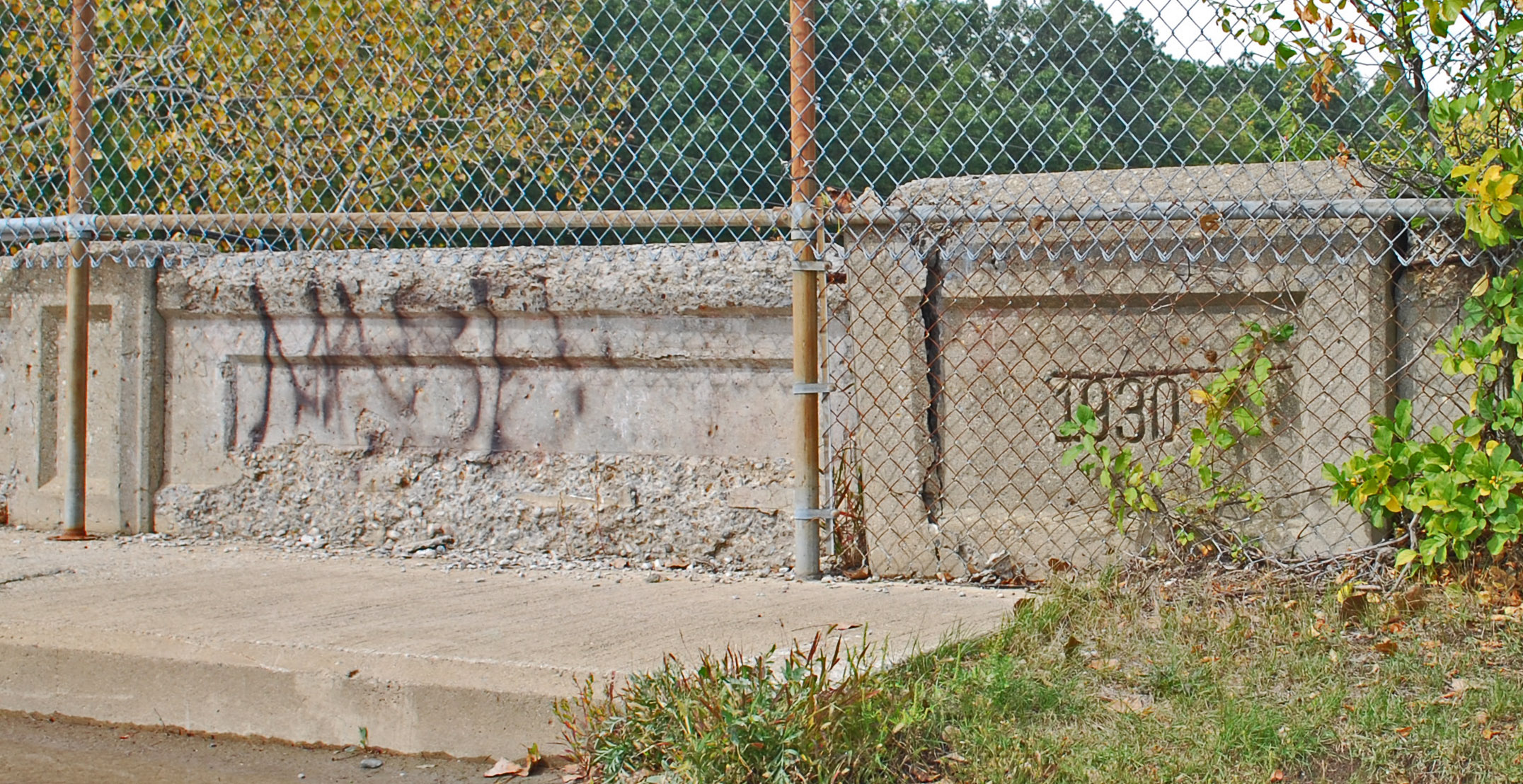
End of parapet

The Trowbridge Road bridge was a seven span, concrete T-beam structure. It was 231 feet long, with a 44-foot-wide deck carrying a 30-foot-wide roadway. It had false concrete arches with recessed panels in the spandrels. The railings were solid concrete parapets with paneled concrete posts and three recessed rectangular panels between each. The date "1930" was chiseled into the parapets at each end. The ends curved out before terminating in concrete posts, and chain-link fencing lined the inside of the railing.

== See also ==
- National Register of Historic Places listings in Oakland County, Michigan
