= Thomson Road–Air Line Railroad Bridge =

- U.S. National Register of Historic Places
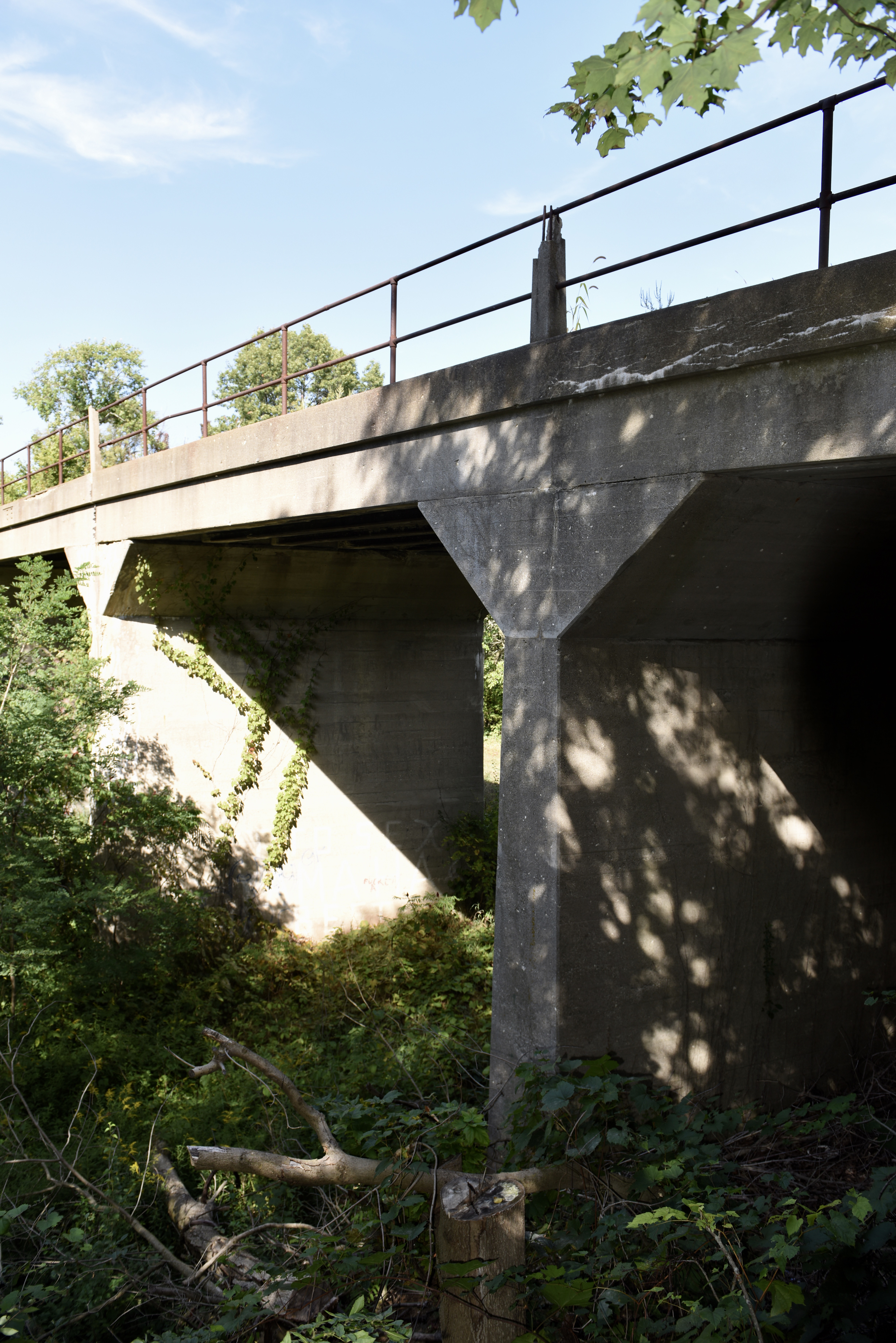

- Location within Michigan Location within the United States
- Interactive map
- Location: Thomson Rd. over abandoned RR right-of-way, Howard Township, Michigan
- Coordinates: 41°52′53″N 86°11′41″W
- Area: less than one acre
- Built: 1919
- Architectural style: concrete T-beam
- MPS: Highway Bridges of Michigan MPS
- NRHP reference No.: 99001612
- Added to NRHP: December 22, 1999

The Thomson Road–Air Line Railroad Bridge, also known as just the Thomson Road Bridge, is a bridge located on Thomson Road over the abandoned Michigan Air Line Railroad right-of-way in Howard Township, Michigan. It was listed on the National Register of Historic Places in 1999. It is one of the oldest examples of a concrete T-beam bridge in Michigan, and has a rare brick deck.

== History ==
The main line of the Michigan Central Railroad, located about .5 miles (0.80 km) west of this site, was constructed through Cass County in 1848. Just after the Civil War, a new rail line known as the Michigan Air Line Railroad was constructed, linking Jackson with the Michigan Central line at Niles; two years later, the route was controlled by the Michigan Central. In 1919, a cutoff was constructed through Howard Township, linking the main Michigan Central line to the Airline. This bridge was constructed at the same time, probably from a design developed by the railroad company.

The railroad beneath the bridge has been abandoned for many years and is overgrown.

== Description ==
The Thomson Road–Air Line Railroad Bridge is one of the oldest examples of a concrete T-beam bridge in Michigan, and the only historically significant bridge of the type having multiple spans. The entire bridge is 169 feet (52 m) long and just over 20 feet (6.1 m) in width, with five spans of 35 feet (11 m) in length. The length of the structure is due to the wide right-of-way beneath, which was used as a railroad switchyard known as the "Hump." The bridge has an unusual brick deck, which has a slight arch. The original bridge railings are metal pipe panels strung between concrete posts. The bridge has maintained an excellent integrity.
