= Union Pacific Bridge =

Union Pacific Bridge may refer to:

- Blair Bridge (Union Pacific Railroad), across the Missouri River between Blair, Nebraska and Harrison County, Iowa
- St. Joseph Union Pacific Bridge, crossing the Missouri River between St. Joseph, Missouri, and Elwood, Kansas
- St. Paul Union Pacific Rail Bridge, crossing the Mississippi River between Saint Paul and South Saint Paul, Minnesota
- St. Paul Union Pacific Vertical-lift Rail Bridge, crossing the Mississippi River in St. Paul, Minnesota
- Union Pacific International Railway Bridge, crossing the Rio Grande between Laredo, Texas, and Nuevo Laredo, Tamaulipas
- Union Pacific International Railroad Bridge (Eagle Pass–Piedras Negras), crossing the Rio Grande between Eagle Pass, Texas and Piedras Negras, Coahuila, Mexico
- Union Pacific Missouri River Bridge, crossing the Missouri River between Council Bluffs, Iowa and Omaha, Nebraska
