= Banning Railroad Bridge =

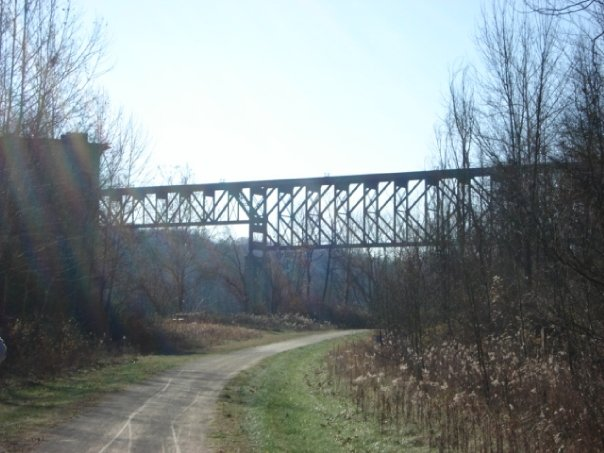
- View from the Yough River Trail
- Coordinates: 40.1239°N 79.7480°W
- Carries: Wheeling and Lake Erie Railway
- Crosses: Youghiogheny River
- Locale: Perry Township, Fayette County, Pennsylvania

Characteristics
- Design: truss bridge
- Total length: 1,582 feet (482 m)
- Width: 28 feet (8.5 m)

History
- Opened: 1930

The Banning Railroad Bridge is a structure that carries the Wheeling and Lake Erie Railway across the Youghiogheny River in Perry Township, Fayette County, Pennsylvania.

The bridge was constructed in 1930 by the American Bridge Company as part of the major railroad to be built in Pennsylvania. Like the Speers Railroad Bridge along the same route, the structure uses a "K-truss" design that is extremely uncommon outside of the Great Plains states. Although once part of a critical connection between the Pittsburgh industrial region and the Western Maryland Railroad, today the bridge sees light traffic and is mainly used for the transportation of coal.
