= Chicago & North Western Railway Stone Arch Bridge =

- U.S. National Register of Historic Places
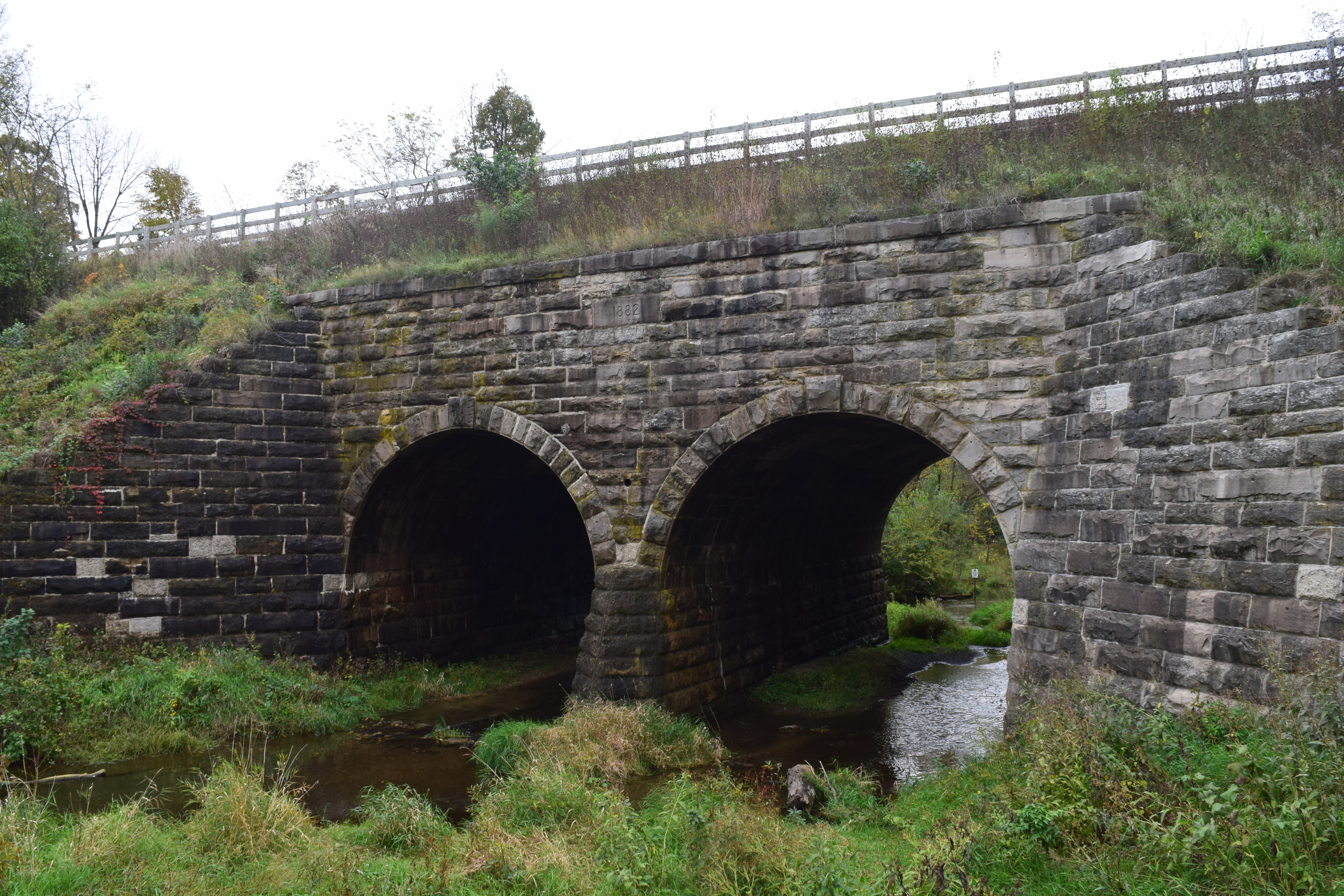

- Location within Illinois
- Location: 0.6 miles (0.97 km) east of Illinois Route 251, 0.6 miles (0.97 km) west of Interstate 90 and 0.2 miles (0.32 km) south of Burr Oak Road
- Nearest city: Roscoe, Illinois
- Coordinates: 42°24′57″N 88°59′51″W
- Area: less than one acre
- Built: 1882
- Built by: Mienen, Van; Chicago & North Western Railway
- Architectural style: Stone arch bridge
- NRHP reference No.: 93000840
- Added to NRHP: August 19, 1993

The Chicago & North Western Railway Stone Arch Bridge, also known as the Kinnikinnick Creek Railway Bridge, is a historic Chicago and North Western Railway bridge that crosses South Kinnikinnick Creek east of Roscoe, Illinois. The bridge was built in 1882 to replace a wooden bridge; the line it was on opened in 1853 as part of the Galena and Chicago Union Railroad and originally connected Belvidere, Illinois and Beloit, Wisconsin. C&NW Chief Engineer Van Mienen designed the double arch dolomitic limestone bridge, which is 53 feet (16 m) long, 60 feet (18 m) wide, and 58 feet (18 m) high. The railroad allowed the sand quarrying industry in Roscoe and South Beloit to ship its products to construction sites in Chicago; the bridge is one of the few surviving remnants of the railroad in Roscoe. The bridge is the only stone-faced rubble fill bridge with more than one arch in Winnebago County; the nearest bridge of the type is a five-arch bridge in Tiffany, Wisconsin.

The bridge was added to the National Register of Historic Places on August 19, 1993. It is now part of the Stone Bridge Trail, a rail trail built along the former railway.
