= Gauja River Railway Bridge =

Railway bridge in Latvia

Coordinates: 57°36′57″N 25°39′18″E

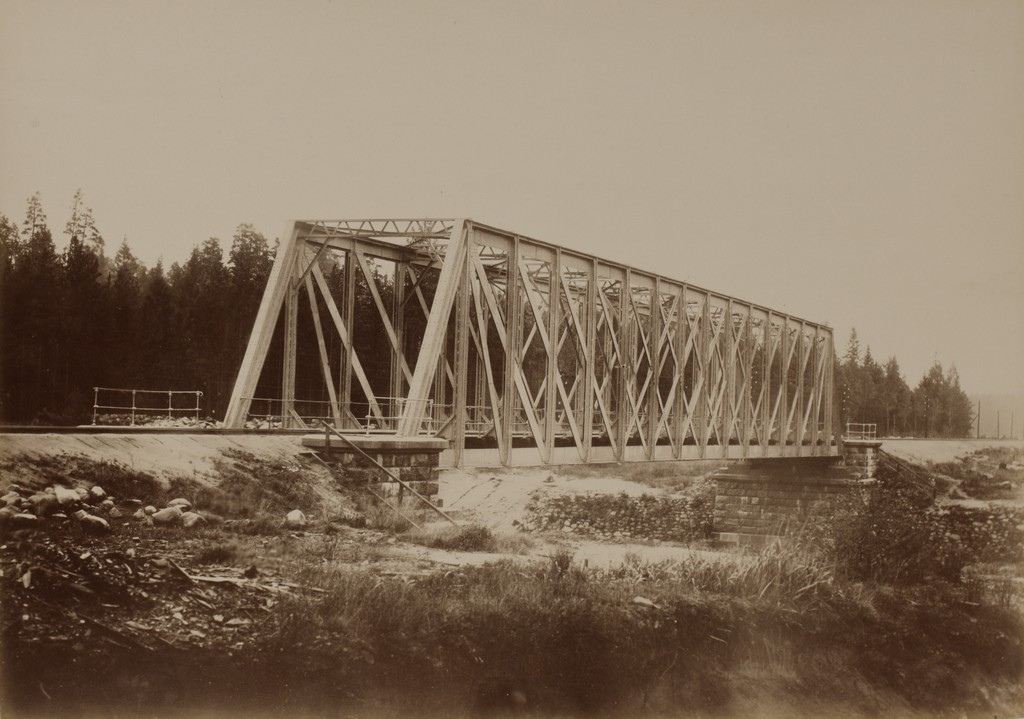
The bridge seen in August 1889

The Gauja River Railway Bridge crosses the Gauja River in Ūdriņi, Latvia as part of the Riga–Valka–Pskov railway line. It was opened around 1889.

Where the bridge crosses the river there are small rapids named "Strenču", containing six steps, which can be navigated using canoes.
