= Meschio Railway Bridge =

Italian railway bridge

The Meschio Railway Bridge is a riveted railway bridge built in 1918. It is located on the Venice–Udine railway, in the northeast of Italy. The 1918 structure was taken out of service in 2006, then dismantled. The main beams were taken to the Structural Laboratory of Padua University for engineering studies.

== Technical Details ==
The main horizontal structure has a 12.40 m (40 ft 8 in) net span. It has an open deck made of twinned riveted composite flanged girders, 865 mm (34.1 in) wide and 838 mm (33.0 in) in height. The railway track over the bridge was composed of wooden beams recessed between coupled girders, with each twinned girder supporting the wooden elements that held a single rail.
