= Fenglingdu Yellow River Railway Bridge =

Railway bridge in China

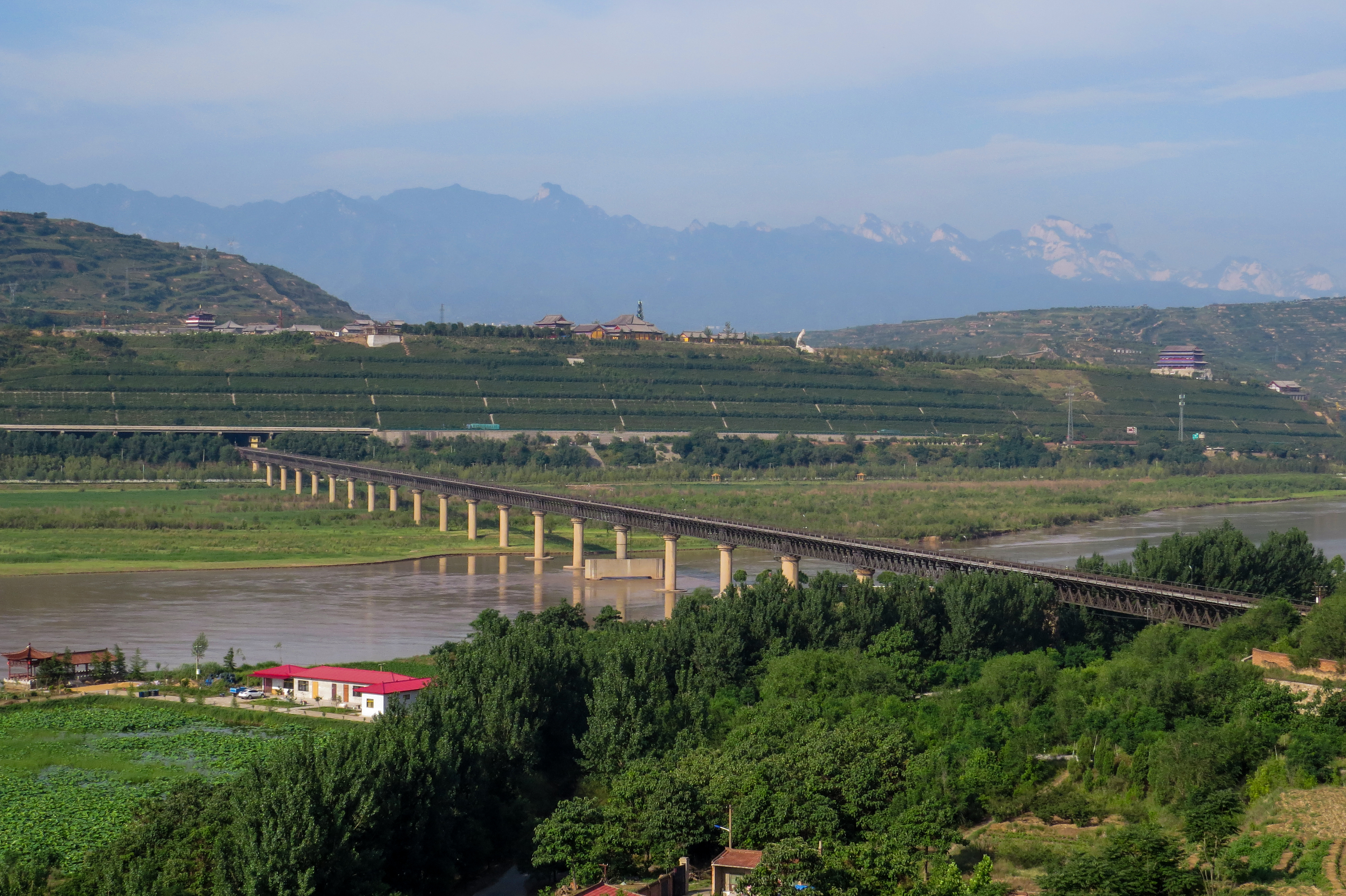
The bridge in 2017

The Fenglingdu Yellow River Railway Bridge (Chinese: 黄河风陵渡铁路桥) is a single-track railway bridge over the Yellow River. It joins Shanxi and Shaanxi and carries the Datong–Puzhou railway.

== History ==
The bridge was completed in 1970.

During 2019, the bridge was closed to allow renovation work to take place. The bridge deck was replaced and the line was electrified. The maximum speed was raised from 25 kilometres per hour (16 mph) to 85 kilometres per hour (53 mph). It reopened on 30 December 2019.
