= CPR Bridge =

CPR Bridge may refer to:

- CPR Bridge (Saskatoon), Saskatchewan
- Siska CPR Bridge, Siska, British Columbia
- Parry Sound CPR Trestle, Parry Sound, Ontario
