= Guang River Railway bridge =

Guang River Railway bridge สะพานข้ามแม่น้ำกวง
- Coordinates: 18.542911°N 98.968713°E
- Carries: 1 Railway track
- Crosses: Guang River
- Locale: Lamphun Province
- Official name: Guang River Railway bridge
- Maintained by: State Railway of Thailand

Characteristics
- Design: Truss bridge

History
- Constructed by: FRODINCHAM IRON & STEEL Co., Ltd. ENGLAND

Location
- Interactive map of Guang River Railway bridge

Guang River Railway bridge (Thai: สะพานข้ามแม่น้ำกวง) is a three-span railway bridge in Thailand. It is situated near the Town of Lamphun, Lamphun Province on the Northern Line Railway. There are three span. Crossings Guang River. There are two road bridges beside this bridge.

== Features ==
It is a three-span truss bridge.
