= Arthur Kill Railroad Bridge =

Arthur Kill Railroad Bridge may refer to one of two railroad bridges between Elizabethport, New Jersey and Staten Island, New York:

- Arthur Kill Bridge, from 1888 until 1959
- Arthur Kill Vertical Lift Bridge, from 1959 to present
