= Chakri Railway bridge =

Chakri Railway bridge สะพานจักรี
- Carries: 2 Railway track (separated)
- Crosses: Pa Sak River
- Locale: Phra Nakhon Si Ayutthaya Province
- Official name: Chakri Railway bridge
- Maintained by: State Railway of Thailand

Characteristics
- Design: Truss bridge
- Total length: 103.00 metres (1st track) ? (2nd track)

History
- Constructed by: YOKOGAWA BRIDGE WORK
- Opened: 1948 (1st track); 2004 (2nd track)

Chakri Railway bridge is a three-span railway bridge in Thailand, with the parallel bridge. It is situated in Phra Nakhon Si Ayutthaya Province on the Northern Line Railway. There are three span, length 103 metres. The parallel bridge is three-span bridge too.

== Features ==
It is a three-span truss bridge. Its length is 103 metres. The parallel bridge is three-span bridge too.
