= Vyšehrad railway bridge =

Vyšehrad railway bridge Vyšehradský železniční most
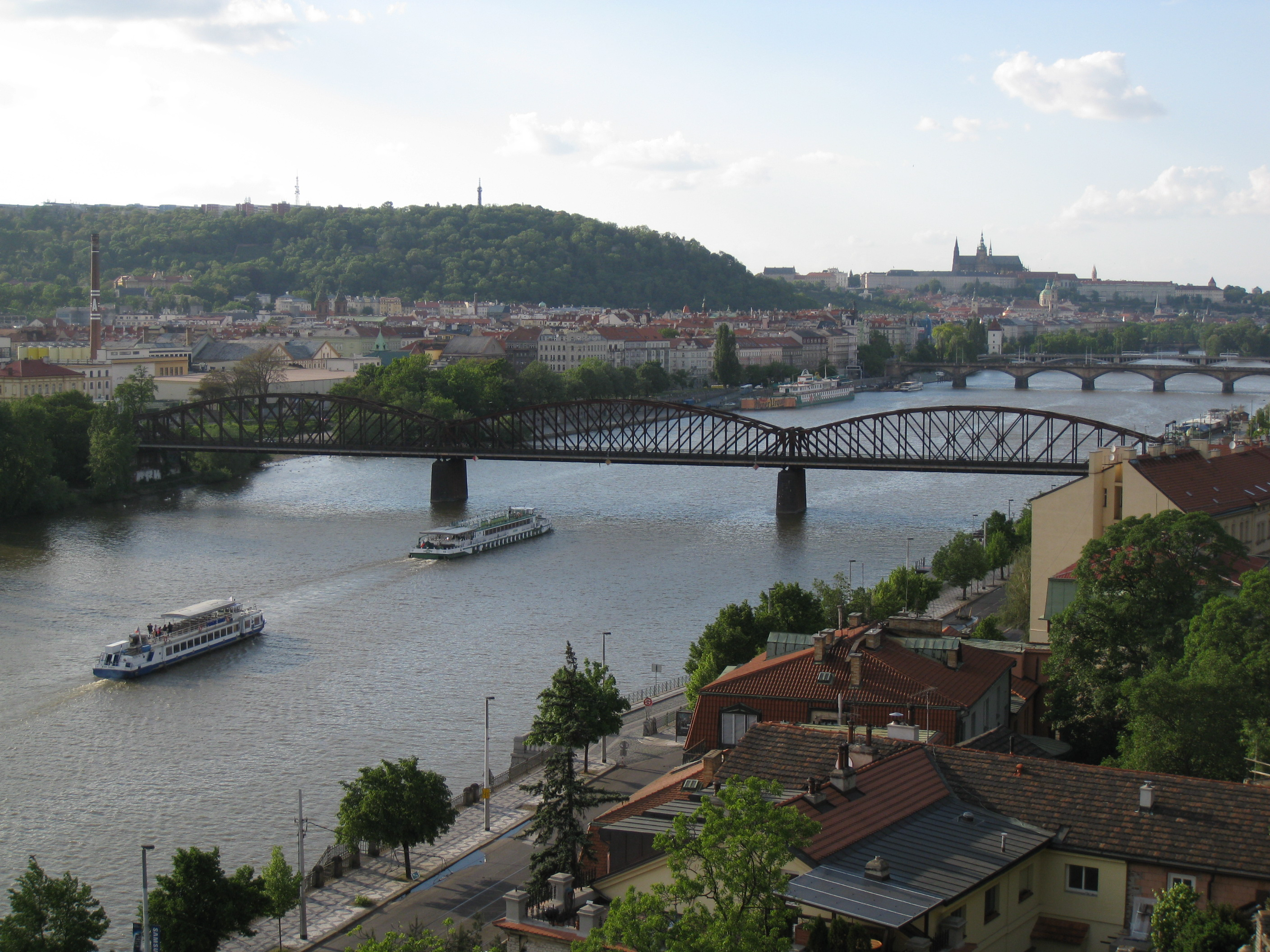
- The bridge in 2012
- Coordinates: 50°04′01″N 14°24′48″E
- Crosses: Vltava
- Locale: Prague, Czech Republic

History
- Opened: 1872
- Rebuilt: 1901

Location
- Interactive map of Vyšehrad railway bridge

Vyšehrad Railway Bridge (Czech: Vyšehradský železniční most) is a bridge in Prague, Czech Republic. It was built in 1872 and rebuilt in 1901, linking the Nusle Valley with Smíchov.

The pedestrian site footbridges of the bridge were closed in December 2017 due to safety concerns regarding its state. Reconstruction is scheduled to take place in the summer of 2018 and 2019.
