= Belle Isle railroad bridge =

- Coordinates: 37°31′42″N 77°27′10″W
- Carries: Richmond and Danville Railroad
- Crosses: James River
- Locale: Manchester, Virginia and Richmond, Virginia

Characteristics
- Design: trestle bridge

History
- Opened: 1872
- Closed: 1948

Location
- Interactive map of Belle Isle railroad bridge

The Belle Isle railroad bridge was a bridge that carried a spur of the Richmond and Danville Railroad across the James River and Belle Isle in Richmond, Virginia. It was built in 1872 to haul iron from the Old Dominion Iron and Nail Works mills on Belle Isle and the Tredegar Ironworks on the north side of the James. The line ran from the R & D in northwest Manchester and immediately started across a railroad trestle bridge to Belle Isle and the Old Dominion Works and onto the Tredegar works. From Tredegar, the railroad line ran east to intersect with the Richmond and Petersburg Railroad.

This bridge was burnt in 1909 and its remnants were finally removed in 1948 because they were a fire hazard.
