= Dömitz Railway Bridge =

Former railway bridge in Germany

Coordinates: 53°07′52″N 11°14′44″E

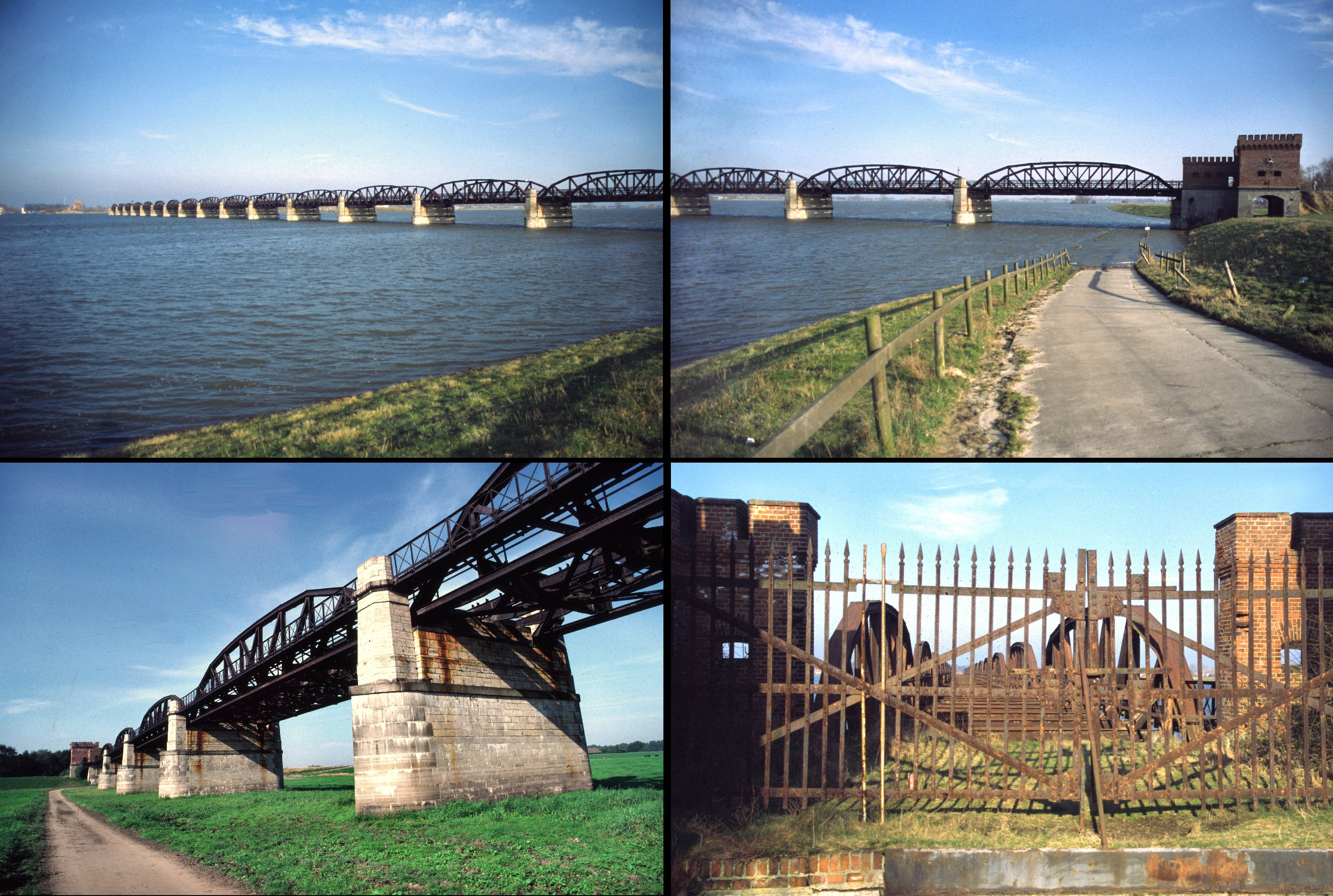
Montage of various sections of the bridge.

The Dömitz Railway Bridge is a partially complete railway bridge over the Elbe River near the town of Dömitz, Germany. As constructed, it had a length of 1,000 metres and was the longest railway bridge in Germany at that time (in 1873). It was part of the Wittenberge–Buchholz railway.

== History of the Bridge ==
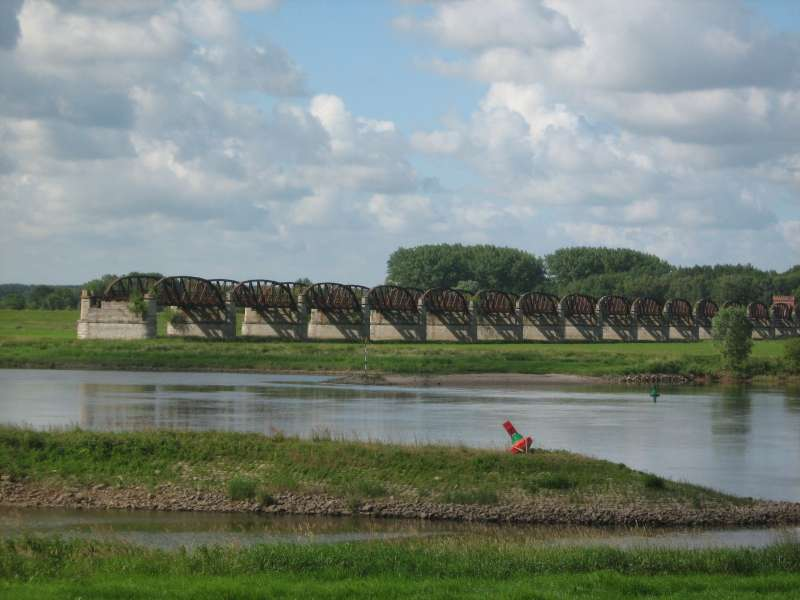
The bridge abruptly ends before it reaches the river. Beyond this point was destroyed during World War 2, and the other section was torn down by the East German government.

Construction on the bridge began on August 9, 1870, with main construction taking place 1870 and 1873. A well-fortified Bridge House was located at each end of the bridge, and it had towers with battlements and embrasures on both sides of the tracks. The foundations were vaulted in casemate-like form. Allied bombing destroyed the bridge on April 20, 1945, and the division of Germany after the war made repairs impossible as the ends of the bridge were located in East Germany and West Germany. The East German government tore down what remained of the bridge on their side of the border in 1987. 550 meters (600 yards) of the bridge are still standing in the former West Germany; this portion of the bridge's arches are under historic preservation orders.

The western portion of the bridge was owned by Deutsche Bahn until it was sold at auction in 2010 to a Dutch real estate firm for €305,000, that plans to preserve the bridge.
