= Nyköping Railway Bridge =

Coordinates: 58°45′28″N 17°00′16″E

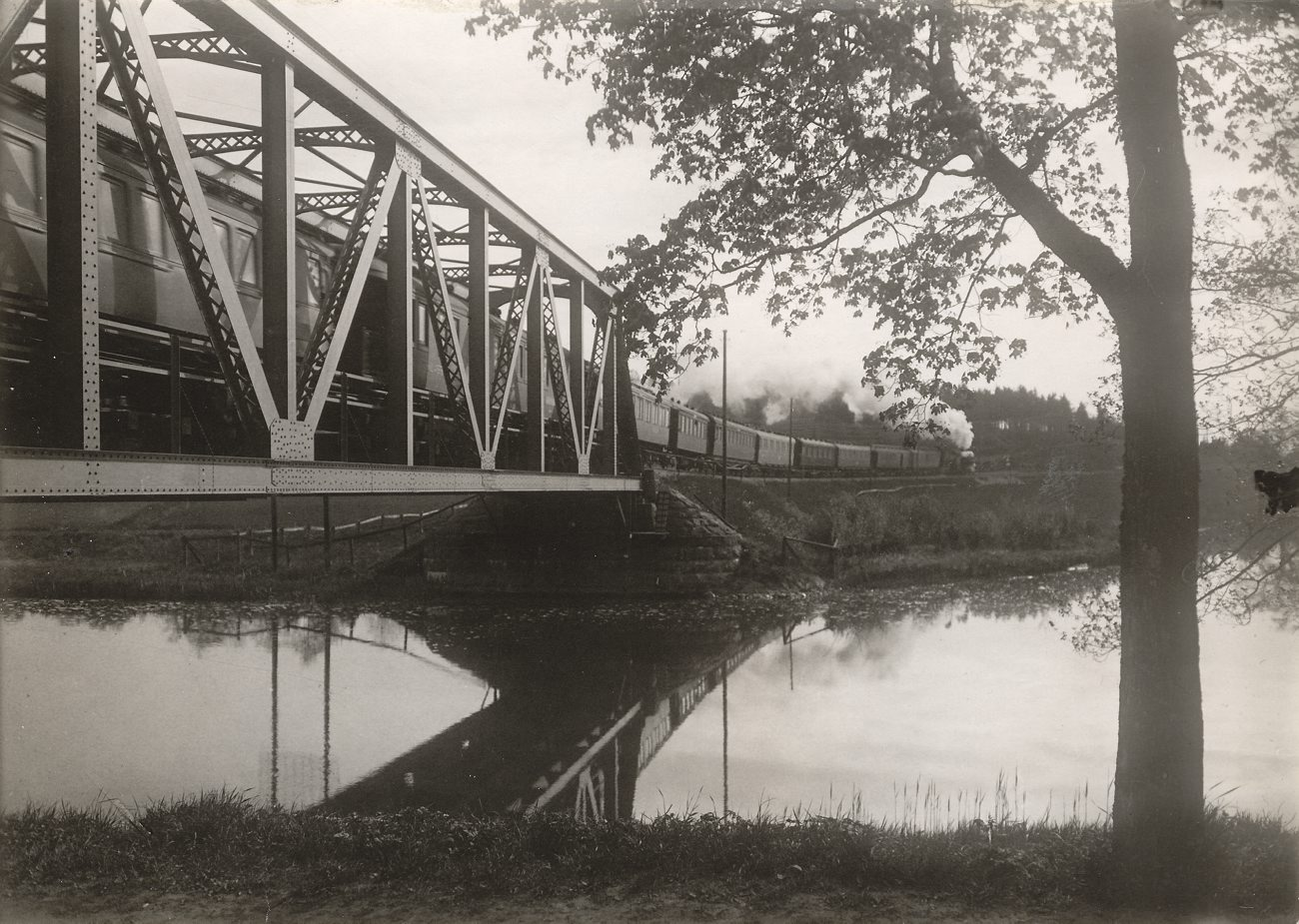
The old bridge, circa 1920

The Nyköping Railway Bridge spans the river Nyköpingsån in Nyköping, Sweden.

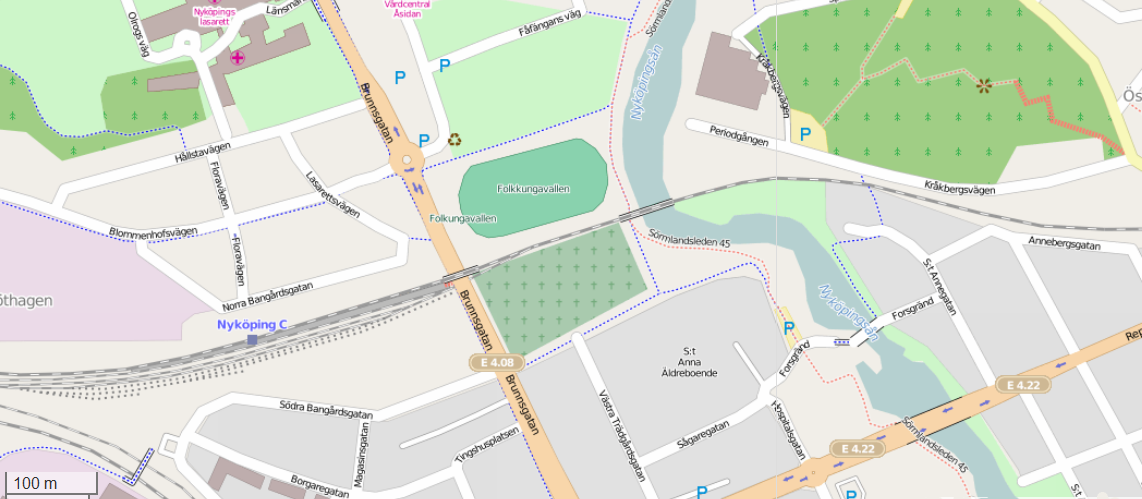
Map showing the bridge over the river. The Nyköping C Railway Station is at the left.

The original 200 tonne bridge was replaced with a new 320 tonne bridge on 11 August 2008. The new bridge is 51m long, 8m wide and 9m tall. The former century-old bridge was lifted out using a boom crane and the new bridge was then put into place using the same crane. The process took 10 minutes. With the new bridge, speed on the rail line can be raised from 30 km/h to 130 km/h.
