= Pennsylvania Railroad Bridge (Columbia, Pennsylvania) =

Bridge in the United States

- Coordinates: 40.0293°N 76.5179°W
- Carries: railroad tracks and two-lane automobile roadway
- Crosses: Susquehanna River
- Locale: York County, Pennsylvania and Lancaster County, Pennsylvania
- Other name(s): Columbia-Wrightsville Bridge
- Maintained by: Pennsylvania Railroad

Characteristics
- Design: prefabricated open-air steel trusses
- Total length: 5,375 feet
- Longest span: equal 200-foot (61 m) sections
- Clearance below: 14 feet above flood stage

History
- Opened: 1896
- Closed: 1963

Statistics
- Toll: varied by vehicle type

The Pennsylvania Railroad Bridge once carried the York Branch of the Pennsylvania Railroad across the Susquehanna River between Columbia and Wrightsville, Pennsylvania, and is therefore considered a Columbia-Wrightsville Bridge. It and its predecessors were a vital commercial and passenger linkage between Philadelphia and Baltimore for over 100 years.

== Earlier bridges on the site ==
Several bridges have been built on the site, with the first wooden covered bridge erected in the early 1830s to replace a nearby smaller toll bridge immediately upriver that had been destroyed by ice. Set on 26 stone piers, the new massive oaken structure was the longest covered bridge in the world (over a mile and a quarter in length). It used timber salvaged from the previous bridge and provided a link for the Philadelphia and Columbia Railroad to the Northern Central Railway, as well as for carriages, pedestrians and wagons. A towpath on the southern wall enabled teams of horses or mules to pull boats from the Mainline Canal on the Columbia side to the Tidewater and Susquehanna Canal on the Wrightsville side.

This bridge was burned by state militia under Col. Jacob G. Frick and Maj. Granville O. Haller on June 28, 1863, to block elements of the Confederate States Army under Brig. Gen. John Brown Gordon from crossing into Lancaster County shortly before the Battle of Gettysburg. For the rest of the war, cargo and passengers had to be laboriously ferried across the broad Susquehanna River.

The Columbia Bridge Company constructed another wooden bridge on the same stone piers in the years just after the Civil War, restoring the railroad line. The Pennsylvania Railroad purchased this replacement bridge in 1879, but it was destroyed by a severe windstorm in 1896. These bridges were each known as the "Columbia-Wrightsville Bridge."

== Pennsylvania Railroad Bridge ==
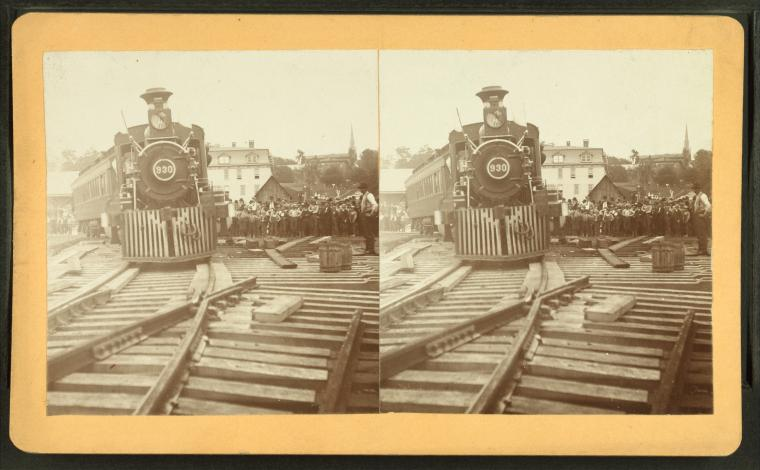
First train across the new bridge.

The last bridge on the site was built in 1896, just 29 days after the destruction of the previous wooden bridge. A steel truss bridge made of 200-foot (61 m) long prefabricated sections, it carried a single railroad track for the Pennsylvania Railroad, as well as a two-lane roadway. It was designed to be resistant to fire, floods, and ice, elements that had destroyed previous wooden structures. Like the previous bridges, tolls were collected for passage to recover a portion of the half million dollar investment.

As originally envisioned, the new bridge was to have had two decks, the bottom one for trains and the upper for other traffic. The top deck was never added, and freight and passenger trains shared the planked lower deck with carriages, wagons, and [later] with automobiles and trucks crossing the river on the Lincoln Highway.

In 1930, automobile traffic was rerouted to the newly constructed Veterans Memorial Bridge, just downstream. The steel bridge reverted to only being used by the railroad, although usage eventually diminished considerably as commercial truck traffic on the Veterans Memorial Bridge (then part of US 30) increased. The track was removed and the bridge dismantled in 1963. The stone piers are still present in the river. A historical marker now commemorates the history of the bridge.
