= Baltimore & Ohio Railroad Bridge, Antietam Creek =

- B & O Bridge
- U.S. National Register of Historic Places
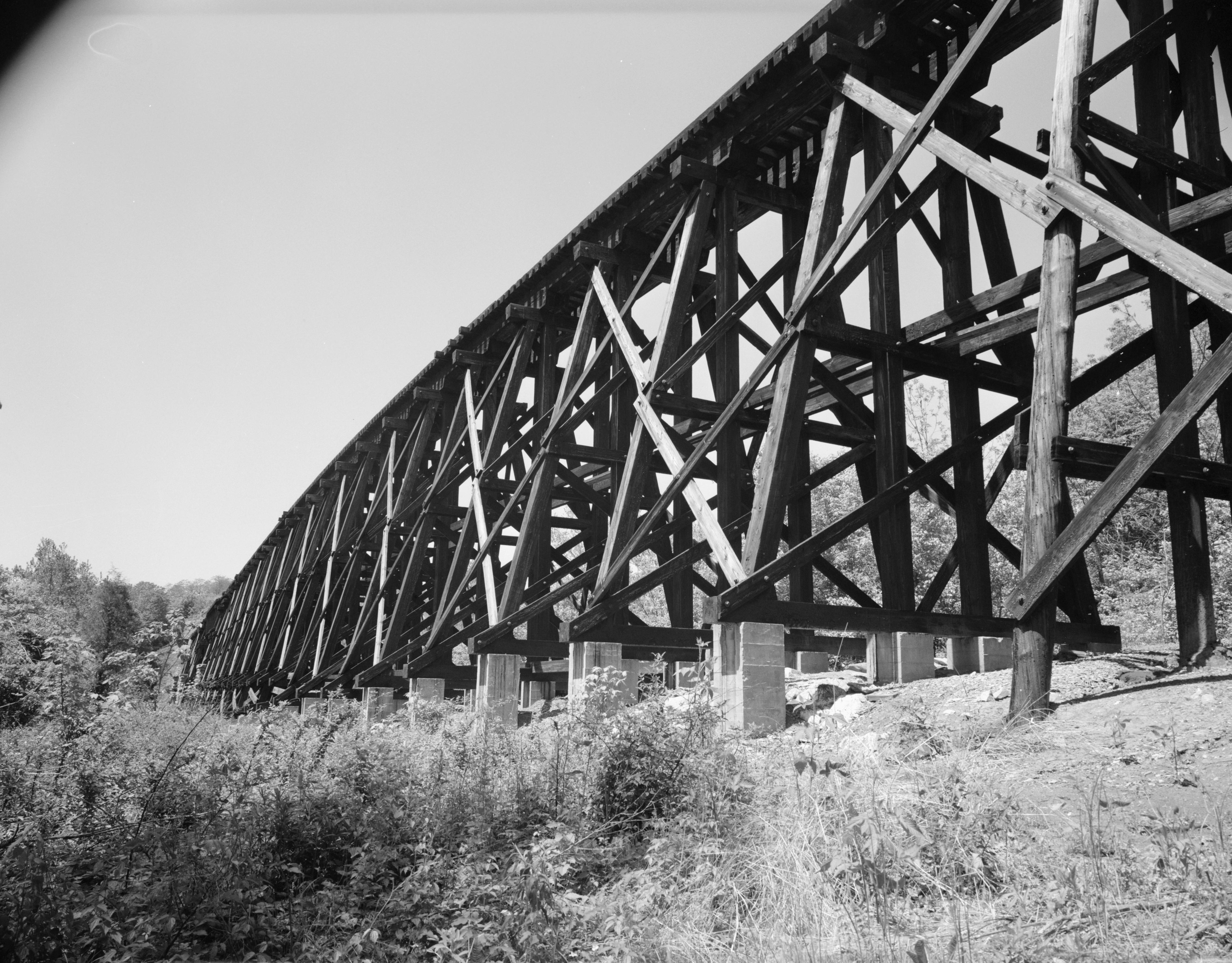

- Location within Maryland Location within the United States
- Nearest city: Keedysville, Maryland
- Coordinates: 39°30′15″N 77°42′50″W
- Area: 4 acres (1.6 ha)
- Built: 1867
- NRHP reference No.: 77000704
- Added to NRHP: November 23, 1977

The Baltimore & Ohio Railroad Bridge, Antietam Creek was a timber trestle bridge near Keedysville, Washington County, Maryland, United States. It carried the Washington County branch of the Baltimore and Ohio Railroad, later part of CSX Transportation, over the ravine formed by the Antietam Creek northwest of Keedysville. The wooden bridge, constructed about 1867, was approximately 400 feet (120 m) in length and was supported by a series of timber bents resting on concrete sills. CSX abandoned the railroad line in the late 1970s or 1980s.

The bridge was listed on the National Register of Historic Places in 1977. The bridge was subsequently removed completely.

== See also ==
- List of bridges documented by the Historic American Engineering Record in Maryland
- List of bridges on the National Register of Historic Places in Maryland
