= St. Joseph Swing Bridge =

Railroad bridge between Kansas and Missouri, U.S.

Coordinates: 39.7534°N 94.85831°W

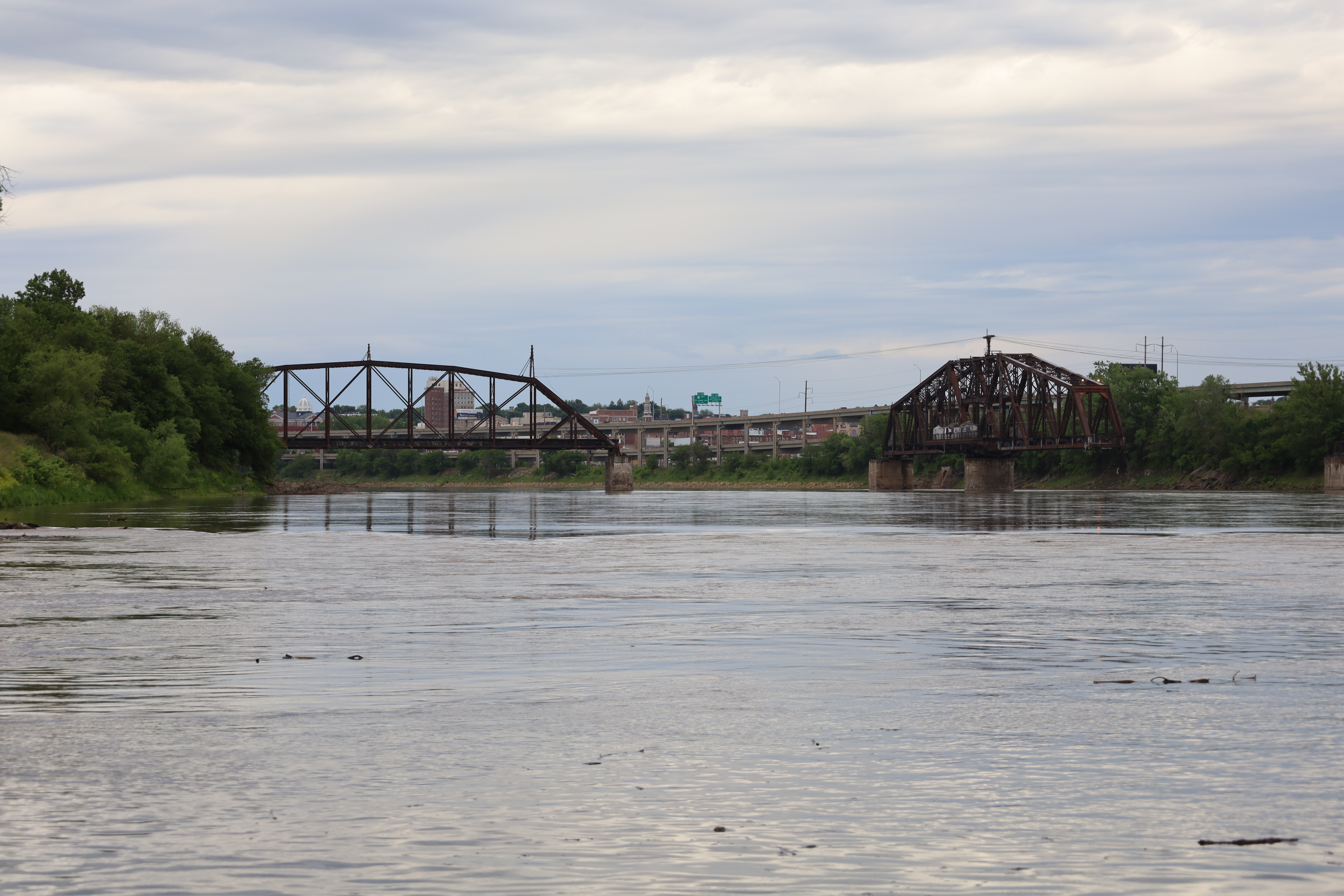
The bridge in 2025

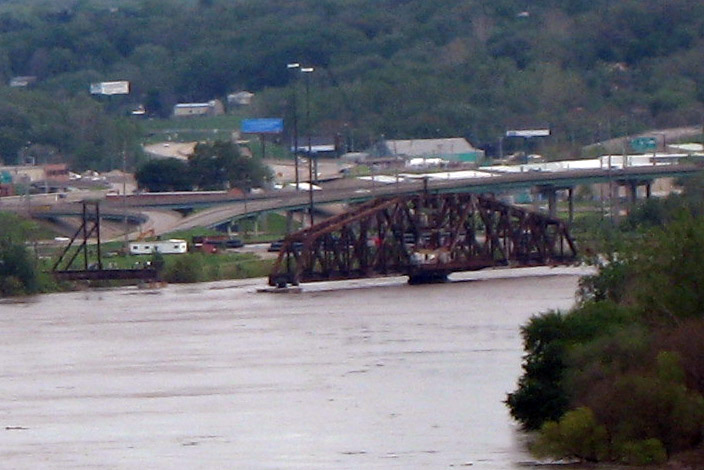
The Swing Bridge from the north in 2007. It is almost always in the "open" position.

The St. Joseph Swing Bridge (also known as the St. Joseph Union Pacific Bridge and the St. Joseph-Elwood Bridge) is a Union Pacific Railroad truss Swing bridge connecting St. Joseph, Missouri, and Elwood, Kansas.

== History ==
=== Original bridge ===
The first bridge on the location was built by the St. Joseph Bridge Building Company and cost $716,000 (of which St. Joseph had paid $500,000) and opened on May 20, 1873, with a crossing by the St. Joseph & Denver City Railroad. The original bridge had six piers with three spans of 300 feet, one fixed span of 80 feet on the east end and a draw span of 3,654 feet making the total span of 1,345 feet.

The opening of the bridge was reported:

This was beyond doubt the most brilliant pageant ever witnessed in the city. Not only was every civic association and benevolent society represented in the vast procession, but the German citizens of the north west had selected St. Joseph as the place for holding their annual Sangerfest on the same day. The procession which traversed the streets of St. Joseph, was never equaled west of the Mississippi. Every trade was represented. The cooper was hooping barrels in his improvised shop on wheels, the shoemaker was pegging at his last, the axhandle manufacturers were using their drawing knives, and turning out handles with the same celerity that marked their labors at home, lathes, looms, steam engines, collar factories, trunk establishments and an endless variety of other trades and appliances of mechanical labor, were in full blast, in the vast stream of human industry, that moved along the streets to the enlivening music of six or eight brass bands. The procession was fully six miles in length and both in the novelty of its character and the immensity of its magnitude, astonished even the people in whose midst the industries existed. At night hundreds of Chinese lanterns illuminated the structure.

On June 16, 1879, the bridge was transferred to Jay Gould and operated under the name of the St. Joseph & Grand Island Railroad Company (which was primarily used for the Union Pacific). The Atchison, Topeka and Santa Fe Railway and Chicago, Rock Island and Pacific Railroad also had trackage rights to the bridge.

The bridge still fell into disrepair and the city bonds were never paid off and it was sold to the bond holders for $5,000 in a foreclosure sale in 1901.

=== Current bridge ===
The bridge was replaced with the current swing bridge in 1906.

Union Pacific sold the bridge and its 108-mile line to Upland, Marshall County, Kansas, to Railtex in 1990 operating it as the Northeast Kansas and Missouri Railroad (NEKM). Union Pacific bought it back in 1998 to use for returning empty coal trains going from Missouri back to Wyoming. However, Union Pacific was interested primarily in the tracks from Hiawatha, Kansas, to Upland. It subsequently abandoned the tracks between Elwood and Hiawatha although it still keeps ownership of the bridge and small rail spur to the west side of Elwood. The swing bridge is usually left in the open position.

== See also ==
- List of crossings of the Missouri River
