= Speers Railroad Bridge =

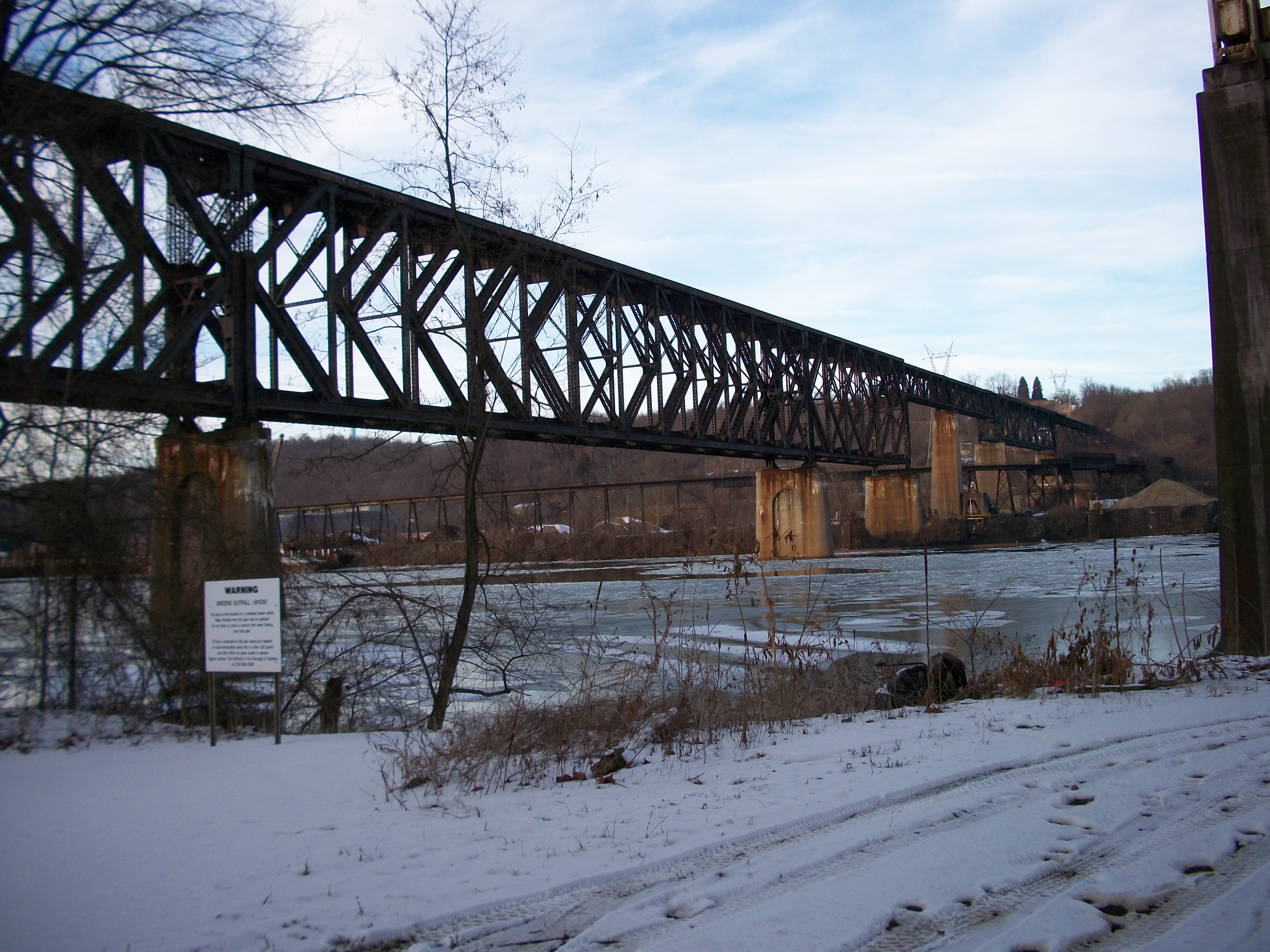
- Coordinates: 40.12751°N 79.87914°W
- Carries: Wheeling and Lake Erie Railway
- Crosses: Monongahela River
- Locale: North Belle Vernon, Pennsylvania and Speers, Pennsylvania
- Other name: Belle Vernon Railroad Bridge

Characteristics
- Design: K-truss bridge

History
- Opened: 1931

Location
- Interactive map of Speers Railroad Bridge

The Speers Railroad Bridge, also called the Belle Vernon Railroad Bridge, carries the Wheeling and Lake Erie Railway across the Monongahela River from Speers east to North Belle Vernon in the state of Pennsylvania. The structure was originally designed by the Pittsburgh and West Virginia Railroad using a K-truss style that is rarely used outside of the Great Plains. The high-level span passes feature several smaller approach segments on the river's eastern bank due to the width of the valley.

== See also ==
- List of crossings of the Monongahela River
