= Muddy Creek Bridge, Maryland and Pennsylvania Railroad =

- U.S. National Register of Historic Places
- Location within Pennsylvania Location within the United States
- Location: Maryland and Pennsylvania railroad tracks over Muddy Creek, east of Creek Ridge Road, south of Sunnyburn, Lower Chanceford Township and Peach Bottom Township, Pennsylvania
- Coordinates: 39°45′37″N 76°21′5″W
- Area: less than one acre
- Built: c. 1909
- Architectural style: Pratt Truss
- MPS: Railroad Resources of York County MPS
- NRHP reference No.: 95000540
- Added to NRHP: May 4, 1995

The Muddy Creek Bridge, Maryland and Pennsylvania Railroad is a historic Pratt through truss railroad bridge in Lower Chanceford Township and Peach Bottom Township, York County, Pennsylvania. It was built about 1909, and measures about 120-foot-long (37 m) overall. It was built by the Maryland and Pennsylvania Railroad and crosses Muddy Creek.

It was added to the National Register of Historic Places in 1995.
