= B&O Railroad Bridge =

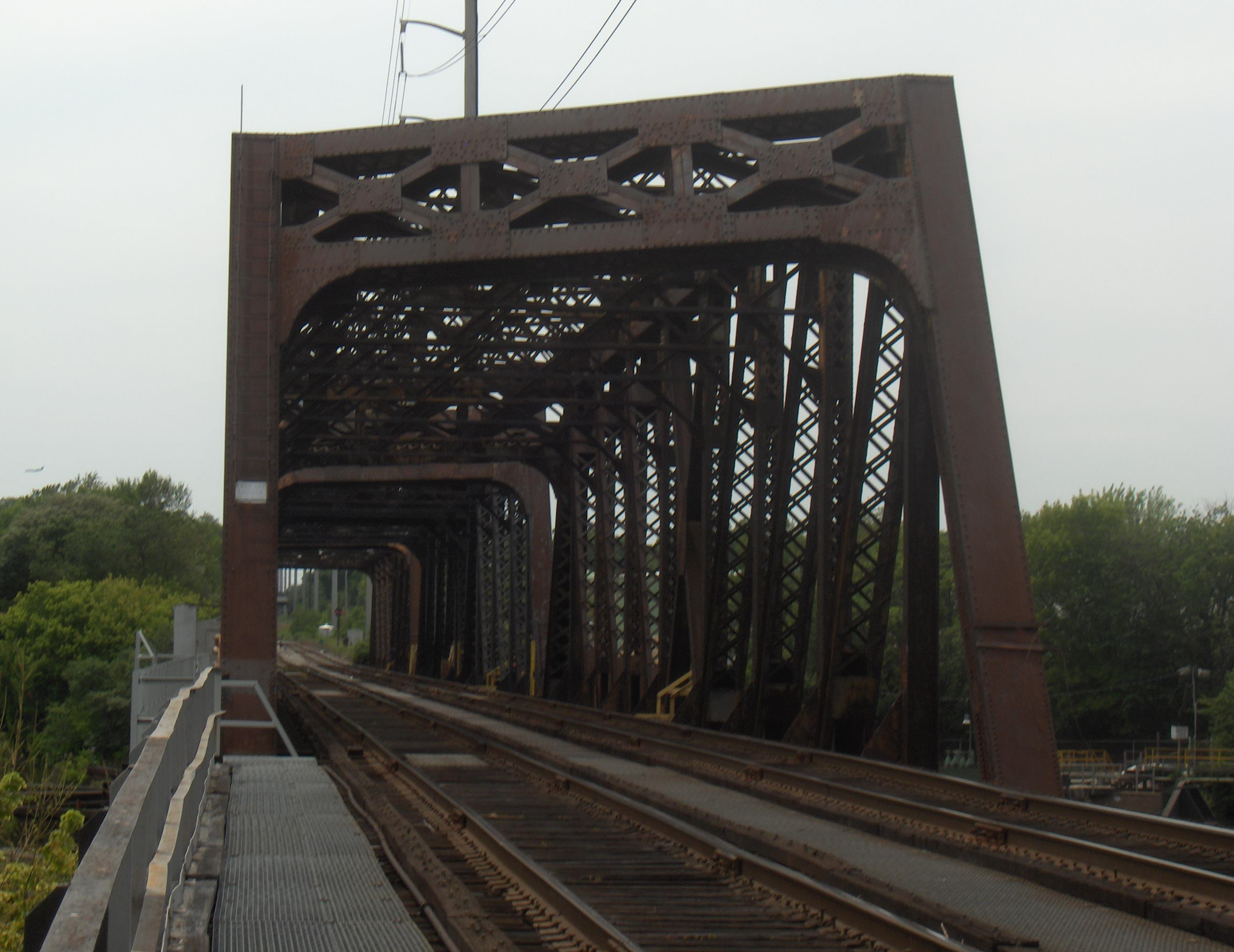
- B&O Railroad Bridge looking southwest
- Coordinates: 39°56′08″N 75°12′21″W
- Carries: Railroad
- Crosses: Schuylkill River
- Locale: Grays Ferry neighborhood in Philadelphia, Pennsylvania
- Other name: CSXT Schuylkill River Bridge
- Owner: CSX Transportation

Characteristics
- Design: Through truss swing bridge
- Piers in water: 3

History
- Fabrication by: American Bridge Company
- Opened: 1910, rehabilitated May 2004

Location
- Interactive map of B&O Railroad Bridge

The B&O Railroad Bridge (also called CSXT's Schuylkill River Bridge) is a 1910 swing bridge across the Schuylkill River from Bartram's Garden on the west bank to the east bank Grays Ferry neighborhood of Philadelphia, Pennsylvania. It carries CSX Philadelphia Subdivision rail lines over the river, and sits upstream from the Passyunk Avenue Bridge and downstream from the Grays Ferry Bridge.

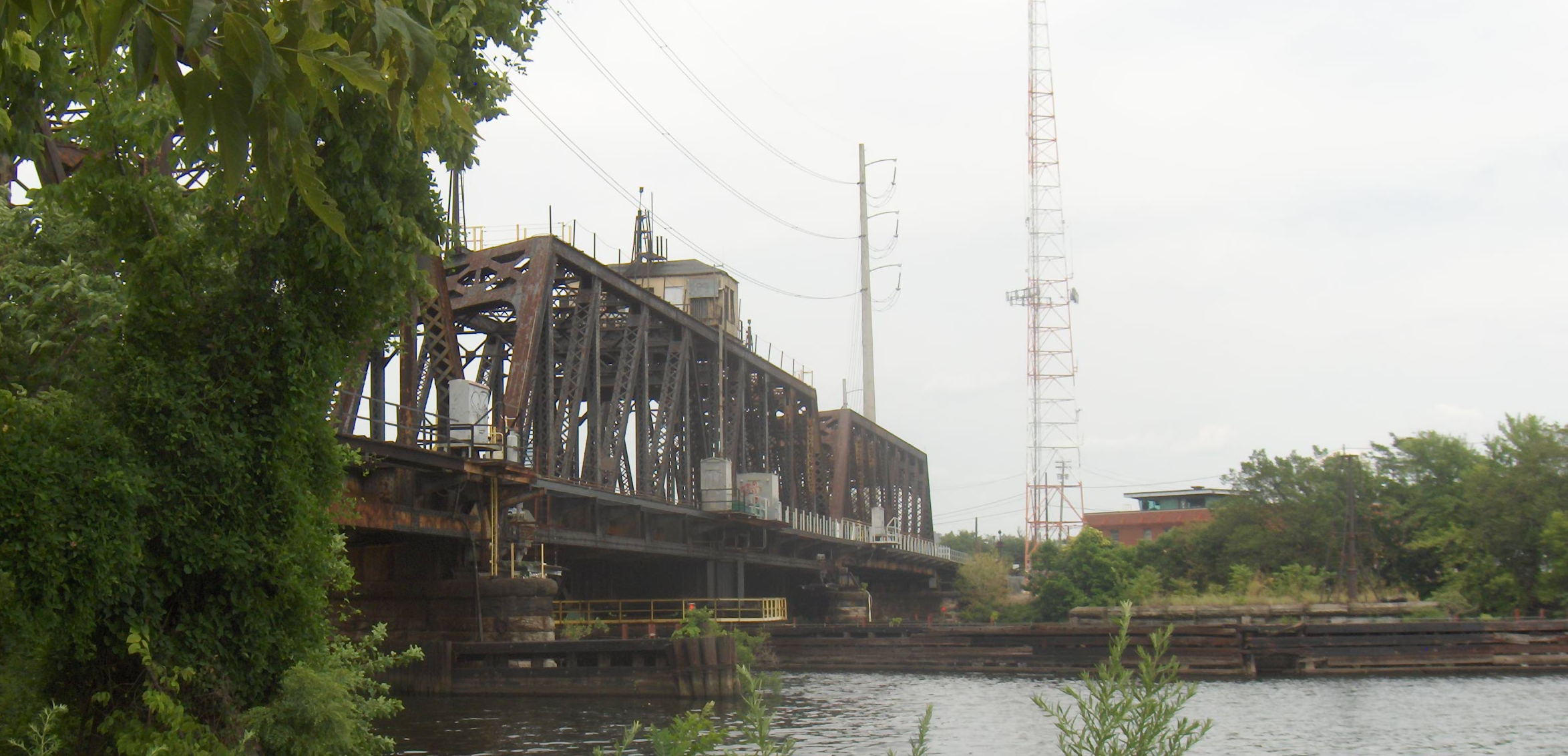
B&O Railroad Bridge looking northeast. Note the wooden fender for the near pier and the long wooden fender with yellow railings on top, which protects the swing bridge in the open position. (July 2010)

== Construction and history ==
It is the second bridge to occupy this location. The Baltimore and Ohio Railroad built the original one in the 1880s, after losing a stock takeover battle for its main route into Philadelphia, the Philadelphia, Wilmington and Baltimore Railroad. The winner, the rival Pennsylvania Railroad, gave the B&O until 1884 to build its own southwest line into the city before cutting off access.

The new route required a new bridge over the Schuylkill to replace the use of the PW&B's Gray's Ferry Bridge, and so the B&O built a four-span iron through truss bridge with a center swing span to allow boats to pass. It opened on July 11, 1886. (The cost of building the new route, especially the Howard Street Tunnel on the connecting Baltimore Belt Line, led to the B&O's first bankruptcy.)

In 1910, the B&O replaced the original bridge with the current one. The three-span through truss bridge with a center swing span was built by the American Bridge Company. During construction, a tugboat grounded on the nearby riverbank and was freed by a B&O locomotive.

The bridge was struck by the tugboat Radnor, hauling a barge loaded with oleum, on March 12, 1924.

The bridge was originally protected by a mechanical interlocking, which was revised in 1914. It was replaced in 1946 with an electrical interlocking, which also controlled the nearby junction with the Reading Company at Eastwick.

== Modern rehabilitation ==
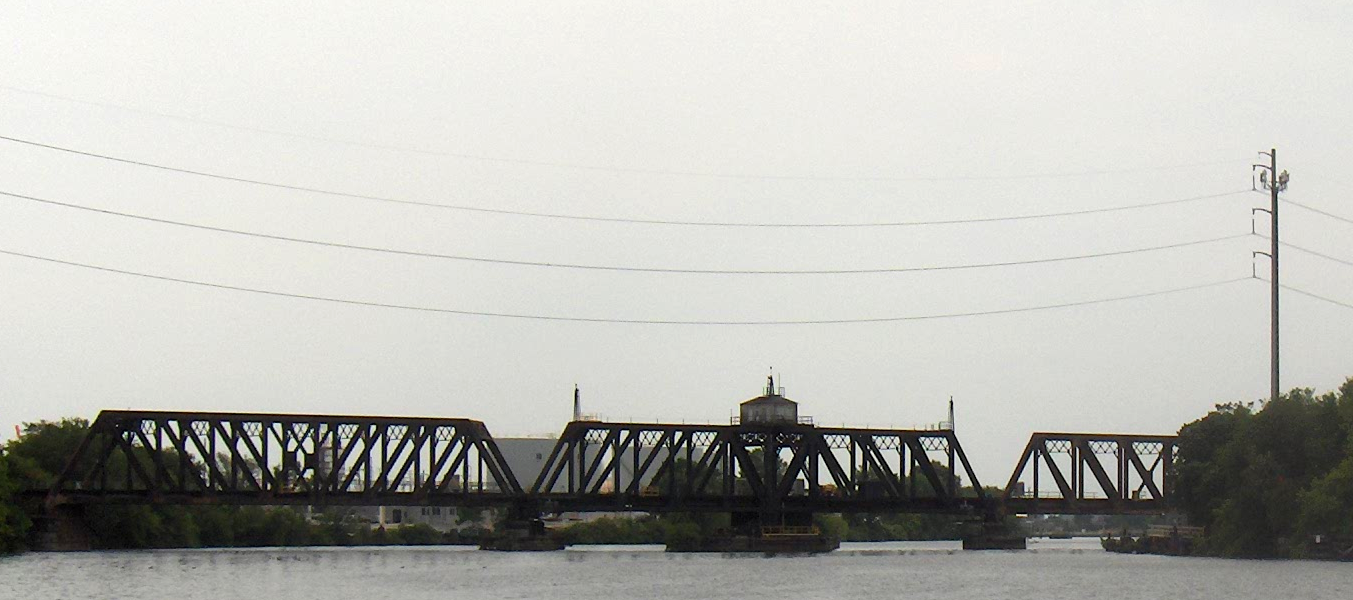
B&O Railroad Bridge (July 2010 photo)

In 1977, the Chessie System, then-owner of the bridge, did engineering studies of the swing bridge mechanisms and determined that extensive rehabilitation was needed. Yet the project was placed on hold for decades, despite associated FRA violations and operational difficulties.

In late 2003, Chessie successor CSX Transportation finally undertook the renovation. The project included extensive work on the miter rails, the mechanisms that allow the rails to be connected and disconnected as the bridge is opened and closed. Because the bridge could not be opened during construction, close coordination was required between the contractors; CSX, which controlled rail traffic; and the U.S. Coast Guard, which controlled marine traffic. The rehabilitation was completed on time in May 2004.

== See also ==
- List of crossings of the Schuylkill River
