= T-beam =

T-shaped construction module

Diagram of two T-beams

A T-beam (or tee beam), used in construction, is a load-bearing structure of reinforced concrete, wood or metal, with a capital 'T'-shaped cross section. The top of the T-shaped cross section serves as a flange or compression member in resisting compressive stresses. The web (vertical section) of the beam below the compression flange serves to resist shear stress. When used for highway bridges the beam incorporates reinforcing bars in the bottom of the beam to resist the tensile stresses which occur during bending.

The T-beam has a big disadvantage compared to an I-beam (with 'Ɪ' shape) because it has no bottom flange with which to deal with tensile forces, applicable for steel section. One way to make a T-beam more efficient structurally is to use an inverted T-beam with a floor slab or bridge deck joining the tops of the beams. Done properly, the slab acts as the compression flange.

== History ==
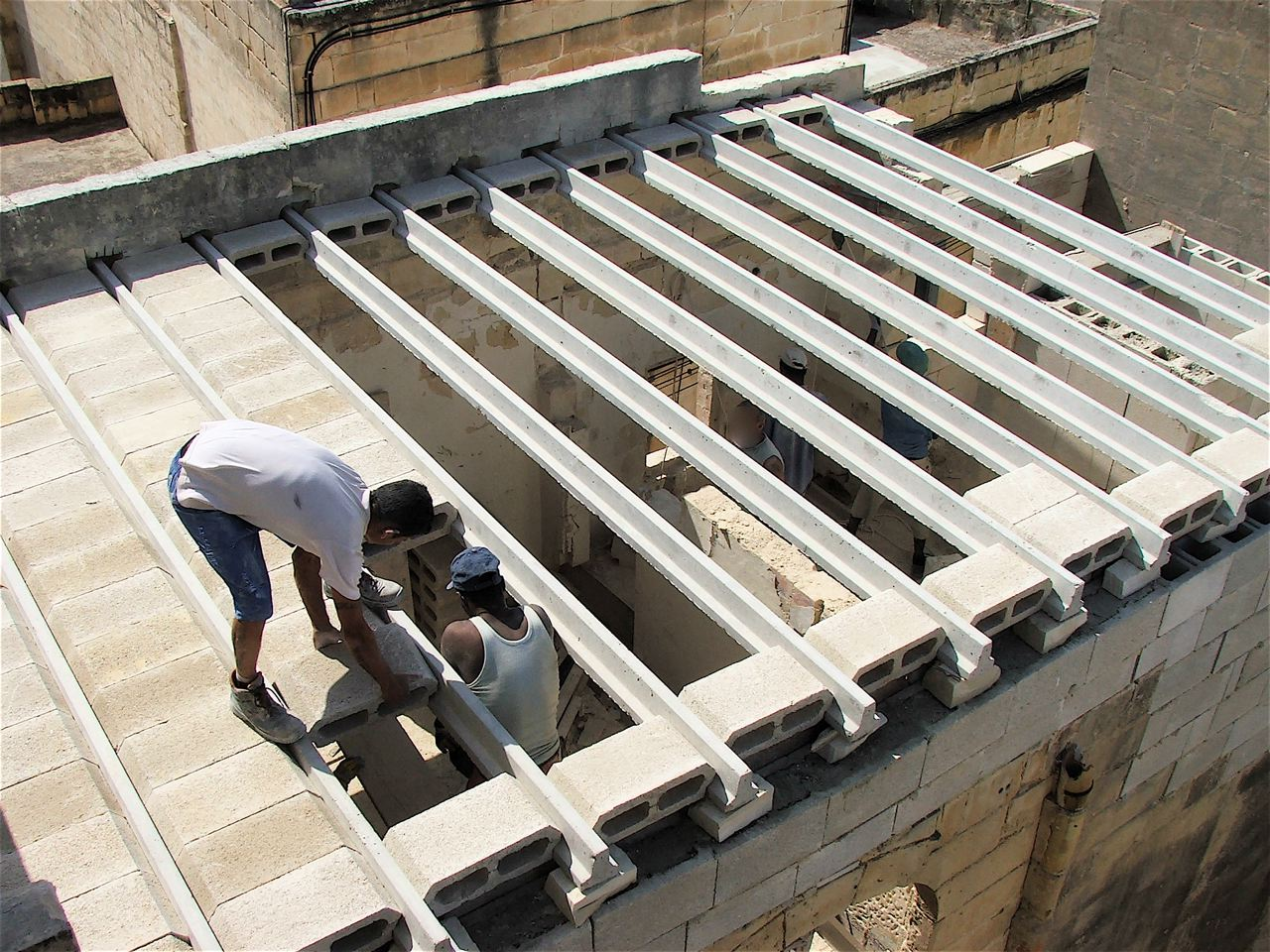
Roof of hollow concrete blocks supported on a series of inverted T-beams under construction in Malta, 2009

A T-beam is a structural element able to withstand large loads by resistance in the beam or by internal reinforcements. In some respects, the T-beam dates back to the first time a human formed a bridge with a pier and a deck. After all, a T-beam is, in one sense, no more than a pillar with a horizontal bed on top, or, in the case of the inverted T-beam, on the bottom. The upright portion carrying the tension of the beam is termed a web or stem, and the horizontal part that carries the compression is termed a flange. However, the materials used have changed over the years but the basic structure is the same. T-beams structures such as highway overpasses, buildings and parking garages, have extra material added on the underside where the web joins the flange to reduce the T-beam’s vulnerability to shear stress. However, when one investigates more deeply into the design of T-beams, some distinctions appear.

== Designs ==
Unlike an I-beam, a T-beam lacks a bottom flange, which carries savings in terms of materials, but at the loss of resistance to tensile forces. T- beam designs come in many sizes, lengths and widths to suit where they are to be used (eg highway bridge, underground parking garage) and how they have to resist the tension, compression and shear stresses associated with beam bending in their particular application. However, the simplicity of the T-beam is in question by some who investigate more complex beam structures; for example, a group of researchers tested pretension inverted T-beams with circular web openings, with mixed but generally favorable results. The extra time and effort invested in creating a more complex structure may prove worthwhile if it is subsequently used in construction. The most suitable materials also have to be selected for a particular T-beam application.

== Materials ==
=== Steel T-beams ===
Steel T-beams manufacturing process includes: hot rolling, extrusion, plate welding and pressure fitting. A process of large rollers connecting two steel plates by pinching them together called pressure fitting is a common process for non-load bearing beams. The reality is that for most roadways and bridges today, it is more practical to bring concrete into the design as well. Most T-beam construction is not with steel or concrete alone, but rather with the composite of the two, namely, reinforced concrete. Though the term could refer to any one of a number of means of reinforcement, generally, the definition is limited to concrete poured around rebar. This shows that in considering materials available for a task, engineers need to consider the possibility that no one single material is adequate for the job; rather, combining multiple materials together may be the best solution. Thus, steel and concrete together can prove ideal.

=== Reinforced concrete T-beams ===
Concrete alone is brittle and thus overly subject to the shear stresses a T-beam faces where the web and flange meet. This is the reason that steel is combined with concrete in T-beams. A problem of shear stress can lead to failures of flanges detaching from webs when under load. This could prove catastrophic if allowed to occur in real life; hence, the very real need to mitigate that possibility with reinforcement for concrete T-beams. In such composite structures, many questions arise as to the particulars of the design, including what the ideal distribution of concrete and steel might be: “To evaluate an objective function, a ratio of steel to concrete costs is necessary”. This demonstrates that for all aspects of the design of composite T-beams, equations are made only if one has adequate information. Still, there are aspects of design that some may not even have considered, such as the possibility of using external fabric-based reinforcement, as described by Chajes et al., who say of their tested beams, “All the beams failed in shear and those with composite reinforcement displayed excellent bond characteristics. For the beams with external reinforcement, increases in ultimate strength of 60 to 150 percent were achieved”. When it comes to resistance to shear forces, external reinforcement is a valid option to consider. Thus, overall, the multiple important aspects of T-beam design impress themselves upon the student of engineering.

== Issues ==
An issue with the T-beam compared to the I-beam is the lack of the bottom flange. In addition, this makes the beam not as versatile because of the weaker side not having the flange making it have less tensile strength.

Concrete beams are often poured integrally with the slab, forming a much stronger T–shaped beam. These beams are very efficient because the slab portion carries the compressive loads and the reinforcing bars placed at the bottom of the stem carry the tension. A T-beam typically has a narrower stem than an ordinary rectangular beam. These stems are typically spaced from 4’-0” apart to more than 12’-0”. The slab portion above the stem is designed as a one-way slab spanning between stems.

== Double-T beams ==
A double-T beam or double tee beam is a load-bearing structure that resemble two T-beams connected to each other. Double tees are manufactured from prestressed concrete using pretensioning beds of about 200-foot (61 m) to 500-foot (150 m) long. The strong bond of the flange (horizontal section) and the two webs (vertical members) creates a structure that is capable of withstanding high loads while having a long span. The typical sizes of double tees are up to 15 feet (4.6 m) for flange width, up to 5 feet (1.5 m) for web depth and up to 80 feet (24 m) or more for span length.
