= Bureau of Health Information =

Agency overview
- Formed: September 2009
- Type: Board-governed statutory authority
- Jurisdiction: New South Wales
- Headquarters: 1 Reserve Road, St Leonards, New South Wales 2065
- Agency executive: Dr Diane Watson, Chief Executive
- Key document: Health Services Act 1997
- Website: https://www.bhi.nsw.gov.au/

The Bureau of Health Information (BHI) is a board-governed organisation that publishes independent reports about the performance of the public healthcare system in New South Wales, Australia.

Its reports describe key aspects of healthcare activity and performance for a range of consumer, healthcare and policy audiences, to strengthen accountability and support improvements in patients’ healthcare experiences and outcomes.

BHI manages the NSW Patient Survey Program, gathering information from patients about their experiences of care in the healthcare system and subsequent health outcomes.

BHI is one of NSW Health's pillar organisations.

== Background ==
BHI was established in September 2009 by the NSW Government under the Health Services Act 1997 following the “Final Report of the Special Commission of Inquiry into Acute Care Services in NSW Public Hospitals” by Peter Garling, SC. The Garling Report recommended that: "a Bureau of Health Information be established to access, interpret and report on all data relating to safety and quality of patient care and facilitate its interpretation and re-issue to the unit level on a regular basis."

In 2011, BHI's unique role was recognised in the report of the NSW Health Director-General, Future Arrangements for Governance of NSW Health, stating that it would: "...clearly delineate the role of the Bureau as the system ‘expert’ in analysis and reporting of patient outcome information to the public and to clinicians."

In 2012, the management of the NSW Patient Survey Program was transferred to BHI from the NSW Ministry of Health. The program surveys patients about different aspects of their care and the results are used to identify and report on strengths and areas for improvement at NSW, local health district and individual hospital levels.

== Strategic plan ==
BHI operates under a rolling three-year strategic plan.

The 2019–2022 plan emphasises BHI’s continued commitment to provide high-quality information that is meaningful both within and outside the health system, supporting improvement and strengthening accountability, stating: “Through purposeful engagement and collaboration, BHI will ensure that its work aligns with and responds to health system priorities, providing actionable insights in areas that matter to patients.”

== Reports and products ==
BHI publishes a range of reports on the performance of the NSW public healthcare system and patient experience.

One of BHI's core reports is Healthcare Quarterly, which is a series of regular reports that track activity and performance across public hospital and ambulance services in NSW. Healthcare Quarterly allows year-on-year comparisons of hospital and ambulance performance.

BHI's annual Healthcare in Focus report looks at different aspects of healthcare performance in NSW. In 2021, the report provided insights into the impact of the COVID-19 pandemic on the NSW health system throughout 2020. It examined patterns of hospital and ambulance activity and performance by looking at measures including timeliness of care and patient experience, and also contained some international comparisons. In 2020, the report examined the experiences of care of more than 200,000 people who visited emergency departments or who were admitted to public hospitals over a five-year period.

BHI also publishes reports on the results of surveys conducted as part of the NSW Patient Survey Program.

For many of BHI's reports, detailed results for individual hospitals and areas are available on BHI's online data portal Healthcare Observer.

BHI maintains a table of planned reports and target release dates on its website.

== See also ==
- NSW Health
- Health care in Australia
- Public health
