= 1980 New South Wales local elections =

Local government elections in New South Wales, Australia

← 1977	20 September 1980	1983 →

The 1980 New South Wales local elections were held on 20 September 1980 to elect the councils of the local government areas (LGAs) of New South Wales, Australia.

Elections for 17 newly-formed councils were delayed and held on 6 December 1980, following amalgamations that affected a total of 39 LGAs. The new councils began officially operating on 1 January 1981.

== Background ==
=== Elections date ===
The date of the 1980 elections clashed with Yom Kippur, the holiest day of the year in Judaism, which began on 19 September and ended on 20 September. The NSW Jewish Board of Deputies sought to have the elections rescheduled, but these attempts were unsuccessful, with the Local Government Act stating that local elections must be held on the third Saturday in September.

Harry Jensen, the minister for local government, said he was unable to reschedule the elections, which had been held in September since 1962. Jensen was criticised by Liberal MP Rosemary Foot, who noted that legislation stated that "if [the election date] appears to the minister to be impracticable or inconvenient [...] he may appoint a subsequent day not being more than one month thereafter".

Special provisions were given to many Jewish voters, who voted earlier than 20 September and via post. At least eight Jewish candidates were elected to councils across New South Wales.

== Electoral system ==
Like at state elections, New South Wales local elections use optional preferential voting. The majority of mayors are elected by councillors at council meetings, although some are directly-elected. The mayoralty was directly-elected in Queanbeyan for the first time in 1980.

Voting was compulsory for anyone on the New South Wales state electoral roll.

== Candidates ==
The Labor Party continued to endorse candidates across a number of LGAs. Liberal Party leader John Mason criticised his party's decision to endorse candidates in Campbelltown and Sutherland.

The Communist Party of Australia endorsed candidates in a number of councils, including Leichhardt, Newcastle, Parramatta and Sydney.

== Campaign ==
=== Peter Baldwin assault ===
In the early morning hours of 17 July 1980, Peter Baldwin, a member of the New South Wales Legislative Council and a prominent left-wing activist within Labor, was assaulted at his home in the Sydney suburb of Marrickville. Baldwin claimed that his assault was the result of his efforts to expose fraud and corruption among right-wing Labor members in the inner Sydney area, and Labor officials said they believed they knew the identity of one of Baldwin's attackers.

Following the assault, the administrative committee of the NSW Labor Party asked the state government to postpone the elections for the inner-city councils of Botany, Leichhardt, Marrickville, South Sydney and Sydney. This did not eventuate, and elections for those councils went ahead as scheduled.

== Results ==
=== Labor ===
Despite speculation that the Baldwin assault could significantly harm the party, Labor had swings towards them across the state. The party won a majority in Sydney with nine seats, including lord mayor Doug Sutherland, with Civic Reform entering opposition for the first time in 11 years.

Labor retained its majority in Newcastle, with lord mayor Joy Cummings re-elected with 66% of the vote. Labor won 15 out of 16 seats in Marrickville (an increase of two) despite a challenge from independent candidates.

In Leichhardt, Labor won all 12 seats, with left faction members winning eight of those. There were no endorsed Labor candidates in Rozelle Ward, where "Honest Labor" candidates defeated "Official Labor" candidates who supported former deputy mayor Danny Casey.

=== Others ===
Clover Moore was elected to Redfern Ward in South Sydney as part of the "Redfern for People" ticket. The Community Action Group (led by Communist Party member Morry Breen) had 7.7% of the vote in Gosford.

In Liverpool, left-wing activist Don Syme was elected as part of the "Progress Association" ticket. A group of women calling themselves "Women on Council" won 3% of the vote.
