= 1995 New South Wales local elections =

Local government elections in New South Wales, Australia

← 1991	9 September 1995	1999 →

The 1995 New South Wales local elections were held on 9 September 1995 to elect the councils of the local government areas (LGAs) of New South Wales, Australia.

Although there was speculation that there could be backlash against the Labor Party based on federal political issues, this did not eventuate, and state Labor leader Bob Carr said he was happy with the results.

The Greens won 10 seats, including in Marrickville, one in Randwick, one in Woollahra and three in Newcastle. No Aircraft Noise gained representation in every LGA the party contested − two seats in Leichhardt, three in Hunter's Hill and three in Marrickville. Future MLC Sylvia Hale was one of the party's councillors in Marrickville.

In Eurobodalla, The Canberra Times wrote that candidates were engaged in a "nasty war of words". No major parties contested the election there, with the contest instead between the Progressives (led by mayor Chris Vardon), the ACCESS group (which was in a "loose alliance" with the Progressives) and Community Action (led by councillor Peter Cairney).

Queanbeyan City Council was reduced from 12 to 10 seats at this election.
