= Royal North Shore Hospital =

Hospital in Sydney, Australia

- Northern Sydney Local Health District

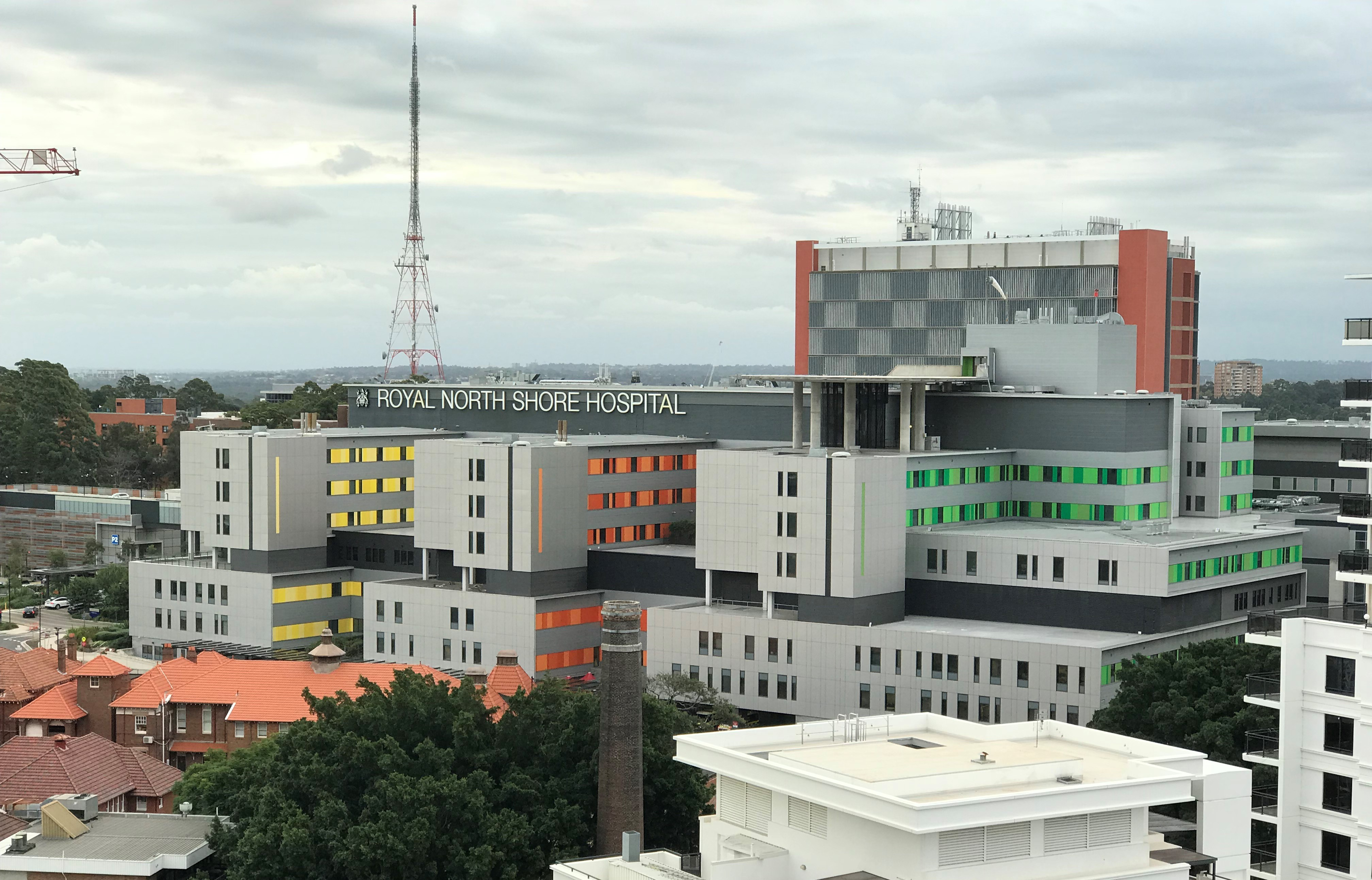
- Royal North Shore Hospital - April 2019

Geography
- Location: Reserve Road, St Leonards, New South Wales, Australia
- Coordinates: 33.8222°S 151.1925°E

Organisation
- Care system: Medicare
- Type: District General, Teaching
- Affiliated university: Australian Catholic University; University of Sydney; University of Technology
- Network: NSW Health

Services
- Emergency department: Yes, Major Trauma Centre
- Beds: 713

Helipads
- Helipad: (ICAO: YXNS)
Number	Length		Surface
Number	ft	m	Surface
1			concrete

History
- Founded: 1885

Links
- Website: Royal North Shore Hospital

The Royal North Shore Hospital (RNSH) is a major public teaching hospital on the Lower North Shore region of Sydney, New South Wales, Australia, located in the suburb of St Leonards. It serves as a teaching hospital for Sydney Medical School at the University of Sydney, University of Technology Sydney and Australian Catholic University and has over 600 beds.

RNSH is the principal tertiary referral hospital for the Northern Sydney Local Health District. It is also a major Trauma Centre which provides specialised services in the areas of severe burns, neonatal intensive care, spinal cord injury and interventional radiology. The Kolling Institute of Medical Research is a health and medical research centre with a focus on research training. Its primary referral area accommodates 5.7% of the Australian population or 17% of the NSW population.

RNSH was ranked as the third best hospital in Australia, based on the Newsweek 2023 World's Best Hospitals list.

== History ==
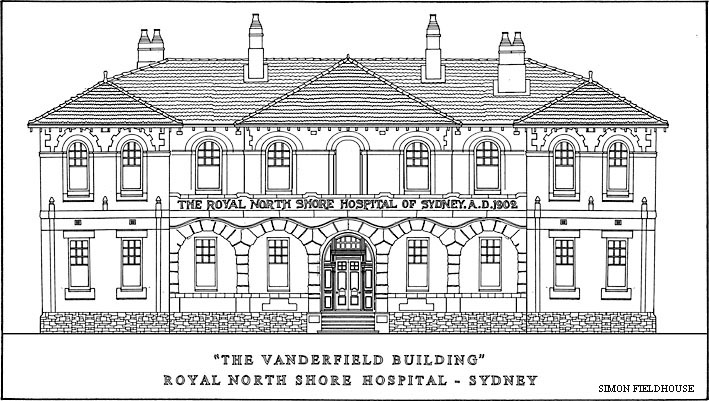
Vanderfield Building - Original design

=== Foundation ===
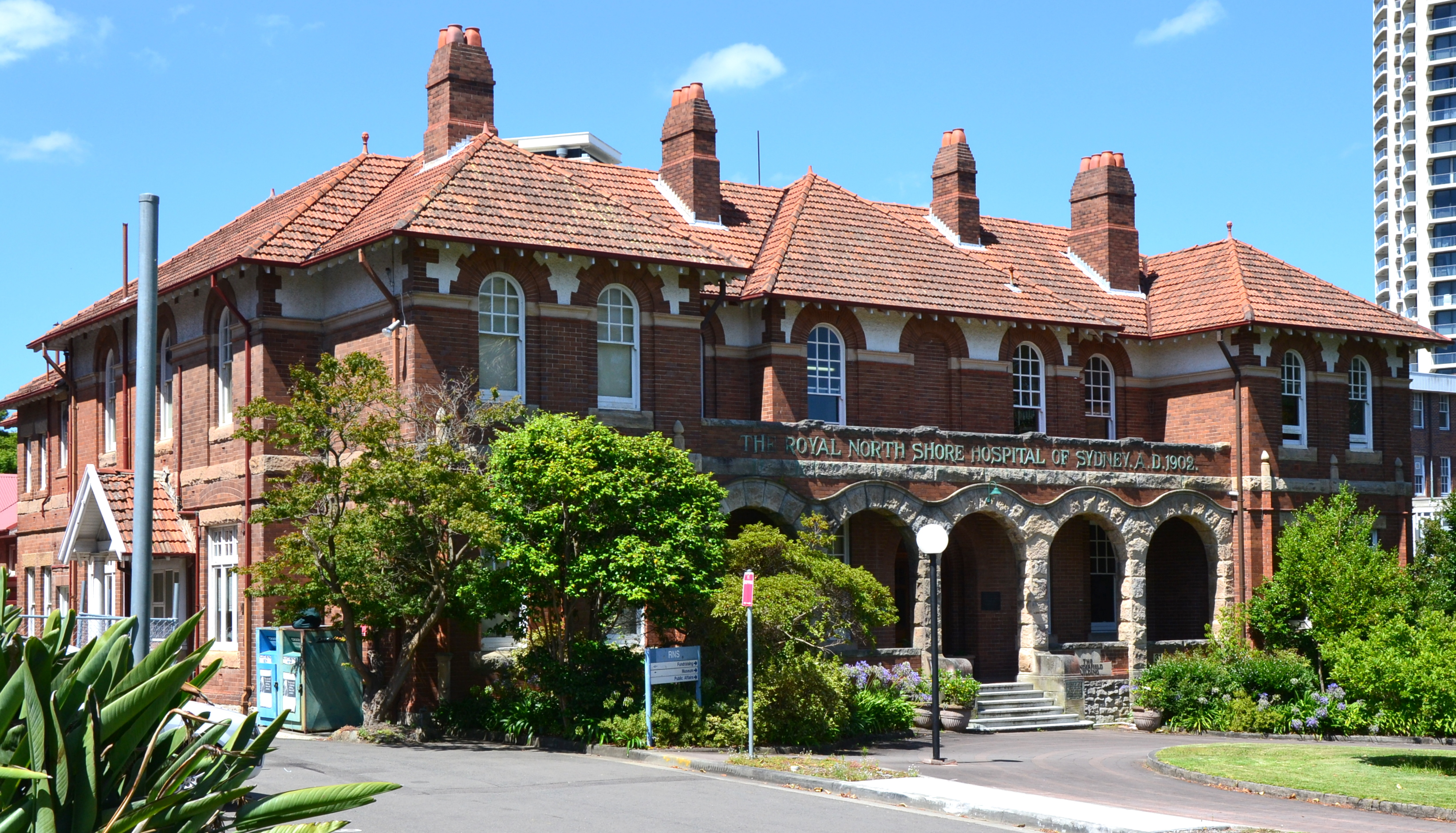
The Vanderfield Building in 2016

The RNSH began as a cottage hospital located in Willoughby Road, Crows Nest. The foundation stone was laid by Sir Henry Parkes, 18 June 1887. The hospital was opened with accommodation for fourteen patients, with the requisite office and rooms for the medical and nursing staff. Medical staff numbered four honorary doctors and nursing staff numbered five. The site of the original hospital was bounded by Willoughby Road, Albany and Holterman Streets and Zig Zag Lane. The old site is now a busy part of the commercial centre of Crows Nest. In 1902, it opened on its current site at St Leonards, with 48 beds available for patients. New departments and wards were added over the next fifty years.

Between 1935 and 1940, polio treatment pioneer Sister Kenny travelled extensively throughout Australia helping to set up clinics. In the mid-thirties, she set up one of her pioneering clinics at RNSH. In 1940, the New South Wales government sent Kenny to America to present her clinical method for treating polio victims to American doctors. Doctors in Minnesota were impressed with her work and convinced her to stay. Her treatments, which revolutionised the care of polio, caused as much controversy in the United States, as they had in Australia.

Royal North Shore became a teaching hospital of the University of Sydney in 1947.

Minnie May Gates MBE served on the hospital's board throughout the 1940s and 1950s (as her father and grandfather had done). She campaigned to improve the hospital's child care. She stood down in 1960, the year that the Minnie Gates Playground was opened in the grounds.

=== Redevelopment ===
In 2008, new facilities were procured under a Public Private Partnerships (PPP) contract. The selected bidder, Infra Shore, includes ABN AMRO, construction company Thiess and service providers Thiess Services, ISS Facility Services and Wilson Parking. The works were carried out by Thiess and completed in 2011.

== Current services ==
Royal North Shore Hospital (RNSH) is a major teaching hospital located in the Northern Sydney Local Health District. There are currently 5,000 staff working at RNSH. It provides local health services to five local government areas north of Sydney Harbour – Lane Cove, Mosman, North Sydney and Willoughby and Ryde — and caters for more than 1,110,600 people, which equates to 1 out of every 20 Australians, and 1 in 5 people living in NSW population.

RNSH has statewide responsibilities in the provision of healthcare. It is one-of-seven major trauma centres in NSW and is the only trauma centre capable of providing care for major burns, spinal injuries, and serious injuries during pregnancy. The RNSH emergency and trauma services are complemented by comprehensive intensive care and diagnostic clinical support services. RNSH is also a major referral and tertiary hospital for the area extending north of Sydney Harbour, up to the southern shore of Lake Macquarie, and west to Wiseman's Ferry.

As a major teaching hospital, RNSH has acted as an education facility for University of Sydney undergraduate medical students for more than 60 years and acts as the main headquarters for the program's Northern Clinical School. The hospital's teaching program involves students of allied health and nursing students from University of Technology, Sydney. RNSH also provides facilities and support for postgraduate students, scientists and clinicians undertaking research programs in a variety of fields.

The RNSH campus comprises the Acute Services Building (opened in 2012), the Douglas Building and The Clinical Services Building (opened in December 2014). The overall area of the RNSH grounds is approximately 13 hectares, and 11.6 hectares in functional area. It is commonly known as the Royal North Shore Hospital Campus.

RNSH currently has a maximum capacity to hold 420 acute medical and surgical beds. Overall, including acute overnight and day-only beds, it has a total of 600 beds. In 2010, there were 56,354 presentations to the Emergency Department and, since the opening of the new Acute Services Building, increased presentations have occurred with 61,739 patients requiring assessment and treatment in 2012/13. Approximately 3,000 babies are born annually at RNSH.

=== Campus ===
Acute Services Building

- New teardrop-shaped helipad capable of supporting two helicopters in an emergency
- Inpatient wards for medical and surgical patients with a combination of one-bed and four-bed rooms
- An outpatient (ambulatory care) center
- A new Comprehensive Cancer Care Centre
- Enhanced diagnostic services
- 18 operating theatres
- Capacity for a 58-bed intensive care unit with single rooms
- Automated guided vehicles to transport food, linen, and waste around the hospital

Clinical Services Building

- 40 Maternity Beds
- 32 Neonatal Intensive Care Beds
- 12 Burns Unit Beds
- 60 Orthopaedic/trauma beds
- 24 Paediatric Beds
- 32 Beds for Mental Health Patients, as well as 12 beds allocated for High Dependence patients.

Community Health Centre

- Aboriginal health services
- Children's health services
- Community mental health
- Drug and alcohol outpatient services
- Opioid treatment program (OTP)
- Renal services
- Sexual assault and sexual health clinic

Douglas Building

- COVID-19 clinic
- Pain management clinic
- 40 bed ward for the treatment of COVID-19 positive patients
- Carer accommodation
- Staff health clinic

Herbert Street Clinic

- 11 bed inpatient unit for detoxification from drug and alcohol addiction
- 4 of 11 beds for the NSW involuntary drug and alcohol treatment program (IDAT)

=== Medical units ===
- Acute Dialysis Unit
- Audiology
- Bone Densitometry
- Major Burns
- Cancer Centre
- Cardiac Cath Labs
- Cardiology
- Paediatrics
- Dermatology
- Emergency Department
- Endocrinology
- Endoscopy
- Haematology
- Intensive Care Unit
- Medical Day Procedure
- Mental Health
- Neonatal Intensive Care
- Neurology
- Neurointervention (INR)
- Neurosurgery
- Nuclear Medicine
- Ophthalmology
- Physiotherapy
- Sexual Assault
- Urology

== Notable incidents ==
In 2005, 16-year-old Vanessa Anderson was hit by a golf ball. She died two days later in RNSH. The coroner found that "almost every conceivable omission had occurred in her treatment".

Following the case of patient Jana Horska, who suffered a miscarriage in the hospital's toilet as a result of lack of available beds and staff, the State Government established the Joint Select Committee on the Royal North Shore Hospital in the New South Wales Parliament on 23 October 2007, chaired by Christian Democrats leader Fred Nile MLC. The committee was formally established on 23 October 2007, and tabled its report on 20 December 2007. The report made 45 recommendations.

In early 2008, a Special Commission of Inquiry into Acute Care Services in NSW Public Hospitals was commissioned. This comprehensive and ground breaking commission became known as The Garling Report. It reported in November 2008. The NSW State Government responded in March 2009. It found a "prevalent" problem associated with the care of the deteriorating patient in NSW public hospitals. As a result, a statewide system of monitoring vital signs to detect deteriorating patients was introduced. This system includes red and yellow "Between the Flags" colour-coded observation charts for recording a person's vital signs, allowing for easy visual recognition of deterioration. Observation charts have been developed for Adult, Paediatric, Maternity and Emergency patients. By 2012 it had been implemented in every public hospital in NSW.

In August 2015, a patient of the outpatient diabetes clinic attended RNSH for a routine appointment at 9:30 am. The patient failed to present to the clinical staff and was subsequently listed as a "no-show" to his appointment. His spouse later, concerned that her partner had not returned from his appointment, contacted RNSH and advised staff that her partner did not attend his scheduled appointment. It was not until 6:30 am the following day that a cleaner located the man in a public toilet within the hospital premises. It was found that the patient suffered a stroke.

In August 2016, RNSH came under fire when it was revealed that doctors at the hospital were issuing restricted antibiotics to tens of thousands of patients, without seeking approval. Northern Sydney Local Health District's system through which approval to prescribe the powerful antibiotics is sought, called eASY, had not been used to generate any of these prescriptions. Use of the eASY system, designed to combat the spread of superbugs, had fallen to just 35% in May 2016.

A foetus was incorrectly cremated in an incident in August 2015 that resulted in the parents being unable to bury their child as per their wishes. The admission came after state budget estimates exposed a separate body swap at RNSH, in which the daughter of a deceased patient found that staff had incorrectly tagged her remains.

== See also ==
- Healthcare in Australia
- Lists of hospitals
- List of hospitals in Australia
