= Fellow of the Royal Australasian College of Physicians =

Specialist medical accreditation

Fellow of the Royal Australasian College of Physicians, abbreviated as the post-nominal initials FRACP, is a recognition of the completion of the prescribed postgraduate specialist training programme in internal adult or internal paediatric medicine of the Royal Australasian College of Physicians.

== Fellowship training programme ==
The fellowship training programme requires that prospective trainees are registered medical practitioners in Australia and/or New Zealand. Specifically, prospective trainees must have completed a medical degree; completed an intern year; been appointed to an accredited hospital by the college for basic training; discussed their application with, and received approval from, the accredited hospital or a Director of Physician Education. International medical graduates must complete the Australian Medical Council Certificate in addition to the aforementioned requirements.

Multiple pathways lead to fellowship, but all pathways require significant amount of training, time and commitment and consist of three main stages:

- Basic training;
- RACP examinations; and,
- Advanced training.

The qualification of FRACP is awarded for training programmes in adult internal medicine and in paediatrics and child health. Both programmes have a similar structure, but the content and examinations are accordingly different.

=== Basic training ===
Basic training, formally the Royal Australasian College of Physicians's Physician Readiness for Expert Practice (PREP), consists of a series of 36 months of accredited hospital posts, approved by local directors of physician training. These posts encompass a variety of medical specialties; emergency medicine; and tertiary centre, regional, and rural hospital rotations.

The programme must contain prescribed proportions of the aforementioned areas and locations and is assessed by ongoing continuous assessment by the candidate's supervising physicians.

Basic training is approximately equivalent to the internal medicine residency program in the United States or core medical training programme in the United Kingdom.

=== RACP examinations ===
After 24 months of basic training, trainees become eligible to sit the external RACP examinations. These consist of a written and a clinical examination. The written examination consists of multiple-choice questions and is held once a year in February. The clinical examination, consisting of two long cases and four short cases, is examined by two assessors (per case) and is held in July, after successful completion of the written exam. Both examinations must be successfully completed before a trainee may progress to advanced training.

The written examination is analogous to the board certification examination for internal medicine in the United States and the MRCP Part 1 and 2 (written) exams in the United Kingdom. Unlike the United States and United Kingdom examinations, however, the RACP examinations do not confer an award or qualification upon their successful completion; instead, the entire RACP programme must be successfully completed for the award and qualification of FRACP.

The RACP examinations are the primary hurdle to becoming a specialist physician and are noted for being among the most difficult specialty exams in the world, with an average first-attempt fail rate of approximately 50%, despite intensive preparation of most candidates.

=== Advanced training ===
Advanced training consists of a programme of 3–4 years, depending on the requirements of the specialty, of training in a specialty of the trainee's choosing. A trainee must meet the requirements of the specialty advisory group via undertaking, for instance, clinical training in hospital posts, research, or clinical training in overseas hospital posts or research overseas. Multiple specialisations and subspecialisations are possible, but this is associated with increases in training time.

Most specialties do not require an exit examination.

== Recognition ==
Fellowship appears to be a highly regarded qualification, given the extended and rigorous training program, the wide experience & knowledge base, and general commitment required for its attainment.

Fellowship of the Royal Australasian College of Physicians (or its recognised equivalent) is a requirement to be recognised as a Specialist or Consultant Physician, in General (Internal) Medicine or the relevant subspecialty, in Australia and New Zealand. A formal complex process (for recognition of equivalence) is needed for specialists who possess overseas specialist qualifications but who do not possess the FRACP. The requirements change from time to time. External commentators, such as Mr Peter Garling, SC, have described these processes as 'onerous' during a 2008 statutory inquiry.

FRACP or its recognised equivalent, in Australia, also allows some Physicians to be recognised as specialists within the Health Insurance Act 1973, and therefore charges incurred by patients when consulting them, may be reimbursed in whole or part by the Australian Government. In Australia, like in the UK and some other jurisdictions, the FRACP (and other fellowships) does not give the right to statutory registration as a medical practitioner: it is the basic medical degree which does.

The RACP claims that accountability for the quality of the examination processes within the RACP is of the highest standard. The clinical examination process requires rigorous calibration of all examiners (mandatory) and assessment of all candidates against the clinical skills required of Consultation Physicians in Australia - history taking, clinical analytical abilities and clinical Skills. Evaluation of the clinical examiners includes assessment by other (often more experienced) examiners and high level peer review (by at least 1 other examiner at a local level, and by 6–9 at the national level, always in combination). The National Examinations Panel (NEP) consist of 97 adult physicians selected by their prior examination performance and who represent the geographical spread and specialist range of clinical internal medicine skills in Australia and New Zealand.
