= 1974 New South Wales local elections =

Local government elections in New South Wales, Australia

← 1971	21 September 1974	1977 →

The 1974 New South Wales local elections were held on 21 September 1974 to elect the councils of the local government areas (LGAs) of New South Wales, Australia.

The Labor Party suffered swings away from them across the state, losing control of councils including Blacktown, Sutherland and Wollongong.

== Electoral system ==
Like at state elections, New South Wales local elections use optional preferential voting. The majority of mayors are elected by councillors at council meetings, although some are directly-elected.

Unlike at state and federal elections, voting was not compulsory. This was the first time 18-year-olds were able to vote at New South Wales local elections, after the Whitlam federal government lowered the voting age from 21 in 1973. This was also final time voting was optional, with compulsory voting reintroduced in 1977.
