= The Garling Report =

2008 Australian hospital report

The Garling Report (formally titled the Final Report of the Special Commission of Inquiry into Acute Care Services in NSW Public Hospitals) is a 2008 report prepared by the office of the Australian Commissioner Peter Garling, SC following a series of high-profile medical mishaps in the New South Wales public hospital system. For the duration of the commission, it was well covered by mass media. Its final 139 recommendations stimulated considerable discussion and controversy.

== Background ==
In November 2005, an Australian teenager named Vanessa Anderson died at Royal North Shore Hospital following a golfing accident. Her death, widely reported in the media, led to long-running controversy and motivated government-level changes to public hospital policy. It was alleged that her death occurred due to inadequate care and a systemic hospital failure to recognize signs of a deteriorating patient.

On 6 November 2005, while attending a school sporting event at a golf course, Vanessa Anderson was hit on the head by a golf ball. She was taken to Hornsby Hospital and subsequently transferred to the Royal North Shore Hospital. She was allegedly treated inappropriately for a fractured skull, and two days later, suffered a seizure and died. The coroner determined that Vanessa died from respiratory arrest due to the depressant effect of opiate medication.

The incident, among others, led to a 2008 commission, authored by Peter Garling, to investigate the standard of patient care in public hospitals, which found a "prevalent" problem associated with the care of the deteriorating patient.

In 2010, the NSW Health Department conceded that Vanessa's death was unnecessary, tragic and avoidable, and that a new system of monitoring vital signs to detect deteriorating patients was needed statewide. This system includes red and yellow "Between the Flags" colour-coded observation charts for recording a person's vital signs, allowing for easy visual recognition of deterioration. Observation charts have been developed for Adult, Pediatric, Maternity and Emergency patients.

By 2012, every state hospital in New South Wales adopted the Between the Flags system, implementing Between the Flags Standard Observations Charts and a Clinical Emergency Response System (CERS) that details the process for calling for help and the clinicians required to attend. Medical officers, nurses, allied health practitioners (including physiotherapists) and other staff now undergo mandatory training to adhere to these standards. This manner of recording and acting upon variations in haemodynamics is now also taught to medical and nursing students in NSW.

== See also ==
- Acute care
