= Carwoola =

- Town
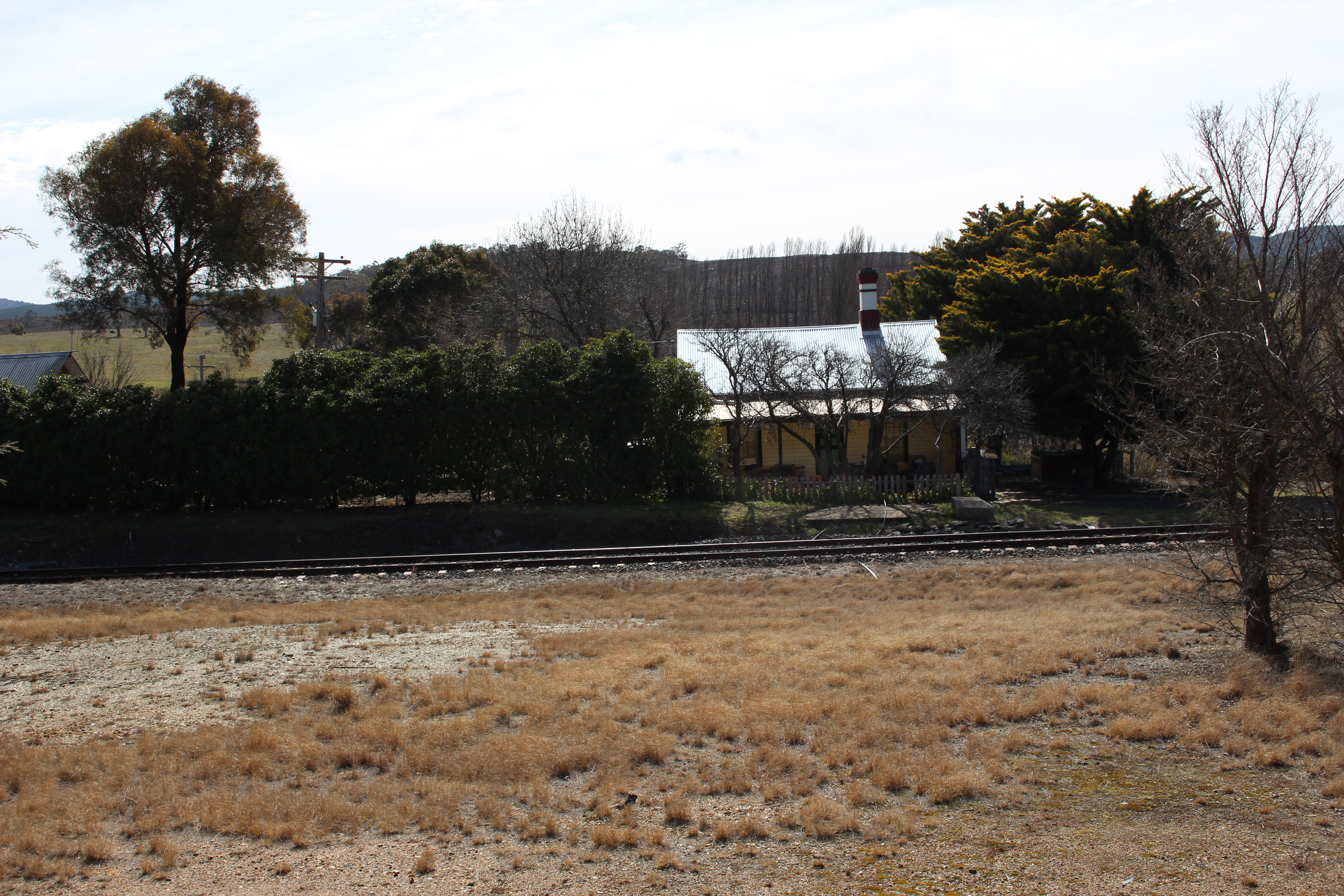
- Burbong station house. The railway station was closed in 1975.

- Coordinates: 35°21′51″S 149°19′39″E
- Country: Australia
- State: New South Wales
- LGA: Queanbeyan-Palerang Regional Council
- Location: 133 km (83 mi) WNW of Batemans Bay; 9.1 km (5.7 mi) E of Queanbeyan; 19.5 km (12.1 mi) SE of Canberra; 297 km (185 mi) SW of Sydney

Government
  - State electorate: Monaro
  - Federal division: Eden-Monaro
- Elevation: 726 m (2,382 ft)

Population
  - Total: 1,602 (SAL 2021)
- Postcode: 2620
- County: Murray
- Parish: Carwoola
Localities around Carwoola
The Ridgeway	Kowen (ACT)	Bungendore
Greenleigh	Carwoola	Hoskinstown
Googong	Yarrow	Primrose Valley

Carwoola is a locality in the state of New South Wales, Australia. It is immediately to the south of the Kowen district, which is located in the Australian Capital Territory. The Molonglo River passes through the Carwoola area before opening out into the Molonglo Plains. The Kings Highway and Captains Flat Road are the two major through routes. Carwoola is part of the Queanbeyan-Palerang Regional Council and the Southern Tablelands geographic area. The area also roughly aligns with the original Carwoola Parish.

== Community ==
Carwoola has a Community Hall, managed by the local Community Association and a Rural Fire Brigade of the NSW Rural Fire Service (the Carwoola Brigade, formerly Stoney Creek Brigade) as well two public areas in Bowen Street and Molonglo River Drive.

Carwoola Landcare is also an active part of the Molonglo Catchment Group.

== History ==
The first European expeditions to the area were as follows. In late October 1820, Charles Throsby, Joseph Wild and James Vaughan passed through nearby Kowan, led by their guide, Taree. After this, Throsby's nephew, Charles Throsby Smith, with Wild and Vaughan and an unnamed Aboriginal guide arrived at the junction of the Molonglo and Queanbeyan Rivers on 8 December 1820. But the first European expedition to pass directly through Carwoola was that of Charles Throsby, with Wild again and an unknown Aboriginal guide in March 1821.

The first settler and also the first pastoralist to reside on his own large holding in the district was Owen Bowen (1778-1840), a convict who had arrived in the Colony on 2 July 1811, having sailed from Falmouth aboard the ship Providence. Bowen secured a 'ticket of occupation' for one thousand acres at Marlow Plains (an early name for the Limestone Plains) in June 1824 and set up a large dairy herd. He purchased the property after the limits of occupation were extended to include the area in 1829.

Timothy Beard, a convict who had arrived in the Colony in 1805 and received his pardon in 1817, set up as an innkeeper on 100 acres of land near Campbelltown. In 1828 he "squatted" on the Molonglo River near where Canberra Abattoir was situated (now the industrial estate in the suburb of Beard).

A property next to Owen Bowen was owned by William Balcombe, Colonial Treasurer from 1823 until his death in 1829. Balcombe had previously been an official of the East India Company at St Helena, and it was here that he befriended Napoleon Bonaparte during his exile. His friendship with Napoleon was considered so dangerous that he was eventually removed to London, before eventually settling in Sydney. On 5 August 1824, Governor Brisbane offered Balcombe a grant of 2,000 acres at Menanglo or Marlet Plains about eighteen miles southwest of Lake George. William Balcombe Snr called his property "The Briars" (after his estate of the same name on St Helena where Napoleon stayed for the first few weeks of his captivity). William Balcombe junior built a slab home just below where the present stone cottages stand today. He managed the Carwoola property from his residence at Kenmore near Goulburn. It was once claimed that William Snr was responsible for introducing two plants to Australia, the Sweet Briar (Rosa rubiginosa) and the Weeping Willow (Salix babylonica). The willow grew nearby Napoleon’s grave on St Helena and Balcombe was reported to have taken cuttings from these trees. But their claim has been proved false, as the family was expelled from St Helena before Napoleon had even died and were barred, as Francophiles, from returning. The earliest record of willow planting in Australia using St Helena slips, even pre-dates the Balcombe’s arrival in Australia. It is by Captain Thomas Raine at Parramatta in 1822. If the Molonglo willows were grown from cuttings taken from Napoleon’s grave they would have been sourced through another family of St Helena immigrants: the family of Alfred Mainwaring Rich (of Ginninderra and Gundaroo), whose relatives owned the land on which Napoleon was originally buried.

John Hosking (1806-1882) was owner of "Foxlow" station, which was named after his wife Martha Foxlow Terry, and settled on the estate around 1835. Hoskinstown is named after John Hosking, although it has undergone several nomenclature changes since its beginning. Hosking purchased "Foxlowe" previously known as Molonglo from Antill, Henry Colden (1779–1852). He established an estate at Primrose Valley which was to remain in the family until then. Antill was an Aide-de-Camp to Governor Macquarie and its believed he received the land as a grant.

Thomas Rutledge bought an estate on the Molonglo Plain in the mid-1800s and called it "Carwoola" from the aboriginal name of land first occupied by Owen Bowen. The aboriginal word was Carrowillah which means "where the water meets the plain".

Carwoola had a school between 1868 and 1871, 1873 and 1904, 1907 and 1910 and 1919 and 1924, usually operating as a "half-time" school, otherwise as a public or provisional school. There was also a "half-time" school at Flannel Tree in southwestern Carwoola between 1910 and 1913 and between 1919 and 1923. During the latter period the two schools shared a teacher.

== Heritage listings ==
Carwoola has a number of heritage-listed sites, including:

- 1071 Captains Flat Road: Carwoola Homestead
- Goulburn-Bombala railway: Burbong railway bridge

=== Bushranging ===
The bushranger William Westwood, alias Jacky Jacky, was active in the Carwoola area, bailing up a victim at the 11-Mile turnoff in December 1840 after escaping from his convict servitude at the Gidleigh station, six kilometres east of Bungendore.

=== Burbong station ===
A station was established on the Bombala railway line at the crossing of the Molonglo in 1887 and originally called Molonglo. In 1890, it was renamed Burbong and a small settlement developed there. The station was closed in 1975.

=== 2017 bushfire ===
A bush-fire that began on 17 February 2017 destroyed 11 homes in the town and burned out 3,500 hectares (8,600 acres). 45 outbuildings were destroyed and another 40 damaged, with 25 vehicles and 150 km of fencing also destroyed. Very few livestock were lost, despite initial reports of severe losses. 2 firefighters were injured, 1 suffering burns. The other firefighter sustained a crush injury when fire tankers were being moved. The number of houses destroyed was subsequently revised down to 8.

Two men were charged in July 2017 with "..failing to comply with a total fire ban and setting fire to another's property." In court on 2 September, their lawyers said they would plead not guilty.

In early August 2017 a class action for residents affected by the fires was begun by Maddens Lawyers of Victoria.
