= Queanbeyan railway bridges over Queanbeyan and Molonglo Rivers =

Queanbeyan rail bridges
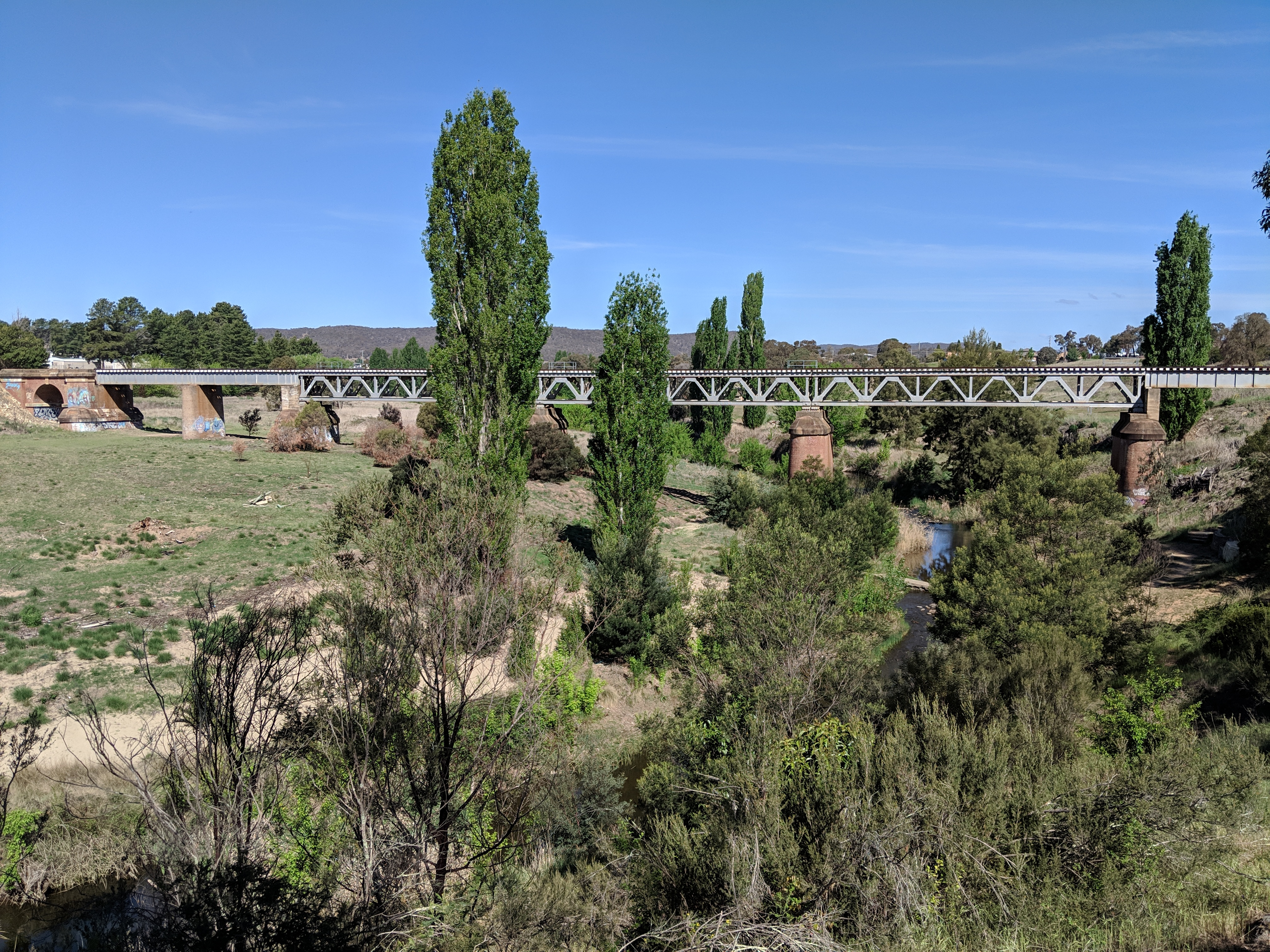
- Queanbeyan River railway bridge
- Coordinates: 35°20′33″S 149°13′54″E (QR); 35°20′14″S 149°19′09″E (MR)
- Carries: Bombala railway line
- Crosses: Queanbeyan River; Molonglo River
- Locale: Queanbeyan, Queanbeyan-Palerang Region, New South Wales, Australia
- Begins: Queanbeyan (Queanbeyan River); Carwoola (Molonglo River)
- Ends: Queanbeyan East (Queanbeyan River); Carwoola (Molonglo River)
- Other name(s): Burbong bridge (Molonglo River Bridge)
- Owner: Transport Asset Manager of New South Wales

Characteristics
- Design: Warren truss bridge
- Material: Steel
- Longest span: 90 feet (27 m)
- No. of spans: 4 (Queanbeyan River Bridge); 3 (Molonglo River Bridge)

Rail characteristics
- No. of tracks: One
- Track gauge: 4 ft 8 1/2 in (1,435 mm) standard gauge

History
- Construction start: 1926
- Construction end: 1927
- Construction cost: A£19,000

New South Wales Heritage Register
- Official name: Queanbeyan rail bridges over Queanbeyan and Burbong Rivers
- Type: State heritage (complex / group)
- Designated: 2 April 1999
- Reference no.: 1052
- Type: Railway Bridge/Viaduct
- Category: Transport – Rail

Location
- Interactive map of Queanbeyan rail bridges

The Queanbeyan railway bridges over Queanbeyan and Molonglo Rivers are two heritage-listed railway bridges that carry the Bombala railway line in the Queanbeyan-Palerang Region local government area of New South Wales, Australia. Both bridges were built between 1926 and 1927. The westernmost bridge crosses the Queanbeyan River from Queanbeyan to Queanbeyan East at 35.3424°S 149.2317°E, while the easternmost bridge (approximately 8 kilometres (5 mi) to the east) crosses the Molonglo River at Burbong (now Carwoola) at 35.3371°S 149.3191°E. The two railway bridges are owned by Transport Asset Manager of New South Wales, an agency of the Government of New South Wales. Together, the two bridges were added to the New South Wales State Heritage Register on 2 April 1999.

== History ==
The bridges were first built by contractors Johnston & Co. in 1885–87 along with the extension of the railway from Bungendore to Michelago through Queanbeyan. The Molonglo River bridge was completed in May 1886 and the Queanbeyan River bridge in July 1887, both opening with the line in September 1887. The original bridges consisted of arched hardwood timber girders on brick piers and stone abutments, featuring four spans (Molonglo River) and five spans (Queanbeyan River) of 24 metres (80 ft) each. The stone for the abutments came from the quarries at Pyrmont in Sydney. A temporary bridge over the Queanbeyan River during construction was reported at the time to be the largest temporary railway bridge ever constructed in New South Wales.

The bridges were completely rebuilt in 1926–27 at a cost of A£19,000, re-using the foundations of the original bridge. Both bridges were of the Warren deck steel truss type, consisting of four 44-foot (13 m) steel spans on the approaches to each side with three (Queanbeyan River) and two (Molonglo River) spans of 90 feet (27 m) comprising the main bridge. The timbers of the original bridge were still in "a remarkable state of preservation" when replaced, such that it could not be cut in some cases. The bridge upgrade allowed a heavier type of engine to be run on the line.

The Molonglo River bridge is sometimes known as the Burbong bridge, Burbong being a historical name for its location.

== Heritage listing ==
The Queanbeyan rail bridges over Queanbeyan and Burbong Rivers was listed on the New South Wales State Heritage Register on 2 April 1999 having satisfied the following criteria.

The place possesses uncommon, rare or endangered aspects of the cultural or natural history of New South Wales.

This item has some historical rarity due its association with the 1887 Cooma Railway and the reuse of the original foundations for the 1926 replacement trusses. The Warren deck trusses are relatively rare because there are only four other railway sites in NSW with this type of superstructure.

== See also ==
- List of railway bridges in New South Wales
