= Greenleigh, New South Wales =

Greenleigh Queanbeyan, New South Wales
- Coordinates: 35°21′40″S 149°15′16″E
- Population: 676 (2021 census)
- Postcode(s): 2620
- Elevation: 660 m (2,165 ft)
- Location: 18 km (11 mi) SE of Canberra; 3 km (2 mi) SE of Queanbeyan; 288 km (179 mi) SW of Sydney
- LGA(s): Queanbeyan-Palerang Regional Council
- County: Murray
- Parish: Queanbeyan
- State electorate(s): Monaro
- Federal division(s): Eden-Monaro
Suburbs around Greenleigh:
Queanbeyan East	The Ridgeway	Carwoola
Queanbeyan	Greenleigh	Carwoola
Karabar	Googong	Carwoola

Greenleigh is an acreage estate to the east of the City of Queanbeyan in New South Wales, Australia. It was formerly known as Dodsworth. At the 2021 census, Greenleigh had a population of 676.

Greenleigh has the highest house prices and rates in Queanbeyan.
