= 1983 New South Wales local elections =

Local government elections in New South Wales, Australia

← 1980	24 September 1983	1987 →

The 1983 New South Wales local elections were held on 24 September 1983 to elect the councils of the local government areas (LGAs) of New South Wales, Australia.

== Background ==
=== Electoral structure changes ===
A number of councils had their electoral structures altered prior to the 1983 elections. Bogan was reduced from ten to nine, Tumut was reduced from ten to eight, Warren increased from ten to twelve and Wellington increased from ten to eleven.

Gloucester, Kyogle, Murray, Murrumbidgee and Tallaganda were all increased from eight to nine councillors.

=== Deferred elections ===
In August 1983, local government minister Lin Gordon announced that elections for 13 councils would be postponed until 10 December 1983 while possible amalgamations were considered. The City of Sydney and the municipalities of Ashfield, Botany, Burwood, Canterbury, Concord, Drummoyne, Leichhardt, Marrickville, Randwick, Strathfield, Waverley and Woollahra were all affected.

A number of these councils appear to have eventually gone ahead with elections as planned on 24 September. However, Ashfield, Canterbury, Leichhardt and Sydney did not, with their elections moved to 14 April 1984.

== Results ==
The Liberal Party, which contested a number of LGAs for the first time, had a swing towards them. In Wollongong, one member of the Active Community Team (ACT) was elected, while A Women in Local Government (WILGO) was unsuccessful.

In Blue Mountains, the Communist Party of Australia unsuccessfully contested Ward 1 and Ward 4, receiving 1.91% and 1.94% of the vote respectively.

Ted Mack was re-elected as mayor of North Sydney with 70% of the vote.

== Referendums ==
At least one referendum was held.

LGA	Question	YES		NO		Informal		Turnout		Ref
LGA	Question	Votes	%	Votes	%	Votes	%	Total	%	Ref
Bega Valley	"Should Bega Valley shire be declared a nuclear-free zone?" (exact wording unknown)	6,056	55.62	4,832	44.38					
