= Carwoola Homestead =

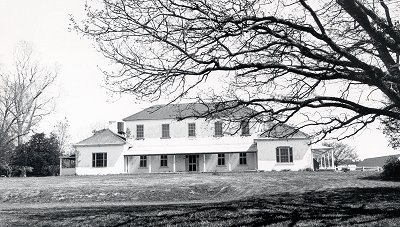

- Location within New South Wales Location within Australia
- 35.4260°S 149.3851°E
- Location: 1071 Captains Flat Road, Carwoola, Queanbeyan-Palerang Region, New South Wales, Australia

History
- Built: 1830–1850

Site notes
- Owner: Carwoola Pastoral Co Pty Ltd

New South Wales Heritage Register
- Official name: Carwoola Homestead
- Type: state heritage (built)
- Designated: 2 April 1999
- Reference no.: 36
- Type: Homestead Complex
- Category: Farming and Grazing
- Builders: William and Thomas Rutledge

Carwoola Homestead is a heritage-listed homestead complex at 1071 Captains Flat Road, Carwoola, in the Southern Tablelands of New South Wales, Australia. It was built from 1830 to 1850 by William Rutledge and later his brother Thomas Rutledge. It was added to the New South Wales State Heritage Register on 2 April 1999.

== History ==
The botanist Allan Cunningham journeyed across the Molonglo Plains in April 1824 while leading an expedition into southern New South Wales. He called this flat country Marley's Plains, unaware they had also been called Friday's Plains two years earlier. Both names were superseded by use of the word "Molonglo". In 1835 Cunningham's younger brother Richard, the Superintendent of the Sydney Botanic Garden, was clubbed to death by aborigines while accompanying the NSW Surveyor-General Thomas Mitchell on his second journey of exploration. Allan Cunningham replaced Richard as Superintendent.

The land (2560 acres/1036 ha) was granted in 1828 to Henry Gilbert Smith who formed the station. Smith arrived in Sydney in 1827.

Use of the name Carwoola dates from at least 1850 and may be a derivation of the word Carrowillah, mentioned as early as 1827. Carwoola or Carrowillah is said to be an Aboriginal word for "the meeting of the waters on the plain", a lyrical, apt title because Carwoola station lies on river flats between hills bisected by the Molonglo River, which is fed by numerous streams. The meaning may also be found in the fact that Primrose Creek, a southern tributary of the Molonglo, meets that river to the north-east of St. Thomas' Anglican Church, built on Carwoola land. An historian writing in 1938 claimed that 'The Molonglo River was known to the Aborigines as the Yealambidgee, meaning a chain of waterholes, and the plains on the watershed of this river above Carwoola Gap as Molinggoolah, which name has been corrupted into the modern Molonglo. Moolinggoolah was subdivided by the Aborigines into Carwoola (still retained) and Enwoola (now Foxlow), meaning the centre and the end of the plain below and above the junction of the Tirralilly River.'

The origins of Carwoola began with the construction of several small slab dwellings by Edward John Eyre. Eyre, later to become a famous explorer, bought 1260 acres from Smith in 1834 at 4 shillings an acre.

Smith sold the land in 1836 to William Rutledge. Rutledge bought Eyre's two blocks in 1837. Later, Rutledge is said to have bought "The Briars", a nearby property on which two early stone cottages still stand. This land belonged to William Balcombe who went overland to Port Phillip with William Rutledge in 1838 and later settled at The Briars, Mornington Peninsula, Victoria.

It is possible that Gilbert Henry Smith and/or William Rutledge might have been responsible for the earlier buildings. The buildings surviving today were built by William and Thomas Rutledge in the late 1830s. The National Trust of Australia says it was sold to William Rutledge in 1836, adding that Thomas Rutledge settled here and built the present house probably prior to his marriage in 1849 to his first cousin, Martha Forster of Brush Farm (Eastwood, Sydney).

In 1839 Rutledge's brother Thomas had sailed to Australia and become Carwoola's manager. He was only in his early 20s and developed extensive pastoral interests including the purchase of Carwoola. William Rutledge settled in Victoria where he became known as "terrible Billy" for his explosive temper and unreserved use of "the language of a centurion". Thomas Rutledge later became owner of Carwoola.

The Rutledges gradually extended their holdings so that by the 1870s they controlled about 90,000 acres (by 1877 Carwoola and another Rutledge property, Gidleigh, totalled 90,000 acres (36,450ha) and Carwoola became the centre of rural hospitality in the district. Under Thomas Rutledge, Carwoola became a most important centre, catering for the needs of neighbouring settlers and passing travellers. Its homestead was being described as architecturally "of the modern style". It was said that it 'comprises two stories, and is built of the best materials, with a verandah around three sides... All the usual appurtenances belonging to a well-appointed station are here also, such as store, post office...Telegraph office...and several cottages for the hands employed.

In 1848 Rutledge gave a ball at Carwoola, one of the guests being Stewart Mowle who had to ride through a threatening windstorm to get there. Mowle's diaries record his dislike of the Rutledges: "Rutledge, a very common North of Ireland man, as the Rutledges are...". Others saw Rutledge differently. He became a prominent breeder of fast racehorses and when he died in 1904, aged 86, was called "a great sporting enthusiast...He owned and bred some of the best horses in the district". An obituary notice described him as "most hospitable, generous, sympathetic and broad minded...(with) a bright and genial disposition". His widow Martha survived him by five years, dying in 1909. Thomas and Martha Rutledge lie today in the small graveyard of St. Thomas' Anglican Church, whose iron roof and steeple are just visible from Carwoola's second entrance gate, 2 km away on the Captain's Flat Road. The church was built on land donated by Rutledge and was the work of noted church architect and builder, the Rev. Alberto Soares. It was built between 1872–4, and consecrated in 1876. Its prominent east window depicting St. Thomas and Christ was presented in 1873 by Sir Edward Knox and his wife, Martha, who was Thomas Rutledge's sister. Sir Edward Knox founded the Colonial Sugar Refining Co. and had many other business interests. Mrs Elizabeth Falkiner of Foxlow presented a stile to give access (over the fence) into the grounds, but over the years this has been removed. Like the Rutledges, Mrs Falkiner and her husband, Franc Brereton Sadlier Falkiner, are buried next to each other in this graveyard.

In its heyday from 80-100 people lived here, with old married men's quarters (with one room each) and young married men's quarters (with two rooms each)

Carwoola passed into the hands of a South Australian, James Maslin, in 1907 and at the time of the sale was a station of 40,000 acres (16,200ha) carrying 12,000 sheep The wartime death of his 21-year-old son, Jim, is recorded in an inscription on a window in St. Thomas's Anglican Church, Carwoola. Jim was killed in France in action in 1917 and the church window depicts a uniformed soldier. A wall tablet, erected by Alice Thornton Mills, also commemorates Jim Maslin. Thomas Rutledge who also helped fund the church, as well as donating the land, is remembered twice - on a plaque and a memorial window. It is possible that the graveyard may have been in use before the church was built because an inscription on what is called the Bowen family vault honours the 1788 convict Owen Bowen who died in 1840. After gaining his ticket-of-occupation for 100 acres of land, making him the "first authorised occupant to reside on a large holding in the district". Bowen arrived on the scene in 1811.

James Maslin by 1928 had grown the property to 25,778 acres. In 1928 it was subdivided and sold off in 7 blocks. The sales poster described the property as "high class grazing, breeding and fattening country on the favoured Southern Tablelands". The "homestead" block of 8189 acres was described: as "built of stone, and out buildings are palatial, and with its surroundings and ornamental trees remind one of an English home. All modern conveniences, including water, electric light and sewerage are installed".

In 1929, the homestead was described as a two-story stone building containing 16 rooms in the main structure, including a billiard room, surrounded by landscaped gardens and various introduced English tree species, such as elms and oaks.

The property was owned by the Scott family from the 1920s until 1972.

In 1979 the then owner of Carwoola requested the placement of a Permanent Conservation Order and sought technical advice from the Heritage Council. Following a site visit by the Heritage and Conservation branch and in recognition of its historic and aesthetic significance a Permanent Conservation Order was placed over the property on 21 December 1979. It was transferred to the State Heritage Register on 2 April 1999.

== Description ==
Carwoola is an early colonial homestead complex containing a large number of early buildings set in an impressive rural landscape of natural and man-made elements. The site has important historical associations and was a centre of rural hospitality in the district during the later part of the 19th century. The site has significant historic values as evidence of early pastoral development and achievement.

The homestead complex with its wide variety of out-buildings in both stone and slab, was described in 1866 as 'the magnificent property of Thomas Rutledge, Esq. Which may be termed "the model farm Par Excellence of NSW". It could equally be described as the nineteenth century homestead par excellence because of its completeness.

The farm today is 5000 acres.

=== Inner homestead complex ===
The central main house is a two-storied Georgian block flanked on either side by single storey wings that project in front to form a verandah. At the rear of the house two stone wings, built separately, enclose a sheltered court yard, around which are a number of early outbuildings, namely a stone hayshed, stone stables, several stone workman's cottages and a slab hut and stables. The main block's architecture is strong, simple and unpretentious. There is also another single storey section at the rear with a skillion roof from the main house.

A large U-shaped homestead built in at least two different stages with a wide variety of out-buildings in both stone and slab.

The main facade consists of a two-storied section flanked on either side by two single-storied wings, each of three rooms. The impression is one of grandeur, so it is surprising to find that the central two-storied section consists of but two main rooms downstairs and one large and two smaller bedrooms upstairs. Apart from differences in proportion between the central section and wings, there are indications that the two sections are not contemporaneous. On the rear wall, a mark in the cement render occurs at the junction of the two sections and whereas the central section is built on a plinth, the walls of the wings at the rear are in one plane to ground level

Possibly the earliest part of the homestead itself is the north-wing at the rear, a building with a Dutch gable (jerkin roofed). Part of this seven-roomed building is finished in a way which suggests that it could well have been living quarters, perhaps the earliest homestead. Later it was probably used as storage space, augmented by the pine-lined loft which runs the full length of the building. There is also a loft above half of the parallel (southern) kitchen wing which could well be a later building, contemporaneous perhaps with the central two-storied section.

The upper storey has five symmetrically disposed windows (to the east/front) which are shown with shutters in early oil paintings at Carwoola. The front door which consists of two vertical panels and sidelights opens into a hall with an elegant staircase and fine straight balusters. To the right is the large sitting room with an exquisitely restrained white marble fireplace, said to be the signed work of the 19th century neoclassical sculptor, Canova. To the left of the hall is the dining room, lit, as is the sitting room, by a pair of tall four-paned sash windows. The woodwork for the six-panelled doors, windows and original mantelpieces is (red) cedar. Certain alterations have been made to the mantelpieces: one was removed to accommodate the Canova mantelpiece and one removed to make way for a wooden one in the taste of the 1920s. However, there are numerous typically Georgian mantelpieces throughout the homestead. This suggests that the addition of the single storied wings might have taken place within a short period of time after the two storied section.

Throughout the house is fine cedar joinery, six panelled doors, cantilevered stair, large sash windows with small panes and simple Georgian fireplace surrounds. The windows in the wings are flanked by unusual extra side lights and have cedar shutters which fold into the reveals.

=== Outbuildings ===
The number of (out-)buildings is so great that much time could be spent in attempting to work out the order of growth of the homestead complex. Homestead and outbuildings erected over a period between about 1830 to 1850. Most buildings are of the local hard rubble stone, originally white-washed.

Though the project took two decades to complete, the specific layout of the outbuildings themselves in relationship to the surrounding gardens was intentional.

Stone Block

Containing the Meat Room, Coach House, two suites of two rooms, cell with only one barred window and an old kitchen with flagged floor - this block is most striking. Behind this section an enormously-long high stone wall extends protecting the remains of the kitchen garden in which an old mulberry, a walnut and a fig tree survive. On one side are small skillion rooms used as harness store and saddle shop with a saddle store on the other side. A loft runs the full length of this building.

Stone Stables (nearby the Stone Block, above)

'A hell of a big building for five bloody horses'.

Slab Stables

Slab building for horse stalls where the slabs are set vertically on large horizontal logs.

Slab shed

Beyond the slab stables is a slab building which may have been a salt shed set on piers.

Barn of rubble stone

(beyond the slab salt shed) with walls 2 ft (0.6m) thick.

On either side of the buildings are large openings to allow for hay drays pulled by six or eight horses.

Blacksmith's Shop

Still functioning in part is the two storied slab blacksmith's shop and coach house, the sturdy box uprights of which are charred black as a prevention against white ants.

Cottages

Some early cottages not far from the homestead are now contained within later additions.

Shearing Shed

This is on other side of the entrance drive from the main gate, with an early small stone house.

=== Yards and Garden ===
The homestead is approached via a large complex to its west comprising a shelter belt of Monterey pines (Pinus radiata) perpendicular to the road and passing a full suite of rural outbuildings, yards and appurtenances and a recent manager's house to the south.

The homestead complex is set in an impressive garden setting. The current owners have re-established the oak-lined original driveway (which approaches the house from the north-west). A rear driveway approaches from due west of the homestead along the shelter belt of Monterey pines. The sizeable pond at the front (east) is an addition, and has been extended twice.

Mature oaks (Quercus robur) and elms (Ulmus procera) allow winter sun in, allowing naturalised spring European bulbs such as daffodils and jonquils (Narcissus spp.), star flowers (Ipheion sp.), star-of-Jerusalem (Ornithogalum umbellatum) and winter or Lenten roses (Helleborus niger and Helleborus orientalis) to flourish below. Summer brings roses and lavender flowers (Lavandula sp.). A mature bunya pine (Araucaria bidwillii) is north-east of the homestead - the current owner has added a second young bunya pine. Younger plantings include red and pink-flowered crab apples (Malus spp./cv.s), winter honeysuckle (Lonicera fragrantissima), Persian lilac (Syringa persica / S.p.'Meyeri'), golden chain tree (Laburnum rossii) and Japanese or flowering quince (Chaenomeles speciosa).

A large vegetable garden is north of the outbuilding complex north and west of the homestead, providing year-round food for the family, along with salad greens and citrus from a glasshouse, built in the back of the old stables. An old walnut (Juglans regia) and mulberry (Morus nigra) tree shelter in the lee of tall brick walls facing north. Apple trees and a chicken palace are also in this area. A recently planted trufferie is nearby. An enormously-long high stone wall extends protecting the remains of the kitchen garden in which an old mulberry, a walnut and a fig tree survive.

== Heritage listing ==
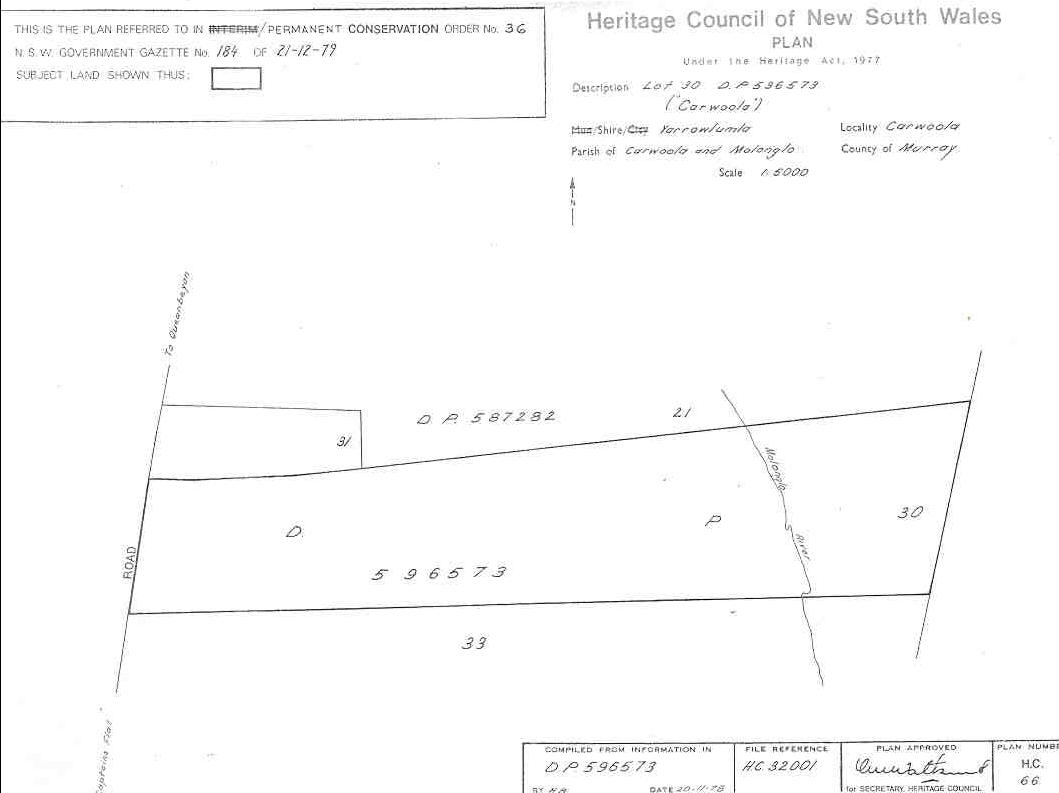
Heritage boundaries

Carwoola is an early colonial homestead complex containing a large number of early buildings set in an impressive rural landscape of natural and man-made elements. Carwoola homestead and outbuildings was erected over a period between about 1830 to 1850. The main blocks architecture is strong, simple and unpretentious, while the outbuildings re not only noteworthy as vernacular forms but also for the interesting groupings that they create in an impressive garden setting. The site has important historical associations and was a centre of rural hospitality in the district during the later part of the 19th century.

Carwoola Homestead was listed on the New South Wales State Heritage Register on 2 April 1999 having satisfied the following criteria.

The place is important in demonstrating the course, or pattern, of cultural or natural history in New South Wales.

Carwoola Homestead and outbuildings was erected over a period between about 1830 to 1850. The site has important historical associations and was a centre of rural hospitality in the district during the later part of the 19th century.

The place is important in demonstrating aesthetic characteristics and/or a high degree of creative or technical achievement in New South Wales.

Carwoola is an early colonial homestead complex containing a large number of early buildings set in a rural landscape of natural and man-made elements. The main block's architecture is simple and unpretentious, while the outbuildings are noteworthy as vernacular forms and for the interesting groupings that they create in a garden setting.
