= 1977 New South Wales local elections =

Local government elections in New South Wales, Australia

← 1974	17 September 1977	1980 →

The 1977 New South Wales local elections were held on 17 September 1977 to elect the councils of the local government areas (LGAs) of New South Wales, Australia.

== Electoral system ==
Like at state elections, New South Wales local elections use optional preferential voting. The majority of mayors are elected by councillors at council meetings, although some are directly-elected.

For the first time since the 1968 local elections, voting was compulsory for anyone on the New South Wales state electoral roll. The Wran state government announced the change in July 1976, with a fine of up to $10 applying for non-voters.

== Candidates ==
The Labor Party and the Communist Party of Australia continued to endorse candidates in several LGAs.

== Results ==
=== Labor ===
There were swings towards Labor in at least 12 councils, with the party gaining a majority in at least three. In Newcastle, the Communists had 3.5% of the vote, with the overall voter turnout increasing by 46%.

=== Others ===
Voter turnout increased significantly across the state, including a 51% increase in Holroyd.
