= Queanbeyan East =

- Suburb
- Interactive map of Queanbeyan East
- Coordinates: 35°20′43″S 149°14′46″E
- Country: Australia
- State: New South Wales
- City: Queanbeyan
- LGA: Queanbeyan City Council

Government
  - State electorate: Monaro
  - Federal division: Eden-Monaro

Population
  - Total: 4,240 (2021 census)
- Postcode: 2620
- County: Murray
- Parish: Queanbeyan
Suburbs around Queanbeyan East
Oaks Estate		The Ridgeway
Queanbeyan	Queanbeyan East	The Ridgeway
Queanbeyan	Greenleigh	Greenleigh

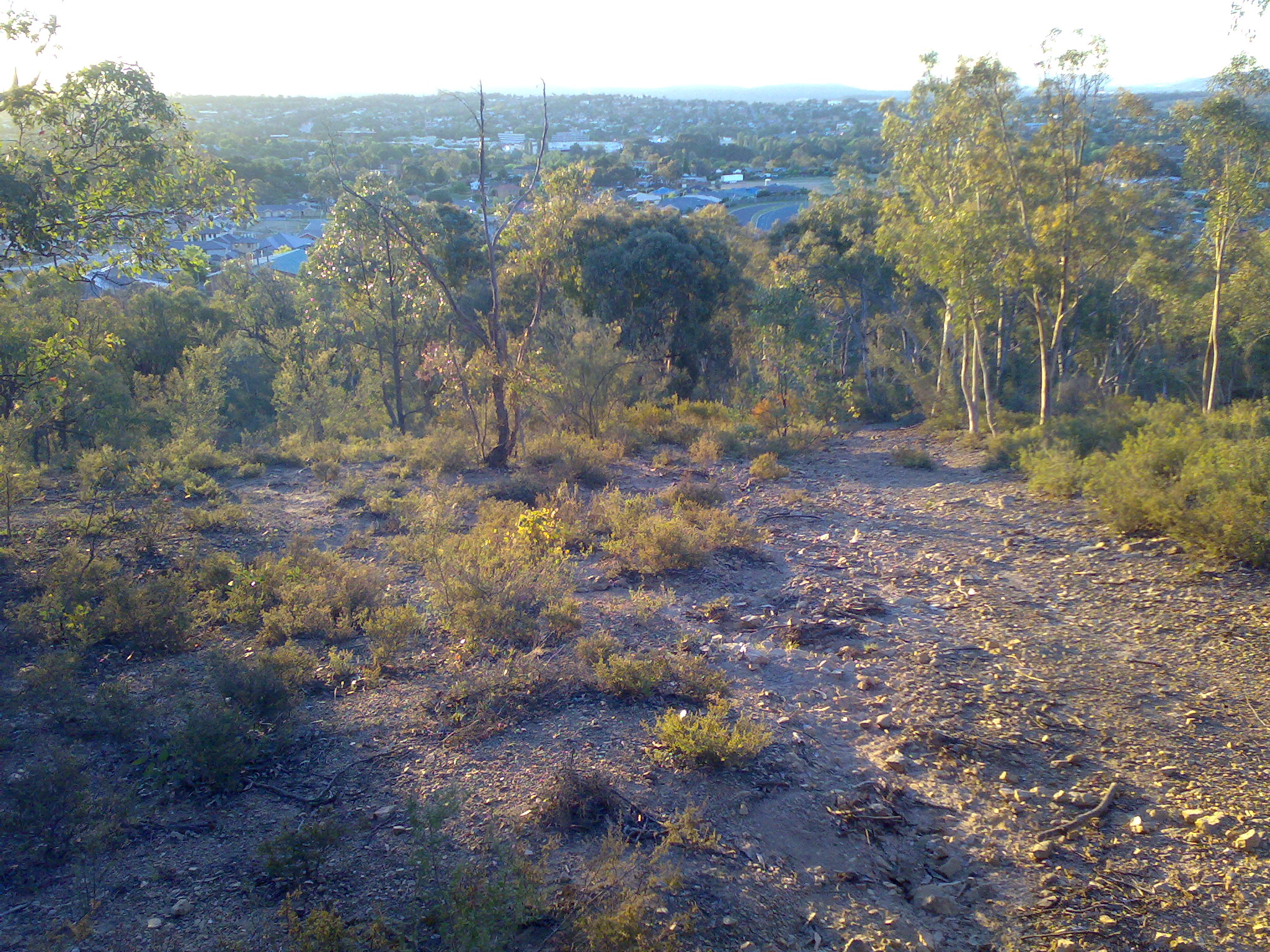
Overlooking Queanbeyan East from the city's edge

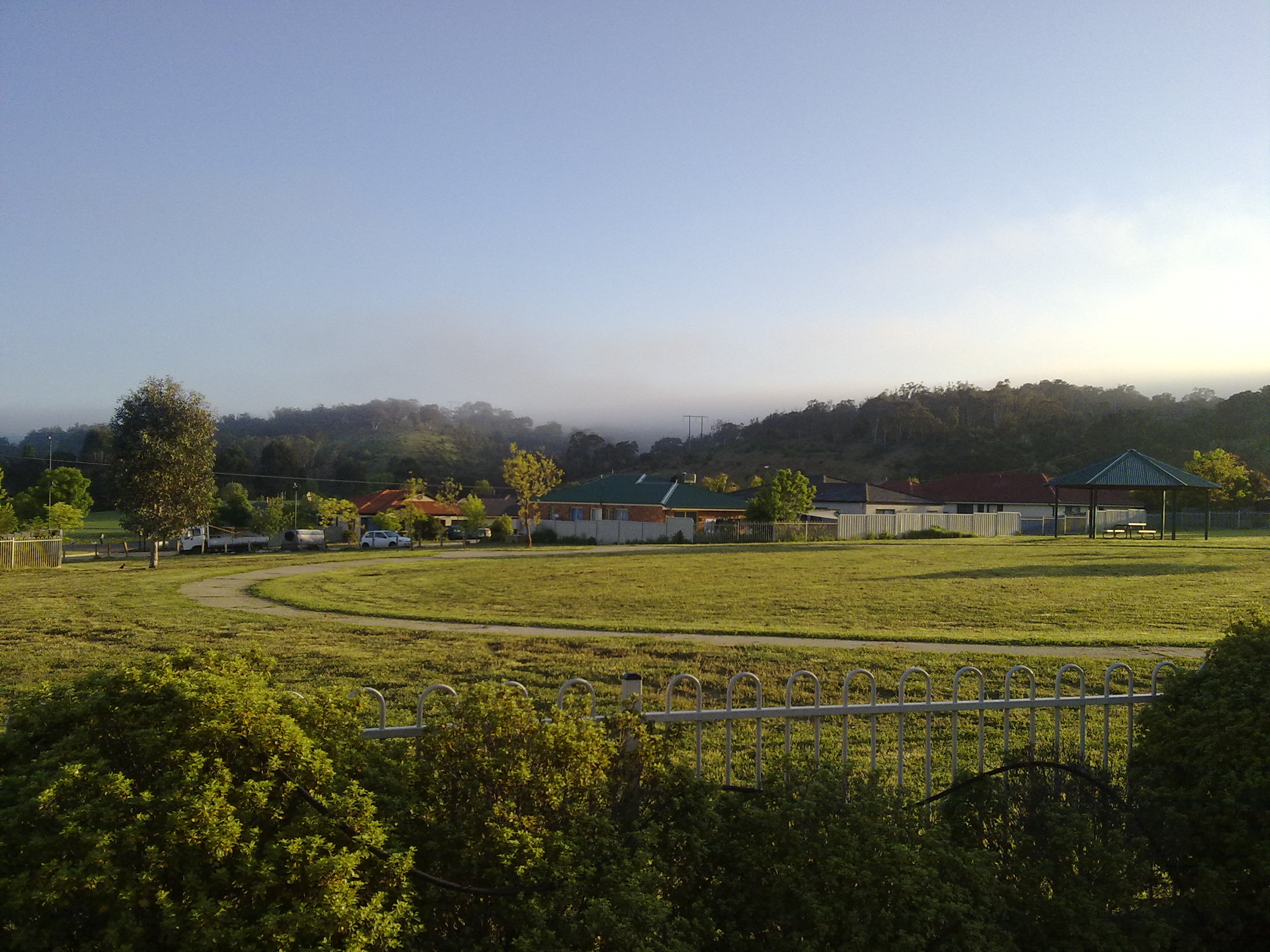
Looking towards Wright Park in Queanbeyan East from Gracelands Estate

Queanbeyan East is a suburb of Queanbeyan in New South Wales, Australia. It is on the north eastern side of the Queanbeyan River, with the river forming its western boundary. At the 2021 census, it had a population of 4,240.

== Geography ==
The suburb is a mixed residential and industrial zone, incorporating Queanbeyan's (and one of the region's largest) manufacturing and general industrial hubs along the eastern length of Yass Road.

East Queanbeyan is predominantly residential however, featuring a mix of high density units and free standing homes. In recent years a number of new mini housing estates have been completed (or are under construction), adding significantly to the population, and providing new housing stock. Additionally a new high density residential complex has been completed adjacent to the Queanbeyan River.

The Goulburn-Bombala railway passes from east to west through the north of the suburb.

== Amenities ==
The suburb contains a small general shopping strip, consisting of several major brand outlets. Queanbeyan East Public School and Queanbeyan TAFE both reside in East Queanbeyan, as do a number of significant and popular playing grounds, including the city's largest sports ground, Seiffert Oval. The suburb is notable for the number of playing grounds and general parkland within it.

Additionally, East Queanbeyan is home to a lawn bowls club, a number of restaurants, several motels, and borders the Queanbeyan Golf Club.

The River Motel Queanbeyan borders the river and is located directly opposite the Queanbeyan Leagues Club, situated across the river. The Airport Motor Inn lies just inside the city, close by the railway line which forms the border with the Australian Capital Territory.

== Heritage listings ==
Queanbeyan East has a number of heritage-listed sites, including:

- Goulburn-Bombala railway: Queanbeyan railway bridge
