= Ross Coulthart =

Australian investigative journalist and author (born 1962)

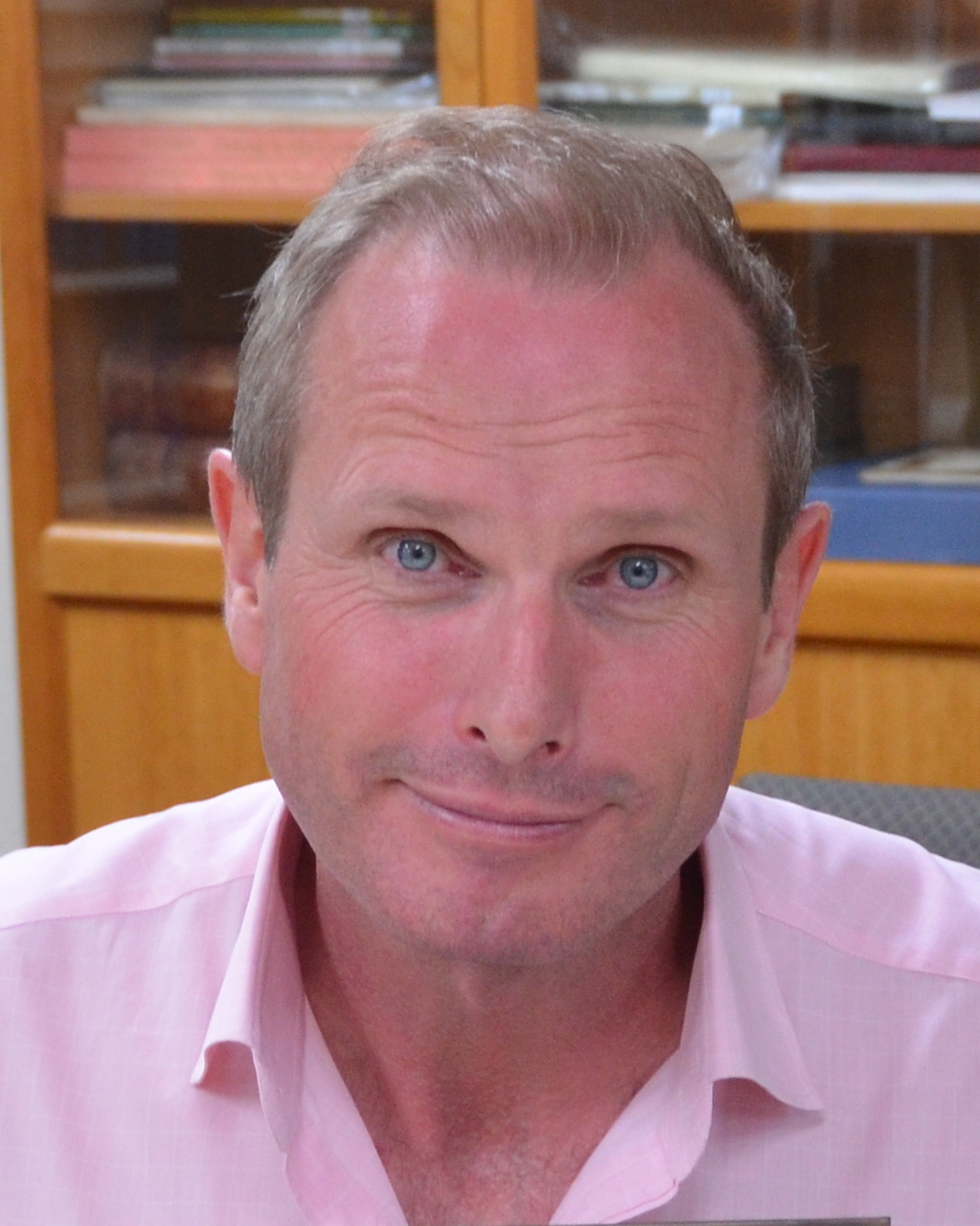
- Coulthart in 2012
- Born: 30 August 1962 (age 64); UK
- Citizenship: Australian
- Education: Victoria University of Wellington
- Occupations: journalist, author
- Website: www.rosscoulthart.com

Ross Coulthart (born 30 August 1962) is an Australian investigative journalist, author, and documentary producer. As of 2023, he is the senior special investigations correspondent for NewsNation. He believes that governments have covered up knowledge of extraterrestrial spacecraft and is an advocate for UFO disclosure.

== Early life ==
Coulthart was born in the UK, and later moved with his family to New Zealand. He graduated with a law degree from the Victoria University of Wellington and he joined The New Zealand Herald newspaper as a journalist in 1982.

== Career ==
From 1989-1992, Coulthart worked for the Mike Willesee and Jana Wendt-hosted A Current Affair public affairs program on the Australian Nine TV Network, where his investigative journalism won a Penguin Award for revealing how Qld businessman Sir Leslie Thiess paid bribes to Queensland Premier Sir Joh Bjelke-Petersen.

In 1992, Coulthart joined Four Corners, a public affairs program produced by the Australian Broadcasting Corporation. One of his investigations focused on corruption within the professional football industry in Australia. The report contributed to the establishment of the Soccer Royal Commission of Inquiry, which led to regulatory changes concerning player transfer fees for Australian players moving to overseas clubs.

On a 1994 episode of Four Corners, Coulthart broadcast an allegation that the Australian Secret Intelligence Service "secretly holds tens of thousands of files on Australian citizens, a database completely outside privacy laws". Coulthart's allegations prompted the Minister for Foreign Affairs Gareth Evans to call a "root and branch" review of the ASIS led by Justice Gordon Samuels and Mike Codd. In their Report on the Australian Secret Intelligence Service released in 1995, Coulthart's allegation was investigated and denied by Samuels and Codd, but Evans did acknowledge that "ASIS does have some files, as one would expect in an organisation of that nature, even though its brief extends to activities outside the country rather than inside. They are essentially of an administrative nature." While Samuels and Codd did find that certain grievances of former ASIS officers were well founded, they observed that the information published in the Four Corners program was "skewed towards the false", that "the level of factual accuracy about operational matters was not high", and, quoting an aphorism, that "what was disturbing was not true and what was true was not disturbing". They concluded that the disclosure of the information was unnecessary and unjustifiable and had damaged the reputation of ASIS and Australia overseas.

In 1995, Coulthart joined the Sunday public affairs program on Australia’s Nine Network, where he worked for 14 years on various investigative reports. A 1996 investigation into the operations of CARE Australia highlighted issues related to the use of government funding by charitable organizations, leading to reforms within Australia’s AusAid agency. In the same year, his report The Prisoners Who Waited, which examined corruption in government-funded Aboriginal legal services, received the 1996 Logie Award for Most Outstanding Achievement in Public Affairs. He also received the inaugural Law Council of Australia’s Law Journalist Award for his piece The Justice System on Trial, which explored aspects of the Australian legal system.

In 2002, Coulthart, together with renowned filmmaker Max Stahl, conducted an investigative report into crimes committed during the East Timor conflict, identifying members of the Indonesian military and militia who had gone unpunished for abuses against civilians. The investigation won the Gold Medal at the New York Film Festival for Best International Report.

In 2006, Coulthart’s investigative story Black & White Justice (for the Sunday program) examined hit‑and‑run deaths of Aboriginal individuals in Townsville. The reporting presented strong evidence suggesting that at least one victim—Errol Wyles—may have died in a racially motivated incident that could amount to homicide under criminal law.

In 2007, Dead Man Running, his investigation into outlaw motorcycle gang organised crime, revealed how (at a time when police were asserting there was no evidence of links between bikie gangs and organised crime) the gangs were deeply implicated in extensive illicit drug dealing across Australia.

In 2008, Coulthart wrote about an Australian medical scandal entitled The Butcher of Bega.

Coulthart’s book on outlaw motorcycle gang organised crime, Dead Man Running, co-authored with Duncan McNab, was published in 2009.

In 2010, he reinvestigated the murder of two young Australian tourists by IRA terrorists 20 years earlier.

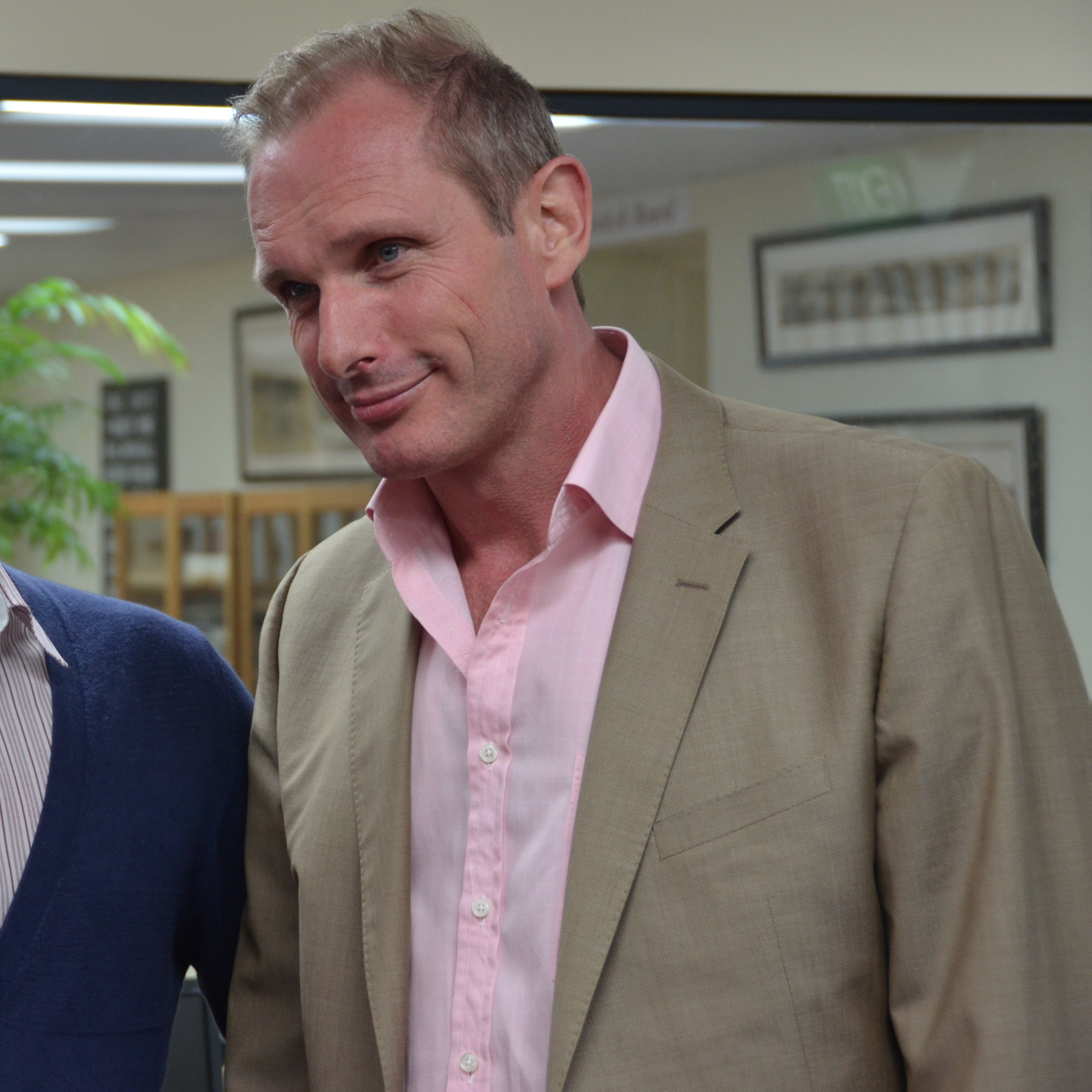
Ross Coulthart at Mosman Library, Australia in 2012

In 2014, Coulthart worked as chief investigations reporter for Channel 7's Sunday Night news program, but resigned after he reportedly "stepped in to break up a physical fight" between two producers. Coulthart worked as an investigative journalist for Australian news and current affairs program 60 Minutes on Channel Nine, but left in 2018 after his contract was not renewed.

In 2018, Coulthart was employed by a public relations firm, Cato and Clegg, where he managed the public relations for ex-soldier and accused war criminal Ben Roberts-Smith, who in 2023 was found by Justice Anthony Besanko to have participated in the murder of four Afghans.

=== UFOs ===
After leaving the PR firm Coulthart returned to reporting, focusing mainly on UFOs.

In 2021, Coulthart starred in The UFO Phenomenon, a special television series for Seven News in Australia that claimed to "unearth startling new evidence of UFOs from government officials and eyewitnesses that will change everything you thought you knew about the universe." That same year, Coulthart authored a book titled In Plain Sight: An Investigation into UFOs and Impossible Science. Author Pippa Goldschmidt said "Coulthart provides a balanced historical and global summary of UFO sightings ... Fatally for his argument, however, he shows signs of wanting to believe it." Author Jason Colavito reviewed Coulthart's book, saying it was "less a serious analysis and more of a book report on the last works of the leaders of the faith". According to The Sydney Morning Herald, the book made Coulthart something of a cult hero in American UFO circles. Maariv noted in 2023 that the book had received global media attention.

In 2022, Coulthart and co-host Bryce Zabel began hosting Need To Know, a UFOlogy podcast promoted as "revealing the mysteries of the universe to the people of the earth".

In June 2023, Coulthart conducted an interview for NewsNation with USAF officer David Grusch and joined Grusch in alleging that the U.S. federal government maintains a highly secretive UFO retrieval program and is in possession of both extraterrestrial spacecraft and the corpses of "non-human" pilots. In August 2023, the Australian Broadcasting Corporation's program Media Watch questioned the lack of evidence for Coulthart's claims that the United States government had covered up knowledge of aliens and the retrieval of alien spacecraft. In December 2023, Australian Skeptics announced that Coulthart was their 2023 Bent Spoon Award winner for his uncritical journalism concerning his belief that governments are covering up "'wreckage of downed extraterrestrial spacecraft and the bodies of their pilots.'"

In November 2023, NewsNation announced it had signed Coulthart as a special projects correspondent. His first project with the network, "Unsolved: The JFK Assassination", was released during the week of the 60th anniversary of the assassination of President John F. Kennedy.

== Awards and honors ==
- In 2008, Gold Walkley with Nick Farrow for the report Butcher of Bega: Investigation of a doctor's alleged malpractice and incompetence in Bega, which aired on Sunday on Nine Network. He has also won four non-gold Walkleys.
- Coulthart was joint winner of the 2015 Prime Minister's Prize for Australian History for Charles Bean.

== Books ==
- Coulthart, Ross; McNab, Duncan (2008). Dead Man Running: An insider's story on one of the world's most feared outlaw motorcycle gangs ... The Bandidos. Allen & Unwin. ISBN 978-1-74176-482-6.
- Coulthart, Ross; McNab, Duncan (2011). Above the Law: How Outlaw Motorcycle Gangs Became the World's Biggest Criminal Empire. Allen & Unwin. ISBN 978-1-74237-900-5.
- Coulthart, Ross (2016). The Lost Diggers. HarperCollins Publishers. ISBN 978-1-4607-5208-1.
- Coulthart, Ross (2016). The Lost Tommies. William Collins. ISBN 978-0-00-810331-6.
- Coulthart, Ross (2021). Charles Bean. HarperCollins Publishers Australia. ISBN 978-0-7322-9788-6.
- Coulthart, Ross (2021). In Plain Sight: An Investigation Into UFOs and Impossible Science. HarperCollins Publishers Australia. ISBN 978-1-4607-5906-6. (reprinted 2023)
