= 1991 New South Wales local elections =

Local government elections in New South Wales, Australia

← 1987	14 September 1991	1995 →

The 1991 New South Wales local elections were held on 14 September 1991 to elect the councils of the local government areas (LGAs) of New South Wales, Australia.

This was the final election where Town and Shire Clerks acted as returning officers under the direction of the New South Wales Electoral Commissioner. Starting in 1995, independent returning officers were appointed for local elections.
