= 1987 New South Wales local elections =

Local government elections in New South Wales, Australia

← 1983	26 September 1987	1991 →

The 1987 New South Wales local elections were held on 26 September 1987 to elect the councils of the local government areas (LGAs) of New South Wales, Australia.

No election was held in September for Warringah Shire Council, which instead held an election on 14 March 1987 after the council was dismissed in 1985. A total of 61 candidates contested the 12 councillor positions in Warringah, including endorsed National Party candidates (who did not win a single seat) and at least one Independent Labor candidate. Seven councillors from the previous council were returned to office, including shire president Ted Jackson.

This was the first election where Town and Shire Clerks acted as returning officers under the direction of the New South Wales Electoral Commissioner.

== Background ==
On 11 March 1987, Shoalhaven mayor Harry Sawkins died from a heart attack. A by-election was not held due to the proximity of the local elections, whicH Sawkins was planning to contest.

=== Sydney City Council dismissal ===
The election for Sydney City Council was delayed until 1988 after the council was dismissed over allegations of impropriety by lord mayor Doug Sutherland. At the time, Redfern Ward alderman Clover Moore was considering contesting the mayoral election. Instead, she contested and won the seat of Bligh at the 1988 state election before eventually becoming lord mayor in 2004.

== Results ==
Independent candidates made major gains across the state.

The Liberal Party lost control of Waverley Council to a number of Labor Party candidates. Although The Australian Jewish Times reported at the time that the Waverley Action Committee had won two seats, it appears they had instead lost all their seats by the time the results were declared.
