= The Ridgeway, New South Wales =

The Ridgeway
- Suburb
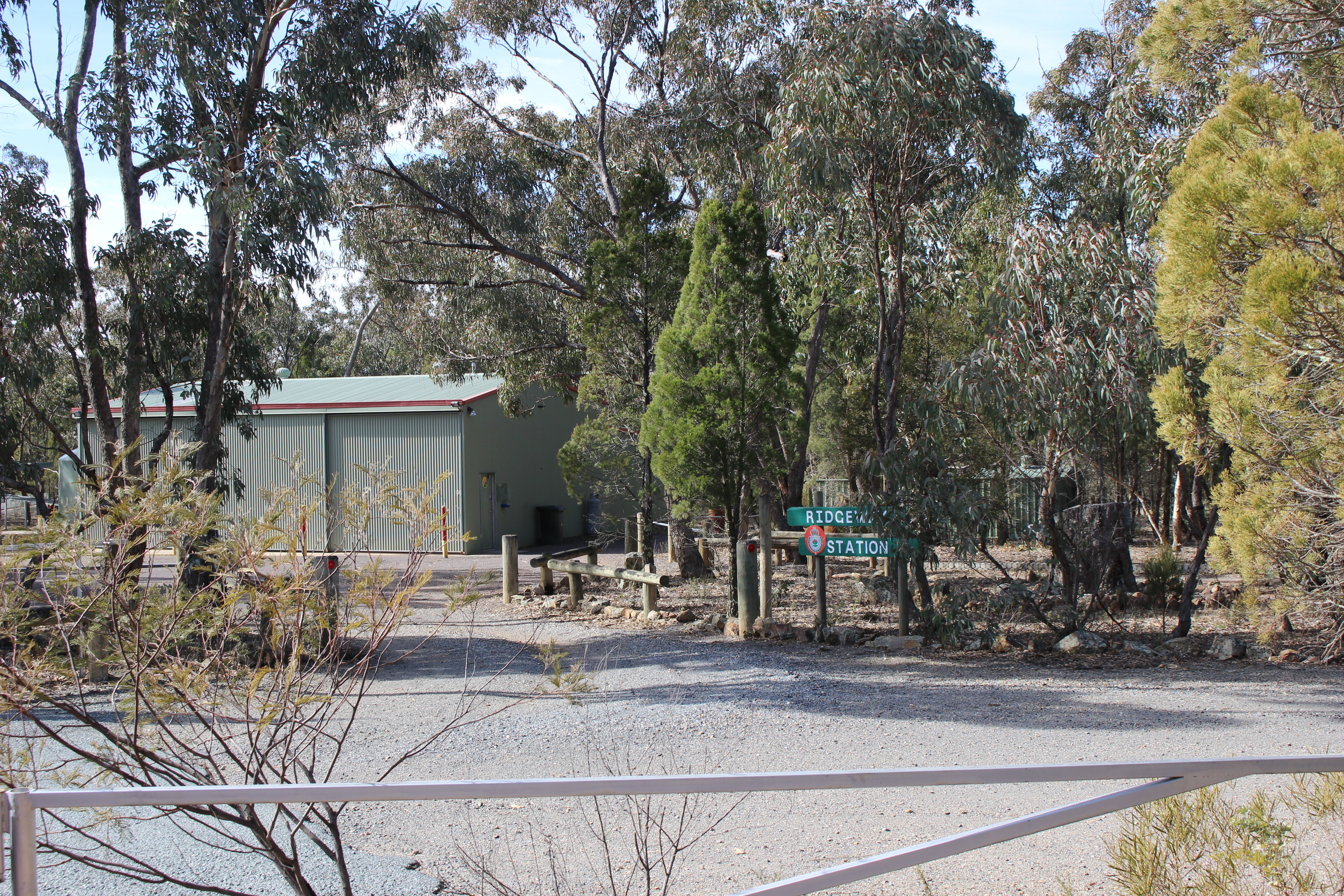
- The fire station

- Interactive map of The Ridgeway
- Coordinates: 35°20′22″S 149°15′33″E
- Country: Australia
- State: New South Wales
- City: Queanbeyan
- LGA: Queanbeyan-Palerang Regional Council

Government
  - State electorate: Monaro
  - Federal division: Eden-Monaro

Population
  - Total: 162 (2021 census)
- Postcode: 2620
- County: Murray
- Parish: Queanbeyan
Suburbs around The Ridgeway
| Majura | Kowen | Kowen |
| Majura | The Ridgeway | Carwoola |
| Queanbeyan East | Greenleigh | Carwoola |

The Ridgeway is a suburb just outside of Queanbeyan, New South Wales, Australia. People commonly mistake it for being a part of Queanbeyan, but it is part of the Queanbeyan-Palerang region, not the city of Queanbeyan. It is located on a ridge to the east of the central business district (CBD) on the Kings Highway. When it was established it was part of the Yarrowlumla Shire. At the 2021 census, it had a population of 162.
