= Graeme Stephen Reeves =

Former gynaecologist and obstetrician in Australia (born 1949)

- Known for: Deregistration; malpractice; alleged crimes against patients
- Medical career
- Profession: Former doctor
- Institutions: Hornsby Ku-ring-gai Hospital, Pambula Hospital, Bega Hospital
- Sub-specialties: Gynaecology and obstetrics

Graeme Stephen Reeves (born 1949) is an Australian former gynaecologist and obstetrician, nickname the Butcher of Bega in the press. Reeves was deregistered in 2004 for performing obstetric procedures at Pambula and Bega hospitals despite being banned from obstetrics, and in September 2008 was charged in relation to alleged sexual and indecent assaults and genital mutilation at Bega, Pambula and Richmond between 2001 and 2003. He was sentenced in relation to assaults in 2011.

== Medical career ==
=== Northern Sydney ===
Reeves worked in several northern Sydney hospitals in obstetrics from 1985 until 1997 when his obstetrics practice was restricted, and in gynaecology until 2000.

Reeves was first appointed as a visiting medical officer in obstetrics and gynaecology at Hornsby Ku-ring-gai Hospital on 20 December 1985. 35 complaints were made about him over a fifteen-year period starting in June 1986 by other doctors, nurses and patients, and included complaints of bullying other staff and patients and failing to offer adequate pain relief. In 1995 two attending midwives and a paediatric registrar complained that Reeves had bullied a patient delivering a non-viable foetus, had not offered adequate pain relief and had declined their offers to resuscitate her. In May 1996 a patient of Reeves' at The Hills Private Hospital died of septicaemia after he refused antibiotics, and that hospital suspended his privileges as a medical officer there. The Hills Hospital also noted his aggressive conduct and observed that similar problems were known from both Hornsby Ku-ring-gai and Sydney Adventist Hospital.

By January 1997 a hospital advisory committee had made an adverse finding about Reeves and a Professional Standards Committee handed down a decision in August placing limits on Reeves' practice in obstetrics. The hospital suspended him from the gynaecology clinic on 14 December 2000 after midwives refused to work with him and his position was never restored.

Psychiatric reports dating from as early as 1996 and continuing until 2004 report that Reeves has been variously identified as having narcissistic personality disorder.

=== Greater Southern Area Health Service ===
Despite the restrictions on his practice, Reeves practised obstetrics in Greater Southern Area Health Service (GSAHS) hospitals in the South Coast region of New South Wales from April 2002 until January 2003, and gynaecology until the termination of his contract in July 2003.

Reeves was hired as an obstetrician and gynaecologist by GSAHS in 2002, beginning work in April. Reeves' application for the position provided partial information about restrictions on his registration, but not the Professional Standards Committee's order that he not practice obstetrics. GSAHS did not verify with the Medical Board that Reeves was allowed to practice in the specialties he was hired for. The restriction on his practice was revealed during a reference check in April, but not acted on. His hiring was promoted by local papers as a boon for women in the area.

By the end of 2002, complaints and memos were prepared about difficult working relationships between Reeves and staff at Pambula Hospital. In November, discussions between the Medical Board and GSAHS revealed that Reeves was not allowed to practice as an obstetrician, and as a result from 14 November Pambula Hospital did not provide obstetric services. In 2003 there were complaints that Reeves had provided obstetric services to a patient at Bega Hospital on 3 January, and GSAHS became aware that, Reeves' undertaking to the contrary, he had not applied to the Board for a review of the restriction on his obstetric practice. On 10 January further complaints about Reeves' conduct towards other staff became known to Bega Hospital management, but as they were pursuing his unauthorised practice of obstetrics, these complaints about conduct were not pursued.

After the complaints about unauthorised obstetric practice at Bega Hospital, GSAHS continued to allow Reeves to practice as a gynaecologist, uncertain as to whether they had the power to suspend him. On 18 February 2003, the Medical Board ordered that Reeves' ban from obstetric practice continue and on 7 April GSAHS notified Reeves of the forthcoming termination of his contract, although Reeves continued to provide gynaecological services up to 11 July, the last day of his contract.

Jon Mortimer, the GSAHS Deputy Director of Medical Services, was suspended on full pay in May 2008 for failing to act on the information about Reeves' obstetrics ban revealed in the April 2002 reference check.

=== Deregistration ===
Reeves was struck from the register of doctors (forbidden to practice medicine) in 2004, on the grounds that he had breached the Medical Board's 1997 ban on his practising obstetrics, and had thus been guilty of gross misconduct.

== Media reports ==
The first public media report alleging further serious misconduct by Reeves while employed by GSAHS was on 17 February 2008, in a broadcast of the Sunday programme on the Nine Network, led by investigative journalist, Ross Coulthart. Reeves' former patient Carolyn Dewaegeneire alleged that in 2002 Reeves had conducted a clitoridectomy rather than remove a small genital lesion, and had informed her that he was going to do so seconds before anaesthesia took effect. Expert witnesses in an earlier civil case surrounding this procedure noted that the procedure Reeves performed on Dewaegeneire was old-fashioned, that informed consent was not given and that Reeves should have sought a second opinion on her rare diagnosis.

The media began to report additional complaints by Reeves' patients in February 2008, such as Marilyn Hawkins' allegation that he both sexually assaulted her and botched her operation. By 25 February private lobbying group the Medical Errors Action Group reported that they had complaints related to 185 separate incidents. By 26 February Reeves, who had been living in Castle Hill, had gone into hiding.

== Political response ==
In June 2008, the Medical Practice Amendment Bill 2008 obliged doctors in New South Wales to report serious misconduct on the part of their colleagues, specifically intoxication while practising, sexual abuse while practising and large violations of professional standards of care.

=== NSW Health Department review ===
On 2 May 2008, retired judge Deirdre O'Connor reported to the NSW Health Department on procedural aspects of Reeves' appointment and was satisfied that changes made to Health Department hiring policy since Reeve's appointment at Southern Area Health Service were sufficient to end the practice of doctors like him much earlier in future. The report contradicted Health Minister Reba Meagher's claims that the GSAHS had done no background checks on Reeves. The State Government was criticised for not releasing the report until 28 May.

== Medical community response ==
The Medical Board stated that the allegations had not been raised at the time of his de-registration, and as Reeves was no longer allowed to practice, there was no further sanction that the Board was capable of making. In late February 2008 the NSW Department of Health established counselling services for former patients of Reeves. General practitioners in Bega complained that the press had created an unfair suspicion surrounding the local medical community and maintained that they had not been aware of any dissatisfaction with Reeves during his employment by GSAHS.

== Investigations of criminal activity ==
=== Police investigations ===
The NSW Police established Strike Force Tarella on 27 February 2008, comprising 12 detectives from both the Child Protection and Sex Crimes Squad and the far south coast local area command. By May, they were investigating deaths of ten babies and seven women under Reeves' care, with most of the babies classified as stillborn, which did not require a coronial inquiry into their deaths.

=== Garling Commission ===
In May 2008 Reeves made a statement to a Special Commission of Inquiry into the public health system stating that he had worked illegally at the GSAHS hospitals because he felt his help was badly needed. He also expressed regret for his actions. The Commission, headed by Peter Garling, was convened in January 2008 and its scope is to investigate the standard of patient care in public hospitals.

On 31 July 2008, Garling handed down his findings on the Reeves case and concluded that his "intentional and calculated dishonesty" was the main reason he was employed by GSAHS. Garling recommended that the case be referred to the Director of Public Prosecutions. The report also found that Jon Mortimer and Robert Arthurson of GSAHS should have carried out greater background checks of Reeves.

=== Extortion attempt ===
In June 2008, three people were charged in Bega Local Court with an extortion attempt against an unnamed former colleague of Reeves'. They had threatened to make the connection between Reeves and the colleague public. Two of the three, mother and son Kathryn and Luke Nathan Fisher, pleaded guilty in May 2009 and were placed on good behaviour bonds. Charges against Benjamin Fisher were withdrawn.

== Criminal charges and trial ==
In September 2008 police announced that they were laying 17 criminal charges against Reeves, relating to 10 alleged victims at Bega, Pambula and Richmond between 2001 and 2003. He was arrested the morning of 10 September and refused bail, to reappear in court in November. In April 2009 his Legal Aid lawyers sought an adjournment of his Downing Local Court trial in order to familiarise themselves with the case and in August 2009 he was ordered to stand trial after waiving a committal hearing. In December 2009 Reeves was arrested on additional charges to those laid in 2008.

On 10 March 2011 a NSW District Court found him guilty of maliciously inflicting grievous bodily harm on Carolyn DeWaegeneire, whose genitals he removed without her consent. On 1 July he was sentenced for a two to three-and-a-half-year period for the assault on DeWaegeneire and other patients, together with the financial deception involved in practising obstetrics in Bega without registration. The Director of Public Prosecutions announced an intention to appeal the sentence later that month.

Reeves was released from jail on 20 December 2013 after an appeal to the High Court.
