= Ministry of Health (New South Wales) =

Australian state government department

NSW Health

Department overview
- Formed: 1914; 112 years ago
- Preceding agencies: Department of Public Health; Health Commission of NSW; New South Wales Department of Health
- Jurisdiction: New South Wales
- Headquarters: 1 Reserve Road, St Leonards
- Employees: 100,000 (2011)
- Annual budget: A$17.3 billion (2011–2012)
- Ministers responsible: The Hon. Ryan Park MP, Minister for Health; Minister for Regional Health; The Hon. Rose Jackson MLC, Minister for Mental Health
- Department executive: Susan Pearce, Secretary
- Child agencies: Office of Medical Research; Health Care Complaints Commission; Health Professional Councils Authority; NSW Ambulance; Cancer Institute of NSW
- Website: www.health.nsw.gov.au

The New South Wales Ministry of Health, branded NSW Health, is a ministerial department of the New South Wales Government. NSW Health supports the executive and statutory roles of the Ministers for Health, Regional Health, Mental Health, and Medical Research. The Ministry also monitors the performance of the state-wide health organisations that collectively make up NSW Health. It is primarily responsible for the public health system in New South Wales, particularly through public hospitals as well as associated agencies and statutory authorities, such as the NSW Ambulance service.

The provision of health services within the state is assigned to fifteen local health districts, who operate based on area, and two specialist networks, who operate based on other criteria. Together, these public health organisations provide services in a wide range of settings, from major metropolitan hospitals to primary care posts in the remote outback, as well as specialist custodial health services or children and paediatric services.

== Leadership ==
The Ministry is led by its Secretary. Susan Pearce AM was appointed Secretary of NSW Health in March 2022. The Secretary reports to the following Ministers, who are responsible for the administration of the laws:

- Minister for Health
- Minister for Regional Health
- Minister for Mental Health
- Minister for Medical Research

== Divisions ==
The Ministry is the executive department for the public health system within the state of NSW. The system consists of fifteen local health districts, which operate based on area, six statutory health corporations, including two specialty networks which operate based on patient criteria, and thirteen affiliated health organisations.

=== Local Health Districts ===
Local health districts are led by a board, members of which are appointed by the Ministers, and a chief executive, who is a member of the board appointed to the position with the consent of the Secretary. Local health districts operate based on geographical region, typically consisting of multiple local government areas, and are responsible for all of the public hospitals and other public health services within their region. They are responsible for the coordination and governance of these health services, the planning, investigation and assessment of local health needs, their workforce (despite not being permitted to employ staff in their own right), and other operational and clinical aspects of public health.

The areas which local health districts serve are defined by reference to local government areas, and for two districts an area not governed by a local government area. The 2016 local government amalgamations had a minor effect on the boundaries of the South Western Sydney and Sydney local health districts, due to the merger of the cities of Bankstown and Canterbury, however as the legislation defining the boundaries of the districts was not changed, these two districts continue to administer the areas which were formerly councils.

As of October 2024, the local health districts and their corresponding local government areas were:

- Central Coast Local Health District, consisting of the Central Coast Council (previously the City of Gosford and Wyong Shire).
- Far West Local Health District, consisting of Balranald Shire, the City of Broken Hill, Central Darling Shire, Wentworth Shire, and the Unincorporated Far West Region.
- Hunter New England Local Health District, consisting of:
  - the cities of Cessnock, Lake Macquarie, Maitland, and Newcastle;
  - the councils of Glen Innes Severn, the Mid-Coast (previously the Gloucester Shire and the Councils of the Great Lakes and the City of Greater Taree), Port Stephens, and Singleton;
  - the regional councils of Armidale (previously the Shires of Armidale Dumaresq and Guyra) and Tamworth;
  - the shires of Dungog, Gunnedah, Gwydir, Inverell, Liverpool Plains, Moree Plains, Muswellbrook, Narrabri, the Upper Hunter, Uralla, and Walcha; and
  - part of Tenterfield Shire.
- Illawarra Shoalhaven Local Health District, consisting of Municipality of Kiama, and the Cities of Shellharbour, Shoalhaven, and Wollongong.
- Mid North Coast Local Health District, consisting of Bellingen Shire, the City of Coffs Harbour, the Port Macquarie-Hastings Council (previously the Hastings Council), Kempsey Shire, and the Nambucca Valley Council.
- Murrumbidgee Local Health District, consisting of:
  - the cities of Albury, Griffith, and Wagga Wagga;
  - the councils of the Edward River (previously the Conargo Shire and Deniliquin Council), Federation (previously the Corowa and Urana Shires), Hilltops (previously the shires of Boorowa, Harden, and Young), the Murray River (previously the shires of Murray and Wakool), Murrumbidgee (previously the shires of the namesake and Jerilderie), and the Snowy Valleys (previously the shires of Tumbarumba and Tumut);
  - the regional council of Cootamundra–Gundagai Regional Council (previously the name-sake shires);
  - the shires of Berrigan, Bland, Carrathool, Coolamon, the Greater Hume, Hay, Junee, Leeton, Lockhart, Narrandera, and Temora; and
  - part of Lachlan Shire.
- Nepean Blue Mountains Local Health District, consisting of the cities of Blue Mountains, Lithgow, Hawkesbury, and Penrith.
- Northern NSW Local Health District, consisting of Ballina Shire, Byron Shire, the Clarence Valley Council, Kyogle Council, City of Lismore, Richmond Valley Council, the remainder of Tenterfield Shire, and Tweed Shire.
- Northern Sydney Local Health District, consisting of:
  - the cities of Ryde and Willoughby;
  - the councils of Ku-ring-gai, Lane Cove, Mosman, North Sydney, the Northern Beaches (previously the Manly, Pittwater and Warringah councils);
  - Hornsby Shire; and
  - the Municipality of Hunter's Hill.
- South Eastern Sydney Local Health District, consisting of:
  - the City of Randwick;
  - the councils of Bayside (previously City of Botany Bay, City of Rockdale), Georges River (previously City of Hurstville and City of Kogarah), and Waverley;
  - the Municipality of Woollahra;
  - Sutherland Shire; and
  - part of the City of Sydney, along with Lord Howe Island.
- South Western Sydney Local Health District, consisting of:
  - the cities of Bankstown (as a part of the City of Canterbury-Bankstown), Campbelltown, Fairfield, and Liverpool;
  - the council of Camden; and
  - the shires of Wingecarribee and Wollondilly.
- Southern NSW Local Health District, consisting of:
  - the councils of Goulburn Mulwaree and Yass Valley;
  - the regional councils of Queanbeyan–Palerang (previously the City of the former and the Council of the latter), and Snowy Monaro (previously the shires of Bombala, Cooma-Monaro, and the Snowy River); and
  - the shires of Bega Valley, Eurobodalla, and the Upper Lachlan.
- Sydney Local Health District, consisting of:
  - the cities of Canada Bay and Canterbury (as a part of the City of Canterbury-Bankstown);
  - the council of the Inner West (previously the municipalities of Ashfield and Leichhardt and Marrickville Council);
  - the municipalities of Burwood and Strathfield; and
  - part of the City of Sydney
- Western NSW Local Health District, consisting of:
  - the City of Orange;
  - the councils of Cabonne and Oberon;
  - the regional councils of Bathurst, Dubbo Regional Council (including the former Wellington Council), and the Mid-Western;
  - the shires of Blayney, Bogan, Bourke, Brewarrina, Cobar, Coonamble, Cowra, Forbes, Gilgandra, Narromine, Parkes, Walgett, Warrumbungle, and Weddin; and
  - the remainder of Lachlan Shire.
- Western Sydney Local Health District, consisting of Cumberland City Council (incorporating parts of the former cities of Auburn and Holroyd), The Hills Shire (formerly Baulkham Hills Shire), Blacktown City Council, and the City of Parramatta.

=== Specialty Networks ===
The purpose of the specialty networks (also called 'statutory health corporations') is to provide services to target populations regardless of their area. These networks are as follows.

- The Justice Health and Forensic Mental Health Network, responsible for providing health services to inmates, adult or juvenile, held in prisons in New South Wales, as well as to forensic mental health patients, who have been involuntarily committed after committing a criminal offence as a result of a plea of insanity. This is contrast to those patients who are involuntarily committed by the civil courts, without having committed a crime, which are the responsibility of the local health districts, under the Mental Health Act 2007 (NSW).
- The Sydney Children's Hospitals Network (Randwick and Westmead), with the specialised focus of children and paediatrics.

=== State-wide Health Services ===
- NSW Ambulance
- NSW Health Pathology
- Health Protection NSW
- NSW Organ & Tissue Donation Service
- Cancer Institute NSW

=== Other Statutory Health Corporations ===
- Agency for Clinical Innovation
- Bureau of Health Information
- Clinical Excellence Commission
- Health Education and Training Institute NSW (HETI)

=== Shared Services ===
- HealthShare NSW
- eHealth NSW
- Health Infrastructure

== Health Professional Councils ==
- Chinese Medicine Council of New South Wales
- Chiropractic Council of New South Wales
- Dental Council of New South Wales
- Medical Council of New South Wales
- Medical Radiation Practice Council of New South Wales
- Nursing and Midwifery Council of New South Wales
- Occupational Therapy Council of New South Wales
- Optometry Council of New South Wales
- Osteopathy Council of New South Wales
- Pharmacy Council of New South Wales
- Physiotherapy Council of New South Wales
- Podiatry Council of New South Wales
- Psychology Council of New South Wales

== See also ==
- Minister for Health (New South Wales)
