= Kowen =

- Interactive map of Kowen
- Coordinates: 35.31078°S 149.31367°E
- Country: Australia
- State: Australian Capital Territory

Government
  - Territory electorate: Kurrajong
  - Federal division: Fenner

Area
  - Total: 77.0 km^{2} (29.7 sq mi)

Population
  - Total: 38 (2016 census)
  - Density: 0.494/km^{2} (1.278/sq mi)
- Postcode: 2609
Localities around Kowen
Majura	Wamboin	Bungendore
Majura	Kowen	Bungendore
Queanbeyan	Carwoola	Hoskinstown

Kowen is a district in the Australian Capital Territory in Australia. It is situated in the northeast corner of the ACT, to the east of Sutton Road and the town of Queanbeyan, New South Wales. Kowen is primarily covered by pine forests, and is also used for farming. The main highway between the ACT and the south coast region, the Kings Highway, runs directly through the Kowen.

The 1966 Act describes the Kowen District as being:

All that part of the Australian Capital Territory commencing at the intersection of the middle thread of Sutton Road with the generally northeastern boundary of the Territory; and bounded thence by generally northeastern, eastern and southern boundaries of the Territory generally southeasterly, southerly and westerly, respectively, to the middle thread of Sutton Road; thence by part of the middle thread of Sutton Road generally northeasterly to the point of commencement.

The area is well known to mountain bikers as the site of the Sparrow Hill mountain biking area, an eastern enclave of Kowen Forest. A new 5 km alignment of the Kings Highway was constructed in 2010–11 to improve the safety of the road. The new section divides Sparrow Hill into two parts, and includes overtaking lanes in both directions, and bypasses a dangerous, winding section of road, including at least six bends.

== Early settlers ==
Some of the early settlers in the district prior to the establishment of the Australian Capital Territory made their homes on the Kowen district. Luke and Mary Colverwell settled in a cottage on the banks of Glenburn Creek in what is now known as Kowen Forest.

== Kowen Forest pine plantation ==
Kowen is perhaps best known for its large pine plantations, known as Kowen Forest. A combined softwood plantation and firewood forest was established at Kowen in about 1926, on land described as otherwise useless. An additional 100 acres of pinus insignis were planted at Kowen in 1928 as part of a 1,000 acre expansion of pine plantations across the new Federal Territory district. When most of Canberra's forest estate was destroyed in the January 2003 bushfire, the Kowen plantation was the only forest that remained undamaged.

== HQJOC ==
The Australian Defence Force joint command and control facility, known as Headquarters Joint Operations Command (HQJOC), is situated adjacent to the Kowen District, about halfway between the towns of Queanbeyan and Bungendore.

== Future development ==
Residential development in the Kowen district has not been ruled out as part of the Australian Capital Territory's future expansion. Although the ACT's urban expansion needs for the foreseeable future will be accommodated by Gungahlin and the new Molonglo Valley development, the ACT Spatial Plan acknowledges that if the population of the ACT continues to grow beyond the capacity of these areas, further settlement will occur on the Kowen Plateau. Development of the Majura Parkway to the north of Canberra Airport would provide key access to the area.
