= Secretary of New South Wales Health =

Australian state government executive

- Incumbent; Susan Pearce since March 2022
- Appointer: New South Wales Minister for Health
- Inaugural holder: Robert Thomas Paton
- Formation: 1914

The secretary of New South Wales (NSW) Health is the chief executive of the NSW Ministry of Health. The Secretary oversees the day-to-day operation of the ministry and directly reports to the minister for health.

The secretary has overall operational responsibility for the management and oversight of the NSW Ministry of Health. The secretary chairs critical management meetings for the system and meets with chief executives from the entire state health system, among others.

== History ==
The inaugural director-general of NSW Health was Robert Thomas Paton, who was appointed in 1913.

== Functions ==
The main functions and responsibilities of the secretary for NSW Health are defined per section 122 of the NSW Health Services Act 1997 These are:

- (a) to facilitate the achievement and maintenance of adequate standards of patient care within public hospitals and in relation to other services provided by the public health system,
- (b) to facilitate the efficient and economic operation of the public health system consistent with the standards referred to in paragraph (a),
- (c) to inquire into the administration, management and services of any public health organisation,
  - (c1) to provide governance, oversight and control of the public health system and the statutory health organisations within it,
- (d) to cause public health organisations (including public hospitals controlled by them) to be inspected from time to time,
- (e) to recommend to the Minister what sums of money (if any) should be paid from money appropriated from the Consolidated Fund in any financial year to any public health organisation,
- (f) to enter into performance agreements with public health organisations, to review the results of organisations under such agreements and to report those results (and make recommendations about the results) to the Minister,
  - (f1) to give directions to statutory health organisations,
- (g) such other functions as may be conferred or imposed by or under this Act.

Further functions allocated to the secretary can be found in sections 67K, 67U, 67Z, 116D, 116H, 123, 126, 126B and 134.

== List of directors-general and secretaries of NSW Health ==
Secretary	Period	Background
Robyn Kruk	2002–2008	Public servant
Mary Foley	2011–2016	Businessperson
Elizabeth Koff	2016–2022	Public servant
Susan Pearce	2022–present	Nurse
