= 1971 New South Wales local elections =

Local government elections in New South Wales, Australia

- 18 September 1971

The 1971 New South Wales local elections were held on 18 September 1971 to elect the councils of the local government areas (LGAs) of New South Wales.

== Electoral system ==
The elections used optional preferential voting. The majority of mayors were elected by councillors at council meetings, although some were directly elected.

This was the last time 18-year-olds were unable to vote at New South Wales local elections, with the Whitlam federal government lowering the voting age from 21 in 1973. Voting was not compulsory.
