= City of Queanbeyan =

Former local government area in New South Wales, Australia

- Local government area
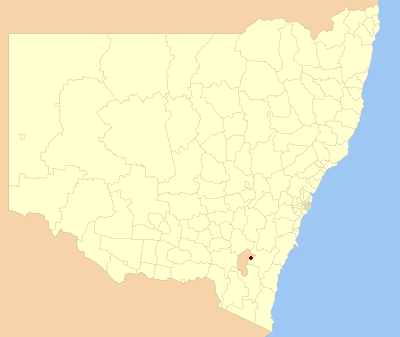
- Location in New South Wales
- Coordinates: 35°21′S 149°13′E
- Country: Australia
- State: New South Wales
- Region: Southern Tablelands
- Abolished: 12 May 2016
- Council seat: Queanbeyan

Government
  - Last Mayor: Tim Overall
  - State electorate: Monaro
  - Federal division: Eden-Monaro

Area
  - Total: 172 km^{2} (66 sq mi)

Population
  - Total: 40,568 (2013 est)
  - Density: 235.9/km^{2} (610.9/sq mi)
- Website: City of Queanbeyan
LGAs around City of Queanbeyan
| ACT | ACT | Palerang |
| ACT | City of Queanbeyan | Palerang |
| ACT | Palerang | Palerang |

Queanbeyan City was a local government area located in south eastern New South Wales, Australia. The former area is located adjacent to Canberra and the Australian Capital Territory, the Queanbeyan River, the Molonglo River, the Kings Highway and the Sydney-Canberra railway.

On 12 May 2016, the Minister for Local Government announced dissolution of Queanbeyan City with immediate effect. Together with the Palerang Council the combined council areas were merged to establish the Queanbeyan-Palerang Regional Council.

The last mayor of the Queanbeyan City Council was Tim Overall, an independent politician.

== Cities, towns and localities ==
The Queanbeyan City Council area included the suburbs and villages of:

- Carwoola
- Crestwood
- Environa
- Googong
- Greenleigh
- Jerrabomberra
- Karabar
- Queanbeyan East
- Queanbeyan West
- Queanbeyan
- The Ridgeway
- Royalla
- Tralee

In 1998 Queanbeyan Council applied to have the localities of Letchworth, Larmer, Dodsworth and De Salis recognised as suburbs and these names were assigned by the Geographical Names Board of New South Wales. A more recent Council has had these names withdrawn.

== Council ==
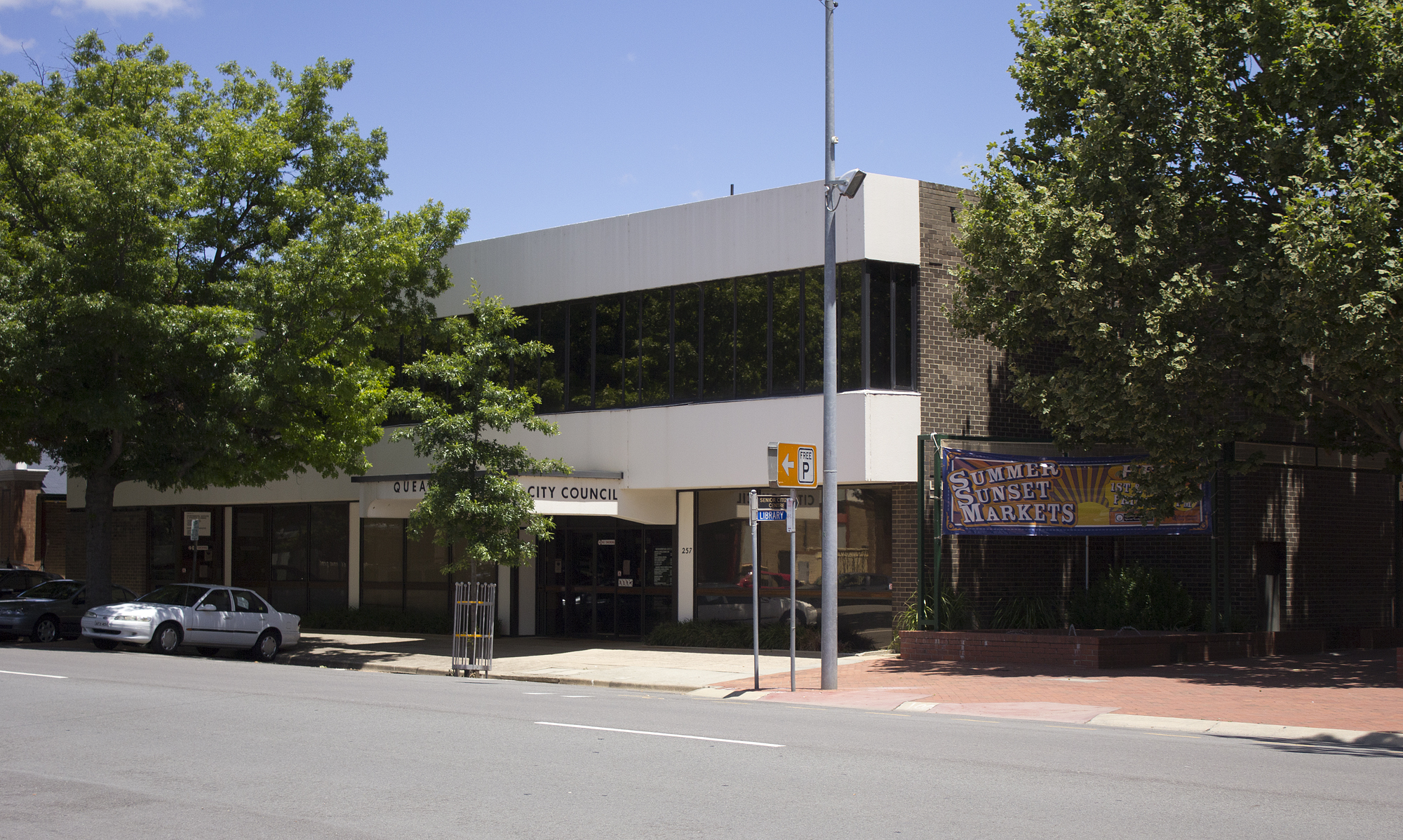
Former Queanbeyan City Council Chambers in Crawford Street (December 2011)

=== Composition and election method ===
Until its dissolution, the Queanbeyan City Council was composed of ten councillors, including the mayor, for a fixed four-year term of office. The mayor was directly elected while the nine other councillors were elected proportionally as one entire ward. As of the election held on 8 September 2012, the makeup of the last council, including the mayor, was as follows:

| Party | Councillors |
|---|---|
| Independents and Unaligned | 6 |
| Labor Party | 3 |
| Australian Democrats | 1 |
| Total | 10 |

The last Council, elected in 2012 and dissolved in 2016, in order of election, was:

| Councillor | Party | Notes |
|---|---|---|
| Tim Overall | Independent | Mayor |
| Trudy Taylor | Independent | Elected on Tim Overall's ticket |
| Brian Brown | Labor | |
| Jamie Cregan | Independent | |
| Sue Whelan | Independent | |
| Velice Trajanoski | Independent | Elected on Tim Overall's ticket |
| Peter Bray | Independent | Elected on Tim Overall's ticket |
| Toni McLennan | Australian Democrats | Elected on Tim Overall's ticket |
| Judith Burfoot | Labor | Elected on Brian Brown's ticket |
| Kenrick Winchester | Labor | |

=== Past Mayors of Queanbeyan ===
| Councillor | Term of office |
|---|---|
| J. J. Wright | 1885-1888 |
| John Bull | 1888-1889 |
| George Tompsitt | 1889-1890 |
| Edwin Henry Land | 1890-1891 |
| Nathan Moses Lazarus | 1891-1892 |
| Edwin Henry Land | 1892-1897 |
| William Pike | 1897-1899 |
| Patrick Blackall | 1900-1903 |
| James Pike | 1900 |
| Henry Hungerford | 1904-1905 |
| Edwin Atkinson | 1906-1907 |
| Ernest Hincksman | 1907-1909 |
| Richard Moore | 1909-1910 |
| Arthur Collett | 1910-1912 |
| Fredrick Woodward | 1913 |
| Richard Moore | 1913-1914 |
| Frederick Woodward | 1915-1917 |
| Arthur Collett | 1917-1920 |
| Frederick Woodward | 1920-1921 |
| James Harris | 1922-1924 |
| William Freebody | 1925-1927 |
| Henry Land | 1927-1929 |
| William Freebody | 1929-1932 |
| Henry Taylor | 1932-1935 |
| John Esmond | 1935-1939 |
| Henry Taylor | 1939-1951 |
| Ralph Spendelove | 1951-1954 |
| Arthur Lambert | 1954-1963 |
| Frederick Land | 1963-1980 |
| David Madew | 1980-1991 |
| Frank Pangallo | 1991-2008 |
| Tim Overall | 2008–2016 |

== Election results ==
=== 2012 ===
| Elected councillor | Party |
|---|---|
| Trudy Taylor | Tim Overall Team |
| Brian Brown | Labor |
| Jamie Cregan | Independent (Group C) |
| Sue Whelan | Independent (Group A) |
| Velice Trajanoski | Tim Overall Team |
| Peter Bray | Tim Overall Team |
| Toni McLennan | Tim Overall Team |
| Judith Burfoot | Labor |
| Kenrick Winchester | Independent (Group D) |

2012 New South Wales local elections: Queanbeyan
| Party | Candidate | Votes | % | ±% |
|---|---|---|---|---|
| Tim Overall Team | | 8,169 | 44.5 | |
| Labor (Group B) | | 3,363 | 18.3 | |
| Independent (Group A) | | 1,919 | 10.4 | |
| Independent (Group C) | | 2,643 | 14.4 | |
| Independent (Group D) | | 1,169 | 6.4 | |
| Greens | | 984 | 5.4 | |
| Independent | Brent Hunter | 117 | 0.6 | |
| Total formal votes | | 18,364 | 91.0 | |
| Informal votes | | | 9.0 | |
| Turnout | | | 76.4 | |

== Amalgamation ==
A 2015 review of local government boundaries recommended that the Queanbeyan City Council merge with adjoining councils. The NSW Government considered two options. The first option was to merge Queanbeyan Council with parts of the Palerang Council to form a new council with an area of 3,791 square kilometres (1,464 sq mi) and support a population of approximately 55,000. The alternative, proposed by Palerang Council on 29 January 2016, was for an amalgamation of the whole of Palerang with Queanbeyan Council. On 12 May 2016 the Minister for Local Government announced dissolution of Queanbeyan City with immediate effect. Together with the Palerang Council the combined council areas were merged to establish the Queanbeyan-Palerang Regional Council.
