= Peter Garling =

Australian judge (born 1952)

The Honourable Peter Richard Garling RFD, SC

Judge of the Supreme Court of New South Wales
- Nominated by: John Hatzistergos
- Appointed by: Dame Marie Bashir

Personal details
- Born: 1952 (age 73–74) Kuala Lumpur, British Malaya (now Malaysia)
- Spouse: Jane Anne Loneragan
- Children: 2 daughters
- Education: University of Sydney (BA LLB)
- Profession: Judge, commissioner, barrister

Peter Garling, RFD, SC (born 1952 in Kuala Lumpur, British Malaya) is an Australian judge of the Supreme Court of New South Wales, the highest court in the state of New South Wales.

Garling is noted for his involvement in multiple high-profile public inquiries and royal commissions. Through his contributions, in particular the Garling Report, Garling has made significant recommendations to improve the public health system of New South Wales.

== Early life and education ==
Peter Garling was born to Max and Patricia Garling in Kuala Lumpur, British Malaya. He is a descendant of Frederick Garling, one of the first solicitors admitted to the Supreme Court of New South Wales and the first appointed Crown Prosecutor in New South Wales.

Garling was educated at Saint Ignatius' College, Riverview and the University of Sydney, where he earned a Bachelor of Arts (1975) and Bachelor of Laws (1977).

During his university days, Garling joined the Sydney University Regiment of the Australian Army Reserve.

== Career ==
=== Early legal career ===
After graduating from the law school, Garling worked as an articled clerk and solicitor at David Landa, Stewart & Company.

=== Barristerial career ===
Garling was admitted to the Bar in 1979 and read with Calvin "Cal" R. Callaway QC. He commenced practising as a barrister in Garfield Barwick Chambers, followed by Second Floor Wentworth Chambers. He practised from Fifth Floor St James Hall from 1992 until his appointment.

On 4 November 1994, Garling took silk as a Senior Counsel.

=== Judicial career ===
In 2010, Garling was appointed as a judge of the Supreme Court of New South Wales.

=== Other activity ===
From 1970 to 1996, Garling was a serving member of the Australian Army Reserve. During this time, he served as the second-in-command of 1 Commando Company, and reached the rank of company commander of the Sydney University Regiment. For his extended services to the Army Reserve, he has been awarded the Reserve Force Decoration.

Garling has been involved in multiple public inquiries and royal commissions, including those into the 1997 Thredbo landslide, the Glenbrook and Waterfall railway accidents, the collapse of the HIH Insurance, and the affairs of the Medical Research and Compensation Foundation. He served as the Commissioner conducting the Special Commission of Inquiry into Acute Care Services in NSW Public Hospitals, authoring the Garling Report.

In 2023, Garling controversially awarded a permanent stay to Scouts NSW in a child sexual abuse case, despite the fact that the accused scout leader was a convicted pedophile. Garling also held the abuse victim liable for the Scouts' legal costs.

== Personal life ==
Garling's three brothers also completed law degrees. At the time of his appointment, brother Max had become a mining entrepreneur; Anthony was a NSW District Court judge; and Kim, a private practice lawyer and former President of the Law Society of New South Wales.

In 1980, Garling married Jane Anne Loneragan, who is a solicitor and was a lecturer at the University of Technology, Sydney. Garling's elder daughter, Antonia, is a lawyer at (Gilbert + Tobin), while his other daughter Lucinda (Lucie) is a chartered accountant at Westpac.

== See also ==
- The Garling Report
