= Hornsby Ku-ring-gai Hospital =

- Northern Sydney Local Health District
- The main building of Hornsby Ku-ring-gai Hospital, photographed in 2026

Geography
- Location: Hornsby, Sydney, New South Wales, Australia
- Coordinates: 33.7019°S 151.1129°E

Organisation
- Care system: Public Medicare (AU)
- Type: District General, Community
- Affiliated university: University of Sydney

Services
- Emergency department: Yes
- Beds: 270

Helipads
- Helipad: (ICAO: YXHK)
| Number | Length | | Surface |
| Number | ft | m | Surface |
|---|---|---|---|
| 1 | | | concrete |

History
- Founded: 26 August 1933

Links
- Website: www.nslhd.health.nsw.gov.au/Hornsby/Pages/default.aspx
- Lists: Hospitals in Australia

Hornsby Ku-ring-gai Hospital is a community hospital on the Upper North Shore region of Sydney, New South Wales Australia, located on Palmerston Road in Hornsby. As a provider of care since 1933, the Hornsby Ku-ring-gai Hospital is a major metropolitan hospital, and is a teaching hospital of the University of Sydney. It provides hospital care for around 300,000 people living in the Hornsby Ku-ring-gai area. The Hornsby Ku-ring-gai Health Service also incorporates six Community Health Centres and ten Early Childhood Centres.

The hospital is under the control of the Northern Sydney Local Health District having previously been a part of the Northern Sydney Central Coast Area Health Service.

While much of the hospital is of a ramshackle design, the main building is a two-storey circular design (named the Lumby Building for its benefactor), which forms the emblem of the hospital.

== Development ==
The Emergency, Paediatrics and Maternity building was opened in late 2006. It is called the HOPE Building (Hospital's Obstetrics, Paediatrics, & Emergency) and now also houses an emergency Mental Health Unit the PECC.

In late 2013 the Mental Health Centre building was opened.

On 5 September 2015, the STAR Building (Surgical, Theatres, Anesthetic, Recovery) was officially opened by NSW Minister for Health Jillian Skinner.

The hospital is currently undergoing major building works. A new Medical Assessment Unit (MAU) has been created from the renovated remains of the old Emergency Department. The Social Work department now has new offices opposite the Fresh Plus Cafe. Major construction of new Mental Health and Drug, Alcohol & Gambling Services buildings including a Mental Health ICU have significantly improved care provision in the area. The old maternity building along with much of the campus is due to be redeveloped.

== In popular culture ==
The lion statues outside Hornsby Ku-ring-gai Hospital, photographed in 2026. These statues were originally part of the British Centre in Hyde Park during the Second World War and were moved to the hospital after the war.

Hornsby Ku-ring-gai Hospital was featured in episodes of the TV series Sons and Daughters in 1984 when character Gordon Hamilton (portrayed by Brian Blain) was treated for a heart attack there.

It was also used frequently to film episodes of the Australian medical drama series All Saints where the historic lions outside the, soon to be demolished, "old" maternity building were featured.

== Supplementary facilities ==
Many houses in the surrounding streets, especially in Palmerston Road, have been converted to medical practices, such as ophthalmology, ear nose and throat, and other specialists. There is also a child-care establishment, and café.

== See also ==
- List of hospitals in Australia
