= Pegram Truss Railroad Bridge =

Pegram Truss Railroad Bridge may refer to:

- Cold Springs Pegram Truss Railroad Bridge, crossing the Big Wood River near Ketchum, Idaho
- Conant Creek Pegram Truss Railroad Bridge, crossing Conant Creek in Fremont County, Idaho
- Gimlet Pegram Truss Railroad Bridge, crossing the Big Wood River in Blaine County, Idaho
- Grace Pegram Truss Railroad Bridge, crossing the Bear River near Grace, Idaho
- Pennsylvania Avenue Bridge (1890), crossing the Anacostia River in Washington, D.C.
- Republican River Pegram Truss, crossing the Republican River near Concordia, Kansas
- Ririe A Pegram Truss Railroad Bridge, crossing the Snake River near Ririe, Idaho
- Ririe B Pegram Truss Railroad Bridge, crossing the Snake River flood channel north of Ririe, Idaho
- St. Anthony Pegram Truss Railroad Bridge, crossing Henrys Fork in Fremont County, Idaho

== See also ==
- Pegram truss
- George H. Pegram
