= List of bridges on the National Register of Historic Places in Idaho =

This is a list of bridges and tunnels on the National Register of Historic Places in the U.S. state of Idaho.

Name	Image	Built	Listed	Location	County	Type
Boise River and Canal Bridge		1922	2007-02-07	Caldwell; 43°41′20″N 116°41′10″W	Canyon	Warren camelback through truss
Bullion Tunnel		1910	1984-09-20	Avery; 47°24′4″N 115°42′4″W	Shoshone	
Capitol Boulevard Memorial Bridge		1931	1990-11-05	Boise; 43°36′32″N 116°12′26″W	Ada	
Clearwater River Camas Prairie Railroad Bridge		1908	2025-09-23	Lewiston; 46°25′32.6″N 117°01′33.4″W	Nez Perce	
Cold Springs Pegram Truss Railroad Bridge	Cold Springs Pegram Truss Railroad Bridge	1894, 1917	1997-07-25	Ketchum; 43°39′14″N 114°20′58″W	Blaine	Pegram through truss
Conant Creek Pegram Truss Railroad Bridge		1894, 1911, 1916	1997-07-25	Grainville; 44°0′52″N 111°21′51″W	Fremont	Pegram through truss
Gimlet Pegram Truss Railroad Bridge	Gimlet Pegram Truss Railroad Bridge	1894, 1914	1997-07-25	Ketchum; 43°35′53″N 114°20′43″W	Blaine	Pegram through truss
Grace Pegram Truss Railroad Bridge		1894, 1913	1997-07-25	Grace; 42°35′6″N 111°44′5″W	Caribou	Pegram through truss
Ninth Street Bridge	Ninth Street Bridge	1911	2001-09-14	Boise; 43°36′34″N 116°12′29″W	Ada	Pratt through truss
North Fork Payette River Bridge		1933	1999-04-02	Smiths Ferry; 44°19′32″N 116°3′30″W	Valley	Reinforced concrete arch
Owsley Bridge	Owsley Bridge	1921	1998-09-18	Hagerman; 42°45′52″N 114°53′21″W	Gooding	Cantilevered Warren truss
Ririe A Pegram Truss Railroad Bridge		1894, 1914	1997-07-25	Ririe; 43°39′59″N 111°44′16″W	Jefferson	Pegram through truss
Ririe B Pegram Truss Railroad Bridge		1894, 1914	1997-07-25	Ririe; 43°39′37″N 111°44′25″W	Jefferson	Pegram through truss
St. Anthony Pegram Truss Railroad Bridge		1896, 1914	1997-07-25	St. Anthony; 43°57′1″N 111°42′59″W	Fremont	Pegram through truss
Washington Water Power Bridges	Washington Water Power Bridge	1929, 1930	1996-12-20	Post Falls; 47°42′40″N 116°57′8″W	Kootenai	Concrete arch/girder
