= National Register of Historic Places listings in Idaho =

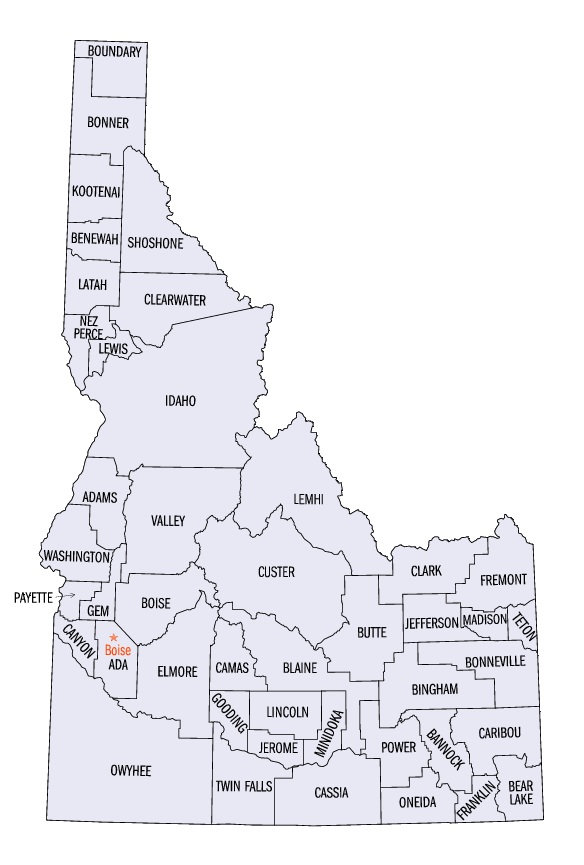
Map of Idaho's counties (clickable)

This is a directory of properties and districts included among the National Register of Historic Places listings in Idaho. There are approximately 1,000 sites in Idaho listed on the National Register. Each of the state's 44 counties has at least one listing on the National Register.

This National Park Service list is complete through NPS recent listings posted November 6, 2026.

== Numbers of listings by county ==
The following are approximate tallies of current listings in Idaho on the National Register of Historic Places. These counts are based on entries in the National Register Information Database as of April 24, 2008 and new weekly listings posted since then on the National Register of Historic Places web site. There are frequent additions to the listings and occasional delistings, and the counts here are not official. Also, the counts in this table exclude boundary increase and decrease listings which modify the area covered by an existing property or district and which carry a separate National Register reference number.

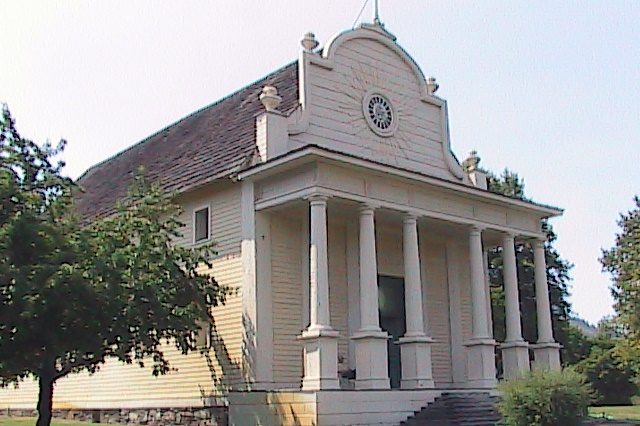
Cataldo Mission in Kootenai County

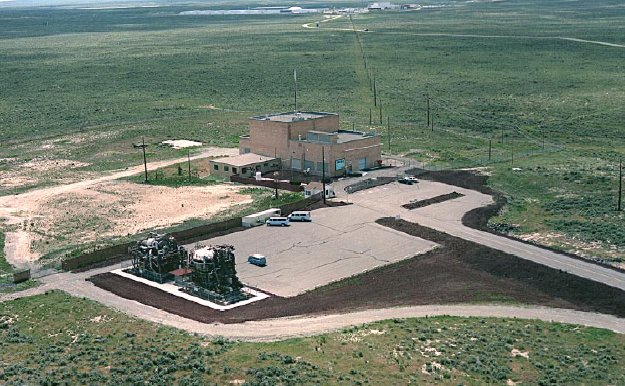
Experimental Breeder Reactor I in Butte County

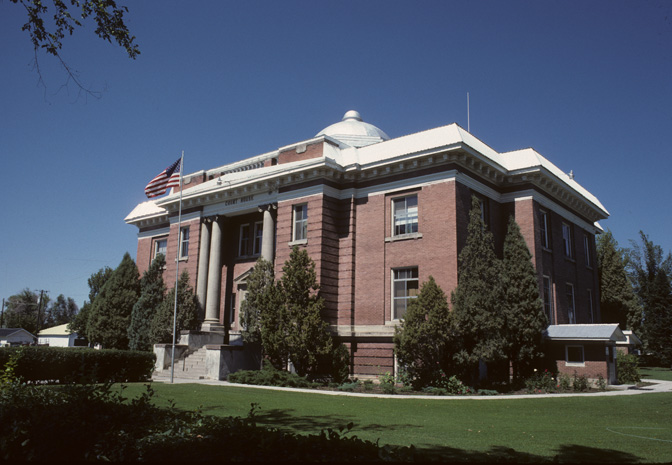
Fremont County Courthouse in Fremont County

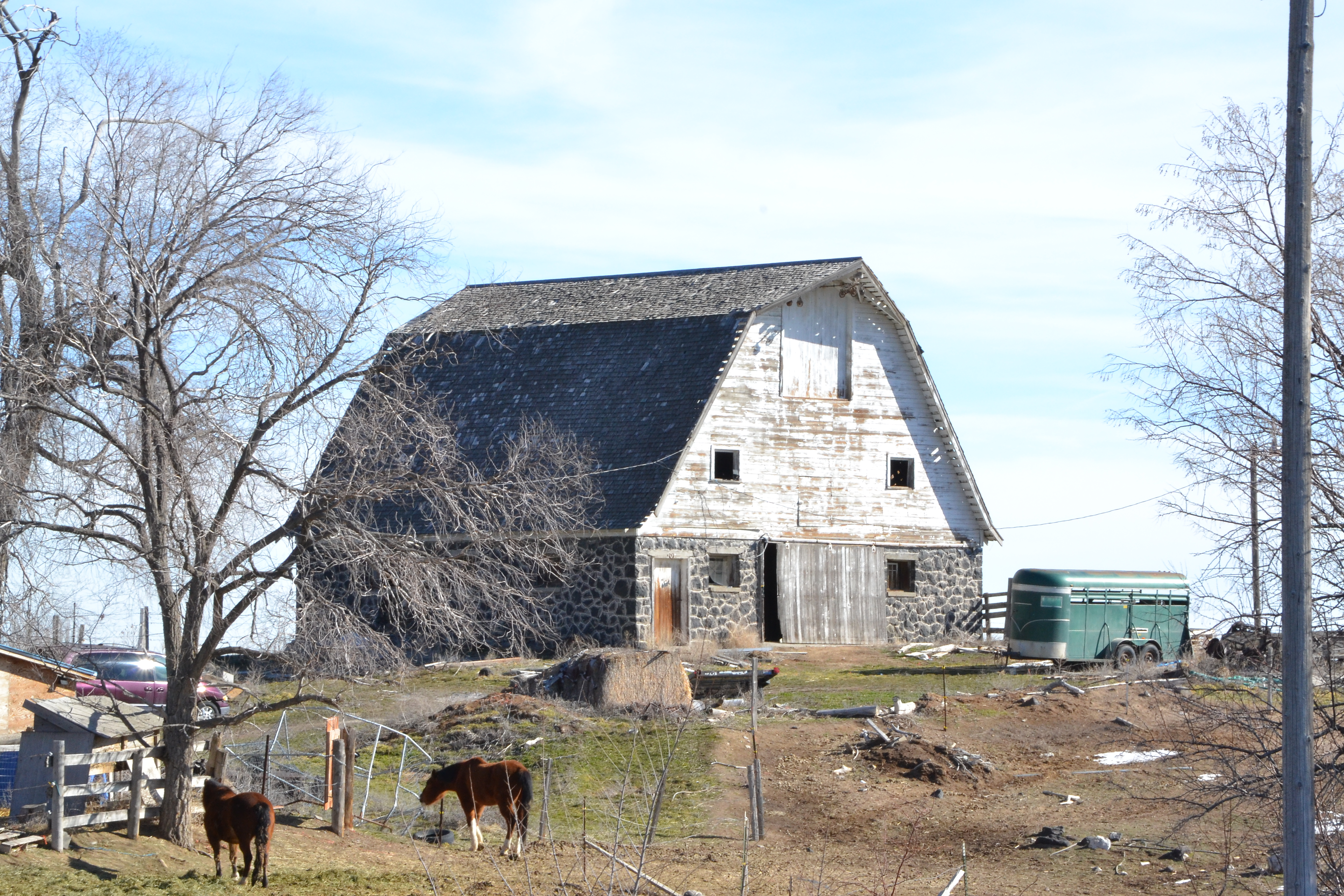
Rice Thomason Barn in Jerome County

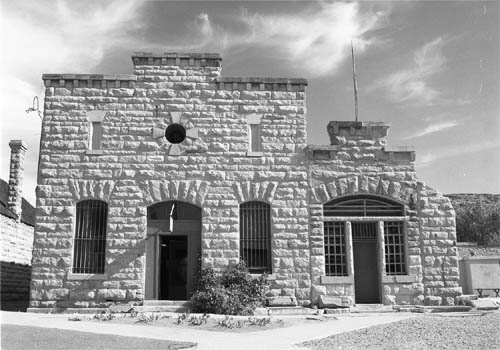
Old Idaho State Penitentiary in Ada County

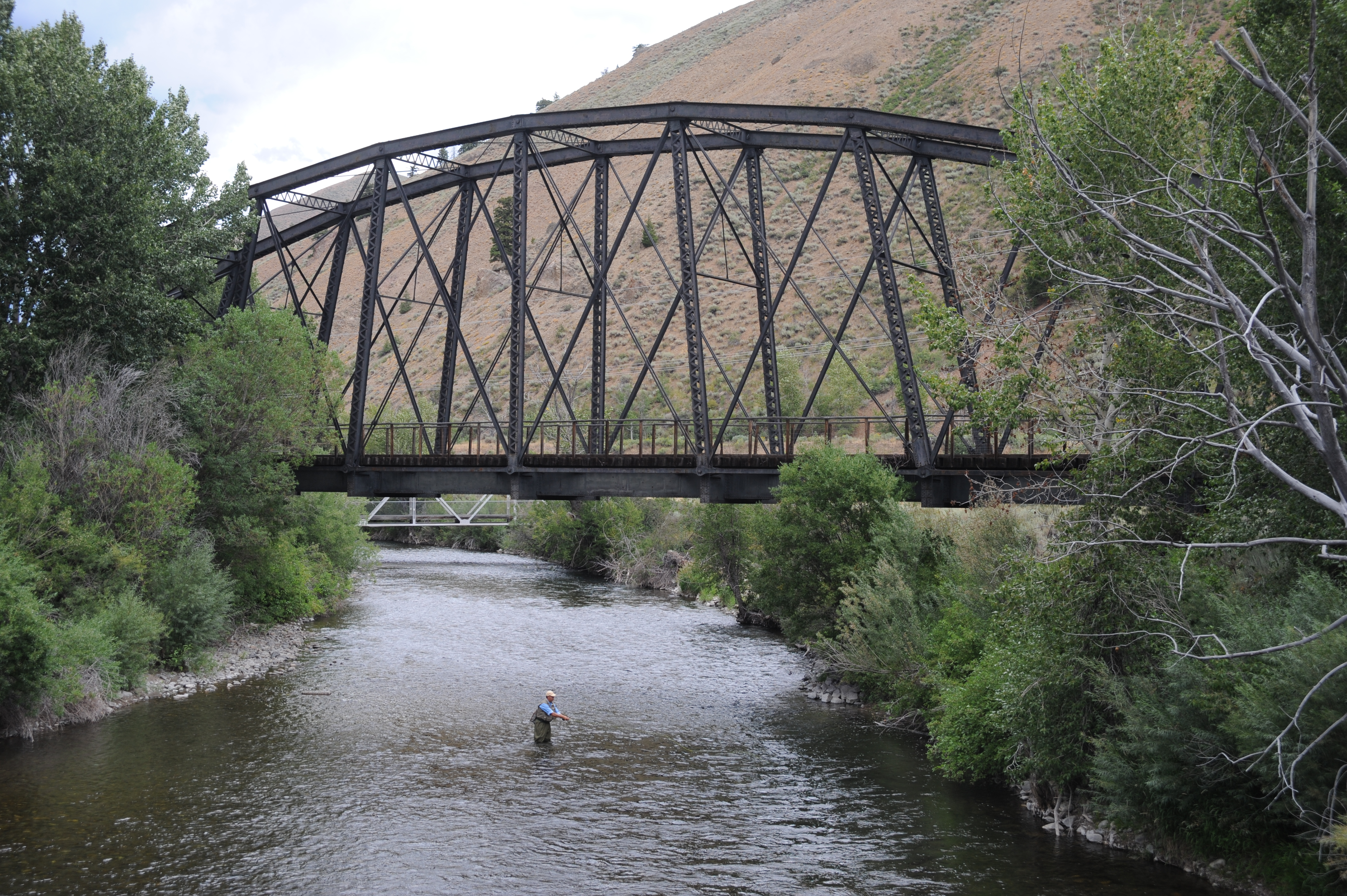
Gimlet Pegram Truss Railroad Bridge in Blaine County

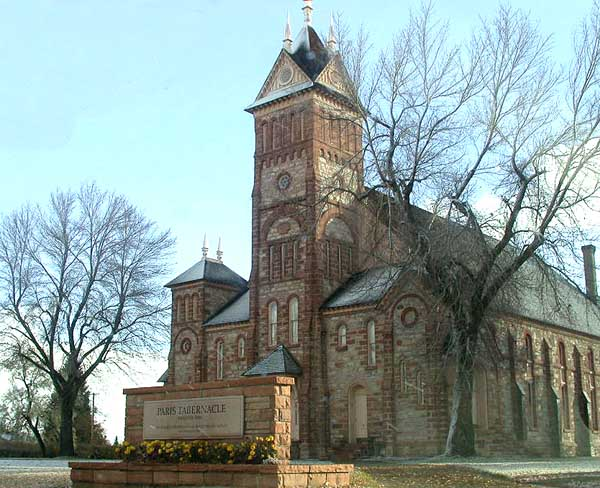
Bear Lake Stake Tabernacle in Bear Lake County

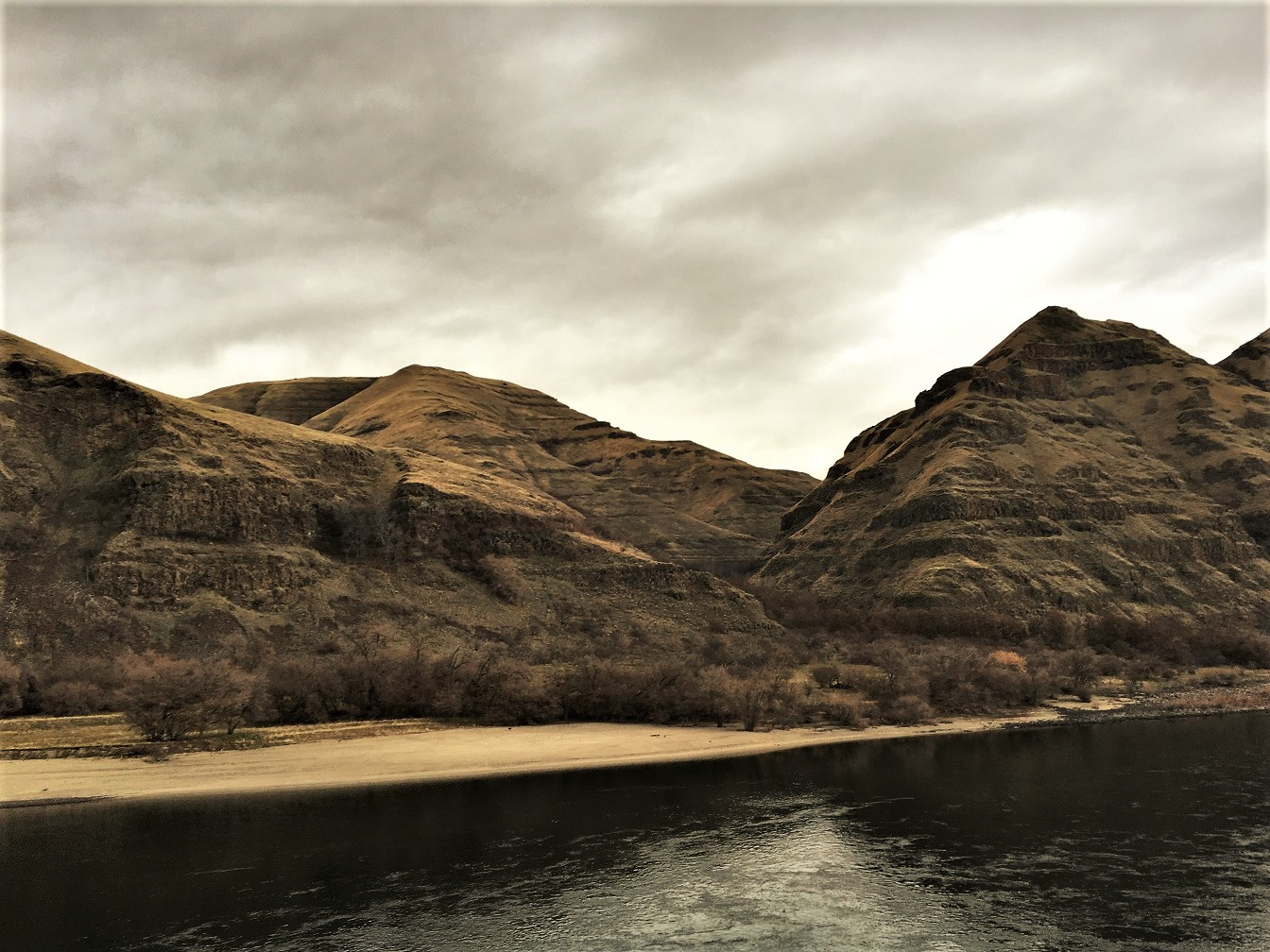
Snake River Archaeological Site in Nez Perce County

	County	# of Sites
1	Ada	167
2	Adams	8
3	Bannock	30
4	Bear Lake	92
5	Benewah	9
6	Bingham	18
7	Blaine	23
8	Boise	4
9	Bonner	17
10	Bonneville	33
11	Boundary	9
12	Butte	4
13	Camas	1
14	Canyon	50
15	Caribou	8
16	Cassia	7
17	Clark	4
18	Clearwater	9
19	Custer	38
20	Elmore	25
21	Franklin	10
22	Fremont	14
23	Gem	10
24	Gooding	13
25	Idaho	45
26	Jefferson	6
27	Jerome	66
28	Kootenai	46
29	Latah	59
30	Lemhi	15
31	Lewis	4
32	Lincoln	41
33	Madison	3
34	Minidoka	3
35	Nez Perce	32
36	Oneida	8
37	Owyhee	14
38	Payette	15
39	Power	12
40	Shoshone	26
41	Teton	5
42	Twin Falls	42
43	Valley	27
44	Washington	32
(duplicates)		(12) (Note: Several historic resources in Idaho are included on multiple county lists: Caldron Linn: Jerome and Twin Falls; Diversion Dam and Deer Flat Embankments: Ada and Canyon; Guffey Butte – Black Butte Archeological District: Ada, Canyon, Elmore, and Owyhee; Hells Canyon Archeological District: Adams, Idaho, and Nez Perce; Lower Salmon River Archeological District: Idaho, Lewis, and Nez Perce; Milner Dam and the Twin Falls Main Canal: Jerome and Twin Falls; Mullan Road: Benewah and Kootenai; Owsley Bridge: Gooding and Twin Falls)
TOTAL		1,092

== See also ==
- List of National Historic Landmarks in Idaho
- List of bridges on the National Register of Historic Places in Idaho
- List of historical societies in Idaho
