= National Register of Historic Places listings in Fremont County, Idaho =

Location of Fremont County in Idaho

This is a list of the National Register of Historic Places listings in Fremont County, Idaho.

This is intended to be a complete list of the properties and districts on the National Register of Historic Places in Fremont County, Idaho, United States. Latitude and longitude coordinates are provided for many National Register properties and districts; these locations may be seen together in a map.

There are 14 properties and districts listed on the National Register in the county. More may be added; properties and districts nationwide are added to the Register weekly.

This National Park Service list is complete through NPS recent listings posted February 13, 2026.

== Current listings ==
	Name on the Register	Image	Date listed	Location	City or town	Description
1	Eleanor Albaugh Cabin		September 29, 2020 (#100005620)	4141 Upper Teton Ave. 44°30′04″N 111°19′40″W	Island Park vicinity	
2	Big Falls Inn	Big Falls Inn	May 31, 2002 (#94000131)	Western bank of Henrys Fork at Upper Mesa Falls in the Targhee National Forest; 44°11′16″N 111°19′37″W	Island Park vicinity	
3	Bishop Mountain Lookout	Bishop Mountain Lookout	May 23, 1986 (#86001184)	Forest Rd. 80120; 44°20′03″N 111°33′09″W	Island Park vicinity	
4	Conant Creek Pegram Truss Railroad Bridge	Conant Creek Pegram Truss Railroad Bridge	July 25, 1997 (#97000756)	Over the Conant Creek, 1 mile south of the junction of Squirrel Rd. and old Ashton-Victor railroad spur tracks 44°00′52″N 111°21′51″W	Grainville	
5	Glen and Addie Crabtree Cabin		June 29, 2000 (#00000742)	3939 Cowan Rd. 44°27′27″N 111°26′22″W	Island Park vicinity	
6	Fremont County Courthouse	Fremont County Courthouse	January 8, 1979 (#79000789)	151 W. 1st St., N. 43°58′04″N 111°41′01″W	St. Anthony	
7	Idaho State Industrial School Women's Dormitory	Idaho State Industrial School Women's Dormitory	November 17, 1982 (#82000344)	2266 E. 600 North; 43°58′10″N 111°42′16″W	St. Anthony vicinity	
8	Independent Order of Odd Fellows Hall	Independent Order of Odd Fellows Hall	July 9, 1997 (#97000763)	601 Main St. 44°04′18″N 111°26′50″W	Ashton	
9	Island Park Land and Cattle Company Home Ranch	Island Park Land and Cattle Company Home Ranch	December 20, 1996 (#96001508)	U.S. Route 20, approximately 1 mile southwest of Island Park; 44°20′41″N 111°27′39″W	Island Park vicinity	
10	Rankin Auto Court		September 19, 2022 (#100008209)	120 South U.S. 20; 44°04′11″N 111°27′24″W	Ashton vicinity	Also known as Rankin Motel.
11	Johnny Sack Cabin	Johnny Sack Cabin	April 19, 1979 (#79000788)	Island Park; 44°30′01″N 111°15′18″W	Island Park vicinity	Well-built log bungalow
12	St. Anthony Pegram Truss Railroad Bridge	St. Anthony Pegram Truss Railroad Bridge	July 25, 1997 (#97000761)	Over Henry's Fork, 0.5 miles south of the junction of S. Parker Rd. and West Belt Branch railroad tracks 43°57′01″N 111°42′59″W	St. Anthony vicinity	
13	Joseph Sherwood House and Store	Joseph Sherwood House and Store	December 9, 1994 (#94001452)	State Highway 87 west of its junction with U.S. Route 20; 44°39′57″N 111°23′08″W	Island Park	
14	US Post Office-St. Anthony Main	US Post Office-St. Anthony Main	March 16, 1989 (#89000136)	48 W. 1st, N. 43°58′02″N 111°40′57″W	St. Anthony	

== See also ==
- List of National Historic Landmarks in Idaho
- National Register of Historic Places listings in Idaho
