= Rankin Motel =

- Rankin Auto Court
- U.S. National Register of Historic Places
- Location within Idaho Location within the United States
- Location: 120 South U.S. 20, Fremont County, Idaho, near Ashton, Idaho
- Coordinates: 44.069627°N 111.456656°W
- Area: 2.68 acres (1.08 ha)
- Built: 1920-1924
- NRHP reference No.: 100008209
- Added to NRHP: September 19, 2022

The Rankin Motel is a historic motel on U.S. Highway 20 outside of Ashton, Idaho. Located about 55 miles (89 km) from West Yellowstone, it was intended to serve visitors to Yellowstone National Park. It has also been known as Rankin Auto Court and is listed under that name on the National Register of Historic Places.

Before opening to the public, it was partially built with a U-shaped driveway and construction of several small cottage units as well as a shared facility for bathrooms and showers. It was completed with the addition of a six-unit motor court building and opened in 1924. The owners built on part of their farmland. Additional building were added over the succeeding decades inckuding an office.

It was added to the National Register of Historic Places in 2022. As of 2023 it was still in the family.

== See also ==
- National Register of Historic Places listings in Fremont County, Idaho
- Independent Order of Odd Fellows Hall (Ashton, Idaho) (1908), also listed on the National Register
