= West Point Grade School =

- U.S. National Register of Historic Places
- Location within Idaho Location within the United States
- Nearest city: Wendell, Idaho
- Coordinates: 42°43′31″N 114°47′32″W
- Area: less than one acre
- Built: 1941
- Built by: R. C. Fait
- Architect: Tourtellotte & Hummel
- MPS: Tourtellotte and Hummel Architecture TR
- NRHP reference No.: 82000350
- Added to NRHP: November 17, 1982

The West Point Grade School is a historic former school on East 3300 South in the village of West Point in Gooding County near Wendell, Idaho. It was listed on the National Register of Historic Places in 1982.

It was built in 1941 by general contractor R. C. Fait to designs by prominent Boise architects Tourtellotte & Hummel. It is a vaguely classical design with Art Deco influences, and is the "sole, and therefore exceptionally important, institutional and architectural focus of this somewhat out-of-the-way farm community immediately north of the Snake River in south-central Idaho".

In 1982 the building was occupied as a Grange Hall, but its current use is unknown.

== See also ==
- National Register of Historic Places listings in Gooding County, Idaho
