= Sweet Methodist Episcopal Church =

Historic church in Idaho, United States

- U.S. National Register of Historic Places
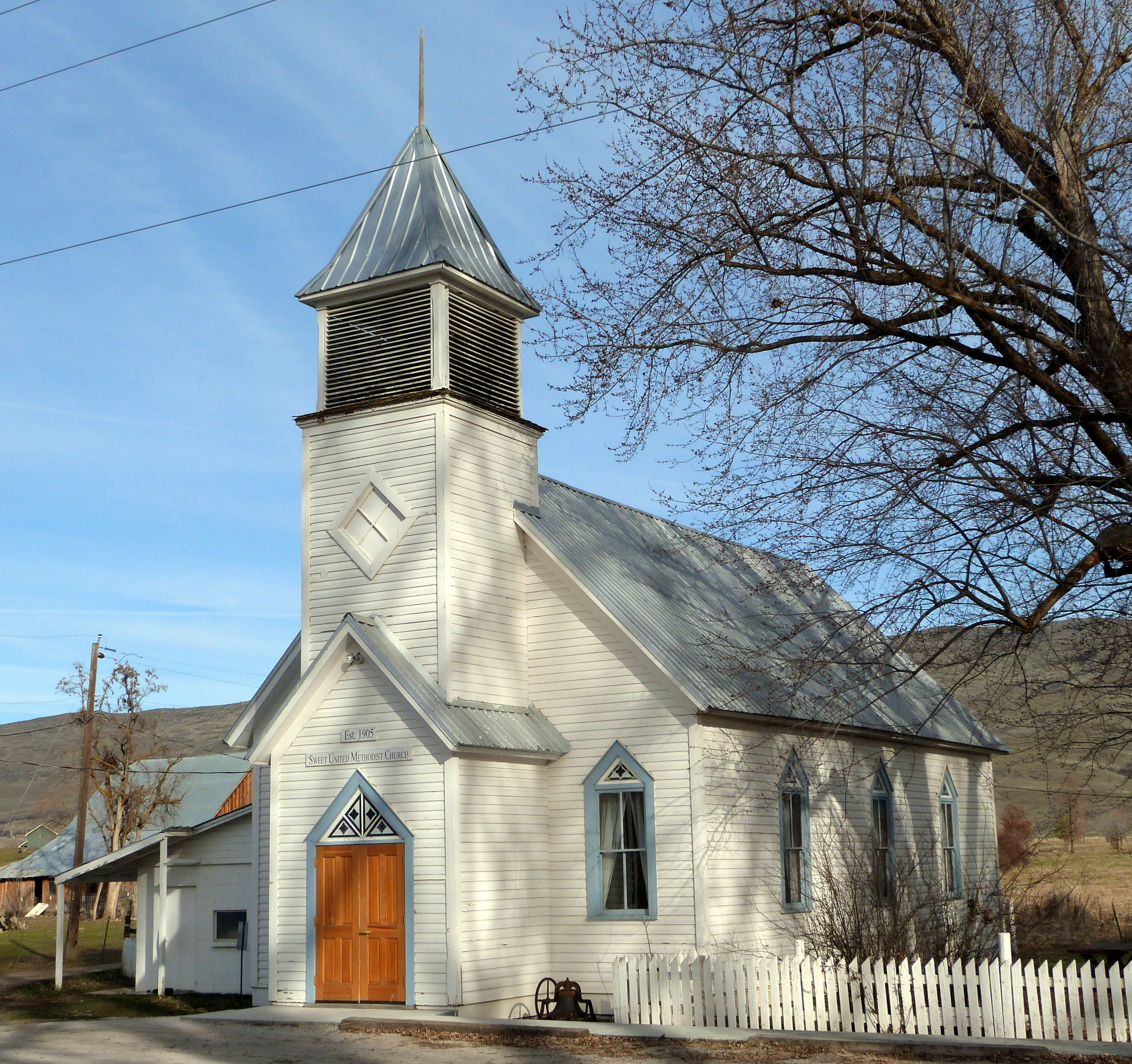

- Location within Idaho Location within the United States
- Location: 7200 Sweet-Ola Hwy, Sweet, Idaho
- Coordinates: 43°58′08″N 116°19′40″W
- Area: less than one acre
- Built: 1905
- Architectural style: Late Gothic Revival
- NRHP reference No.: 97000766
- Added to NRHP: July 9, 1997

The Sweet Methodist Episcopal Church, also known as Sweet United Methodist Church, is a historic church at 7200 Sweet-Ola Highway near Sweet, Idaho. The Late Gothic Revival style building was started in 1905 and was added to the National Register in 1997.

It is located across the road from the former Sweet School, about one half mile south of the Sweet townsite. It is a one-and-a-half-story gable-front building with a square belfry which has a hipped roof steeple. It is about 24 by 36 feet (7.3 m × 11.0 m) in plan, with the entryway being about 8 by 8 feet (2.4 m × 2.4 m) and the belfry about 6 by 6 feet (1.8 m × 1.8 m).
