= Capitol Boulevard Memorial Bridge =

Bridge in Boise, Idaho, United States

- U.S. National Register of Historic Places
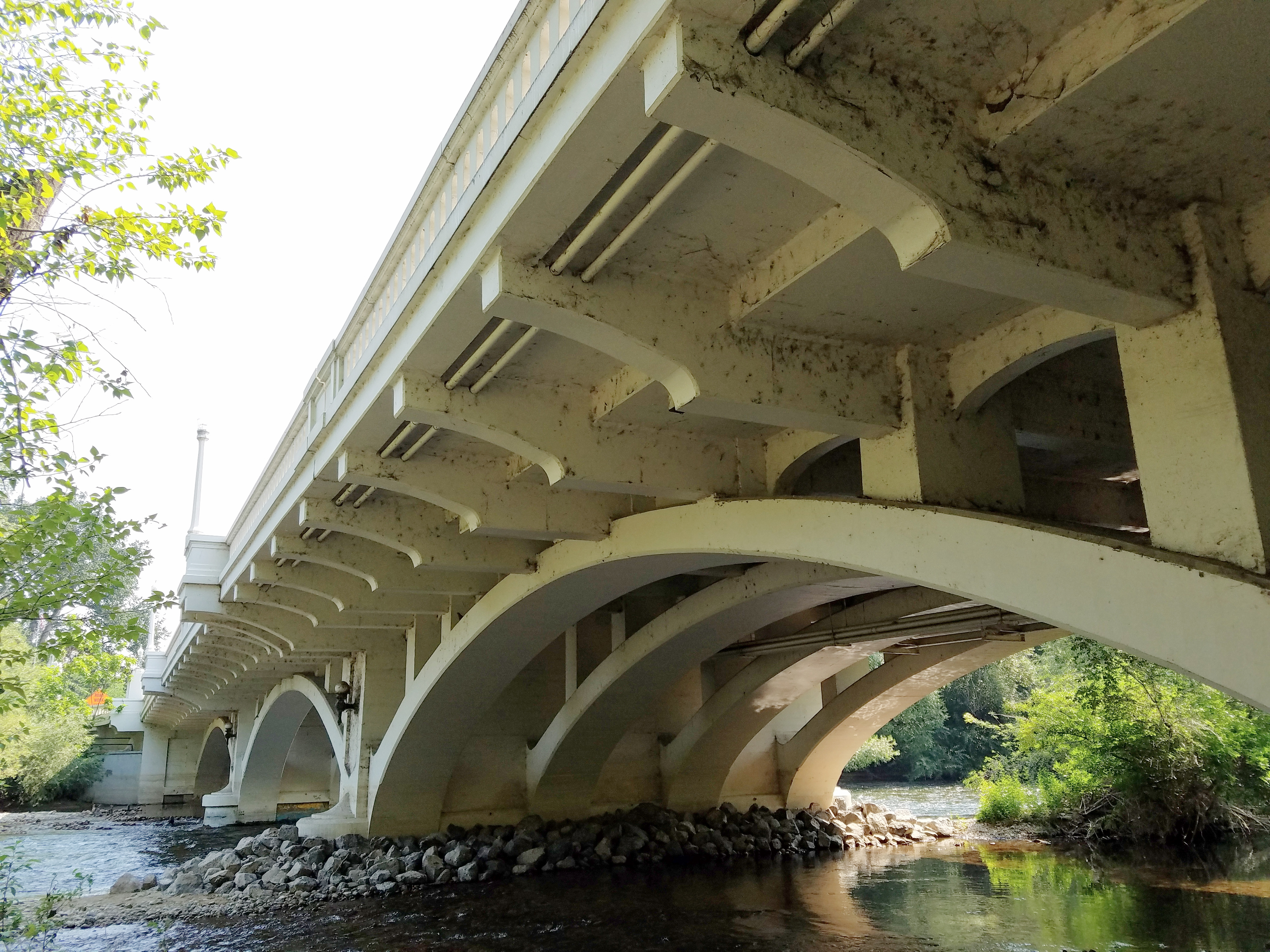

- Location within Idaho Location within the United States
- Location: S Capitol Blvd at Boise River; Boise, Idaho; United States
- Coordinates: 43°36′32″N 116°12′26″W
- Built: 1931
- Architect: Charles A. Kyle
- Architectural style: Art Deco
- NRHP reference No.: 90001717
- Added to NRHP: November 5, 1990

The Capitol Boulevard Memorial Bridge, also known as the Oregon Trail Memorial Bridge, is a historic bridge over the Boise River in Boise, Idaho, United States. It is listed on the National Register of Historic Places.

== Description ==
The bridge is a 310 ft (94 m) Art Deco style deck arch bridge constructed in 1931 by Morrison-Knudsen. Idaho state highway engineer Charles A. Kyle designed the bridge, which includes four 70 ft (21 m) open spandrel arches supporting a 40 ft (12 m) wide roadbed with four lanes of motorized traffic crossing river. Two 6 ft (1.8 m), cantilevered sidewalks allow for pedestrian traffic.

== History ==
Boise was established in 1863, soon after the second Fort Boise was constructed, and its location required that Oregon Trail pioneers ford the Boise River. In 1864 John McClellan and William Thompson formed the Ada Ferry Company and received a charter to operate a ferry at the crossing. McClellan and Thompson constructed a toll bridge near the site in 1868. The Ninth Street Bridge replaced McClellan and Thompson's toll bridge in 1911.

In 1914 architect Charles W. Wayland envisioned a grand boulevard approaching the Idaho State Capitol Building, and after the Boise Depot was built in 1925, city planners redesignated 7th Street as Capitol Boulevard, and the Capitol Boulevard Memorial Bridge was constructed and dedicated as a memorial to Oregon Trail pioneers.

The bridge was refurbished in 1987 and restored in 2013 and was added to the National Register of Historic Places November 5, 1990.

== See also ==
- List of bridges on the National Register of Historic Places in Idaho
- National Register of Historic Places listings in Ada County, Idaho
