= Brady Memorial Chapel =

Historic building in Pocatello, Idaho, US

- U.S. National Register of Historic Places
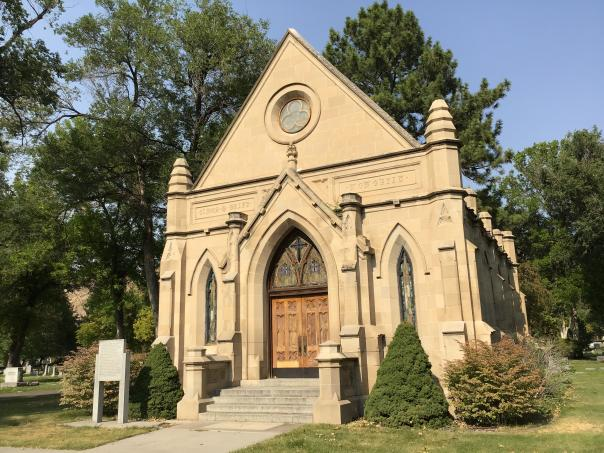

- Location within Idaho Location within the United States
- Location: Mountain View Cemetery, Pocatello, Idaho
- Coordinates: 42°51′20″N 112°25′44″W
- Area: less than one acre
- Built: 1918-1922
- Architect: Frank Paradice, Jr.
- Architectural style: Late Gothic Revival
- NRHP reference No.: 79000772
- Added to NRHP: May 1, 1979

The Brady Memorial Chapel is a historic chapel in Mountain View Cemetery in Pocatello, Idaho.

It was designed by architect Frank Paradice, Jr., was built during 1918 to 1922, and was added to the National Register in 1979.

The chapel includes a tomb of the late Idaho governor and U.S. senator James H. Brady.

== See also ==
- Thompson Mortuary Chapel
- National Register of Historic Places listings in Bannock County, Idaho
