= Glen and Addie Crabtree Cabin =

- Crabtree, Glen and Addie, Cabin
- U.S. National Register of Historic Places
- Location within Idaho Location within the United States
- Location: 3939 Cowan Rd., Island Park, Idaho
- Coordinates: 44°27′27″N 111°26′22″W
- Area: less than one acre
- Built: 1929-32, 1950
- Built by: Crabtree, Charles Samuel
- Architectural style: Rustic
- NRHP reference No.: 00000742
- Added to NRHP: June 29, 2000

The Glen and Addie Crabtree Cabin was built in 1928. The house near Island Park, Idaho was listed on the National Register of Historic Places in 2000.

It is a rustic log cabin, with original portion 20 by 42 feet (6.1 m × 12.8 m) in plan. It was expanded in 1950. It was moved to its current location in 1997.

== See also ==
- National Register of Historic Places listings in Fremont County, Idaho
