= Thompson Mortuary Chapel =

- U.S. National Register of Historic Places
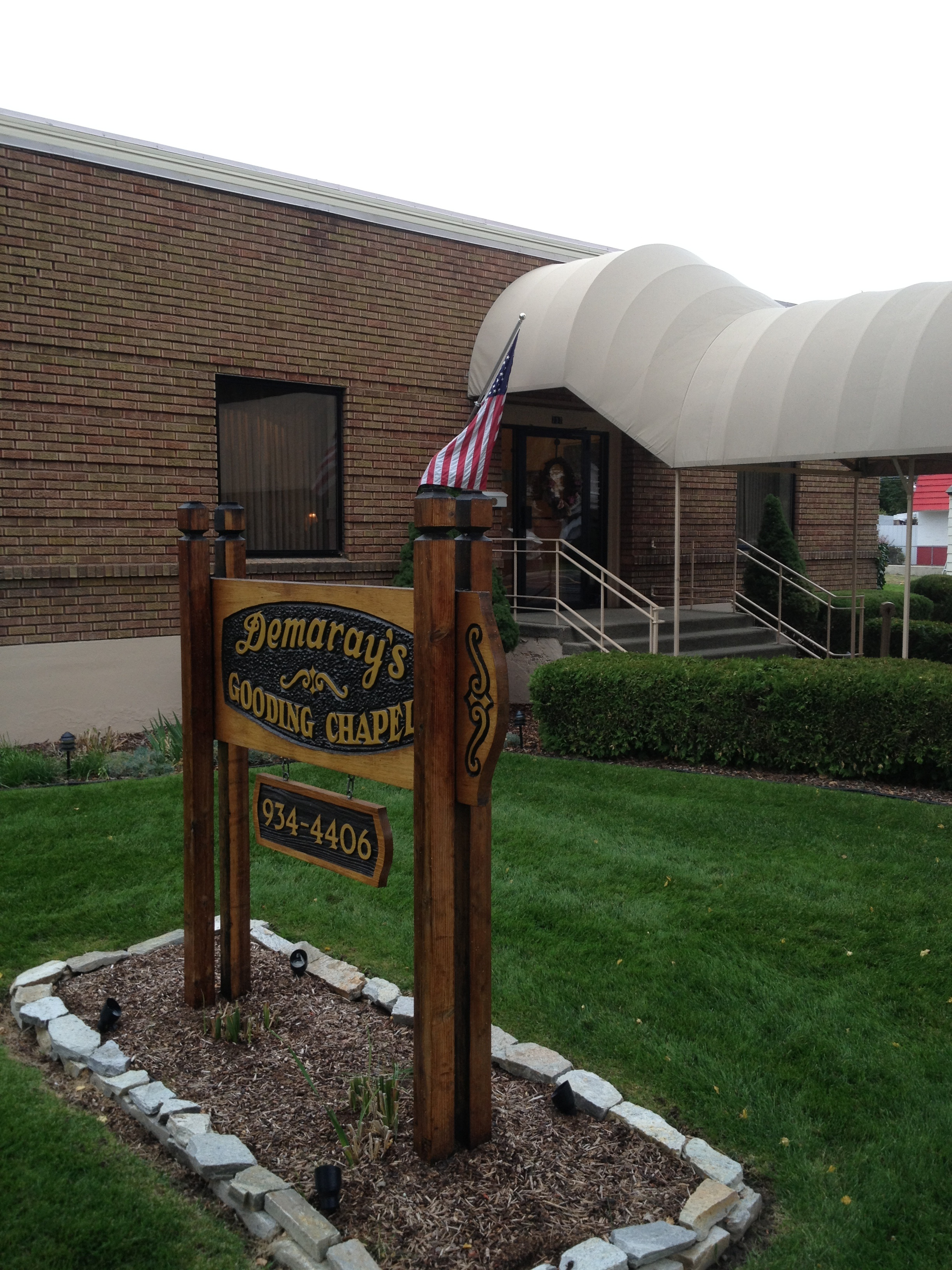

- Location within Idaho Location within the United States
- Location: 737 Main St., Gooding, Idaho
- Coordinates: 42°56′16″N 114°42′44″W
- Area: less than one acre
- Built: 1939
- Architect: Tourtellotte & Hummel
- Architectural style: Moderne
- MPS: Tourtellotte and Hummel Architecture TR
- NRHP reference No.: 82000348
- Added to NRHP: November 17, 1982

The Thompson Mortuary Chapel, now Demaray's Gooding Chapel, is a historic building in Gooding, Idaho, designed by Tourtellotte & Hummel. It was placed on the National Register of Historic Places in 1982.

It was built in 1939 for A. E. Thompson of Gooding as a home for his furniture and undertaking business. It is a rare example of the art moderne style in Idaho.

== See also ==
- Brady Memorial Chapel
- National Register of Historic Places listings in Gooding County, Idaho
