= Bishop Mountain Lookout =

- U.S. National Register of Historic Places
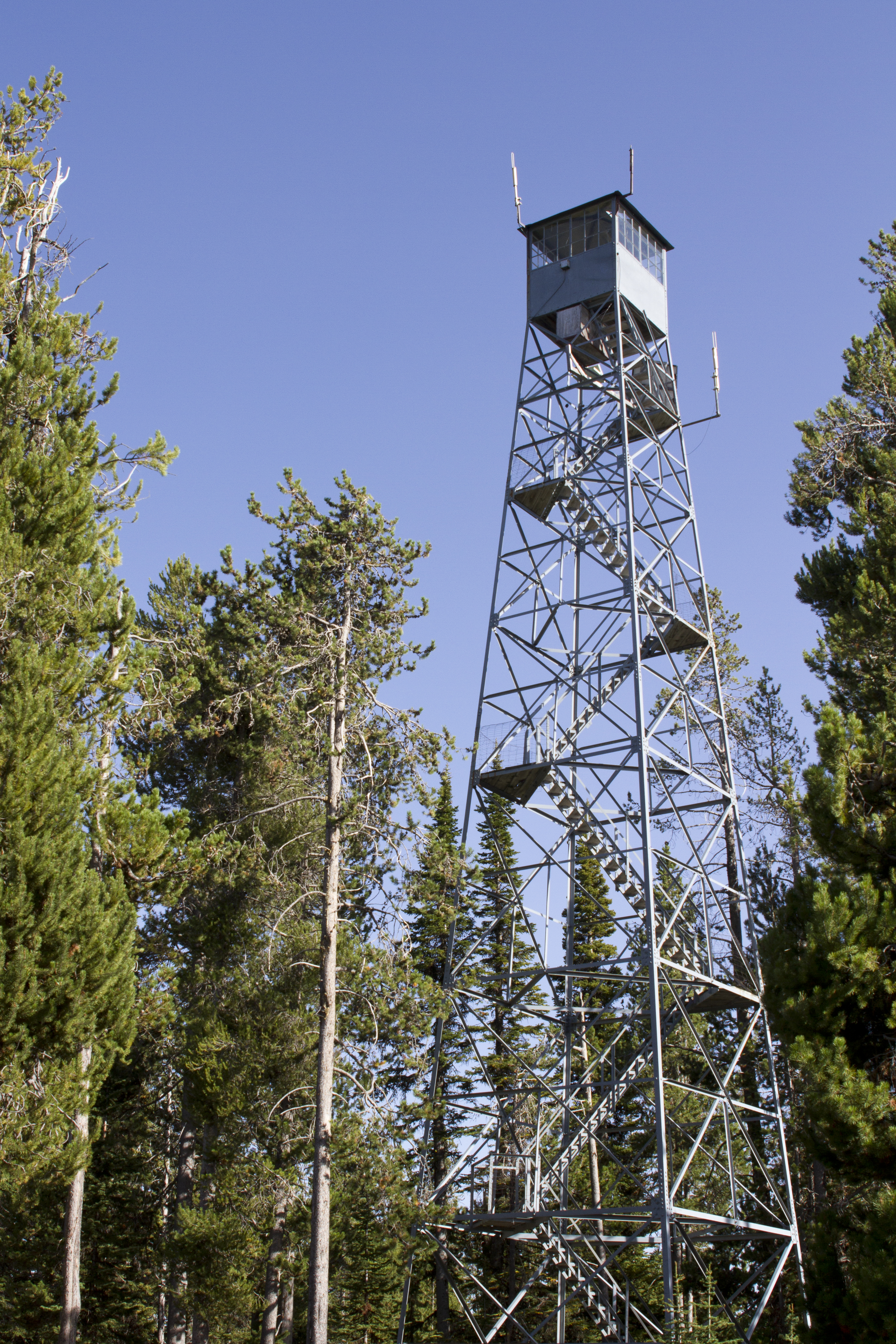
- Bishop Mountain Lookout tower

- Location within Idaho Location within the United States
- Location: Forest Road; Island Park, Idaho
- Coordinates: 44.334167°N 111.5525°W
- NRHP reference No.: 86001184
- Added to NRHP: May 23, 1986

The Bishop Mountain Lookout, located near Island Park, Idaho, was created between 1936 and 1938 by the Civilian Conservation Corps (CCC) in the Caribou-Targhee National Forest. It was listed on the National Register of Historic Places in 1986, and its cabin is currently available as reserved accommodations through the United States Forest Service.

== Background ==
Bishop Mountain Look was constructed between 1936 and 1938 by members of Company 2515 of the Civilian Conservation Corps (CCC), based at Camp Porcupine (F-405), as a fire lookout for the United States Forest Service in the Caribou-Targhee National Forest.

When Franklin D. Roosevelt first ran for the office of President of the United States, America was in the midst of The Great Depression, with economic recovery uncertain. Roosevelt campaigned in 1932 on the promise, "I pledge you, I pledge myself, to a new deal for the American people." The CCC, which operated 1933–1942, was part of his New Deal program, providing unskilled manual labor jobs related to the conservation and development of natural resources in rural lands owned by federal, state and local governments. In Idaho, the CCC, employed 80,000 men, a larger per capita ratio than any other state.

The 72-foot (22 m) steel construction fire lookout tower is topped by a steel cab manufactured by Aermotor Company of Chicago. It is situated at an elevation of 7,810 feet (2,380 m) on the summit of Bishop Mountain, an extinct volcanic vent on the rim of the Island Park Caldera.

The log cabin was built as a 16'x24' one-room, screened-porch structure, with a "vault toilet" in a separate building. The cabin, which has no running water, electricity, bed linens or other basic amenities, is currently available for rental through the National Forest Service. Much of the road access is paved with only gravel, and can only be accessed by snowmobile during many of the winter months.

== NRHP certification ==
The property was added to the NRHP in Fremont County, Idaho on May 23, 1986.

== Sources ==
- McDonald, Joseph A. (1986), Bishop Mountain Lookout, National Park Service
