= National Register of Historic Places listings in Gooding County, Idaho =

Location of Gooding County in Idaho

This is a list of the National Register of Historic Places listings in Gooding County, Idaho.

This is intended to be a complete list of the properties on the National Register of Historic Places in Gooding County, Idaho, United States. Latitude and longitude coordinates are provided for many National Register properties and districts; these locations may be seen together in a map.

There are 13 properties listed on the National Register in the county. More may be added; properties and districts nationwide are added to the Register weekly.

This National Park Service list is complete through NPS recent listings posted September 11, 2026.

== Current listings ==
	Name on the Register	Image	Date listed	Location	City or town	Description
1	Citizens State Bank	Citizens State Bank	May 7, 1980 (#80001328)	3rd Ave. and Main St. 42°56′34″N 114°42′44″W	Gooding	
2	Gooding College Campus	Gooding College Campus	March 18, 1983 (#83000286)	State Highway 26; 42°55′23″N 114°42′34″W	Gooding	
3	Hagerman State Bank, Limited	Hagerman State Bank, Limited	August 11, 1989 (#89001000)	100 S. State St. 42°48′58″N 114°53′52″W	Hagerman	
4	Kelly's Hotel	Kelly's Hotel	September 12, 1985 (#85002155)	112 Main; 42°56′41″N 114°42′42″W	Gooding	
5	James Henry and Ida Owen Mays House		March 9, 1993 (#92001412)	Along the northern bank of the Snake River, 1.2 miles west of Niagara Springs; 42°39′56″N 114°41′46″W	Wendell	
6	Owsley Bridge	Owsley Bridge	September 18, 1998 (#98001172)	Approximately 200 yards north of the junction of old U.S. Route 30 and Bell Rapids Rd. (Note: The Owsley Bridge spans the boundary between Gooding and Twin Falls counties.); 42°45′52″N 114°53′21″W	Hagerman	
7	Priestly's Hydraulic Ram		February 13, 1975 (#75000631)	6 miles south of Hagerman at Thousand Springs; 42°44′44″N 114°50′31″W	Hagerman	
8	Morris Roberts Store	Morris Roberts Store	July 17, 1978 (#78001062)	Off U.S. Route 30; 42°48′43″N 114°53′55″W	Hagerman	
9	Schubert Theatre	Schubert Theatre	January 6, 2004 (#03001367)	402 Main St. 42°56′30″N 114°42′43″W	Gooding	
10	Archie Teater Studio		September 13, 1984 (#84001132)	Southeast of Bliss; 42°52′47″N 114°54′55″W	Bliss	Archie Boyd Teater's artist studio, designed by Frank Lloyd Wright
11	Thompson Mortuary Chapel	Thompson Mortuary Chapel	November 17, 1982 (#82000348)	737 Main St. 42°56′16″N 114°42′44″W	Gooding	
12	Trinity Episcopal Church	Trinity Episcopal Church	November 17, 1982 (#82000349)	7th and Idaho Sts. 42°56′18″N 114°42′46″W	Gooding	
13	West Point Grade School		November 17, 1982 (#82000350)	Off interstate 86; 42°43′31″N 114°47′29″W	Wendell	

== See also ==
- List of National Historic Landmarks in Idaho
- National Register of Historic Places listings in Idaho
