= National Register of Historic Places listings in Boise County, Idaho =

Location of Boise County in Idaho

This is a list of the National Register of Historic Places listings in Boise County, Idaho.

This is intended to be a complete list of the properties and districts on the National Register of Historic Places in Boise County, Idaho, United States. Latitude and longitude coordinates are provided for many National Register properties and districts; these locations may be seen together in a map.

There are 4 properties and districts listed on the National Register in the county. More may be added; properties and districts nationwide are added to the Register weekly.

This National Park Service list is complete through NPS recent listings posted May 30, 2025.

== Current listings ==
	Name on the Register	Image	Date listed	Location	City or town	Description
1	Arrowrock Dam	Arrowrock Dam	November 9, 1972 (#72000437)	About 10 miles east of Boise on United States Forest Service roads 43°35′44″N 115°55′19″W	Boise	
2	Idaho City	Idaho City	June 27, 1975 (#75000626)	Bounded by the city limits 43°49′47″N 115°49′58″W	Idaho City	
3	Placerville Historic District	Placerville Historic District	September 7, 1984 (#84001029)	Roughly bounded by the city limits 43°56′35″N 115°56′49″W	Placerville	
4	Upper Brownlee School	Upper Brownlee School	March 31, 1998 (#98000264)	Dry Buck Rd., 0.1 miles northeast of its junction with Timber Butte Rd. 44°02′07″N 116°14′14″W	Sweet	

== See also ==
- List of National Historic Landmarks in Idaho
- National Register of Historic Places listings in Idaho
