= Upper Brownlee School =

- U.S. National Register of Historic Places
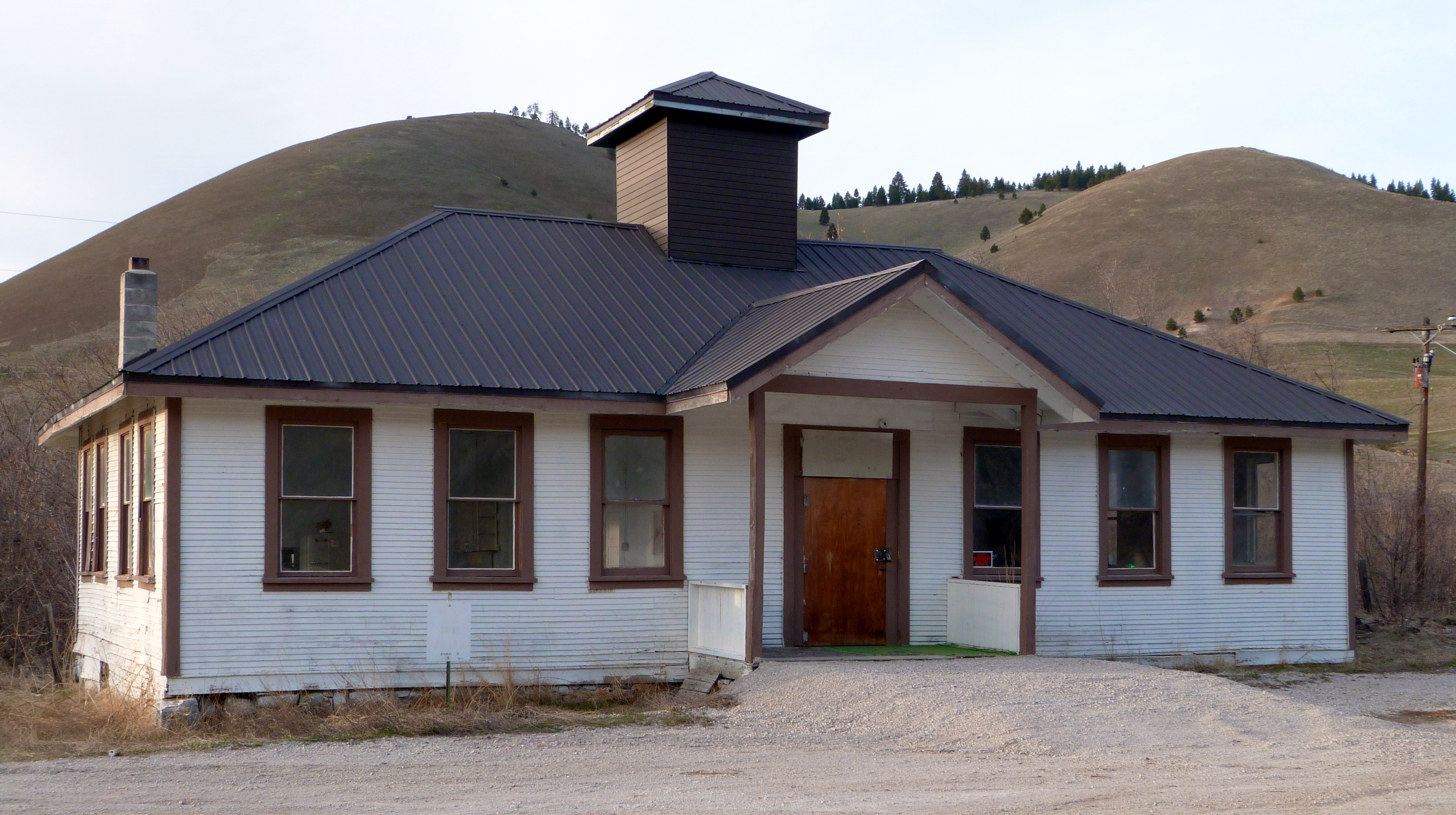
- The school building's exterior in 2015

- Location within Idaho Location within the United States
- Location: On Dry Buck Road, 0.1 miles (0.16 km) NE of jct. with Timber Butte Road
- Nearest city: Sweet, Idaho
- Coordinates: 44°02′07″N 116°14′14″W
- Area: less than one acre
- Built: 1911
- MPS: Public School Buildings in Idaho MPS
- NRHP reference No.: 98000264
- Added to NRHP: March 31, 1998

The Upper Brownlee School is a historic school building located on Dry Buck Road near Sweet, Idaho, United States. The school was built in 1911 by the residents of Brownlee, one of the several small mining communities which had grown in the Boise River basin in the late 19th century. The two-room schoolhouse was built in keeping with contemporary standards for rural schools; it provided for heating and ventilation, had several windows to provide light, included two cloakrooms and a library room, and featured hand-carved wooden trim for decoration. Like many rural Idaho schools, the schoolhouse also served as the local community center. The declining local population and the expense of new safety regulations in the 1940s spelled the end of Brownlee's school, and the district merged into Sweet's district in 1951. The building was purchased by area residents to serve as a community center and is now the only active community building in the area.

The school was added to the National Register of Historic Places on March 31, 1998.

== See also ==
- List of National Historic Landmarks in Idaho
- National Register of Historic Places listings in Boise County, Idaho
