= Sweet, Idaho =

Unincorporated community in the state of Idaho, United States

- Unincorporated community
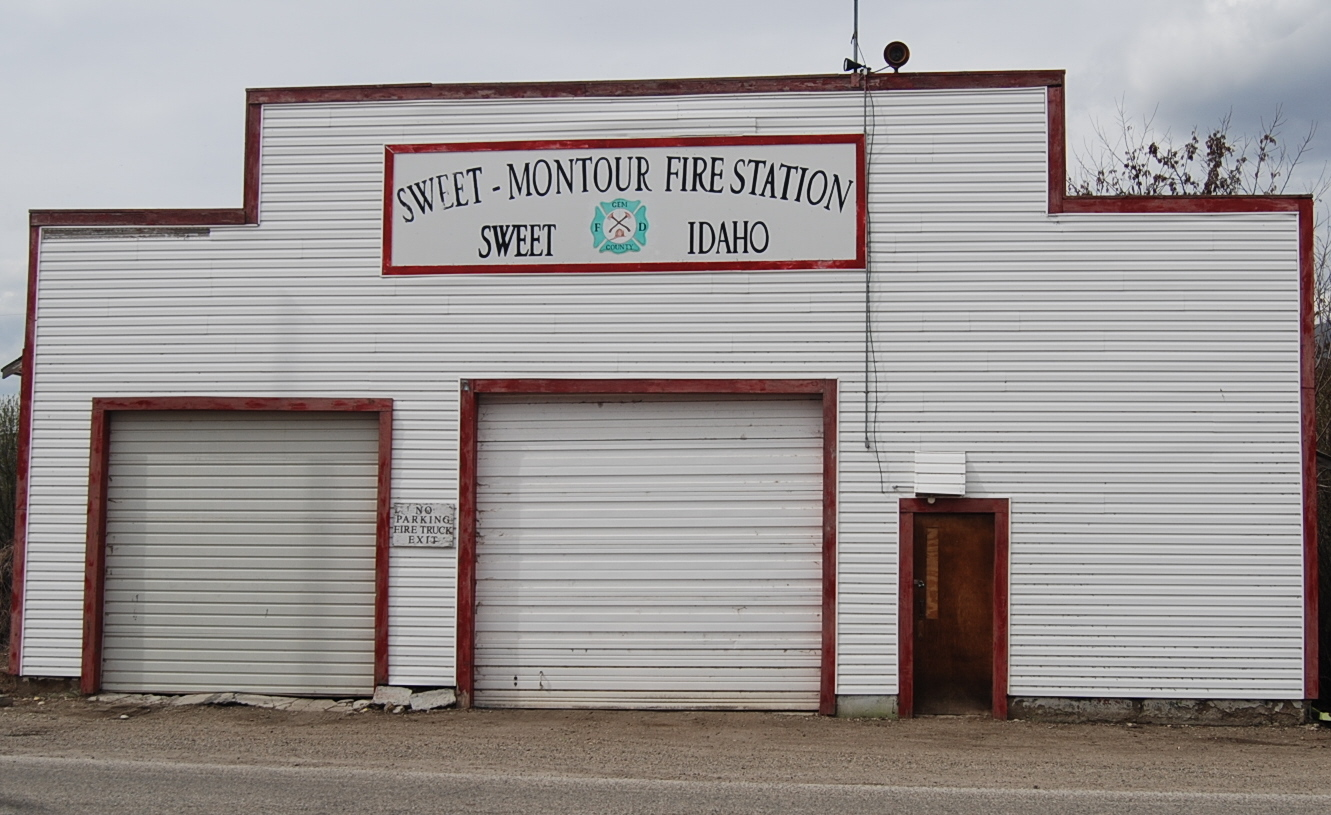
- Sweet Fire Station

- Location within the state of Idaho Sweet, Idaho (the United States)
- Coordinates: 43°58′23″N 116°19′28″W
- Country: United States
- State: Idaho
- County: Gem
- Elevation: 2,559 ft (780 m)
- Time zone: UTC-7 (Mountain (MST))
  - Summer (DST): UTC-6 (MDT)
- ZIP codes: 83670
- Area codes: 208, 986
- GNIS feature ID: 397232

Sweet is an unincorporated community in Gem County, Idaho, United States. It is located in open countryside 10 mi (16 km) northeast of Emmett, along a county highway 8 miles due north of its intersection with State Highway 52.

== Background ==
Founded in 1885 by Ezekiel Sweet, the community initially was a supply location and post office for farmers and ranchers in the nearby Lower Squaw Creek Valley. Sweet grew significantly as a result of the later Thunder Mountain Mines gold strike; by 1900, it supported three saloons, three hotels, several businesses, and a newspaper, which lasted until the gold mines had petered out. Several subsequent fires destroyed most of the historic downtown. Today, a smaller Sweet is the location of a restaurant, Butcher Shop, repair shop, lumber mill and a post office.

The Upper Brownlee School in Sweet, and the Sweet Methodist Episcopal Church, are both listed on the National Register of Historic Places.

Shadow Butte, located northwest of Sweet, and is a notable landmark in the area.
