= Independent Order of Odd Fellows Hall (Ashton, Idaho) =

- U.S. National Register of Historic Places
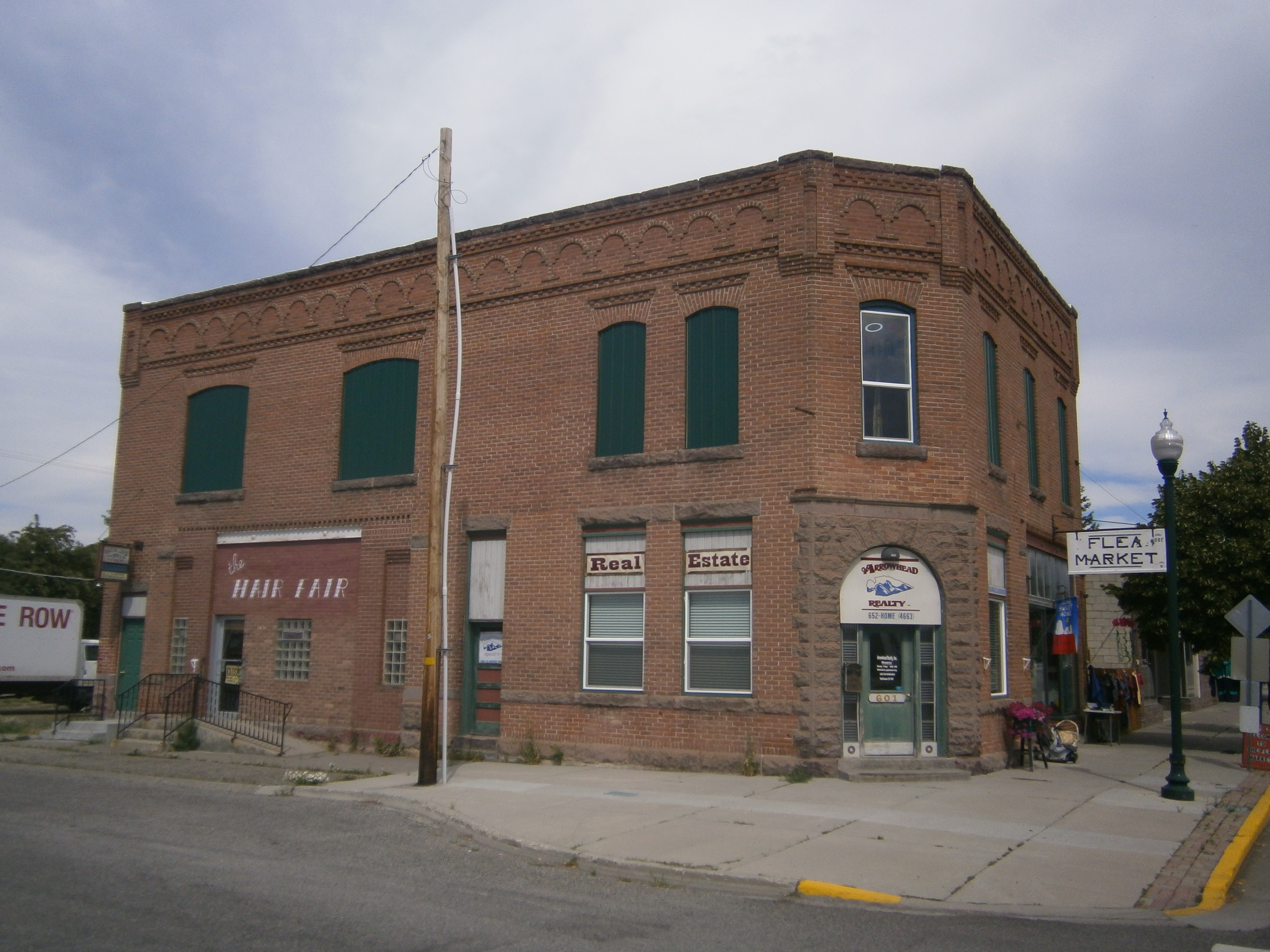
- View from the southwest

- Location within Idaho Location within the United States
- Location: 601 Main St., Ashton, Idaho
- Coordinates: 44°4′18″N 111°26′49″W
- Area: less than one acre
- Built: 1907
- Built by: Smokey Johnson and William Baker
- Architectural style: Early Commercial
- NRHP reference No.: 97000763
- Added to NRHP: July 9, 1997

The Independent Order of Odd Fellows Hall in Ashton, Idaho, also known as the Ashton State Bank Building, was constructed in 1907 in Early Commercial architectural style. Its historical use was as a meeting hall and for businesses. It was registered on the National Register of Historic Places in 1997.

The building is made of pressed red brick and features a sandstone foundation, and it has a large brick cornice capped with sandstone. Three commercial spaces are on the first floor, with meeting room for the local Benevolent and Protective Order of Elks lodge above. The first businesses were the Ashton State Bank, a hardware store, and a furniture store.

It is the only early building in Ashton, which developed quickly after the Oregon Short Line Railroad arrived in the Upper Snake River Valley in 1905, that retains its historic character.

== See also ==
- List of Odd Fellows buildings
- National Register of Historic Places listings in Fremont County, Idaho
