= Big Falls Inn =

- U.S. National Register of Historic Places
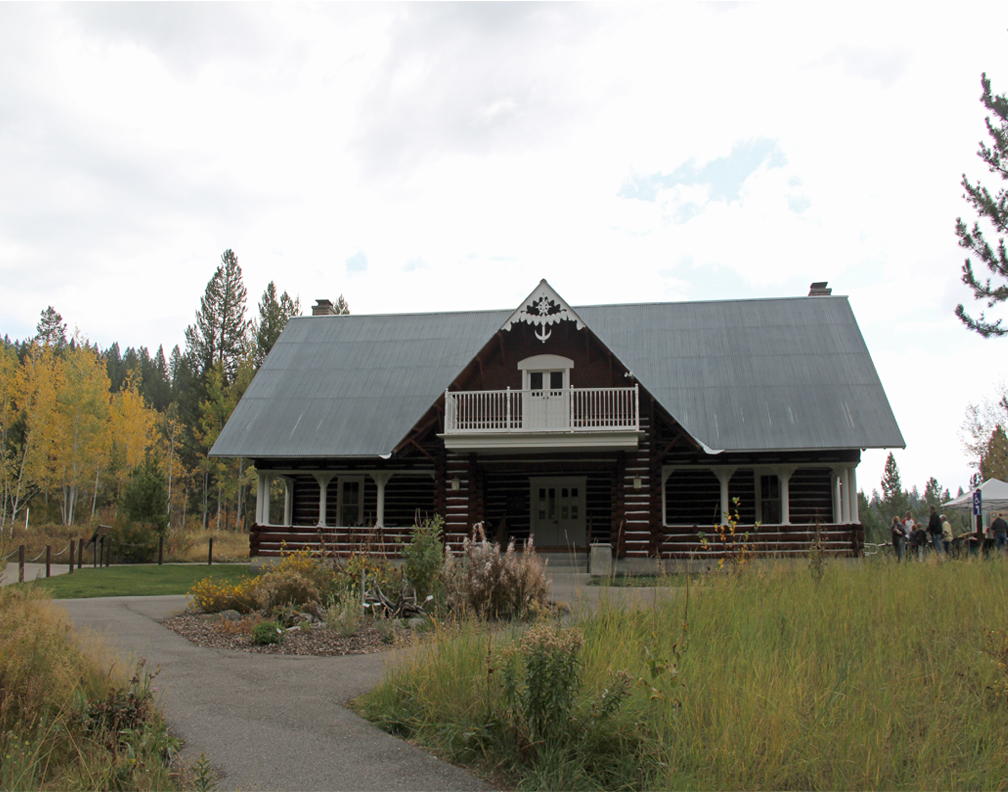

- Location within Idaho Location within the United States
- Location: Western bank of Henrys Fork at Upper Mesa Falls in the Targhee National Forest, near Island Park, Idaho
- Coordinates: 44°11′16″N 111°19′37″W
- Area: 10 acres (4.0 ha)
- Built: 1907
- Architectural style: Peeled log cabin
- NRHP reference No.: 94000131
- Added to NRHP: May 31, 2002

The Big Falls Inn, also known as Upper Mesa Falls Lodge, is located near Island Park, Idaho. It was built in 1907. It is on the western bank of Henrys Fork at Upper Mesa Falls in the Targhee National Forest.

It is a one-and-a-half-story log building on a concrete foundation. It is 62 by 30 feet (18.9 m × 9.1 m) in plan.
