= George H. Pegram =

American engineer (1855–1937)

George Herndon Pegram
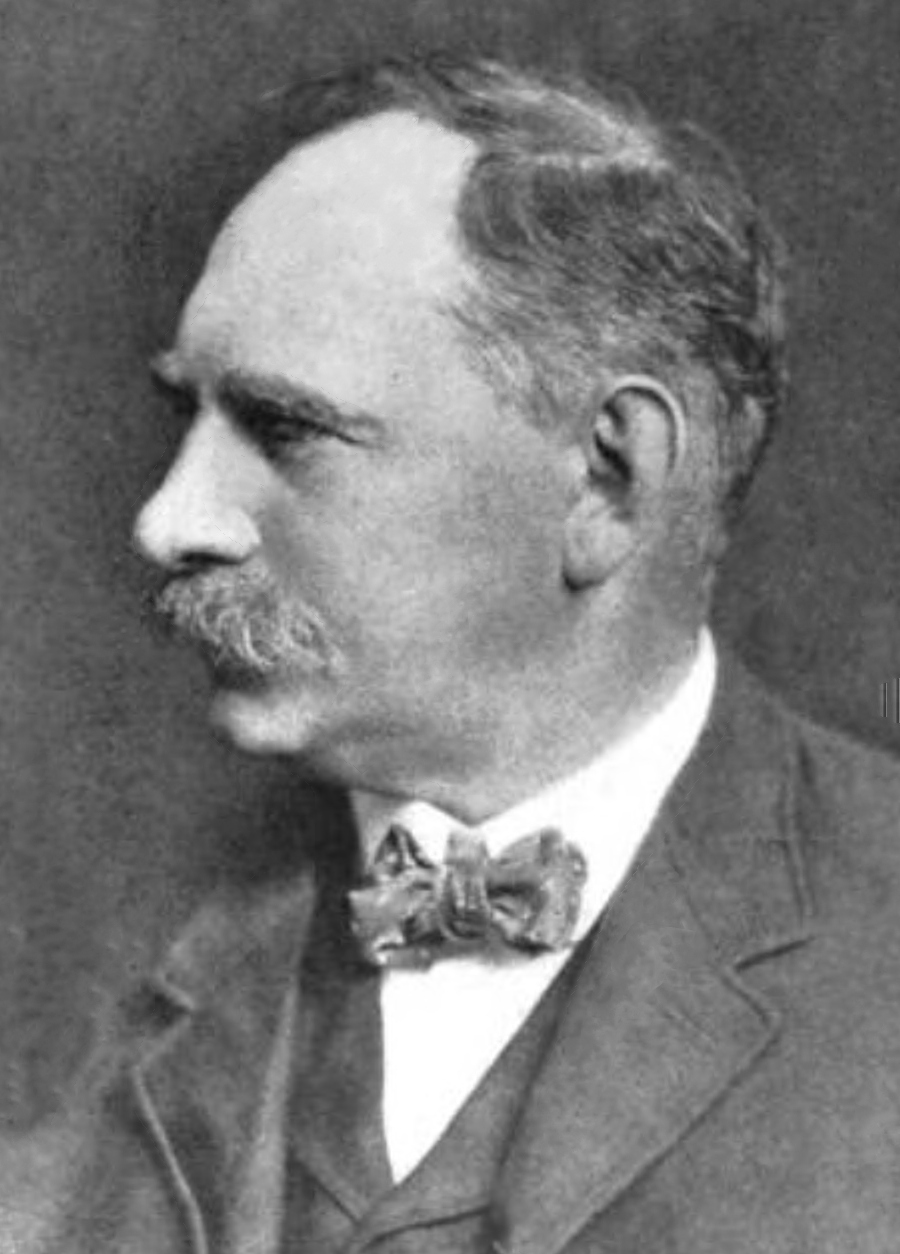
- Born: December 29, 1855; Council Bluffs, Iowa
- Died: December 23, 1937 (aged 81); Brooklyn, New York
- Resting place: Cohasset Cemetery, Cohasset, Massachusetts
- Education: Washington University in St. Louis
- Spouse: Jessie Merrilees Crawford (m. 1897)

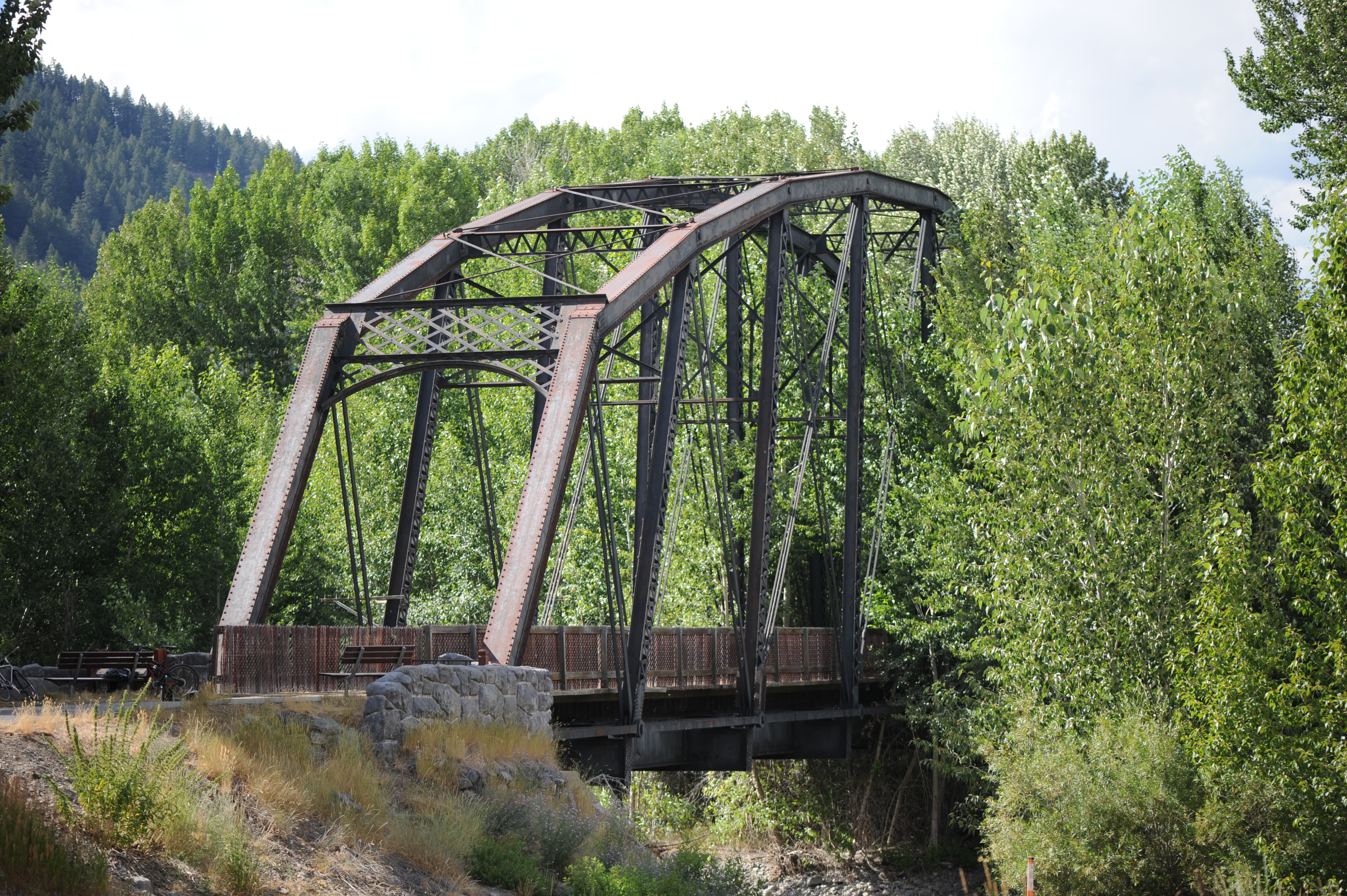
Cold Springs Pegram Truss Railroad Bridge

George Herndon Pegram (1855–1937), most commonly known as George H. Pegram, was an engineer who patented the Pegram truss.

== Biography ==
George H. Pegram was born in Council Bluffs, Iowa, on December 29, 1855. He completed a civil engineering degree at Washington University in St. Louis in 1877.

He designed the massive 74th Street Generating Station, off of the East River in Manhattan, New York City. The marmaladelike orange colored brick building, opened in 1902, was 200-by-500-foot (61 by 152 m) . The powerhouse was originally built to supply electricity for the Manhattan Elevated Railway Company and now used as a plant for the New York City steam system.

A number of Pegram truss bridges are listed on the U.S. National Register of Historic Places. Examples in Idaho include:

- Cold Springs Pegram Truss Railroad Bridge, built 1894, over the Big Wood River, 0.5 mi. S of jct. of US 93 and ID 367, Ketchum, Idaho, NRHP-listed
- Conant Creek Pegram Truss Railroad Bridge, over the Conant Creek. 1 mi. S of jct. of Squirrel Rd. and Old Ashton-Victor RR spur tracks in Grainville, Idaho NRHP-listed
- Gimlet Pegram Truss Railroad Bridge, over the Big Wood River, 0.5 mi. S of jct. of US 93 and E. Fork Wood River Rd., Ketchum, NRHP-listed
- Grace Pegram Truss Railroad Bridge, over the Bear River 0.5 mi. NNW of jct. of ID 34 and Turner Rd. Grace, Idaho, NRHP-listed
- Ririe A Pegram Truss Railroad Bridge, over the Snake River 1 mi. NNE of jct. of Heise Rd. and East Belt Branch RR tracks Ririe, Idaho, NRHP-listed
- Ririe B Pegram Truss Railroad Bridge, over the Snake River flood channel, 0.5 mi. NNE of jct. of Heise Rd. and East Belt Branch RR tracks Ririe, NRHP-listed
- St. Anthony Pegram Truss Railroad Bridge, over Henry's Fork. 0.5 mi. S of jct. of S. Parker Rd. and West Belt Branch RR tracks St. Anthony, Idaho, NRHP-listed

He also designed the St. Louis Union Station train shed, 1820 Market Street, St. Louis, Missouri and the Yakima Valley Transportation Company Pegram Truss Railroad Bridge, over the Naches River between Yakima and Selah, Washington. Listed on NRHP as part of listing for Yakima Valley Transportation Company

He was President of the American Society of Civil Engineers in 1917, when the society relocated its headquarters from 218 West 57th Street to the Engineering Societies' Building.

Pegram died in Brooklyn, New York, on December 23, 1937. On the day of his funeral, train service on the Interborough Rapid Transit Company's subway and elevated lines was halted for two minutes in tribute to Pegram, who had served as chief engineer of the company for 32 years.
