= Johnny Sack Cabin =

- U.S. National Register of Historic Places
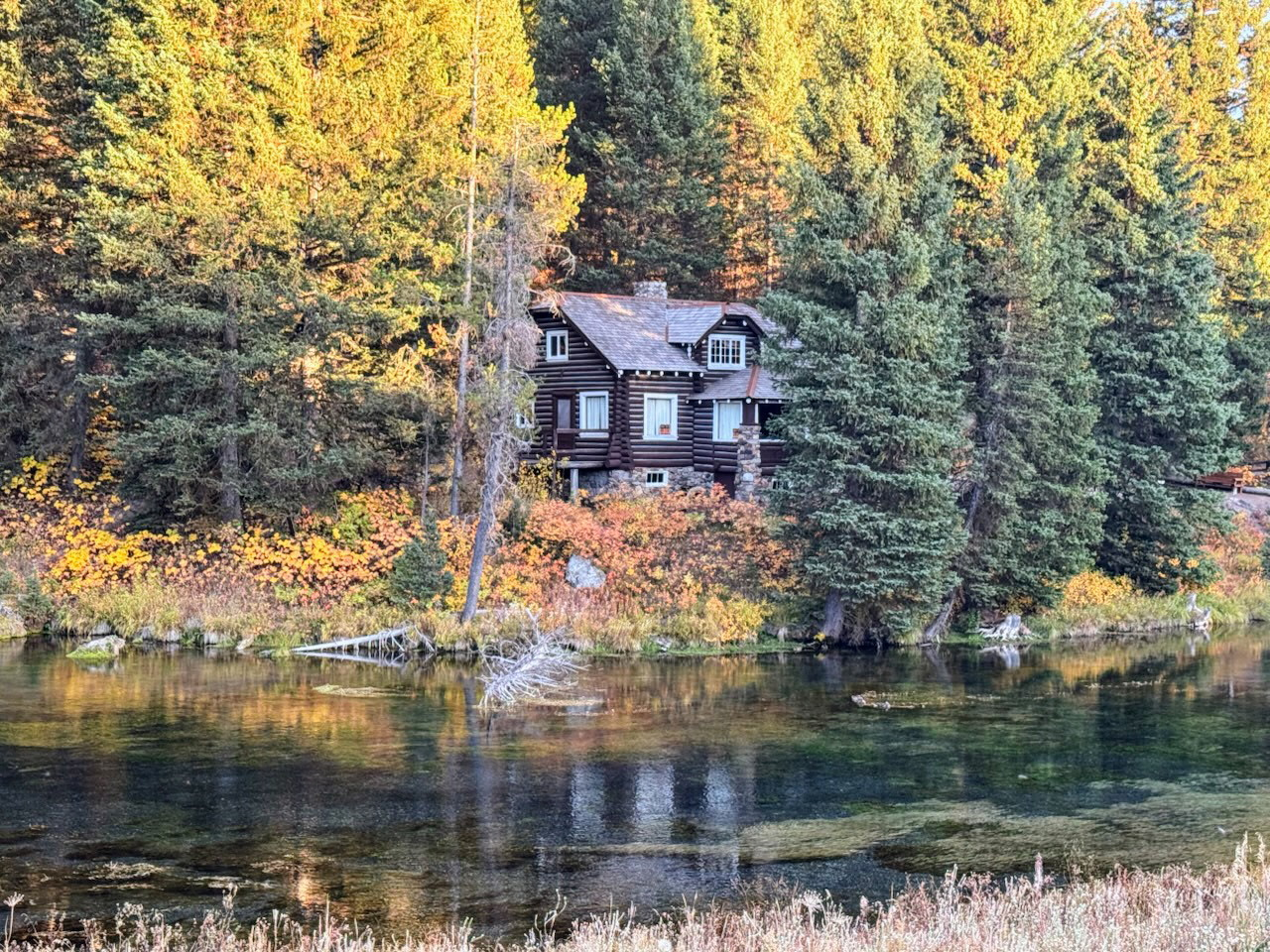

- Location within Idaho Location within the United States
- Location: Big Springs, Idaho, near Island Park, Idaho
- Coordinates: 44.500247°N 111.254945°W
- Area: less than one acre
- Built: 1932-34
- Architectural style: Log Bungalow
- NRHP reference No.: 79000788
- Added to NRHP: April 19, 1979

The Johnny Sack Cabin, at Big Springs, Idaho near Island Park, is a log bungalow built in 1932–34. It was listed on the National Register of Historic Places in 1979.

It is a very well-made bungalow, about 20 by 27 feet (6.1 m × 8.2 m) in plan, with porches as extensions.

It was built by German immigrant carpenter Johnny Sack, but its design seems from then-modern bungalow style, rather than from German origins. It is noted for the use of split-bark in the intricate ornamentation of both the cabin itself and the handcrafted furnishings it contains.

In 2024, the cabin was the subject of Idaho Heritage Trust's second annual Frederick Walters Award for Excellence in Historic Preservation for the use of period-appropriate methods and materials in maintaining the historic character of the cabin and accompanying waterwheel. The award was presented to representatives from the Caribou-Targhee National Forest Ashton/Island Park Ranger District, Fremont County Commissioners, and Fremont County Department of Parks and Recreation officials.
