= North Fork Payette River Bridge =

- U.S. National Register of Historic Places
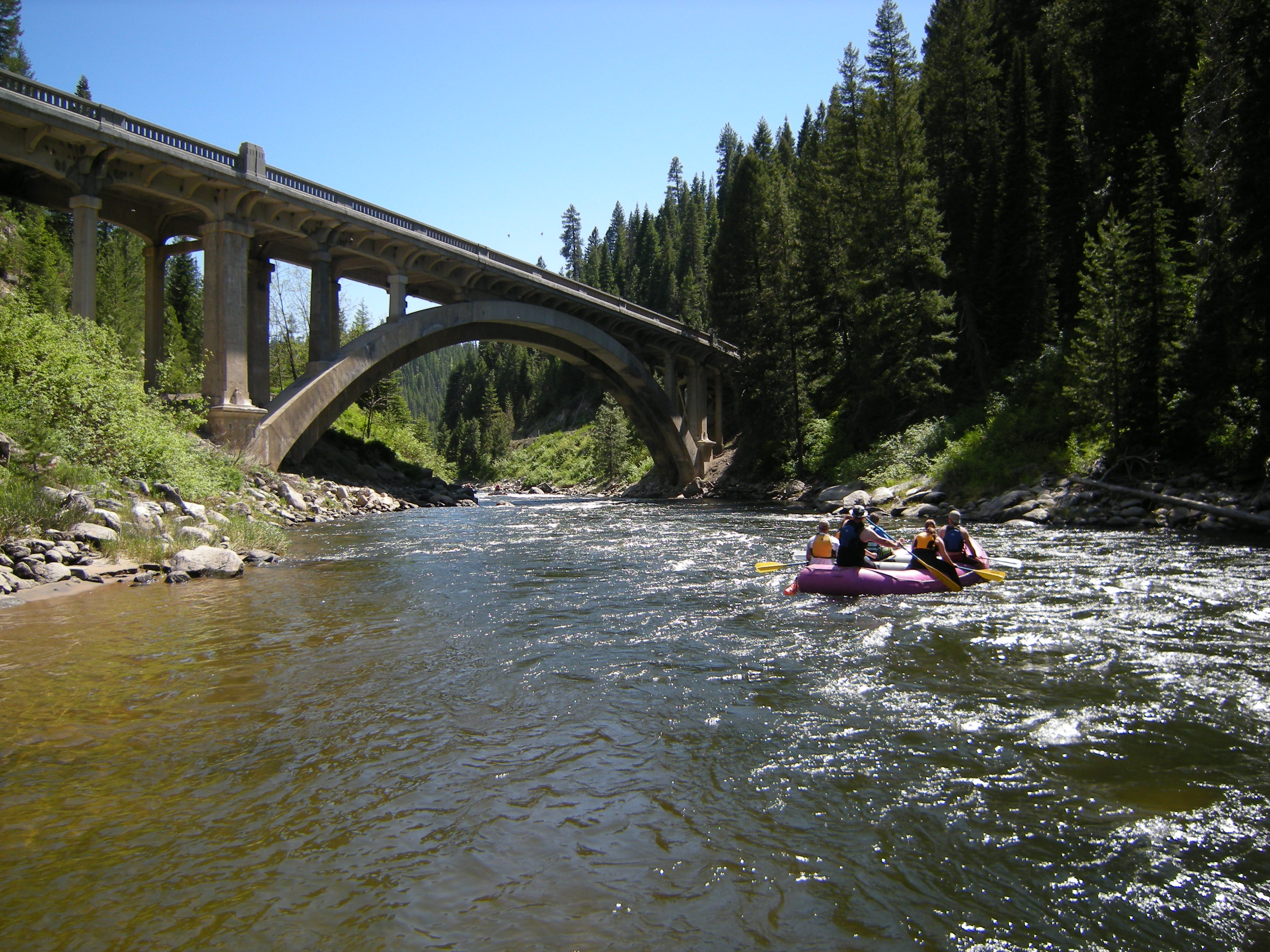

- Location within Idaho Location within the United States
- Nearest city: Smiths Ferry, Idaho
- Coordinates: 44°19′32″N 116°3′30″W
- Area: less than one acre
- Built: 1933
- Built by: Kyle, Charles A.
- Architectural style: reinforced concrete arch
- NRHP reference No.: 99000416
- Added to NRHP: April 2, 1999

The North Fork Payette River Bridge near Smiths Ferry, Idaho is a historic reinforced concrete arch bridge built in 1933. It was a work of Charles A. Kyle. It has also been known as Rainbow Bridge and as 85-2114.

Its 410-foot (120 m) span bridges across the North Fork Payette River. It is significant as the longest single-span arch bridge in Idaho. It is an open spandrel concrete arch bridge. According to a scenic byways guide, "it remains today as a major achievement reflecting leading-edge bridge engineering at the time and shows a conscious effort to maintain the picturesque natural setting."

It was listed on the National Register of Historic Places in 1999.
