= Owsley Bridge =

- U.S. National Register of Historic Places
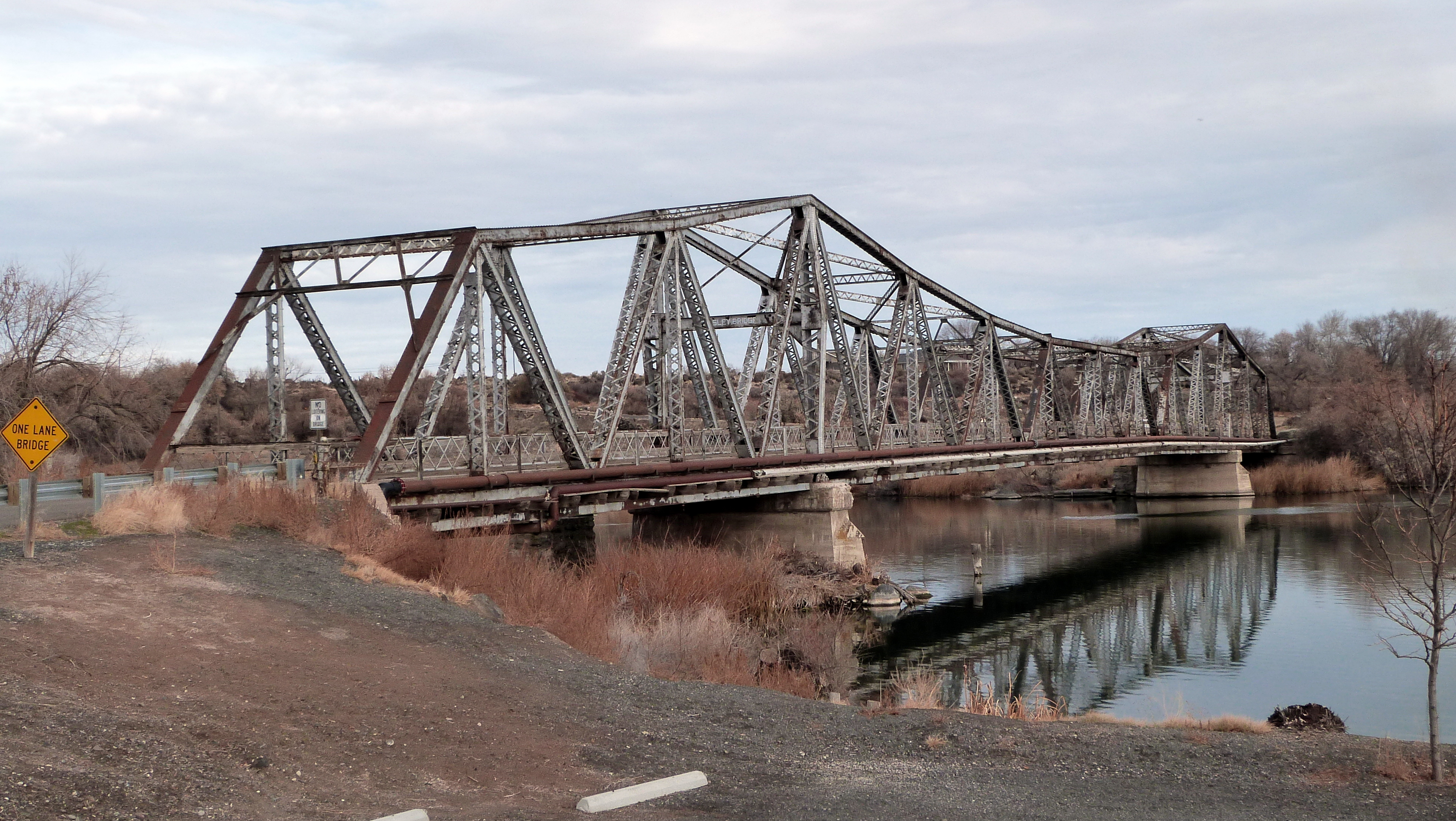
- Owsley Bridge over the Snake River, December 2012

- Location within Idaho Location within the United States
- Location: Twin Falls-Gooding county-line in Idaho, United States
- Nearest city: Hagerman
- Coordinates: 42.764444°N 114.889167°W
- Area: less than one acre
- Built: 1920-21
- Engineer: Kyle, Charles A.
- Architectural style: Cantilevered Warren truss
- NRHP reference No.: 98001172
- Added to NRHP: September 18, 1998

Owsley Bridge is a historic bridge spanning the Snake River on the Twin-Gooding county line in southern Idaho, United States that is listed on the National Register of Historic Places.

== Description ==
The bridge located about 3.6 miles (5.8 km) south Hagerman, approximately 600 feet (180 m) north of the junction of old U.S. Route 30 (US‑30) and Bell Rapids Road, and was on the former routing of US‑30. It is a cantilevered Warren truss bridge built in 1920–21.

The bridge cost about $127,000 (equivalent to $2.29 million in 2025). The engineer for the state of Idaho was Charles A. Kyle of the Bureau of Highways, Division of Public Works. The builder was United States Bridge Company of Boise, Idaho; the fabricator was the Minneapolis Steel & Machinery Company.

It was listed on the National Register of Historic Places on September 18, 1998.

== See also ==
- List of bridges on the National Register of Historic Places in Idaho
- National Register of Historic Places listings in Gooding County, Idaho
- National Register of Historic Places listings in Twin Falls County, Idaho
