= Conant Creek Pegram Truss Railroad Bridge =

- U.S. National Register of Historic Places
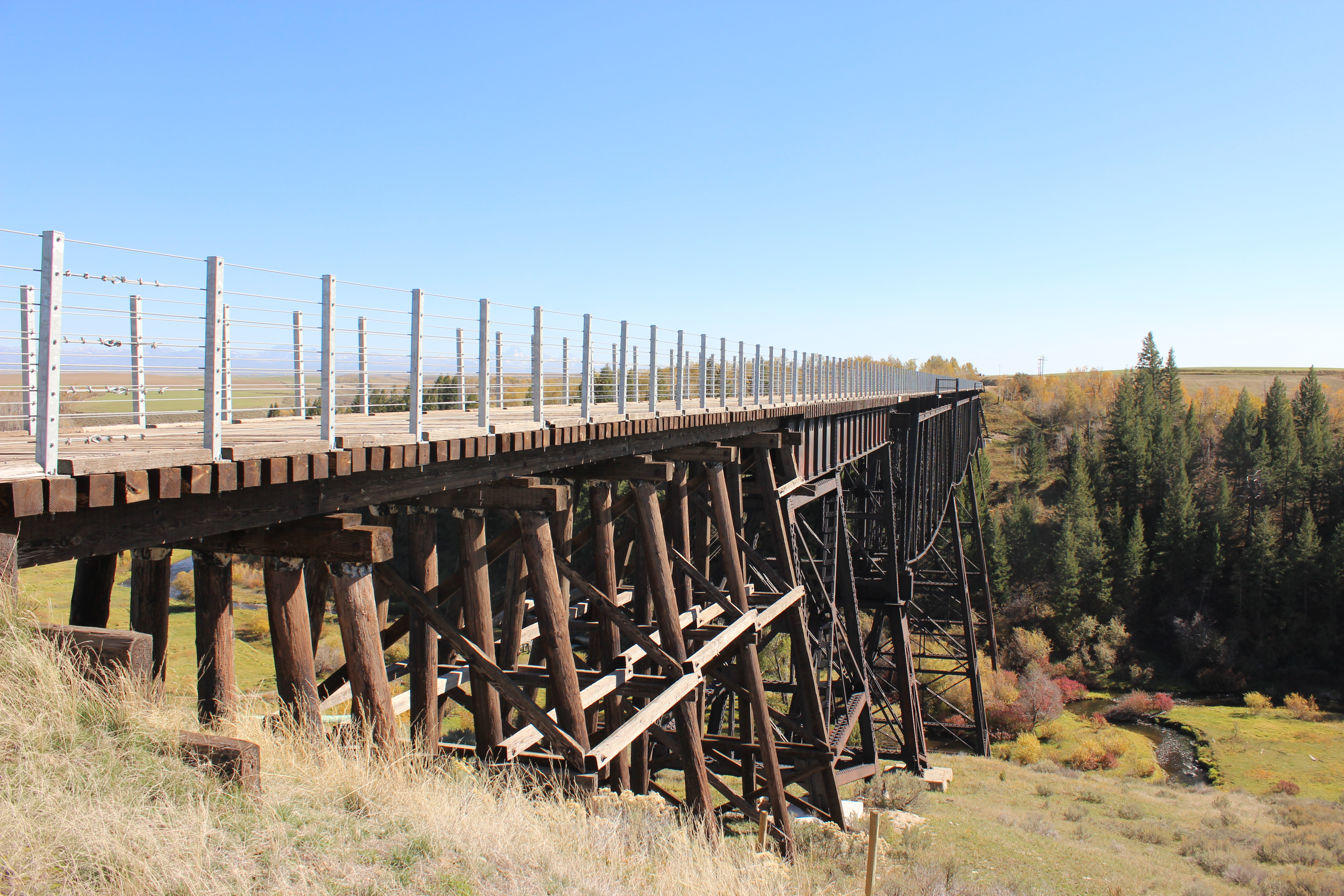
- As a rail trail bridge in 2014

- Location within Idaho Location within the United States
- Nearest city: Grainville, Idaho
- Coordinates: 44.014317°N 111.364644°W
- Area: less than one acre
- Built: 1911
- Architect: George H. Pregram
- Architectural style: Pregram truss bridge
- MPS: Pegram Truss Railroad Bridges of Idaho MPS
- NRHP reference No.: 97000756
- Added to NRHP: July 25, 1997

The Conant Creek Pegram Truss Railroad Bridge, in Fremont County, Idaho near Grainville, Idaho and Ashton, Idaho, was built in 1894. It brought a railroad over the Conant Creek, 1 mile south of the junction of Squirrel Rd. and the old Ashton-Victor railroad spur tracks. It is a Pegram truss bridge, designed by George H. Pegram. It was listed on the National Register of Historic Places in 1997.

It now carries the Ashton-Tetonia Trail, and is known as the Conant Creek Trestle.

It is a 780 feet (240 m) long bridge, spanning across four supporting steel towers, built to carry a single railroad track. The towers, fabricated in 1911 by the American Bridge Company. The two center towers are about 107 feet (33 m) high, and with 30 feet (9.1 m) of truss above, the total distance from base to railroad bed is 137 feet (42 m). The three central spans are pin-connected Pegram truss deck spans, each 164 feet (50 m) long and 14 feet (4.3 m) wide, with a maximum depth of 30 feet (9.1 m). At each end are steel deck girders 60 feet (18 m) long at the north end and 30 feet (9.1 m) at the south end, and then timber approach spans 60 and 45 feet long.

It was built in 1911 with Pegram spans that had been fabricated in 1894 by the Union Bridge Company of New York, and had been used previously at a Snake River crossing at American Falls, Idaho. The trusses were reinforced in 1916 with an additional, similar span along the centerline, manufactured by the American Bridge Company. In 1927 the steel girders were put into place, replacing original 1911 timber Howe trusses; these girders are believed to have been fabricated by Paxton & Verling Iron Works.

The rails were removed when the line was abandoned, several years before the 1997 National Register listing.

== See also ==
- National Register of Historic Places listings in Fremont County, Idaho
