= Cold Springs Pegram Truss Railroad Bridge =

- U.S. National Register of Historic Places
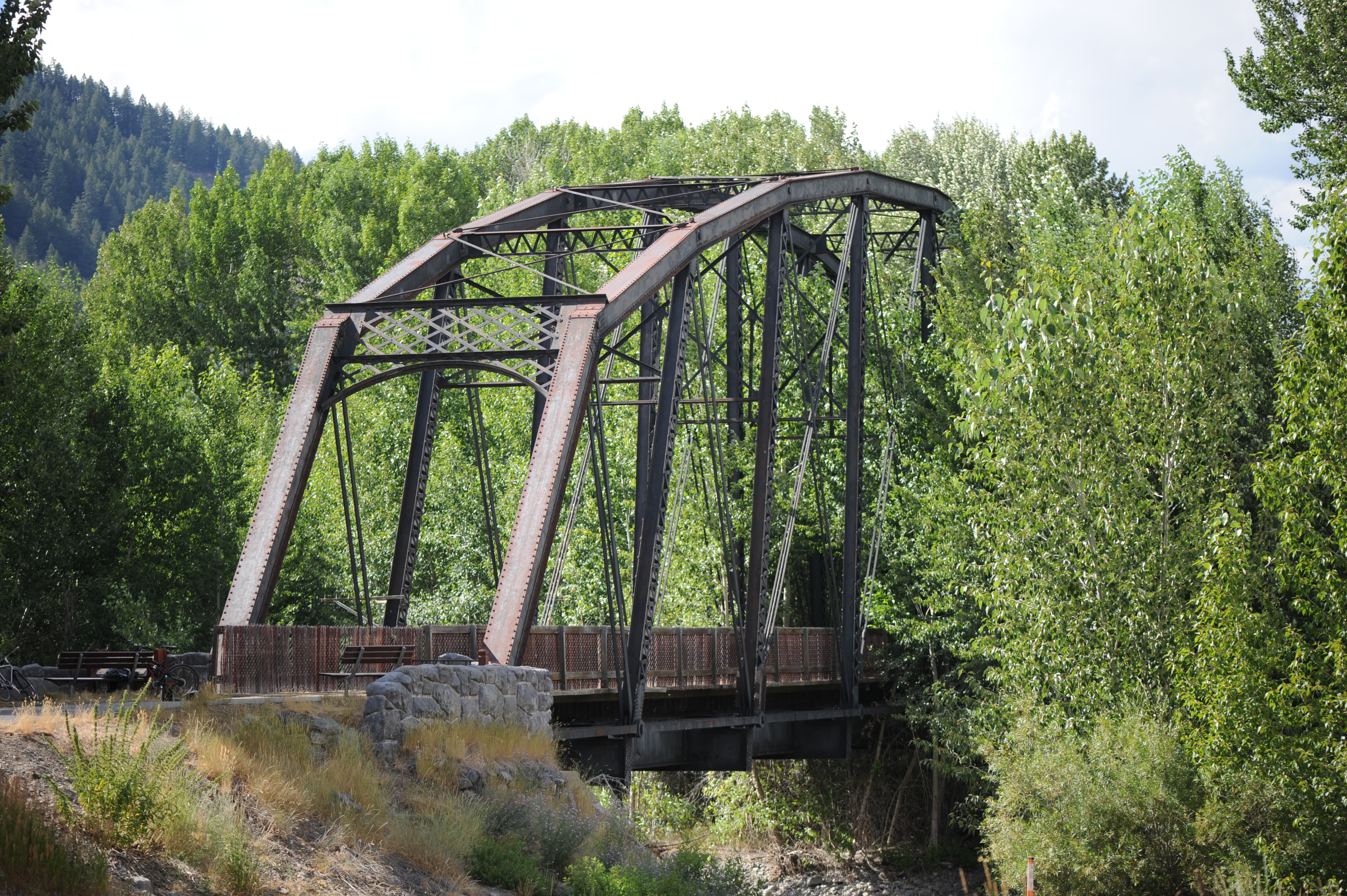

- Location within Idaho Location within the United States
- Location: Approx. 1/2 m. S. of jct. of US 93 and SH 267, near Ketchum, Idaho
- Coordinates: 43°39′15″N 114°20′55″W
- Area: less than one acre
- Built: 1894
- Architect: George H. Pegram
- MPS: Pegram Truss Railroad Bridges of Idaho MPS
- NRHP reference No.: 97000762
- Added to NRHP: July 25, 1997

The Cold Springs Bridge is a 208-foot, single span Pegram truss bridge in Blaine County, Idaho. It is 17 feet (5.2 m) wide. It provides 21 feet (6.4 m) clearance above a roadbed below.

The Cold Springs Bridge was constructed in 1884 at the Snake River Crossing in Ontario, Oregon. In 1917, the bridge was disassembled and relocated to Blaine County, Idaho. It crosses the Big Wood River 2 miles south of Ketchum, Idaho. This bridge served the Union Pacific from 1936 to 1981 bringing skiers on luxury trains to Sun Valley, Idaho. In 1984, the Blaine County recreation district converted the bridge to pedestrian use.

In 1997, the bridge was placed on the National Register of Historic Places.
