= Ririe B Pegram Truss Railroad Bridge =

- U.S. National Register of Historic Places
- Location within Idaho Location within the United States
- Nearest city: Ririe, Idaho
- Coordinates: 43°39′44″N 111°44′25″W
- Area: less than one acre
- Built: 1914
- Architect: Pegram, George H.
- Architectural style: Pegram through truss bridge
- MPS: Pegram Truss Railroad Bridges of Idaho MPS
- NRHP reference No.: 97000760
- Added to NRHP: July 25, 1997

The Ririe B Pegram Truss Railroad Bridge is a Pegram truss railroad bridge which crosses the flood channel of the Snake River north of Ririe, Idaho. The single-span bridge, which carries a single track of the East Belt Branch, is 210 feet (64 m) long and 18 feet (5.5 m) wide. The bridge was originally constructed for a Union Pacific Railroad crossing in Nyssa, Oregon in 1894 and was relocated to its current site in 1914, where it carried Oregon Short Line Railroad tracks. The bridge's Pegram truss design was the work of George H. Pegram, the chief engineer for Union Pacific; as Pegram held a patent on the design, all surviving Pegram truss bridges were commissioned during Pegram's tenure with the Union Pacific and Missouri Pacific railroads.

The bridge was added to the National Register of Historic Places on July 25, 1997.

== See also ==
- List of National Historic Landmarks in Idaho
- National Register of Historic Places listings in Jefferson County, Idaho
- Ririe A Pegram Truss Railroad Bridge, another Pegram truss bridge on the East Belt Branch
