= St. Anthony Pegram Truss Railroad Bridge =

- U.S. National Register of Historic Places
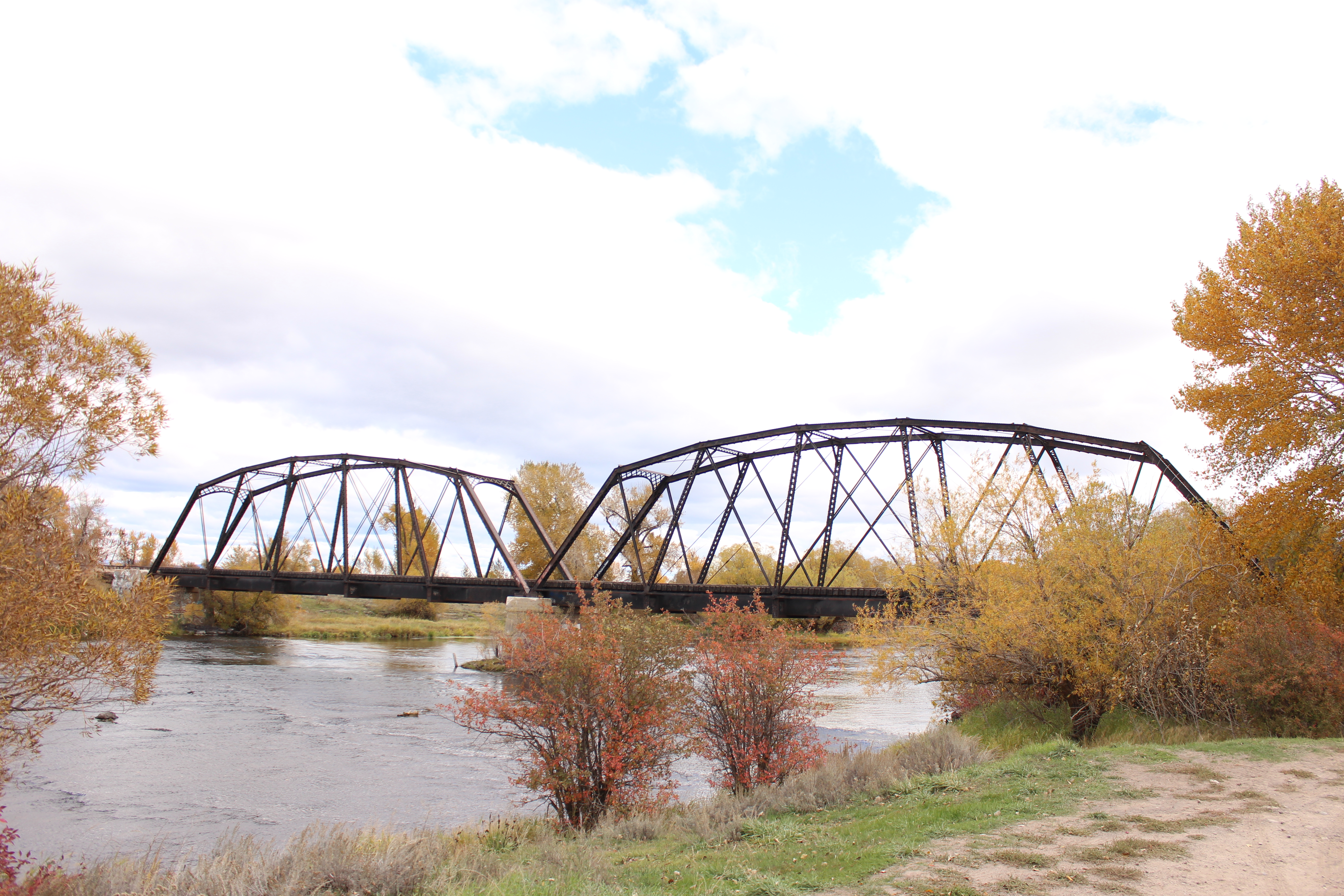

- Location within Idaho Location within the United States
- Nearest city: St. Anthony, Idaho
- Coordinates: 43°57′01″N 111°42′59″W
- Area: less than one acre
- Built: 1896
- Built by: Pencoyd Iron Works
- Architect: George H. Pregram
- Architectural style: Pregram through truss bridge
- MPS: Pegram Truss Railroad Bridges of Idaho MPS
- NRHP reference No.: 97000761
- Added to NRHP: July 25, 1997

The St. Anthony Pegram Truss Railroad Bridge, in Fremont County, Idaho near St. Anthony, Idaho, was built in 1896. It was listed on the National Register of Historic Places in 1997.

It is a Pegram truss through truss railroad bridge designed by George H. Pegram.

It brought the West Belt Branch of the former Oregon Short Line (later Union Pacific) railroad across Henry's Fork of the Snake River.

It has two identical Pegram truss through spans, each 135 feet (41 m) long and 16 feet (4.9 m) wide. The total length of the bridge, including across concrete abutments, is about 275 feet (84 m).

It was fabricated in 1896 by the Pencoyd Iron Works in Philadelphia, Pennsylvania and was originally used to span either the Weiser River near Weiser, Idaho or the Payette River near Payette, Idaho. It was moved to its current location in 1914 during construction of the West Belt Branch of the Oregon Short Line.

It is located about 2 miles (3.2 km) southwest of St. Anthony, Idaho.
