= Gimlet Pegram Truss Railroad Bridge =

- Gimlet Bridge
- U.S. National Register of Historic Places
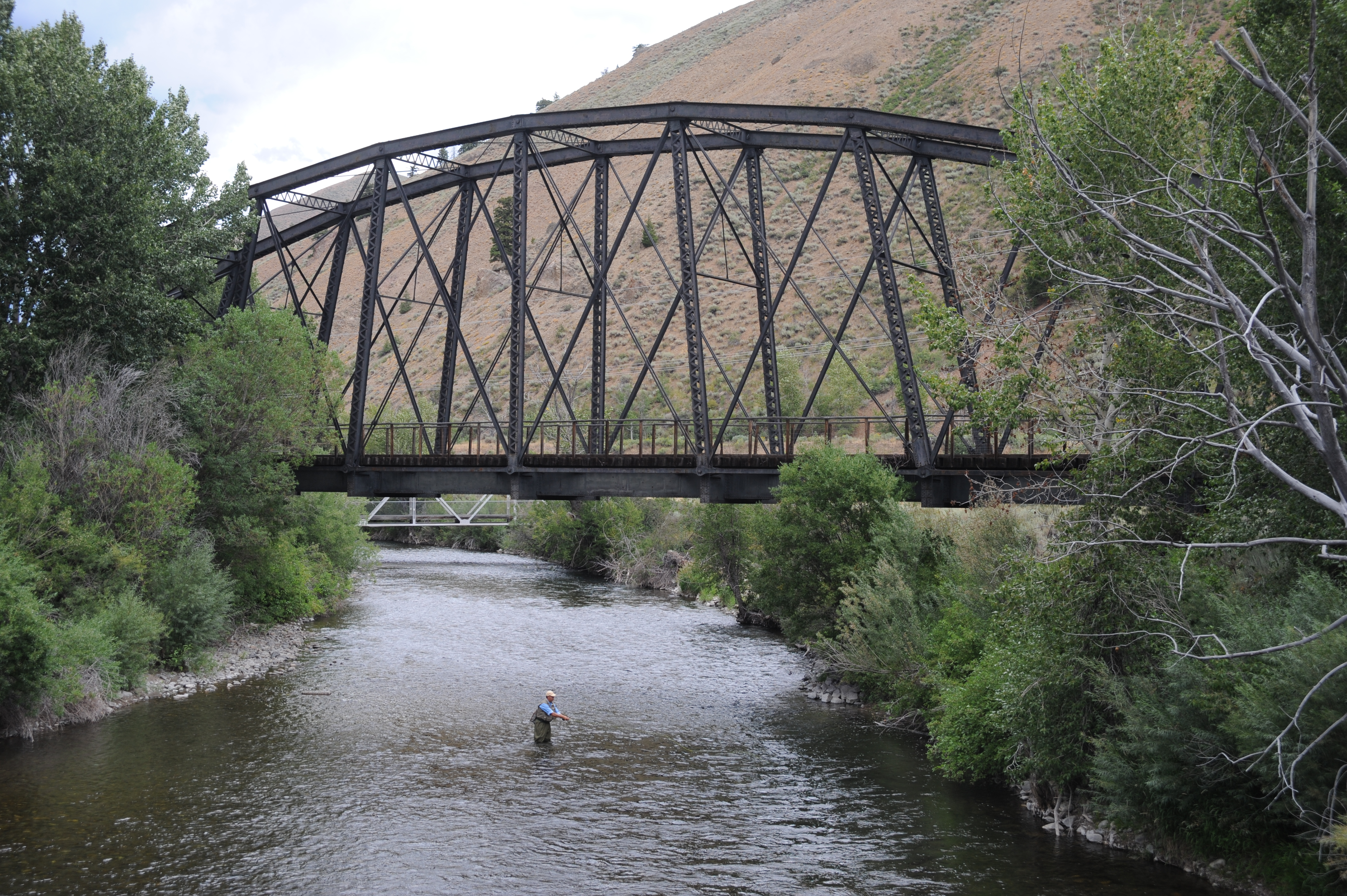

- Location within Idaho Location within the United States
- Location: Approx. 1/2 m. S. of jct. of US 93 and East Fork Wood River Rd., near Ketchum, Idaho
- Coordinates: 43°35′53″N 114°20′45″W
- Area: less than one acre
- Built: 1894
- Architect: George H. Pegram
- Architectural style: Pegram through truss bridge
- MPS: Pegram Truss Railroad Bridges of Idaho MPS
- NRHP reference No.: 97000757
- Added to NRHP: July 25, 1997

The Gimlet Bridge is a 217-foot, single span Pegram truss railroad bridge in Blaine County, Idaho. It is 17 feet (5.2 m) and is supported by concrete piers at each end. It provides 21 feet (6.4 m) clearance above a roadbed below.

The Gimlet Bridge was constructed in 1894. In 1914, the bridge was disassembled and relocated to Blaine County, Idaho. It crosses the Big Wood River 6 miles south of Ketchum, Idaho. This bridge served the Union Pacific from 1936 to 1981 bringing skiers on luxury trains to Sun Valley, Idaho. In 1984, the Blaine County recreation district converted the bridge to pedestrian use. In 1997, the bridge was placed on the National Register of Historic Places.

The bridge was fabricated in 1894 by the Edge Moor Bridge Works of Wilmington, Delaware.
