= Grace Pegram Truss Railroad Bridge =

- U.S. National Register of Historic Places
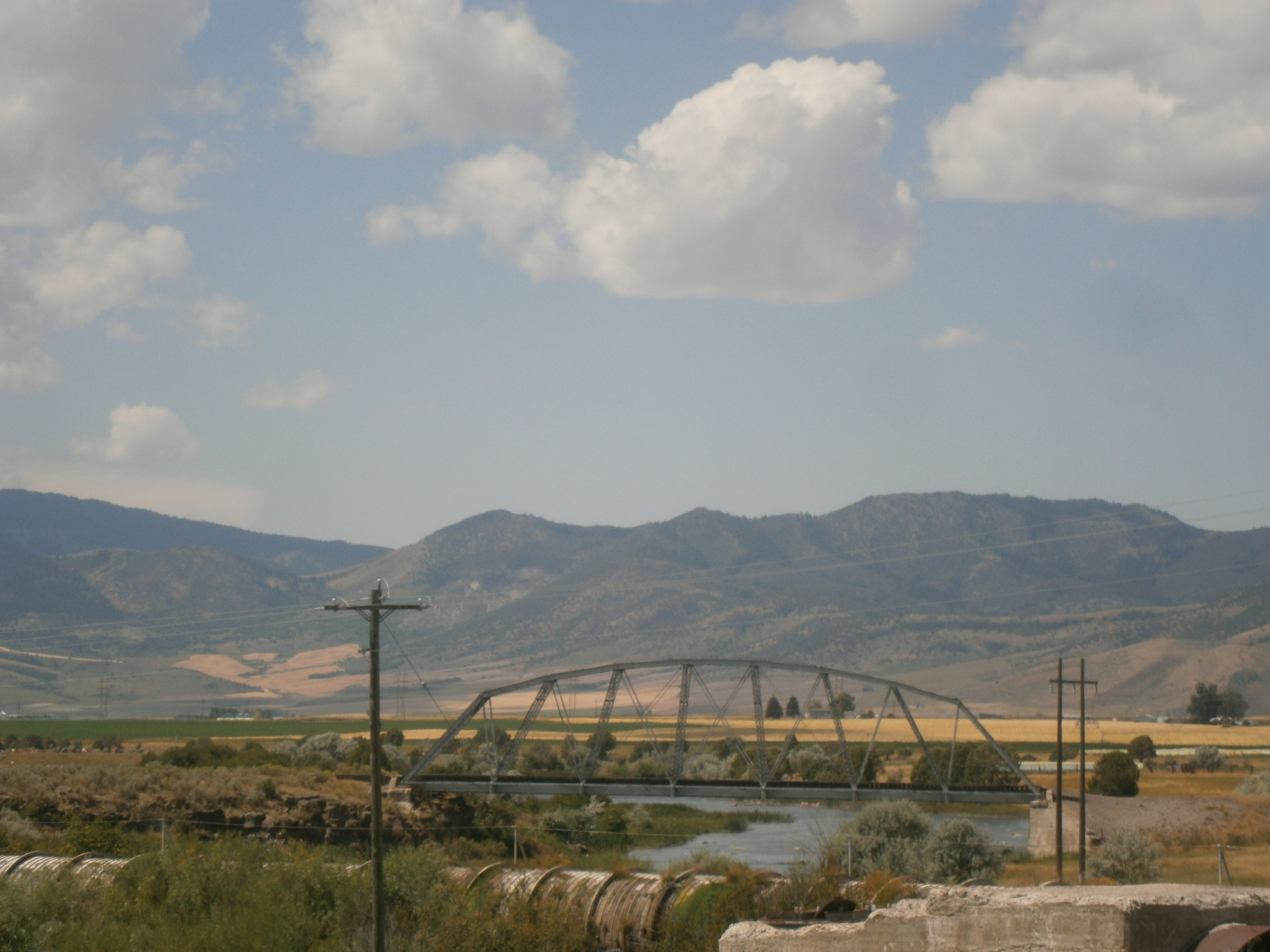
- View from Idaho State Highway 34 on the east

- Location within Idaho Location within the United States
- Location: Over the Bear River 0.5 miles (0.80 km) north-northwest of the junction of State Highway 34 and Turner Rd., in or near Grace, Idaho
- Coordinates: 42°35′6″N 111°44′5″W
- Area: less than one acre
- Built: 1894, 1913
- Architect: Pegram, George H.
- Architectural style: Pegram through truss bridge
- MPS: Pegram Truss Railroad Bridges of Idaho MPS
- NRHP reference No.: 97000758
- Added to NRHP: July 25, 1997

Grace Pegram Truss Railroad Bridge is a Pegram through truss bridge over the Bear River near Grace, Idaho.

It was originally built in 1894 and was moved to its current location by the Union Pacific in 1913.

It is a single-span pin-connected Pegram through truss bridge consisting of seven panels, supported by concrete abutments, which is 172 feet (52 m) long and about 15 feet (4.6 m) wide, about 12 feet (3.7 m) above the riverbed.
