= National Register of Historic Places listings in Valley County, Idaho =

Location of Valley County in Idaho

Valley County, Idaho, United States, has 27 properties and districts listed on the National Register of Historic Places.

Latitude and longitude coordinates are provided for many National Register properties and districts; these locations may be seen together in a map.

This National Park Service list is complete through NPS recent listings posted October 16, 2026.

== Current listings ==
	Name on the Register	Image	Date listed	Location	City or town	Description
1	Big Creek Commissary		April 21, 2000 (#00000327)	Yellow Pine in the Payette National Forest; 45°08′16″N 115°19′08″W	Yellow Pine	
2	Braddock Gold Mining and Milling Company Log Building and Forge Ruins		September 12, 1985 (#85002157)	Off Pack Trail near Suicide Rock; 44°59′21″N 115°08′09″W	Thunder City	
3	Cabin Creek Ranch		June 27, 1990 (#90000890)	Cabin Creek at its confluence with Big Creek in the Payette National Forest; 45°08′14″N 114°56′01″W	Black Butte	
4	Elo School	Elo School	July 26, 1982 (#82002515)	Southeast of State Highway 55 on Farm to Market Rd. 44°53′10″N 116°03′34″W	McCall vicinity	
5	Matt N. Hill Homestead Barn	Matt N. Hill Homestead Barn	November 17, 1982 (#82000362)	Southeast of McCall; 44°53′02″N 116°03′26″W	McCall vicinity	
6	Thomas Jarvi Homestead		November 17, 1982 (#82000363)	East of Lake Fork on Finn Rd. 44°49′58″N 116°04′49″W	Lake Fork	
7	Johnson Flying Service Hangar	Johnson Flying Service Hangar	November 20, 2019 (#100004675)	103 S. 3rd St. 44°53′51″N 116°05′47″W	McCall	
8	John G. Johnson (Rintakangas) Homestead	John G. Johnson (Rintakangas) Homestead	November 17, 1982 (#82000364)	Northeast of Lake Fork off Pearson Rd. 44°52′01″N 116°02′56″W	Lake Fork	
9	John S. Johnson (Sampila) Homestead	John S. Johnson (Sampila) Homestead	November 17, 1982 (#82000365)	Northeast of Lake Fork off Pearson Rd. 44°51′40″N 116°03′33″W	Lake Fork	
10	John Korvola Homestead	John Korvola Homestead	November 17, 1982 (#82000366)	Roseberry Rd. and Farm to Market Rd. 44°44′12″N 116°04′20″W	Donnelly vicinity	
11	Charles Koski Homestead	Charles Koski Homestead	November 17, 1982 (#82000367)	Southeast of McCall; 44°53′16″N 116°05′03″W	McCall vicinity	
12	Krassel Ranger Station		November 19, 1992 (#92000688)	Along the South Fork of the Salmon River, 11 miles west of Yellow Pine, in the Payette National Forest; 44°58′14″N 115°43′53″W	Yellow Pine	
13	Gust Laituri Homestead	Gust Laituri Homestead	November 17, 1982 (#82000368)	Northeast of Lake Fork off Pearson Rd. 44°51′40″N 116°04′41″W	Lake Fork	
14	Long Valley Finnish Church	Long Valley Finnish Church	May 27, 1980 (#80001336)	Southeast of Lake Fork; 44°49′05″N 116°02′46″W	Lake Fork	
15	Jacob and Herman Mahala Homestead	Jacob and Herman Mahala Homestead	November 17, 1982 (#82000369)	North of Donnelly; 44°43′55″N 116°02′42″W	Donnelly vicinity	
16	Jacob Maki Homestead	Jacob Maki Homestead	November 17, 1982 (#82001053)	Off State Highway 55; 44°49′19″N 116°05′53″W	Donnelly vicinity	
17	McCall District Administrative Site	McCall District Administrative Site	December 30, 1991 (#91001892)	Junction of W. Lake and Mission Sts. 44°54′35″N 116°06′21″W	McCall	
18	North Fork Payette River Bridge	North Fork Payette River Bridge	April 2, 1999 (#99000416)	State Highway 55, approximately 2.5 miles north of Smiths Ferry; 44°19′32″N 116°03′30″W	Smiths Ferry	
19	Herman Ojala Homestead		November 17, 1982 (#82000370)	Northeast of Lake Fork off Pearson Rd. 44°51′58″N 116°04′48″W	Lake Fork	
20	Payette Lakes Club	Payette Lakes Club	April 24, 2017 (#100000905)	1858 Warren Wagon Rd. 44°55′26″N 116°07′40″W	McCall vicinity	
21	Rice Meetinghouse	Rice Meetinghouse	April 9, 1980 (#80001337)	Northeast of McCall; 44°55′46″N 116°03′50″W	McCall vicinity	
22	Roxy Theatre		October 21, 2026 (#100013535)	114 S. Main Street; 44°30′56″N 116°02′29″W	Cascade	
23	Matt Ruatsale Homestead	Matt Ruatsale Homestead	November 17, 1982 (#82000371)	North of Kantola Lane; 44°49′42″N 116°02′44″W	Lake Fork	
24	Southern Idaho Timber Protective Association (SITPA) Buildings	Southern Idaho Timber Protective Association (SITPA) Buildings	May 2, 1990 (#90000680)	1001 State St. 44°54′35″N 116°06′29″W	McCall	
25	Southern Idaho Timber Protective Association (SITPA) Buildings	Southern Idaho Timber Protective Association (SITPA) Buildings	May 2, 1990 (#90000681)	State Highway 55; 44°18′04″N 116°05′21″W	Smiths Ferry	
26	Stibnite Historic District	Stibnite Historic District	July 19, 1987 (#87001186)	United States Forest Service Road 412; 44°54′39″N 115°20′17″W	Yellow Pine	
27	Nickolai Wargelin Homestead	Nickolai Wargelin Homestead	November 17, 1982 (#82000372)	Southeast of McCall; 44°53′03″N 116°04′05″W	McCall vicinity	

== Former listings ==
	Name on the Register	Image	Date listed	Date removed	Location	City or town	Description
1	Brown Tie and Lumber Company Mill and Burner		December 20, 1978 (#78001103)	January 31, 1986	Off ID 55 at Payette Lake	McCall	Destroyed by fire.

== See also ==
- List of National Historic Landmarks in Idaho
- National Register of Historic Places listings in Idaho
