= Buhl IOOF Building =

- U.S. National Register of Historic Places
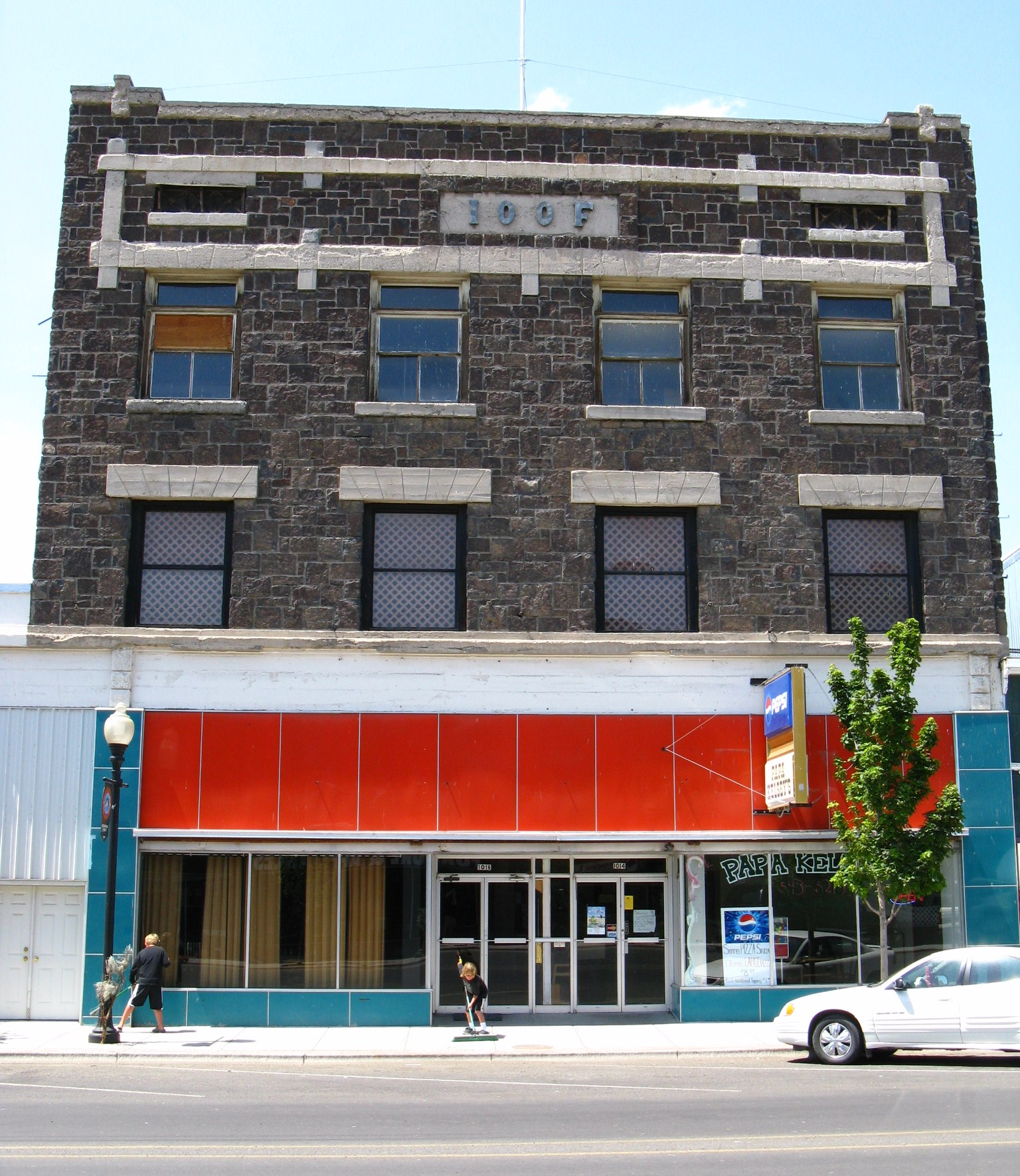
- Facade of building from Main St.

- Location within Idaho Location within the United States
- Location: 1014-16 Main St., Buhl, Idaho
- Coordinates: 42°35′56″N 114°45′35″W
- Area: less than one acre
- Built: 1919-20
- Architect: B. Morgan Nisbet
- Architectural style: Early Commercial Style, Chicago
- NRHP reference No.: 84000482
- Added to NRHP: December 27, 1984

The Buhl IOOF Building in Buhl, Idaho is an Odd Fellows building that was built in 1919–20. It served historically as a clubhouse, as a meeting hall, as a specialty store, and as a business. It was designed in the early commercial style, perhaps the Chicago style. It was listed on the National Register of Historic Places in 1984.

It is a three-story 50 feet (15 m) wide by 120 feet (37 m) deep building with an unusual dressed lava rock (basalt) facade. Tourtellotte and Hummel architect Benjamin Morgan Nisbet designed the hall and also the adjacent Buhl City Hall.

== See also ==
- List of Odd Fellows buildings
