= Gust Laituri Homestead =

- Laituri, Gust, Homestead
- U.S. National Register of Historic Places
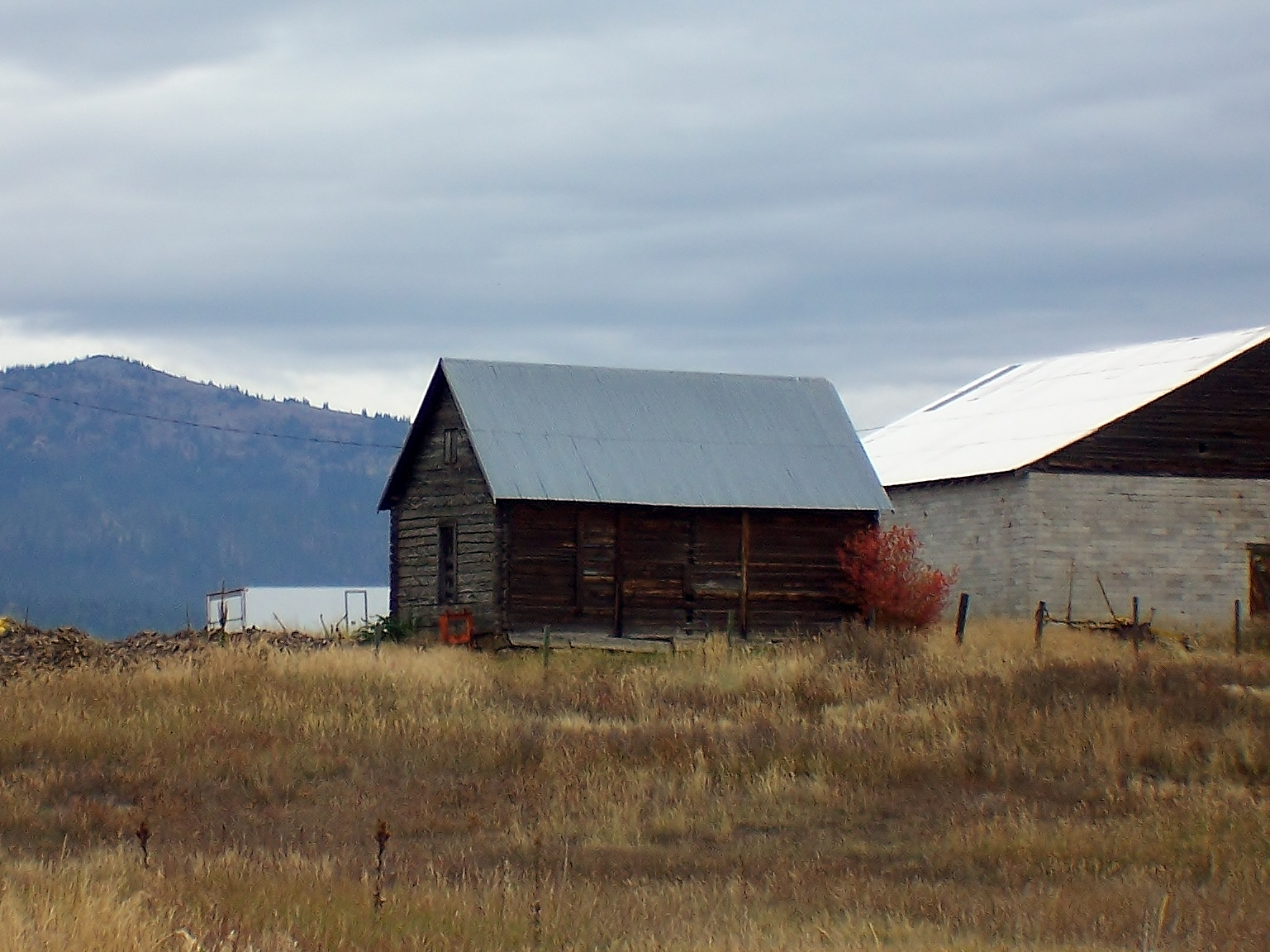

- Location within Idaho Location within the United States
- Nearest city: Lake Fork, Idaho
- Coordinates: 44°51′40″N 116°04′41″W
- Area: 2.5 acres (1.0 ha)
- Built: c.1905
- Built by: Gust Laituri
- Architectural style: Finnish Log Structure
- MPS: Long Valley Finnish Structures TR
- NRHP reference No.: 82000368
- Added to NRHP: November 17, 1982

The Gust Laituri Homestead, in Valley County, Idaho near Lake Fork, Idaho, was listed on the National Register of Historic Places in 1982.

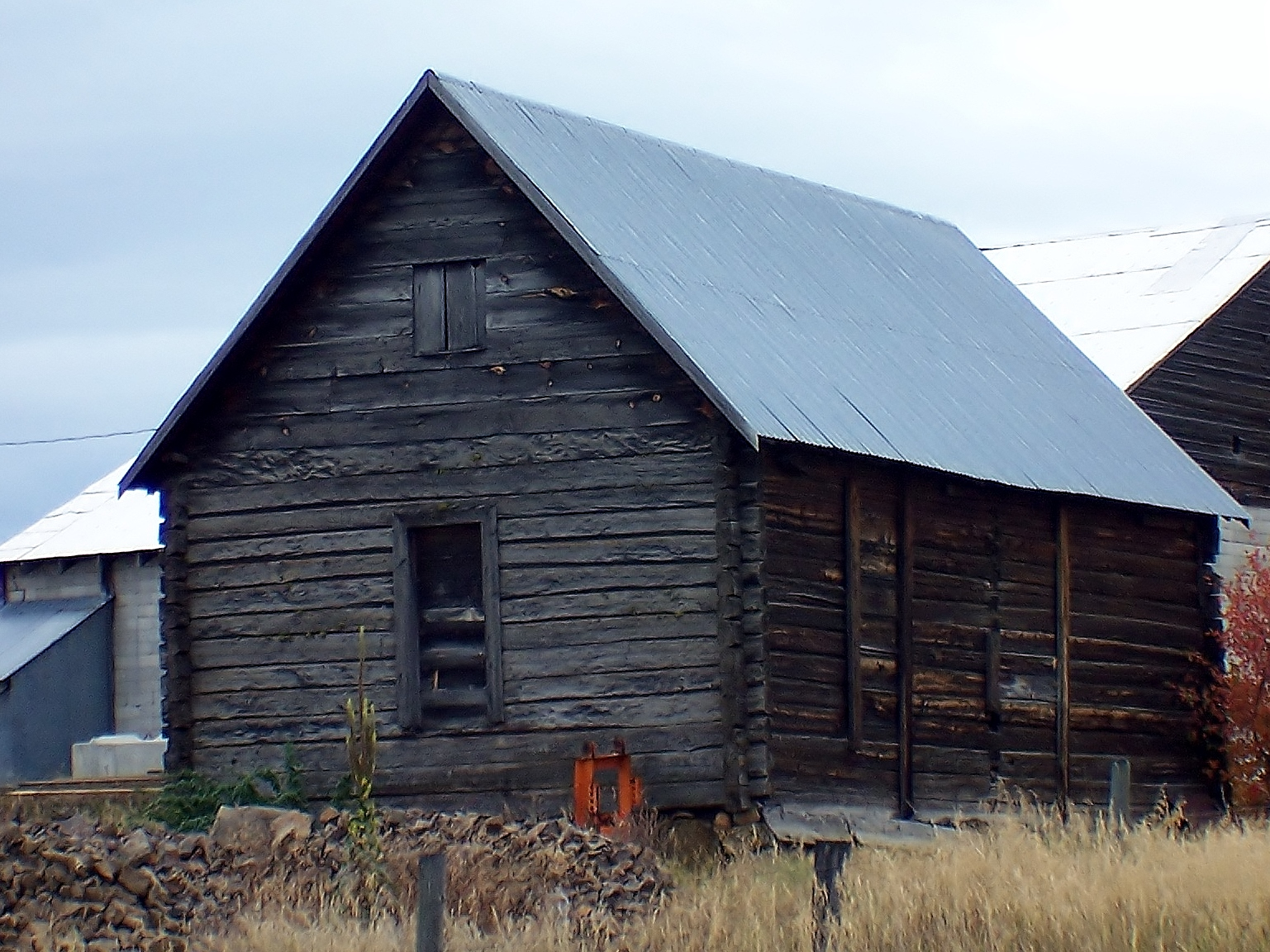
Another view

It was built by 1905 by Gust Laituri, who died in 1906.

It is a Finnish Log Structure in Long Valley, Idaho. It is about 15 by 30 feet (4.6 m × 9.1 m) in plan. It is located about 3 miles (4.8 km) northeast of Lakefork, Idaho off Pearson Road.
