= Rice Meetinghouse =

- U.S. National Register of Historic Places
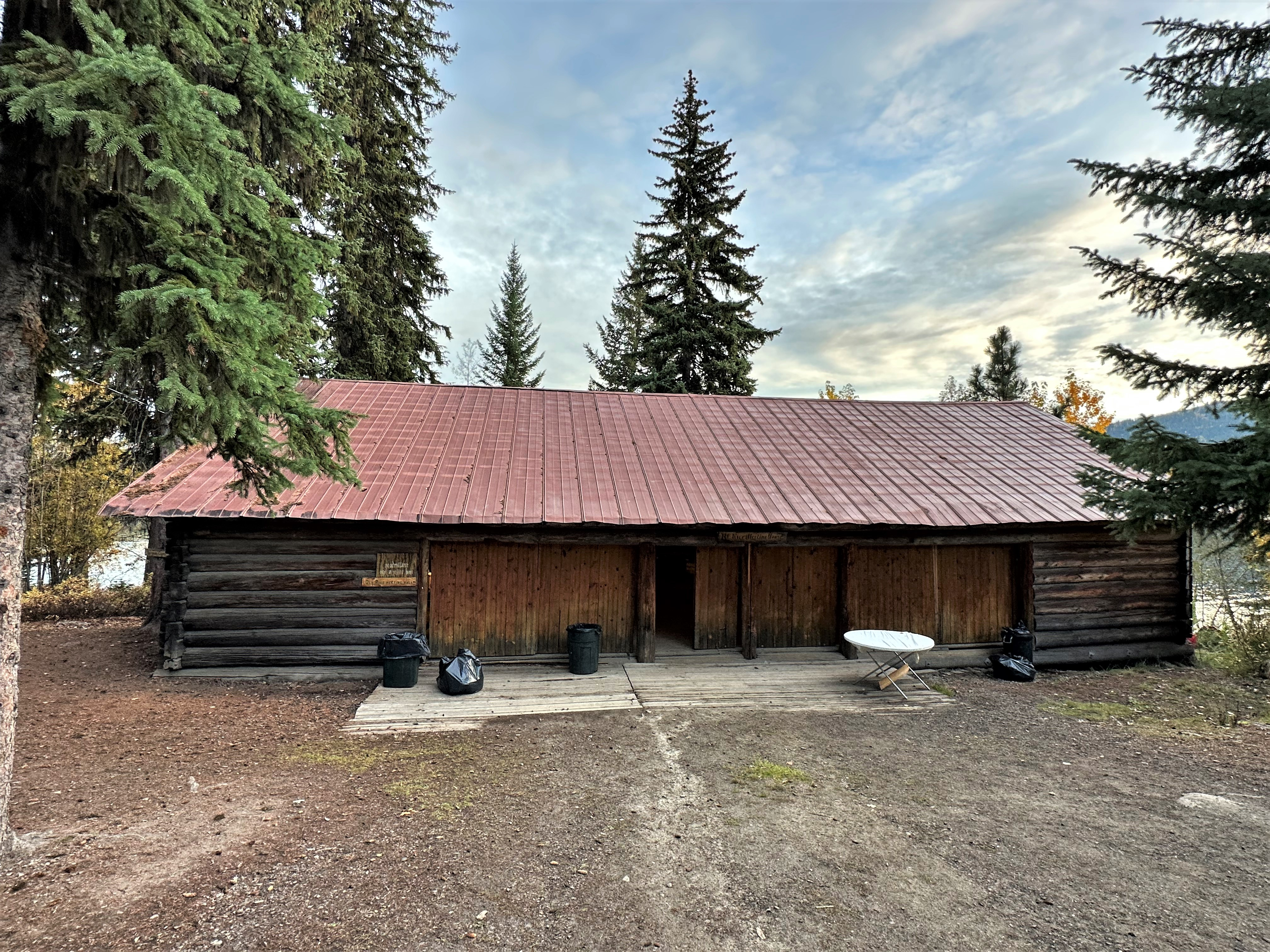

- Location within Idaho Location within the United States
- Location: Northeast of McCall, Idaho
- Coordinates: 44°55′46″N 116°03′50″W
- Area: less than one acre
- Built: 1928
- Built by: Gus Gustafson
- Architectural style: Finnish log cabin arch.
- NRHP reference No.: 80001337
- Added to NRHP: April 9, 1980

The Rice Meetinghouse, in Valley County, Idaho northeast of McCall, Idaho, was built in 1928 for the Idaho Conference of Congregational Churches. It was listed on the National Register of Historic Places in 1980.

It is a one-room log building located among evergreen trees on the east shore of Payette Lake. It is about 60 by 35 feet (18 m × 11 m) in plan, and was built by volunteers by hand, using hand hewn logs and hand-whittled pegs. The logs have squared ends and are interlocked by saddle notching. Finnish carpenter Gus Gustafson supervised and the building reflects Finnish log cabin architecture or Finnish folk architecture and Rustic architecture. Finnish elements are the use of a vara tool to cut each new horizontal log to fit smoothly on the log below, not requiring chinking.

The building is "a local landmark, as well as one of the better crafted and preserved log buildings in the southwest Idaho." Also in the area are the much larger St. Georg Hotel and the Payette Lakes Club. (The latter was built 1914-15 and was NRHP-listed in 2017.)
