= Long Valley Finnish Church =

Historic church in Idaho, United States

- U.S. National Register of Historic Places
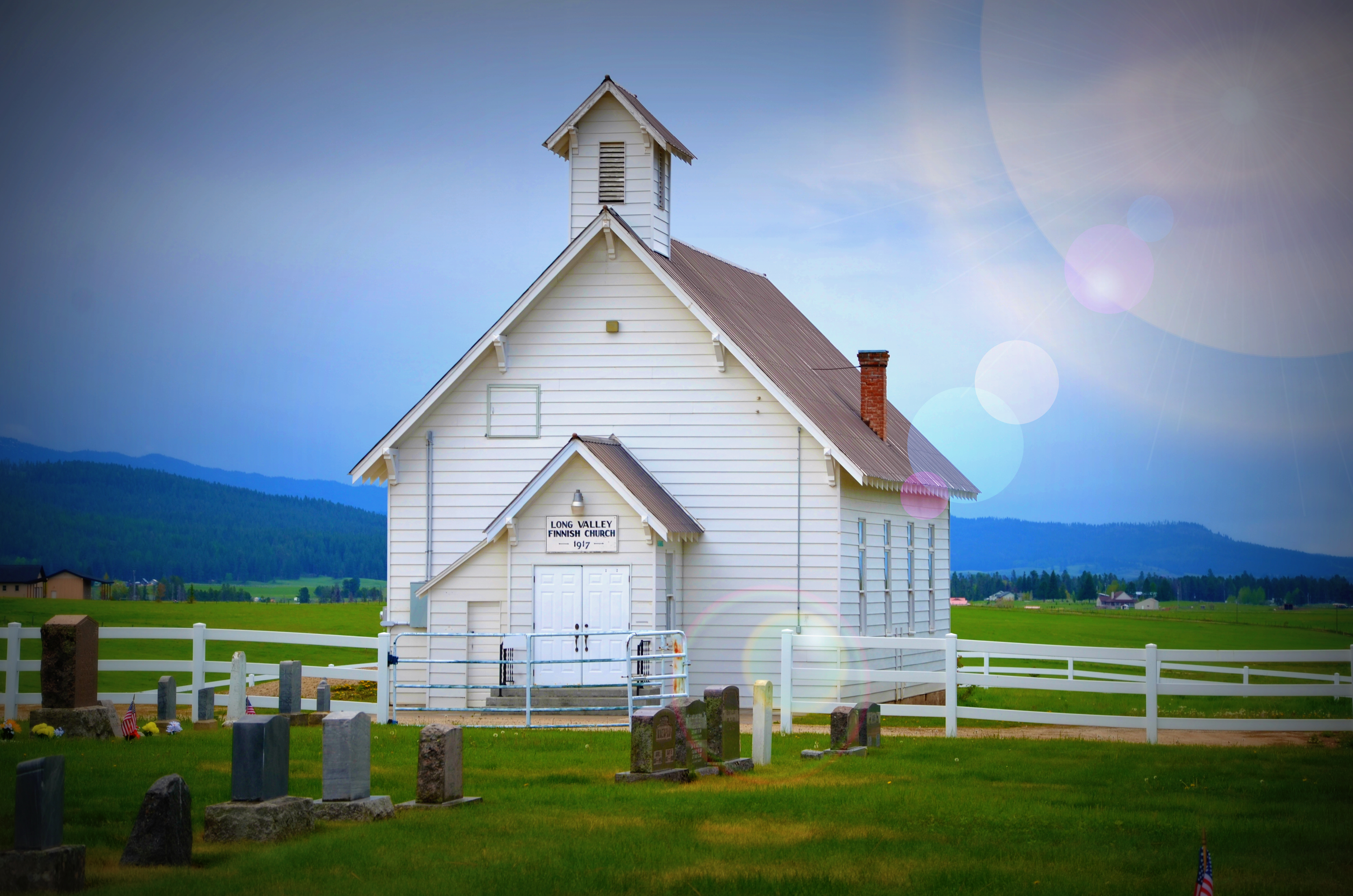

- Location within Idaho Location within the United States
- Location: Southeast of Lake Fork, Valley County, Idaho
- Coordinates: 44°49′05″N 116°02′46″W
- Area: 208 acres (84 ha)
- Built: 1917
- Built by: Ruuska, John; Heikkila, John
- NRHP reference No.: 80001336
- Added to NRHP: May 27, 1980

Long Valley Finnish Church is a church constructed to meet the needs of Finnish immigrants to the United States, located in Valley County, Idaho. The church was added to the National Register or Historic Places on May 27, 1980.

The church was maintained by the Finnish Ladies' Aid Society. It is considered "the best-preserved building of the Long Valley Finnish community".
