= Harrison Boulevard Historic District =

Historic building in Boise, Idaho

- U.S. National Register of Historic Places
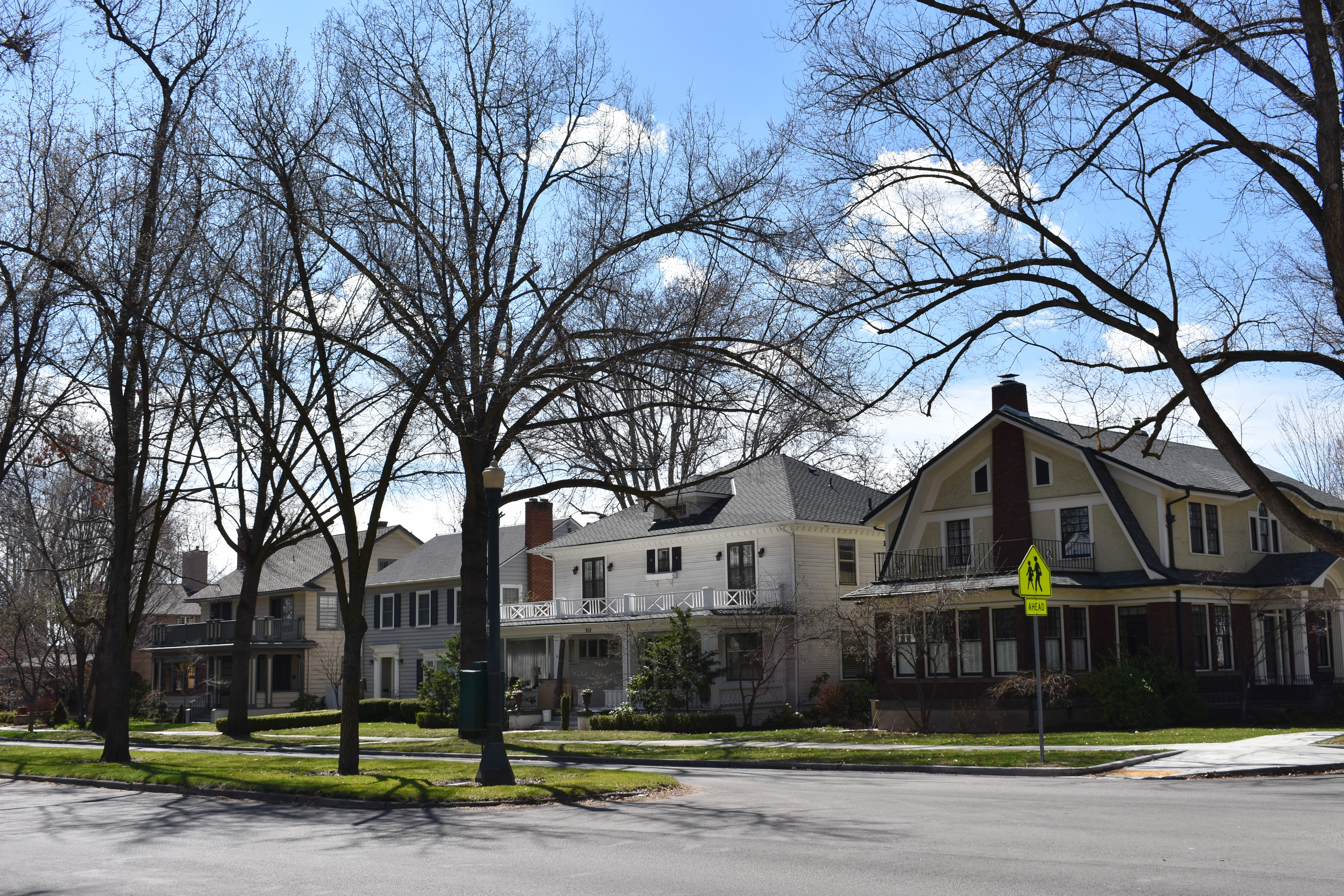
- Harrison Boulevard Historic District in 2019

- Location within Idaho Location within the United States
- Location: An irregular pattern along Harrison Blvd., Boise, Idaho
- Coordinates: 43.630207°N 116.208278°W
- Area: 119 acres (48 ha)
- Architect: Multiple
- Architectural style: Bungalow/craftsman, Tudor Revival, Queen Anne
- NRHP reference No.: 80001286
- Added to NRHP: February 29, 1980

The Harrison Boulevard Historic District in Boise, Idaho, includes 427 residences, an elementary school, and a church. The district is centered on Harrison Boulevard, a wide, tree lined thoroughfare with a grassy median separating north and south traffic. Harrison Boulevard extends approximately one mile from its southern beginning at West Hays Street to its northern boundary at Hill Road. The east boundary extends to Washington School at 15th and Ridenbaugh Streets, and it includes three residential properties at 15th Street, but the district narrows around Harrison Boulevard as it proceeds north. The west boundary extends as far as 20th Street at the south end of the district, and it narrows to Harrison Boulevard as the district proceeds north.

Many architectural styles are represented in the district, including Bungalow, Queen Anne, Tudor Revival, Colonial Revival, and Classical Revival. Many residences were designed by Boise's prominent architectural firms, including Tourtellotte & Co., Tourtellotte & Hummel, Wayland & Fennell, and Nisbet & Paradice. The district was added to the National Register of Historic Places in 1980.

== History ==
President Harrison visited Boise on May 8, 1891, less than one year after Idaho had become the 43rd state. Harrison was well received, and Harrison Boulevard was named in his honor. At 100 feet, the boulevard was at the time the widest street in Boise. The newly platted Brumback Addition included the south end of Harrison Boulevard, and homesites were advertised on the boulevard during President Harrison's visit. By 1895 the Lemp Addition and the Locust Grove Addition, north of the Brumback Addition, also included Harrison Boulevard.

In 1916 Harrison Boulevard was paved and landscaped, and street lights were installed. Signs marking the Harrison Boulevard Historic District were installed in 2001 in memory of Ambrose Baltes, a former resident of the district and homeless program volunteer.

== Harrison Boulevard contributing resources ==
A continuation sheet attached to the nomination form contains information about each of the contributing resources in the district. The list below includes the street address, year of construction, original owner, architect, and architectural style of each property if data was available. Most properties on the list include the year of construction, and some include the original owner and the architectural style. Few include the architect.

=== North of West Hays Street ===
- 820 Harrison Boulevard (1911)

=== North of West Resseguie Street ===
- 900 Harrison Boulevard (1905); Emulous Wallace House
- 901 Harrison Boulevard (1912); R.S. Shaw House
- 906 Harrison Boulevard; Colonial Revival
- 907 Harrison Boulevard (1911); C.A. Carter House; Wayland & Fennell; Colonial Revival
- 911 Harrison Boulevard (1940); Colonial Revival
- 912 Harrison Boulevard (1940); Harry Morrison House
- 915 Harrison Boulevard (1910); T.K. Little House; Nisbet & Paradice
- 919 Harrison Boulevard (1921); S.E. Brookover House

=== North of West Ada Street ===
- 1002 Harrison Boulevard (1925); Walter Dufresne House; Tudor Revival
- 1005 Harrison Boulevard (1910)
- 1009 Harrison Boulevard (1909)
- 1017 Harrison Boulevard (1909); Francis Sanders House
- 1020 Harrison Boulevard (1936); J.C. Jordan House
- 1021 Harrison Boulevard (1909); Manford Coffin House; Tourtellotte & Co.; Bungalow

=== North of West Sherman Street ===
- 1103 Harrison Boulevard (1930); Ross Cady House
- 1106 Harrison Boulevard (1929); Arthur Stevens House; Bungalow
- 1107 Harrison Boulevard (1937); J.D. Orr House
- 1111 Harrison Boulevard (1938); R.E. Newhouse House; Tudor Revival
- 1112 Harrison Boulevard (1923); Harry J. Bingham House; Colonial Revival
- 1118 Harrison Boulevard (1936); J.A. Terteling House; Tudor Revival

=== North of West Alturas Street ===
- 1200 Harrison Boulevard (1929); Tudor Revival
- 1201 Harrison Boulevard (1913); J.H. Oakes House; Nisbet & Paradice; Georgian Revival
- 1206 Harrison Boulevard (1932); Pearl Hastings House
- 1210 Harrison Boulevard (1936)
- 1213 Harrison Boulevard (1920); Al Kennard House; Colonial Revival
- 1220 Harrison Boulevard (1936); Colonial Revival
- 1221 Harrison Boulevard (1938); R.S. Smith House; Colonial Revival

=== North of West Eastman Street ===
- 1304 Harrison Boulevard (1901); John Myer House; Queen Anne
- 1305 Harrison Boulevard (1905); Eugene Looney House; Tourtellotte & Co.; Queen Anne
- 1311 Harrison Boulevard (1936)
- 1312 Harrison Boulevard (1923)
- 1315 Harrison Boulevard (1939); Colonial Revival
- 1316 Harrison Boulevard (1912); Colonial Revival

=== North of West Brumback Street ===
- 1402 Harrison Boulevard (1937); Tudor Revival
- 1403 Harrison Boulevard (1908); Arthur Golden House; Colonial Revival
- 1406 Harrison Boulevard (1938); Tudor Revival
- 1409 Harrison Boulevard (1908); Harry C. Wyman House; Tourtellotte & Co.
- 1410 Harrison Boulevard (1911); Bungalow
- 1415 Harrison Boulevard (1919); Colonial Revival
- 1420 Harrison Boulevard (1910); S.J. Loupe House

=== North of West Ridenbaugh Street ===
- 1500 Harrison Boulevard (1940); Colonial Revival
- 1505 Harrison Boulevard (1911); G.W. Bond House; Tourtellotte & Hummel; Mission Revival
- 1509 Harrison Boulevard (1910)
- 1510 Harrison Boulevard (1941); Colonial Revival
- 1516 Harrison Boulevard (1930); Tudor Revival
- 1519 Harrison Boulevard (1907); Robert Nourse House

=== North of West Lemp Street ===
- 1601 Harrison Boulevard (1920); J.H. Richards House; Wayland & Fennell; Colonial Revival
- 1602 Harrison Boulevard (1910); W.E. Leitner House
- 1605 Harrison Boulevard (1937)
- 1609 Harrison Boulevard (1908); Henry Compton House
- 1610 Harrison Boulevard (1937); Tudor Revival
- 1615 Harrison Boulevard (1925)
- 1619 Harrison Boulevard (1928); Colonial Revival
- 1620 Harrison Boulevard (1910); Mary Nutt House

=== North of West Heron Street ===
- 1700 Harrison Boulevard (1937); Tudor Revival
- 1701 Harrison Boulevard (1923); Ira E. High House; Bungalow
- 1704 Harrison Boulevard (1915)
- 1706 Harrison Boulevard (1905); John P. Anderson House
- 1707 Harrison Boulevard (1920); H.K. Fritchman House (second); Bungalow
- 1711 Harrison Boulevard (1936); Tudor Revival
- 1714 Harrison Boulevard (1905)
- 1717 Harrison Boulevard (1936); Claude R. High House; Moderne
- 1718 Harrison Boulevard (1908)

=== North of West Hazel Street ===
- 1800 Harrison Boulevard (1921); Bungalow
- 1801 Harrison Boulevard (1940); A. Anderson House; Hans Hulbe; Colonial Revival
- 1806 Harrison Boulevard (1922)
- 1812 Harrison Boulevard (1919); E.C. Daughlin House; Bungalow
- 1820 Harrison Boulevard (1921); Bungalow

=== North of West Bella Street ===
- 1901 Harrison Boulevard (1920); Bungalow
- 1903 Harrison Boulevard (1916); Bungalow
- 1907 Harrison Boulevard (1916); Bungalow
- 1911 Harrison Boulevard (1909); Bungalow
- 1910 Harrison Boulevard (1922); Bungalow
- 1912 Harrison Boulevard (1911); Bungalow
- 1915 Harrison Boulevard (1923)
- 1919 Harrison Boulevard (1923); J.R. Courtney House; Bungalow
- 1920 Harrison Boulevard (1930); Tudor Revival

=== North of West Irene Street ===
- 2001 Harrison Boulevard (1921); B.J. Bradley House; Bungalow
- 2004 Harrison Boulevard (1910)
- 2009 Harrison Boulevard (1910); Omer W. Allen House; Bungalow
- 2010 Harrison Boulevard (1941); Colonial Revival
- 2014 Harrison Boulevard (1914); Charles Spinner House
- 2016 Harrison Boulevard (1910); Bungalow
- 2017 Harrison Boulevard (1930)
- 2020 Harrison Boulevard (1926)
- 2021 Harrison Boulevard (1906)
- 2025 Harrison Boulevard (1940); Tudor Revival
- 2026 Harrison Boulevard (1910); Queen Anne
- 2030 Harrison Boulevard (1912)
- 2036 Harrison Boulevard (1938)
- 2037 Harrison Boulevard (1937)
- 2040 Harrison Boulevard (1937); Colonial Revival
- 2041 Harrison Boulevard (1937); Colonial Revival

=== North of West Dewey Street ===
- 2101 Harrison Boulevard (1920); Bungalow
- 2106 Harrison Boulevard (1909); Joseph and Mary Rose House
- 2108 Harrison Boulevard (1920); Ezekiel Sweet House; Bungalow
- 2111 Harrison Boulevard (1909); Thomas Hamilton House
- 2114 Harrison Boulevard (1910); Bungalow

=== North of West Dora Street ===
- 2200 Harrison Boulevard (1910); Byron J. Wilson House
- 2201 Harrison Boulevard (1942)
- 2203 Harrison Boulevard (1940); John Cornell House; Tudor Revival
- 2206 Harrison Boulevard (1903); John B. Archibal House

== North 15th Street ==
- 1101 N 15th St (1905)
- 1403 N 15th St (1903); Queen Anne
- 1419 N 15th St (1921); Bungalow
- 1607 N 15th St (1912); Washington School; designed by Boise High School students

== North 16th Street ==
=== North of West Resseguie Street ===
- 900 N 16th St (1905); L.M. Bumpas House; Queen Anne
- 901 N 16th St (1906); Bungalow
- 904 N 16th St (1906)
- 905 N 16th St (1905)
- 909 N 16th St (1908); Calvin Starling House
- 910 N 16th St (1906)
- 914 N 16th St (1904)
- 917 N 16th St (1907); Ella Baxter House; Queen Anne
- 918 N 16th St (1920); Bungalow

=== North of West Ada Street ===
- 1001 N 16th St (1907); C.C. Abernathy House; C.E. Ward; Bungalow
- 1003 N 16th St (1912); Bungalow
- 1004-1006 N 16th St (1921); Leda B. Goux Bungalows
- 1008 N 16th St (1910); Bungalow
- 1011 N 16th St (1905); Queen Anne
- 1014 N 16th St (1906)
- 1015 N 16th St (1906)
- 1019 N 16th St (1908); Glenn Shawhan House

=== North of West Sherman Street ===
- 1101 N 16th St (1920); Bungalow
- 1102 N 16th St (1904); Gardner G. Adams House
- 1107 N 16th St (1912); Guy Stanets House; Bungalow
- 1108 N 16th St (1908); Queen Anne
- 1109 N 16th St (1909); Queen Anne
- 1112 N 16th St (1911)
- 1113 N 16th St (1905); Charles and Maude Bassett House
- 1119 N 16th St (1908); James Wylie House

=== North of West Alturas Street ===
- 1201 N 16th St (1904); Queen Anne
- 1202 N 16th St (1906)
- 1208 N 16th St (1905)
- 1209 N 16th St (1905);Newton Irish House
- 1210 N 16th St (1906); Mary Goff House
- 1211 N 16th St (1910); Albert Redd House
- 1212 N 16th St (1904)
- 1213 N 16th St (1909); Harvey Bostwick House
- 1215 N 16th St (1910)
- 1217 N 16th St (1920); Charles Yerrington House; Bungalow
- 1220 N 16th St (1900)

=== North of West Eastman Street ===
- 1301 N 16th St (1906); Lewis Heaston House; Queen Anne
- 1304 N 16th St (1904); Guy Matthews House; Queen Anne
- 1307 N 16th St (1900); F.C. Smith House; J.W. Smith
- 1310 N 16th St (1904)
- 1314 N 16th St (1903)
- 1315 N 16th St (1908); Queen Anne
- 1318 N 16th St (1898); Lou Harris House
- 1319 N 16th St (1908); George Cole House; Queen Anne

=== North of West Ridenbaugh Street ===
- 1501 N 16th St (1940); Bungalow
- 1509 N 16th St (1927); Bungalow
- 1511 N 16th St (1924); Bungalow
- 1515 N 16th St (1923); Bungalow
- 1519 N 16th St (1904); Queen Anne

=== North of West Lemp Street ===
- 1601 N 16th St (1902)
- 1604 N 16th St (1910); James and Lizzie Hanley House
- 1607 N 16th St (1901)
- 1609 N 16th St (1911)
- 1612 N 16th St (1912); Harriet Lane House
- 1613 N 16th St (1922); Bungalow
- 1615 N 16th St (1903)
- 1619 N 16th St (1904); John F. Green House
- 1620 N 16th St (1940); Colonial Revival

=== North of West Heron Street ===
- 1702 N 16th St (1905); Augusta Wootan House
- 1703 N 16th St (1903); William O'Neill House; Queen Anne
- 1706 N 16th St (1905); Etta and David Kimsey House
- 1710 N 16th St (1907); Earl Holmstead House
- 1711 N 16th St (1907)
- 1713 N 16th St (1905); Thomas Moore House
- 1715 N 16th St (1905); L.C. Heffner House
- 1717 N 16th St (1907); Joseph Monroe House

== North 17th Street ==
=== North of West Franklin Street ===
- 709-711 N 17th St (1940); Moderne
- 713-715 N 17th St (1935); Moderne

=== North of West Resseguie Street ===
- 801 N 17th St (1909)
- 805 N 17th St (1911); Bungalow
- 806 N 17th St (1921); Bungalow
- 807 N 17th St (1910); Bungalow
- 808 N 17th St (1920); Bungalow
- 809 N 17th St (1910); Bungalow
- 812 N 17th St (1920); Bungalow
- 819 N 17th St (1912); Bungalow
- 820 N 17th St; Bungalow

=== North of West Ada Street ===
- 901 N 17th St (1909); Queen Anne
- 906 N 17th St (1930); John Perrault House; Tudor Revival
- 907 N 17th St; Bungalow, Queen Anne
- 909 N 17th St (1921); Colonial Revival
- 910 N 17th St (1910); Bungalow
- 912 N 17th St (1913); Bungalow
- 915 N 17th St (1921); Colonial Revival
- 919 N 17th St (1908)

=== North of West Sherman Street ===
- 1001 N 17th St (1914); Bungalow
- 1004 N 17th St (1911)
- 1006 N 17th St (1920); Bungalow
- 1010 N 17th St (1910)
- 1011 N 17th St (1907)
- 1015 N 17th St (1910)
- 1019 N 17th St (1912)
- 1020 N 17th St (1922); Colonial Revival

=== North of West Alturas Street ===
- 1101 N 17th St (1922); Colonial Revival, Bungalow
- 1102 N 17th St (1923)
- 1110 N 17th St (1910)
- 1111 N 17th St (1910)
- 1115 N 17th St (1911); Bungalow
- 1118 N 17th St (1908); Winfield and Lillian Hyde House
- 1121 N 17th St (1932); Tudor Revival

=== North of West Eastman Street ===
- 1201 N 17th St (1923); Bungalow
- 1205 N 17th St (1915)
- 1209 N 17th St (1901)
- 1210 N 17th St (1938); Colonial Revival
- 1213 N 17th St (1905); Queen Anne
- 1218 N 17th St (1938); Colonial Revival
- 1219 N 17th St (1901)

=== North of West Brumback Street ===
- 1301 N 17th St (1909); Bungalow
- 1302 N 17th St (1935); Tudor Revival
- 1305 N 17th St (1916); Bungalow
- 1309 N 17th St (1926); Bungalow
- 1312 N 17th St (1922); Bungalow
- 1313 N 17th St (1928)
- 1317 N 17th St (1908); Walter Hulick House; Bungalow

=== North of West Irene Street ===
- 1901 N 17th St (1898) 1700 Irene St; Frank Foster House
- 1908 N 17th St (1906); Jesse Dressler House
- 1912 N 17th St (1906)
- 1913 N 17th St (1920); Bungalow
- 1915 N 17th St (1907); Queen Anne
- 1918 N 17th St (1908)
- 1919 N 17th St (1904); Queen Anne
- 1920 N 17th St (1905); Queen Anne
- 1923 N 17th St (1911); Bungalow
- 1924 N 17th St (1911); Bungalow
- 1930 N 17th St (1906)
- 1934 N 17th St (1910)
- 1938 N 17th St (1908); Benjamin Frank Orr House
- 1944 N 17th St (1908); Queen Anne

=== North of West Dewey Street ===
- 2001 N 17th St (1899); George Vaughn House; John E. Tourtellotte; Queen Anne
- 2002 N 17th St (1905)

== North 18th Street ==
=== North of West Washington Street ===
- 617 N 18th St (1913); W.B. Hartman House
- 621 N 18th St (1912)
- 703 N 18th St (1909)
- 704 N 18th St (1912)

=== North of West Resseguie Street ===
- 801 N 18th St (1921); Bungalow
- 802 N 18th St (1922); F.H. Roseboom House; Bungalow
- 805 N 18th St (1921); Bungalow
- 808 N 18th St (1931); Tudor Revival
- 809 N 18th St (1910); Queen Anne
- 814 N 18th St (1933); Tudor Revival
- 815 N 18th St (1926); Tudor Revival
- 818 N 18th St (1907)
- 819 N 18th St (1928); Tudor Revival

=== North of West Ada Street ===
- 901 N 18th St (1921); Bungalow
- 902 N 18th St (1935); Tudor Revival
- 905 N 18th St (1910); George Schaff House
- 906 N 18th St (1929); Tudor Revival
- 908 N 18th St (1914); Bungalow
- 911 N 18th St (1910); Queen Anne
- 912 N 18th St (1934)
- 915 N 18th St (1914); Bungalow
- 918 N 18th St (1935)
- 919 N 18th St (1933); Tudor Revival

=== North of West Sherman Street ===
- 1001 N 18th St (1910); John Leonard House
- 1002 N 18th St (1921); Colonial Revival
- 1004 N 18th St (1929); Mission Revival
- 1007 N 18th St (1910); Bungalow
- 1012 N 18th St (1912); Dorothy Hook House; Colonial Revival
- 1013 N 18th St (1919); Bungalow
- 1014 N 18th St (1938); Tudor Revival
- 1015 N 18th St (1937)
- 1018 N 18th St (1940); Clayne Robinson House; Tudor Revival
- 1019 N 18th St (1938); Colonial Revival

=== North of West Alturas Street ===
- 1101 N 18th St (1935); Tudor Revival
- 1102 N 18th St (1914); G.W. Bond House (second); Tourtellotte & Hummel; Bungalow
- 1104 N 18th St (1914)
- 1107 N 18th St (1913); Bungalow
- 1111 N 18th St (1940)
- 1115 N 18th St (1910)
- 1116 N 18th St (1928); Tudor Revival

=== North of West Eastman Street ===
- 1202 N 18th St (1905)
- 1212 N 18th St (1905)
- 1215 N 18th St (1911); W.E. Leitner House (second)
- 1220 N 18th St (1907)
- 1226 N 18th St (1902)

=== North of West Brumback Street ===
- 1301 N 18th St (1910); Bungalow
- 1302 N 18th St (1911); A.E. Ihrig House; Bungalow
- 1304 N 18th St (1911); A.E. Ihrig House (second); Bungalow
- 1307 N 18th St (1916); A.E. Woodman House (second); Bungalow
- 1308 N 18th St (1911); A.E. Ihrig House (third); Bungalow
- 1314 N 18th St (1911)

=== North of West Ridenbaugh Street ===
- 1401 N 18th St (1906); Queen Anne

=== North of West Irene Street ===
- 1902 N 18th St (1910); Queen Anne

== North 19th Street ==
=== North of West Resseguie Street ===
- 701 N 19th St (1929)
- 706 N 19th St (1919); Bungalow
- 707 N 19th St (1910)
- 710 N 19th St (1911); Tudor Revival
- 711 N 19th St (1911); Colonial Revival
- 714 N 19th St (1921); Bungalow
- 720 N 19th St (1911); Queen Anne

=== North of West Ada Street ===
- 801 N 19th St (1910)
- 802 N 19th St (1922)
- 805 N 19th St (1910); Bungalow
- 806 N 19th St (1922); Bungalow
- 809 N 19th St (1923); William Antrim House
- 810 N 19th St (1922); Colonial Revival
- 816 N 19th St (1908); J.R. Compton House
- 817 N 19th St (1911)
- 819 N 19th St (1911)

=== North of West Sherman Street ===
- 901 N 19th St (1911); David Newman House; Bungalow
- 902 N 19th St (1911); Silas Burnham House; Bungalow
- 905 N 19th St (1911); Bungalow
- 906 N 19th St (1910); Bungalow
- 909 N 19th St (1910); Bungalow
- 910 N 19th St (1911)
- 915 N 19th St (1911)
- 916 N 19th St (1910); Bungalow
- 918 N 19th St (1922); Bungalow
- 919 N 19th St (1922); Bungalow

=== North of West Alturas Street ===
- 1001 N 19th St (1911)
- 1002 N 19th St (1911); Hezekiah and Lucy Saunders House (second)
- 1003 N 19th St (1914)
- 1004 N 19th St (1910)
- 1009 N 19th St (1928)
- 1012 N 19th St (1911); Bungalow
- 1015 N 19th St (1910); Alfred Lee House
- 1016 N 19th St (1908)

=== North of West Eastman Street ===
- 1101 N 19th St (1923); Bungalow
- 1102 N 19th St (1911)
- 1106 N 19th St (1910); A.H. Bain House; Bungalow
- 1107 N 19th St (1912); J.P. Taylor House; Bungalow
- 1110 N 19th St (1910); Bungalow
- 1115 N 19th St (1911); Bungalow
- 1116 N 19th St (1941); Lyle Ferney House
- 1117 N 19th St (1910); Willie A. White House

== North 20th Street ==
=== North of West Washington Street ===
- 603 N 20th St (1908); Lars S. Honstead House
- 616 N 20th St (1911); A.E. Woodman House

=== North of West Resseguie Street ===
- 702 N 20th St; Tudor Revival
- 706 N 20th St (1911)
- 708 N 20th St (1927); Bungalow
- 709 N 20th St (1921); Bungalow
- 710 N 20th St (1911); C.K. Denman House
- 711 N 20th St (1913); Bungalow
- 713 N 20th St (1922); Robert Mowbray Davidson House; Colonial Revival
- 718 N 20th St (1909); Robert Bears House

=== North of West Ada Street ===
- 801 N 20th St (1908); Henry and Mary Vernon House

== Named streets ==
=== West Hays Street ===
- 1609 W Hays St (1921)
- 1615 W Hays St (1909)
- 1619 W Hays St (1909)
- 1621 W Hays St (1904); William Hitson House; Queen Anne

=== West Resseguie Street ===
- 1605 W Resseguie St (1910); James Slick House
- 1607 W Resseguie St (1910)
- 1609 W Resseguie St (1911)
- 1611 W Resseguie St (1907); Queen Anne
- 1660-1666 W Resseguie St (1935); Colonial Revival
- 1701 W Resseguie St (1911)
- 1705 W Resseguie St (1912)
- 1707 W Resseguie St (1912)
- 1711 W Resseguie St (1911); Bungalow
- 1713 W Resseguie St (1909); Hezekiah Saunders House
- 1715 W Resseguie St (1912); Bungalow
- 1811 W Resseguie St (1910); Bungalow
- 1817 W Resseguie St (1911); Colonial Revival
- 1818 W Resseguie St (1940)
- 1820 W Resseguie St (1935); Colonial Revival
- 1903 W Resseguie St (1928); Tudor Revival
- 1915 W Resseguie St (1914)

=== West Ada Street ===
- 1670 W Ada St (1915); Colonial Revival
- 1715 W Ada St (1907)

=== West Sherman Street ===
- 1529 W Sherman St (1921); R.S. Coolbaugh House

=== West Alturas Street ===
- 1521 W Alturas St (1911)
- 1661 W Alturas St (1921)

=== West Eastman Street ===
- 1661 W Eastman St (1916); Bungalow
- 1665 W Eastman St (1921)
- 1717 W Eastman St (1901)
- 1723 W Eastman St (1911); Former United Presbyterian Church
- 1803 W Eastman St (1904); Andrew McQuaid House; Bungalow
- 1804 W Eastman St (1900); John and Carrie Pilmer House; Queen Anne
- 1817 W Eastman St (1898); Francis Leonard House

=== West Brumback Street ===
- 1817 W Brumback St (1903); Harmon Cox House
- 1901 W Brumback St (1921); Otis Hon House

=== West Ridenbaugh Street ===
- 1702 W Ridenbaugh St (1900); J.M. Campbell House
- 1711 W Ridenbaugh St (1911); Bungalow
- 1724 W Ridenbaugh St (1904); Queen Anne
- 1801 W Ridenbaugh St (1904); Thomas Bennett House
- 1810 W Ridenbaugh St (1938)

=== West Lemp Street ===
- 1611 W Lemp St (1913)

=== West Hazel Street ===
- 1511 W Hazel St (1910)

=== West Irene Street ===
- 1662 W Irene St (1938)
- 1710 W Irene St (1920)

=== West Dewey Street ===
- 1661 W Dewey St (1928)
