= East Side Downtown Historic District =

- U.S. National Register of Historic Places
- Location within Idaho Location within the United States
- Location: Roughly including the 200 and 300 blocks E. Center St., 100 block N. Second Ave. and 100 block S. Second Ave., Pocatello, Idaho
- Coordinates: 42°51′43″N 112°26′46″W
- Area: 6 acres (2.4 ha)
- Built: c. 1900
- Built by: Alex Mathers
- Architect: Frank H. Paradice, Jr.
- Architectural style: Late 19th and 20th Century Revivals, Art Deco
- NRHP reference No.: 94001361
- Added to NRHP: November 25, 1994

The East Side Downtown Historic District in Pocatello, Idaho is a historic district which was listed on the National Register of Historic Places in 1994.

The district includes 12 contributing building in a 6 acres (2.4 ha) area roughly including the 200 and 300 blocks of E. Center St., the 100 block of N. Second Ave. and the 100 block of S. Second Ave. in Pocatello.

Two buildings in the district were designed by architect Frank H. Paradice, Jr.; a couple were built by local builder Alex Mathers. (Note: This builder may or may not be the Alexander Mathers who was a builder of Montgomery Court (1908) in Denver, Colorado).)

Per a daughter, architect Francis Charles Woods designed "the Auditorium" in Pocatello, Idaho. Assuming that's correct, it would be the Auditorium Opera House, either the 1893 reconstruction of an earlier opera house that was damaged in a fire, but which itself was destroyed in a fire in October 1899, or the 1900 new construction in brick. This, like some other Woods works, was Italianate in style, although the front was later modified in Art Deco style, but the Italianate styling can still be seen in its side wall along the alley running beside it. After another fire in 1939, the building was converted into a furniture store, which remained in 1994.

Contributing buildings in the district include:

- Auditorium Opera House (1900, 1939), 237 E. Center. Art Deco features added in 1939.
- McNichols Building (1915), 251 E. Center. Three-story brick commercial block with a red and buff brick veneer in two contrasting colors, Renaissance Revival in style including in a protruding, modillioned cornice.
- Elkhorn Creamery (c.1914-15), 128 South 2nd. Two-story commercial block.
- Elkhorn Creamery office (1907–15), 128 South 2nd. One-story brick commercial building which served as an office and restaurant.
- Wise Frame-Sam's Loan-Just Desserts (c.1915-21), 309/321/327 E. Center. One-story brick commercial building, with three storefronts, home of Ford's drugstore through the 1930s and 1940s.
- George Cacavas grocery (c.1907-15, c.1921-23), 331/333/335 E. Center. One-story brick building with a pressed-brick veneer painted white, with a decorative cornice
- City Building and Shop (1915-21 for office building; c.1940 for auto repair shop), 210 E. Center. One-story brick office building with a terra cotta facade along First St. and Center St. elevations, with Art Deco styling. Plus one-story brick and concrete auto shop with a stepped parapet wall.
