= Nisbet & Paradice =

Idaho architectural firm

Nisbet & Paradice was an architectural firm in Idaho. It was a partnership of architects Benjamin Morgan Nisbet and Frank H. Paradice, Jr. formed in 1909. The partnership lasted five years. They dissolved it in 1915, and Nisbet moved to Twin Falls, Idaho to establish an individual practice, and Paradice did likewise in Pocatello, Idaho. A number of their works are recognized by listings on the National Register of Historic Places (NRHP).

== Nisbet ==
Benjamin Nisbet (born December 19, 1873) was born and grew up in Pittsburgh, Pennsylvania. He apprenticed with an architectural firm there before enrolling at the University of Pennsylvania's school of architecture. In 1897 he won a school award there, and graduated in 1898. He was married in 1903 and soon moved to Nampa, Idaho, where he opened a practice. He began partnering in Boise, Idaho with another architect (J. Flood Parker) during March to August 2004, then joined an established Boise firm.

He worked for J.E. Tourtellotte and Company in Boise from 1903 to 1909.

After partnering with Paradice during 1909 to 1915, he moved to Twin Falls, where he designed the City Hall, the high school, the Methodist church, and the IOOF building. (Note: Perhaps the Buhl City Hall and the Buhl IOOF Building, in Buhl rather than Twin Falls, were the buildings intended to be referenced. These two were designed by Paradice. It is not immediately verifiable that he might have designed another city hall and another IOOF building in Twin Falls.)

== Paradice ==
Frank H. Paradice, Jr., was born May 4, 1879, in Ontario, Canada. His family moved to Denver by 1880, and he eventually graduated from high school there. He studied architecture the Armour Institute of Technology in Chicago. Back in Denver, Paradice apprenticed with a firm and at the same time worked for the Denver & Rio Grande Railroad, where he designed depots and other structures in Colorado and New Mexico. He opened his own architectural office in Denver, and moved to Boise in 1907.

After partnering with Nisbet during 1909 to 1915, Paradice moved to Pocatello, where he designed "several Sullivanesque commercial buildings". He designed the high school, the Franklin Building, the Fargo Building, the Bannock Hotel, the Kasiska and Central Buildings and many other buildings. At least two of his works there are contributing buildings in historic districts listed on the National Register.

In Pocatello Paradice belonged to many social and service organizations. During 1921 to 1953 was the only Idaho member of the American Institute of Architects. "Paradice was still handling projects when he died in February of 1953."

== Works ==
Works by the firm or either partner include (with attribution):

- Sterry Hall (1909–10), College of Idaho campus, Caldwell, ID (Nesbit & Paradice), NRHP-listed
- Two works in NRHP-listed Harrison Boulevard Historic District, in Boise:

- T.K. Little House (1910), 915 Harrison Boulevard (Nisbet & Paradice)
- J.H. Oakes House (1913), 1201 Harrison Boulevard, Georgian Revival (Nisbet & Paradice)

- Anduiza Hotel (1914), 619 Grove St., Boise, ID (Paradice, Frank H. and Nisbet, Benjamin), NRHP-listed

- Grand Hotel (1914), 1070 Grove Street, Boise, non-contributing due to later renovations as Safari Motor Inn, in NRHP-listed Lower Main Street Commercial Historic District (Nisbet & Paradice)

- Payette Lakes Club (1914–15), (Nisbet & Paradice)
- First Baptist Church of Emmett (1915), 1st St., Emmett, ID (Nisbet & Paradice), NRHP-listed
- Kimberly High School (1916), 141 Center St. W., Kimberly, ID (Nesbit, B. Morgan), NRHP-listed
- Brady Memorial Chapel (1918–22), Mountain View Cemetery, Pocatello, ID (Paradice, Frank, Jr.), NRHP-listed
- Buhl City Hall (1919), Broadway and Elm St., Buhl, ID (Nisbet, Morgan B.), NRHP-listed
- Buhl IOOF Building (1919-1920), 1014-16 Main St., Buhl, ID (Nisbet, B. Morgan), NRHP-listed
- Pocatello Federal Building, Arthur Ave. and Lewis St., Pocatello, ID (Paradice, Frank H.), NRHP-listed
- One or more works in NRHP-listed East Side Downtown Historic District, roughly including the 200 and 300 blocks E. Center St., 100 block N. Second Ave. and 100 block S. Second Ave., Pocatello, ID (Paradice, Frank H., Jr.)
- One or more works in NRHP-listed Pocatello Historic District, roughly bounded by RR tracks, W. Fremont, W. Bonneville and Garfield Sts., Pocatello, ID (Paradice, Frank H.)
- One or more works in NRHP-listed Pocatello Warehouse Historic District, roughly bounded by S. 2nd Ave., E. Halliday, E. Sutter, and the OSL RR tracks, Pocatello, ID (Paradice, Frank H., Jr.)
- One or more works in NRHP-listed Pocatello Westside Residential Historic District, roughly bounded by N. Arthur Ave., W. Fremont St., N. Grant Ave., and W. Young St., Pocatello, ID (Paradice, Frank, Jr.)
