= Herman Ojala Homestead =

- U.S. National Register of Historic Places
- Location within Idaho
- Nearest city: Lake Fork, Idaho
- Coordinates: 44°51′58″N 116°04′48″W
- Area: 2.5 acres (1.0 ha)
- Built: c. 1902
- Architectural style: Finnish Log Structure
- MPS: Long Valley Finnish Structures TR
- NRHP reference No.: 82000370
- Added to NRHP: November 17, 1982

The Herman Ojala Homestead, in Valley County, Idaho, near Lake Fork, Idaho, was built around 1902. It was listed on the National Register of Historic Places in 1982.

Its construction date is figured as five years before the 1907 receipt of homestead patent by Mr. Ojala; homesteading requires five years of possession of the land. It was deemed significant as an early example of the Finnish style of log construction.

It is a one-room homestead cabin, about 12 by 20 feet (3.7 m × 6.1 m) in dimension, built of hewn logs in Finnish style. It is unusual for having a three-foot extension, along the lengthwise south-facing wall, which provides shelter for firewood. In 1980 the boards nailed over its gable ends were falling down, and the shake-shingled roof was only partly covered.

It is located about 2.5 miles northeast of Lake Fork, Idaho, off Pearson Road. It is inaccessible by road and at least partly hidden by aspen trees, factors which may have contributed to its survival in good condition.
