= Anduiza Hotel =

- U.S. National Register of Historic Places
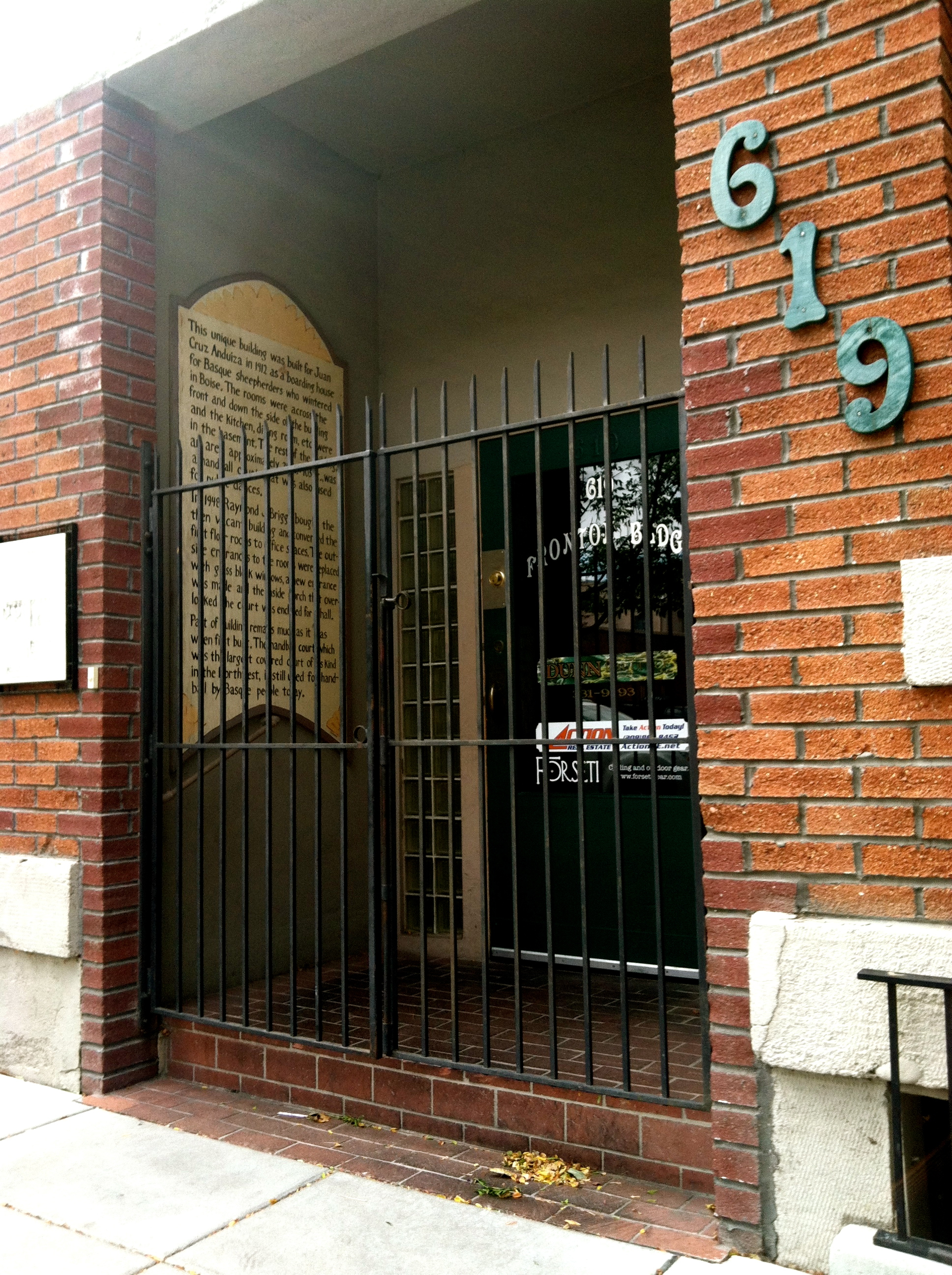
- Front entrance of the building, with informational sign documenting the building's history.

- Location within Idaho Location within the United States
- Location: 619 Grove St., Boise, Idaho, United States
- Coordinates: 43°36′51″N 116°12′06″W
- Built: 1914
- Architect: Benjamin Nisbet and Frank H. Paradice
- NRHP reference No.: 03000064
- Added to NRHP: February 25, 2003

The Anduiza Hotel is a historic hotel located in Boise, Idaho, United States. The hotel was constructed in 1914 to serve as a boarding house for Basque sheepherders. It was listed on the National Register of Historic Places on February 25, 2003.

It was built by and/or for Basque immigrant Juan "Jack" Anduiza.

It contains a fronton for playing Basque pelota.

It was designed by architects Nisbet & Paradice.

Nisbet and Paradice designed the "Anduiza Hotel, built as a Basque boarding house with its fronton (pelota court). The Anduiza is on the National Register of Historic Places and still serves as a centre of Basque cultural heritage in Boise."
