= Matt Ruatsale Homestead =

Historic house in Idaho, United States

- U.S. National Register of Historic Places
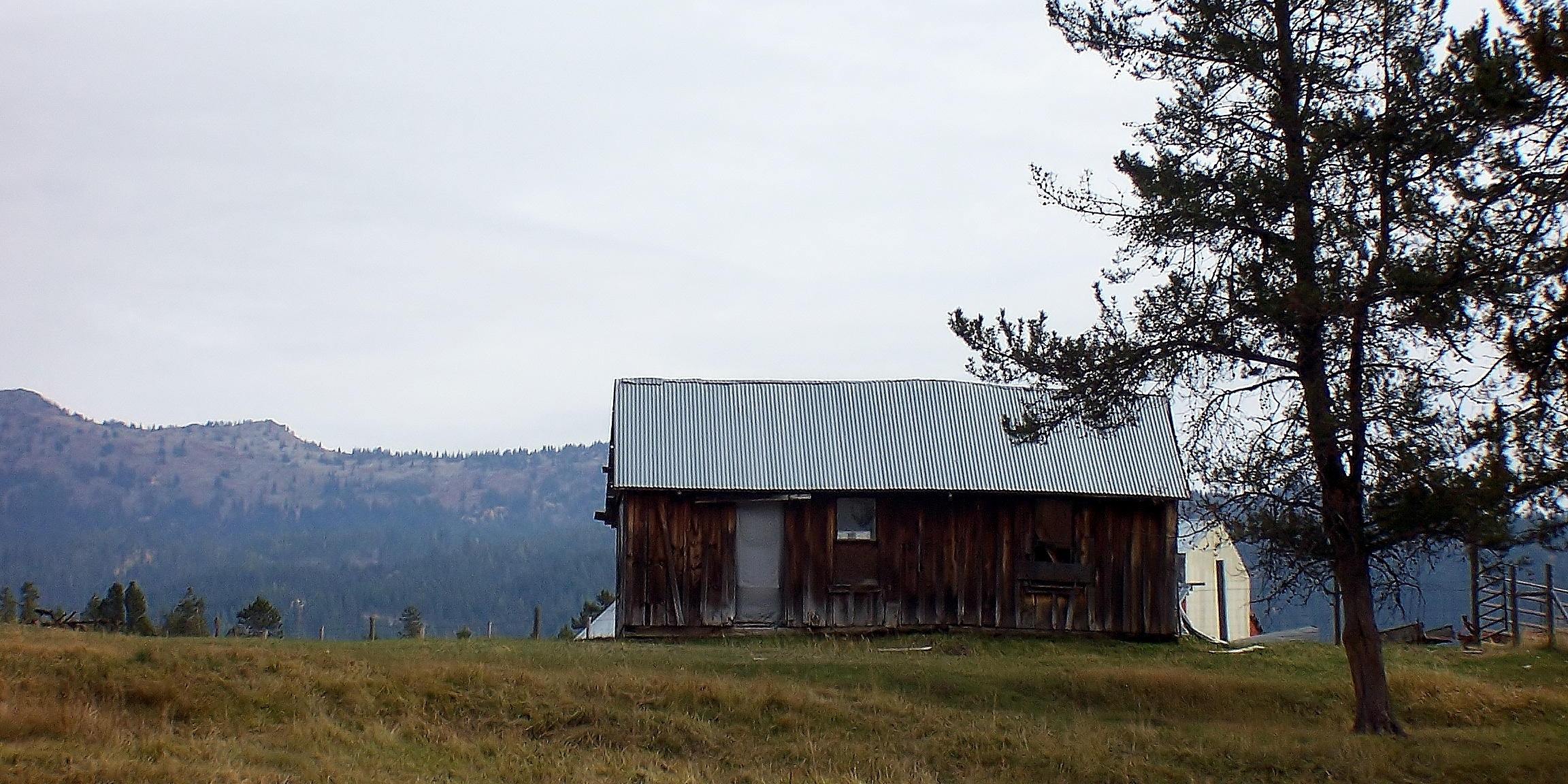

- Location within Idaho Location within the United States
- Location: North of Kantola Lane, vicinity of Lake Fork, Idaho
- Coordinates: 44°49′42″N 116°2′44″W
- Area: 2.5 acres (1.0 ha)
- Built: c.1915
- Architectural style: Finnish Log Structure
- MPS: Long Valley Finnish Structures TR
- NRHP reference No.: 82000371
- Added to NRHP: November 17, 1982

The Matt Ruatsale Homestead in Valley County, Idaho, in the vicinity of Lake Fork, Idaho, was built in c.1915. The house was moved to its present location from the Ruatsale homestead site sometime prior to it being listed on the National Register of Historic Places in 1982.

It is a log house approximately 21 by 30 feet (6.4 m × 9.1 m) in plan, built of hand-hewn logs. It is partitioned into four rooms. The east–west partition protrudes through exterior walls in traditional Finnish style.
