= Krassel Ranger Station =

- U.S. National Register of Historic Places
- Location within Idaho Location within the United States
- Nearest city: Yellow Pine, Idaho
- Coordinates: 44°58′14″N 115°43′53″W
- Area: 6.2 acres (2.5 ha)
- Built: 1937
- Built by: Civilian Conservation Corps
- Architect: Architects of the United States Forest Service
- Architectural style: Late 19th and Early 20th Century American Movements
- NRHP reference No.: 92000688
- Added to NRHP: November 19, 1992

The Krassel Ranger Station, near Yellow Pine, Idaho, was built in 1937. It was listed on the National Register of Historic Places in 1992. The listing included four contributing buildings, a contributing structure, and a contributing site on 6.2 acres (2.5 ha).

It is located along the South Fork of the Salmon River, 11 miles west of Yellow Pine in the Payette National Forest.

Some of the work was designed by Architects of the United States Forest Service; some of the building was done by the Civilian Conservation Corps.

It includes:

- the Ranger's Residence, Building No. 1113 (1937), built with CCC labor
- Building No. 1316 (1938), a warehouse/garage
- a suspension footbridge (1941) across to the southern bank of the South Fork of the Salmon River.
- Building No. 1204 (moved to site in 1954), formerly the warehouse and garage at the Poverty Flat Guard Station, moved here to be used as an office. Converted into a residence in 1990.
- Building No. 1115, created by combination of:
  - CCC-constructed building (originally built in 1933) also moved from the Poverty Flat Guard Station in 1954, and
  - another structure (built in 1934) later moved from the Lake Fork Guard Station.
