= Elo School =

- U.S. National Register of Historic Places
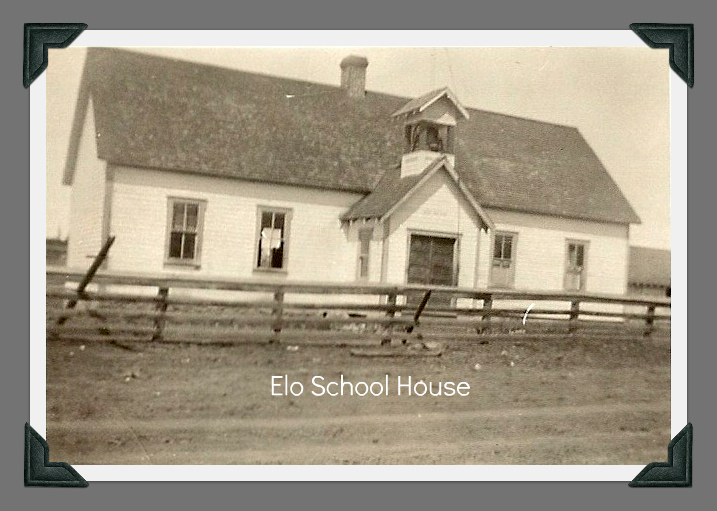

- Location within Idaho Location within the United States
- Location: Southeast of State Highway 55 on Farm to Market Rd., near McCall in Valley County, Idaho
- Coordinates: 44°53′10″N 116°3′34″W
- Area: 1 acre (0.40 ha)
- Built: 1906
- Built by: Pekkala, Abram
- MPS: Long Valley Finnish Structures TR
- NRHP reference No.: 82002515
- Added to NRHP: July 26, 1982

The Elo School is a historic school built in 1906 and expanded in 1915. It is a 24 by 64 feet (7.3 m × 19.5 m) building with an enclosed porch and a bell tower. It was named for Reverend John William Eloheimo, a Finnish Evangelical minister, and his daughter Eva Eloheimo was one of its first teachers. The original 1906 structure was built for $612 by Abram Pekkala; the expansion was by Finnish carpenters John Heikkila and John Ruuska. The school was listed on the National Register of Historic Places in 1982.

The NRHP listing includes a 25 by 25 feet (7.6 m × 7.6 m) teacher's cottage located behind the school.

It is located southeast of State Highway 55 on Farm to Market Rd., in or near McCall, in Valley County, Idaho.
