= Cabin Creek Ranch =

- U.S. National Register of Historic Places
- Location within Idaho Location within the United States
- Nearest city: Black Butte, Idaho
- Coordinates: 45°08′14″N 114°56′01″W
- Area: 620 acres (250 ha)
- Built: 1894
- NRHP reference No.: 90000890
- Added to NRHP: June 27, 1990

Cabin Creek Ranch, on Cabin Creek at its confluence with Big Creek in the Payette National Forest, near Black Butte, Idaho, was listed on the National Register of Historic Places in 1990. The listing included two contributing buildings, two contributing structures, and 16 contributing sites on 620 acres (250 ha).

- Year of construction: 1894
- Historic function: Domestic; Agriculture/subsistence
- Historic subfunction: Single Dwelling; Agricultural Outbuildings; Agricultural Fields; Animal Facility; Secondary Structure
- Criteria: event, information potential
