= Nickolai Wargelin Homestead =

- Wargelin, Nickolai, Homestead
- U.S. National Register of Historic Places
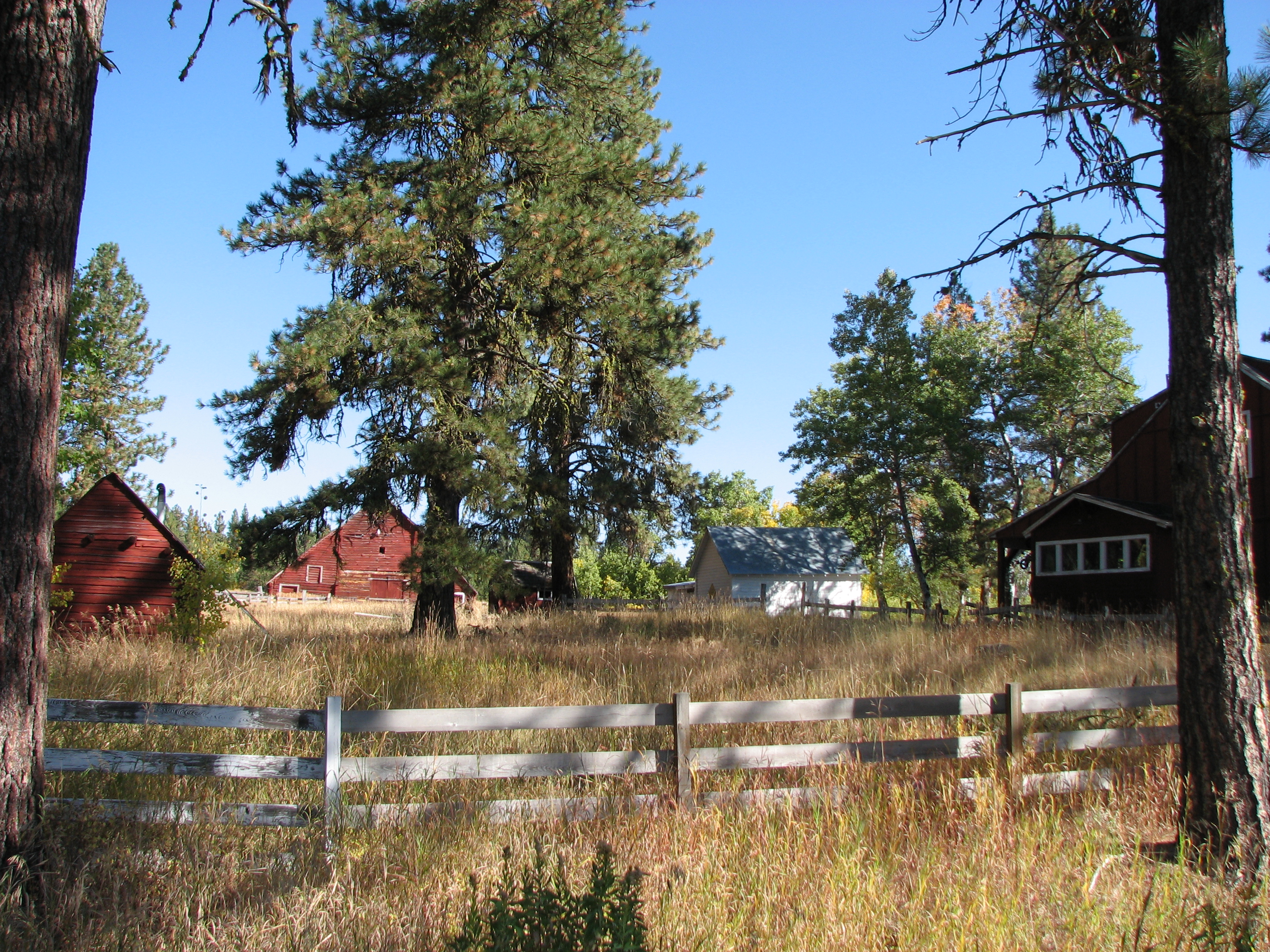

- Location within Idaho Location within the United States
- Nearest city: McCall, Idaho
- Coordinates: 44°53′03″N 116°04′05″W
- Area: 2.5 acres (1.0 ha)
- Built: 1918
- Architectural style: Finnish Log Structures
- MPS: Long Valley Finnish Structures TR
- NRHP reference No.: 82000372
- Added to NRHP: November 17, 1982

The Nickolai Wargelin Homestead, in Valley County, Idaho southeast of McCall, Idaho, was built in 1918. It was listed on the National Register of Historic Places in 1982. The listing included four contributing buildings on 2.5 acres (1.0 ha).

Architecture: Finnish Log Structures Historic function: Domestic; Agriculture/subsistence Historic subfunction: Single Dwelling; Agricultural Outbuildings; Secondary Structure Criteria: architecture/engineering

== See also ==
- Wargelin-Warila Homestead, NRHP-listed in Montana
