= Buhl City Hall =

- U.S. National Register of Historic Places
- Location within Idaho Location within the United States
- Location: Broadway and Elm St., Buhl, Idaho
- Coordinates: 42°36′0″N 114°45′38″W
- Area: less than one acre
- Built: 1919
- Architect: Morgan B. Nisbet
- Architectural style: Mission/Spanish Revival
- NRHP reference No.: 78001099
- Added to NRHP: February 8, 1978

The Buhl City Hall, at Broadway and Elm St. in Buhl, Idaho was listed on the National Register of Historic Places in 1978.

It was designed by architect B. Morgan Nisbet and was built in 1919. It is a two-story Mission- or Spanish Revival-style stucco building. It has an outset center bay with a Baroque false gable.

It was deemed to be "the best example of the [Mission] style used for governmental functions" among Mission style buildings in Twin Falls County where the style was popular during 1910 to 1928.

The building was demolished on January 26, 1993.
