= Payette Lakes Club =

- U.S. National Register of Historic Places
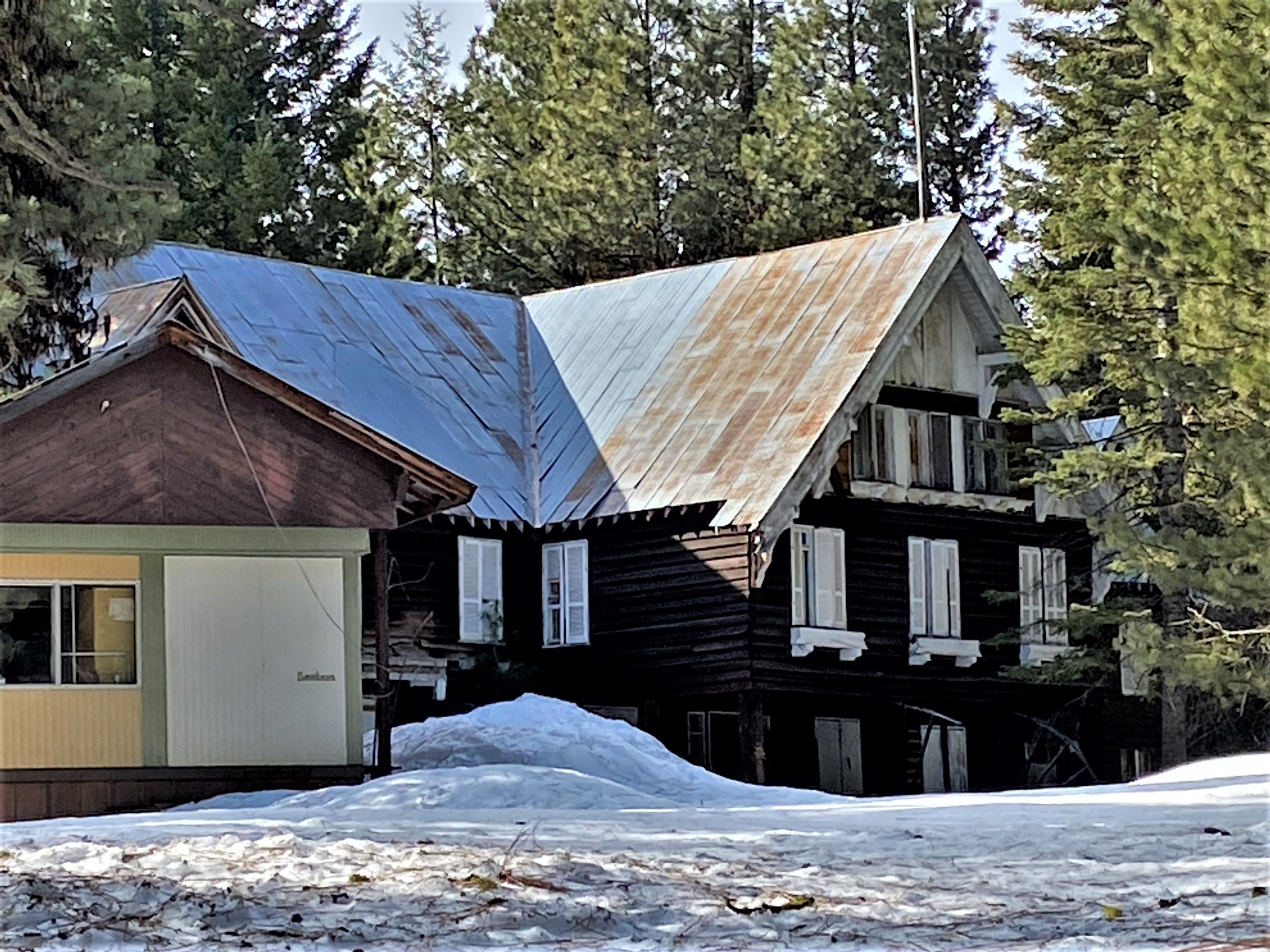

- Location within Idaho Location within the United States
- Location: 1585 Warren Wagon Rd., McCall, Idaho
- Coordinates: 44°55′26″N 116°07′40″W
- Area: less than one acre
- Built: 1914-15
- Built by: Fenton G. Cottingham
- Architect: Frank H. Paradice and Benjamin Morgan Nisbet
- Architectural style: Rustic, Swiss Chalet Style
- NRHP reference No.: 100000905
- Added to NRHP: April 24, 2017

The Payette Lakes Club, at 1585 Warren Wagon Rd. in McCall, Idaho, was listed on the National Register of Historic Places in 2017.

It is a large (100 by 70 feet (30 m × 21 m) in plan) three-story building which was built during 1914-15 and was "instrumental in the early development of recreation in the McCall area, as well as central Idaho, and is an excellent representative of Rustic style architecture."

It was modelled after the Adirondack Architecture of the Great Camps in the Adirondacks of New York State. It was designed to be an inn, a Chautauqua center, and a casino. It was surrounded by small cabin lots.

It is rustic Swiss chalet style.

It was designed by Boise architects Frank H. Paradice and Benjamin Morgan Nisbet, and it was built by contractor Fenton G. Cottingham with lumber supplied by the Hoff and Brown Lumber Company. Cottingham was a skilled carpenter and did much of the interior finish work, too, including building much of the inn's furniture.

"A focal point of the promotion was the clubhouse and casino, which at an estimated cost of $20,000, was quite luxurious—almost $500,000 in today’s value. Construction began in August of 1914. The contract for the preliminary work, including excavation, stone foundations, and exterior work was given to contractor Fenton G. Cottingham of Nampa. The Hoff and Brown Lumber Company supplied the lumber at $14 per thousand feet. Fenton was a skilled carpenter

Paradice and Nisbet

It overlooks Big Payette Lake, from its western side, in town of McCall.

"The building is situated on a small knoll above the lake, in what is currently a heavily wooded area. The primary façade faces the lake to the east. The Payette Lakes Club was built between 1914 and 1915 by a non-profit social club of the same name organized by Judge Samuel H. Hays of Boise and marketed by H. W. Arnold & Company. The building was designed in the Rustic style by noted Boise architects Nisbet and Paradice. The building is a three-story, side-gabled wood-framed building with a T-shaped plan and three prominent front-facing gables. The foundation is poured concrete. Decorative features include the jerkinheads at the gable ends, the large decorative wooden gable brackets, window boxes and shutters, porches and verandas with low balustrades, and the numerous gabled dormers. A popular vacation spot, the inn was instrumental in the early development of recreation in the McCall area, as well as central Idaho, and is an excellent representative of Rustic style architecture. Although the Club suffers from some condition issues, it retains sufficient integrity to convey its significance under Criteria A and C."

"The Inn is a large, three-story wood-framed building of post and beam construction, which is set on a concrete foundation (Figure 1). Designed in the Rustic style, with elements of Swiss Chalet Revival, the main section measures 33 ft. by 100 ft. wide and is supported by a series of several large 18-in. hand-planed timbers. The prominent front porch is 34 ft. x 16 ft. and is recessed beneath the large front-facing cross-gable, supported by eight hand-planed square timbers. A low balustrade encircles the porch. A small ell in the southwest corner where the kitchen is located measures 22 ft. by 24 ft. and would have been reached by a separate entrance. The siding is clapboard and is heavily deteriorated in sections. The north and south gable ends are jerkinheads, with six large wooden gable brackets, while the front-facing cross-gable also has six large brackets. The gable ends were originally clad in board and batten siding. The steeply pitched gabled roof is currently clad in corrugated metal, although it originally had wood shingles. The widely overhanging eaves exhibit exposed rafter tails. Several gabled dormers pierce the roof; originally, there were eight on the west façade, only three of which remain. Currently, seven dormers remain on the east elevation."
