= Lake Fork, Idaho =

Unincorporated community in the state of Idaho, United States

- Unincorporated community
- Location within Idaho Location within the United States
- Coordinates: 44°49′58″N 116°05′05″W
- Country: United States
- State: Idaho
- County: Valley
- Elevation: 4,974 ft (1,516 m)
- Time zone: UTC-7 (Mountain (MST))
  - Summer (DST): UTC-6 (MDT)
- ZIP code: 83635
- Area codes: 208, 986
- GNIS feature ID: 396759

Lake Fork is an unincorporated community in Valley County, Idaho, United States. Lake Fork is located on Idaho State Highway 55 5.5 miles (8.9 km) south of McCall.
