= Sun Blood Stories =

American experimental rock/pop trio

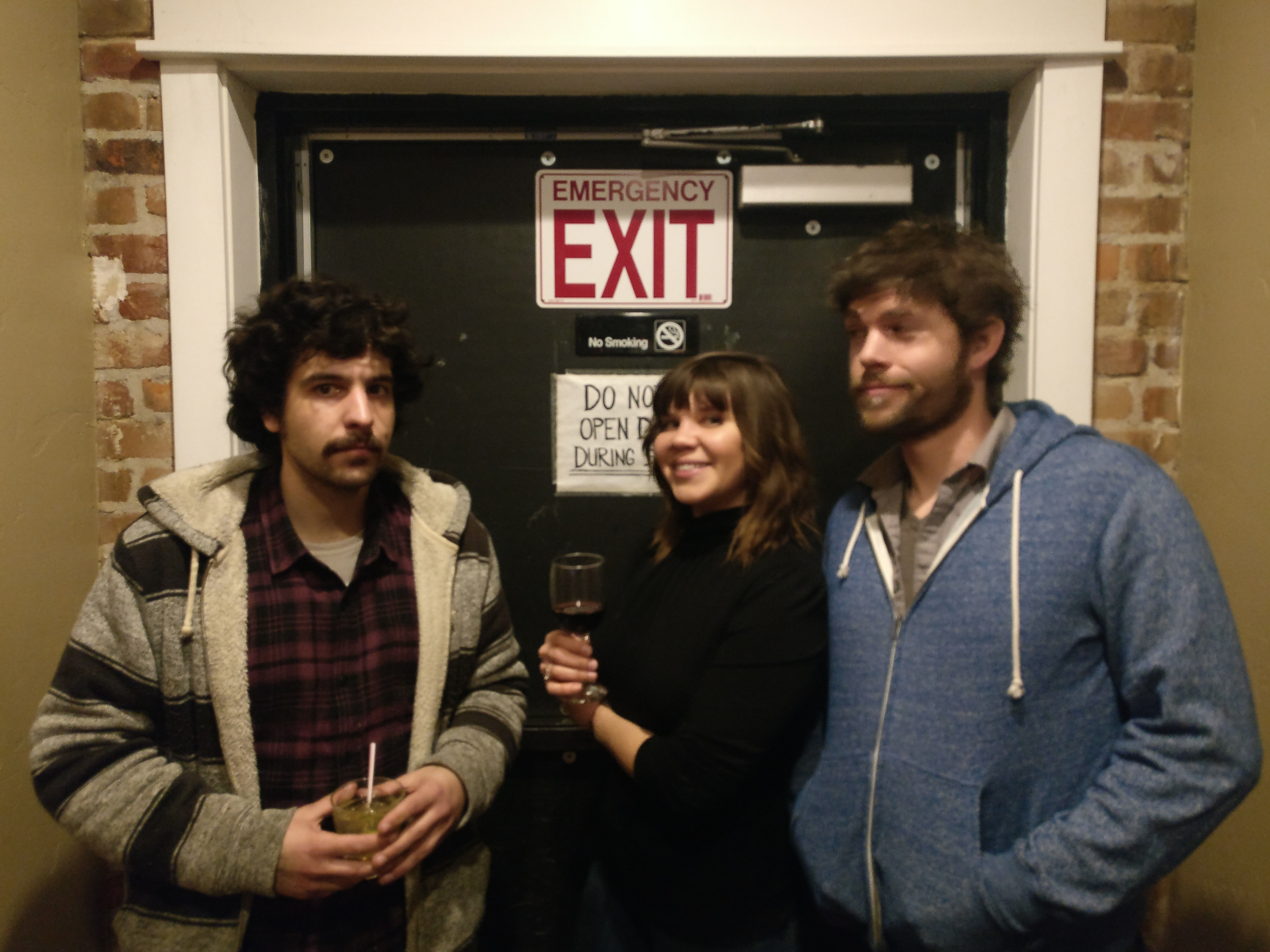

Background information
- Origin: Boise, Idaho, U.S.
- Genres: Psychedelic, experimental, blues, funk
- Members: Jon Fust; Ben Kirby; Amber Pollard
- Website: sunbloodstories.com

Sun Blood Stories is an American experimental band from Boise, Idaho, founded in 2011. Named after the color of Boise's skies during summer forest fires, their mesmerizing live sound has been likened to modern-day opera.

The group performs regularly at the annual Treefort Music Fest, Boise's signature event.

Previously signed to Banana Stand Media, the band now releases material independently.

== Discography ==
Albums

- The Electric Years (2007)
- Early Recording of Early Songs of Sun Blood Stories (2011)
- Live From the Banana Stand (2015)
- Samhain Variation: In Flight Air Raid Wake Up I Don't Know (2015)
- Twilight Midnight Morning (2015)
- It Runs Around the Room with Us (2017)
- Haunt Yourself (2019)
