= Treefort Music Fest =

Annual music festival in Boise, Idaho, United States

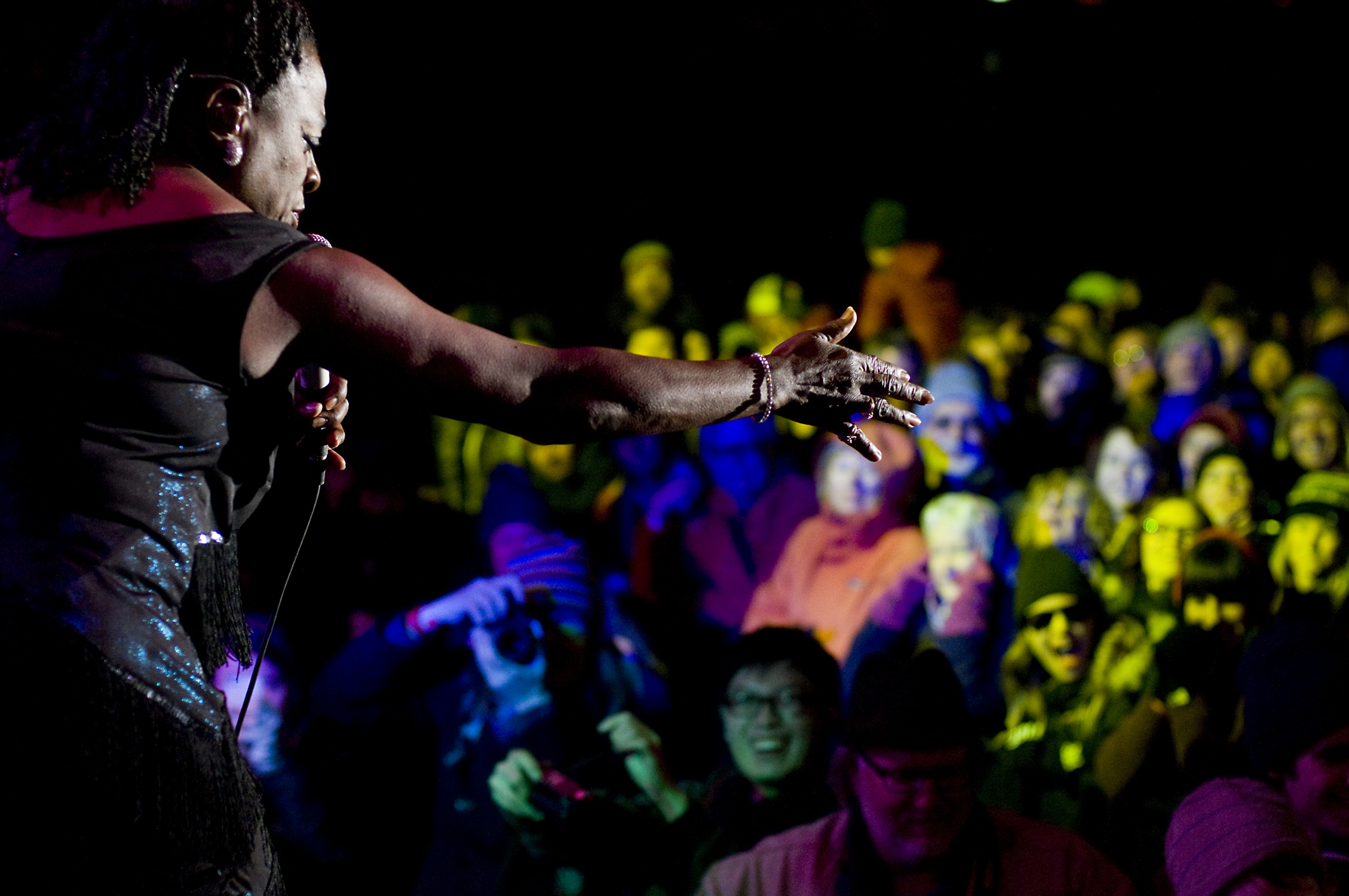
Sharon Jones and the Dap Kings performing at Treefort, 2013

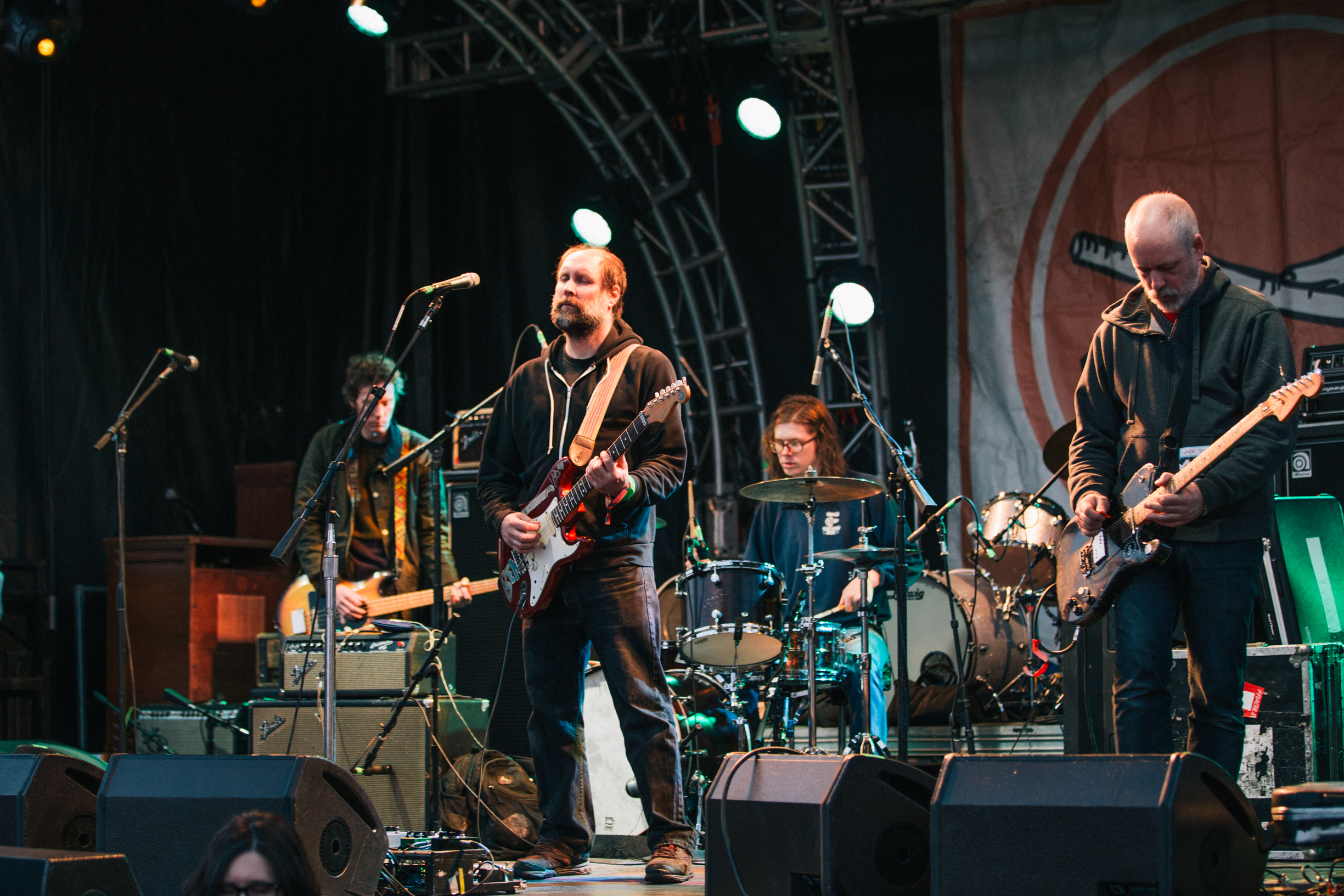
Built To Spill performing at "Main Stage," 2016

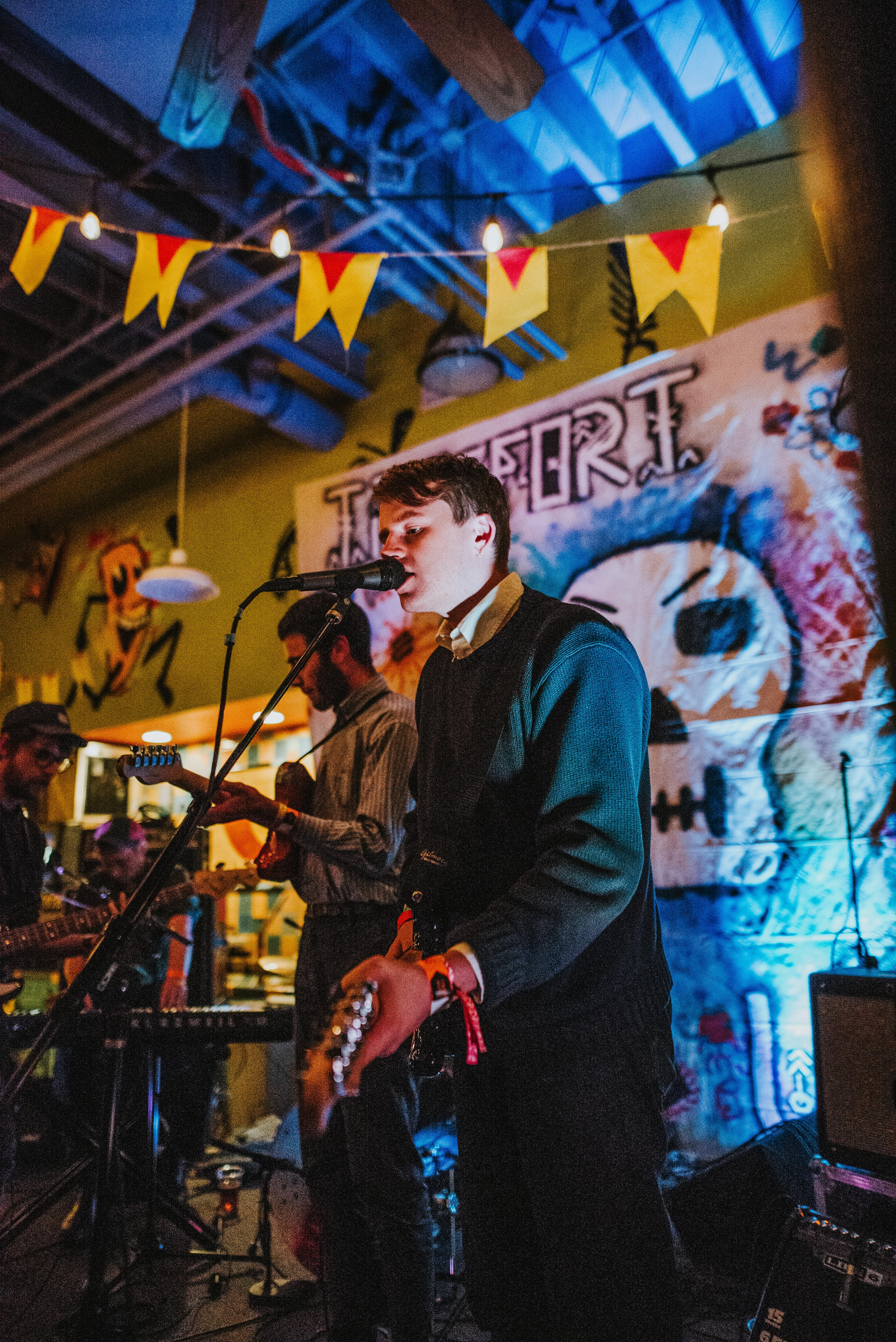
Curtis Wakeling performing with The Ocean Party, 2017

Treefort Music Fest is a five-day indie rock festival held at several venues throughout downtown Boise, Idaho in late March. The inaugural festival took place from March 20–23, 2012, featuring Built to Spill, The Joy Formidable, Poliça, and other acts. Treefort has been called "the west’s best SXSW alternative" and "Boise's preeminent artistic, cultural, and musical happening."

The festival is organized by Duck Club, a local concert promoter. Concerts primarily take place at Julia Davis Park with events hosted at over 20 other venues across downtown Boise.

Several smaller spin-off festivals take place during Treefort. Alefort serves beers from local, regional, and international breweries, Artfort showcases performance art and interactive exhibits, and Hackfort hosts technology companies and conferences. Other festivals include Dragfort, Filmfort, Foodfort, Storyfort, Skatefort, Podfort, Kidfort and Music Talks.

== History ==
Although the idea of a multi-day, multi-venue music festival has been bruited since the mid-'80s, Treefort itself had its roots in tragedy when producer Lori Shandro's husband died in a private plane crash in 2009. The head of an independent health insurance agency, Shandro took up interests divergent from her married life, and eventually formed The Duck Club, which brings musical acts to Boise throughout the year and now produces the Treefort Music Fest. Logistically, Treefort was inspired in part by the touring schedules of bands headed home to the Northwest from SXSW in Austin, Texas (some of which had been hosted by the Visual Arts Collective at a post-SXSW mini fest in Garden City, Idaho the previous year), as well as late March being the beginning of spring break for many Idaho schools. A week before the festival itself, the Boise-based bands TEENS, Hillfolk Noir, Le Fleur, The Brett Netson Band, Finn Riggins, Youth Lagoon, and Built to Spill had themselves played at SXSW. Producer Lori Shandro reflected on Treefort's genesis a year later at a Scenius town hall-style meeting on artistic endeavours and economic growth that "There were just a certain number of people who were all in the same place regarding [Treefort]. ... This sort of synergy happened to make the project come together rather easily... With scenius, there's the thought of trying to put the right people in the same place at the same time, and then things will happen. That's really how Treefort happened. Everybody had the same vision that the Boise music scene is ready to develop and be a force on its own two feet." The festival currently has six year-round staff, 100 contract employees during the festival itself, and nearly a thousand volunteers.

== Chronology ==
=== 2012 ===
Off Center Dance Project at a free performance at the Linen Building

Thoroughly grass roots, DIY and free of corporate sponsorship, and with an emphasis on emerging music, the indie-centric inaugural Treefort festival took place on March 22–25, 2012 and featured more than 137 bands from throughout the Northwest and as far afield as New Zealand and Australia, as well as performance art, art installations, and disabled and modern dance, seminars on the music business and social media, and local beers. (Initially the intention had been for a small two-day festival of sixty bands.) There were eight stages extant (including free all-ages venues), and ten hours of music scheduled daily on Treefort's initial Saturday and Sunday; an estimated and unexpected 3,000 people attended each of the last full three days of the festival's inaugural run, and some forty national media outlets provided reportage. Critically, the first day of festival was described as being "full of transcending bands," and overall the festival was characterized as having "the look and feel of a developing SxSW," and "a smashing success," and as well as having "put Boise on the map" in terms of Boise having finally established a music festival due to the high quality of the musicians. The proceeds from Treefort benefit community radio station Radio Boise, KRBX 89.9 FM.

=== 2013 ===
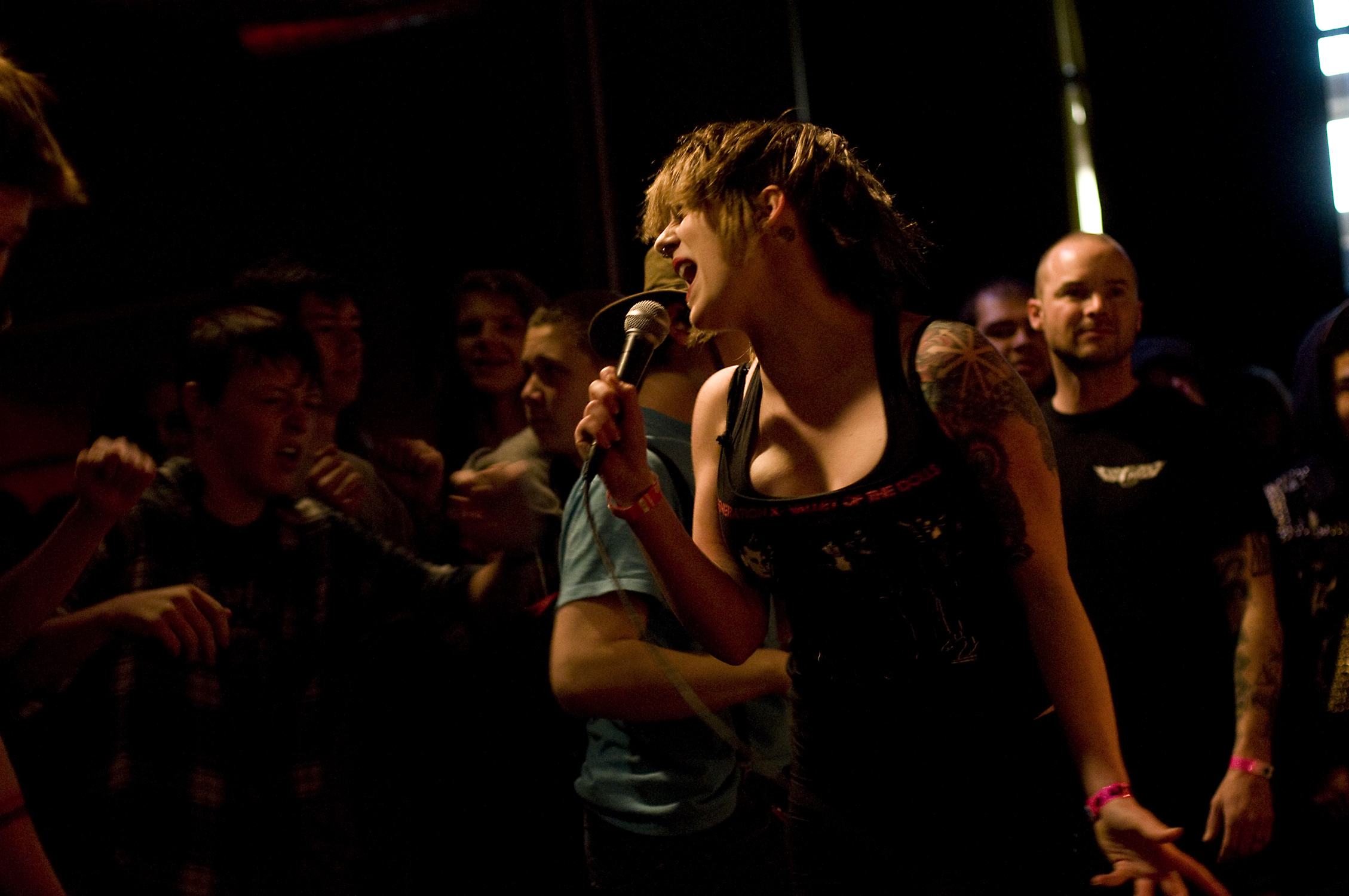
Little Miss and The No Names perform hardcore punk at an all-ages show at the Linen Building in 2013

Months before any bands had even been announced for the Second Annual Treefort Music Fest, scheduled for March 21–24, 2013, the initial batch of early-bird priced wristbands had sold out in October 2012 in 17 minutes. and succeeding ticket sales continued to be faster than those at the same time the previous year. Treefort 2013 eventually signed up more than 250 bands (some of whom are included in Treefort's sound cloud) and featured a lost yarn-bombed 560 lb. monster with a stone head as its mascot. The Coachella Festival has been compared (unfavourably) to the Treefort Music Fest by BuzzFeed.

The second annual Treefort Music Fest aimed at the fence "carefully," featuring a more diverse set of acts, but also more than 100 Idaho bands, one of which, Boise-based Youth Lagoon, was one of Rolling Stone's "Twenty Must-See Acts" at SXSW; it and Foxygen and Unknown Mortal Orchestra, also included in the twenty, performed at both festivals in 2013. The headline act was Sharon Jones and the Dap-Kings, and fifteen bands came from the San Francisco Bay Area. Three times as many passes were sold as in 2012; the festival's own app overloaded on Thursday night, and the opening venue, the Shriner's El Korah Shrine, sold a record amount of alcohol. Festival organizers later estimated that they had come within 100 passes of selling out completely; more than 3,000 4-day passes were sold, and thousands variously journeyed to 13 venues throughout downtown Boise to watch more than 260 bands, with roughly 6,000 at the main stage on Friday alone. Sold-out shows, as with Foxygen on opening night, led to people seeing, and being surprised by, bands they had not planned to see, a phenomenon which festival organizer Eric Gilbert described as a "win-win situation."

Overall the four days of the music festival was acclaimed as turning Boise itself into the sociological third place as different artistic communities converged in a state and city where (the maximum of) six degrees of separation does not exist, and was praised for its high organization and good spirits in showcasing the best independent music North America has to offer and being a safe haven for all walks of life. "Happy Treefort" became a common greeting, and "Treeforting" and "Postfort" also entered the lexicon.

=== 2014 ===
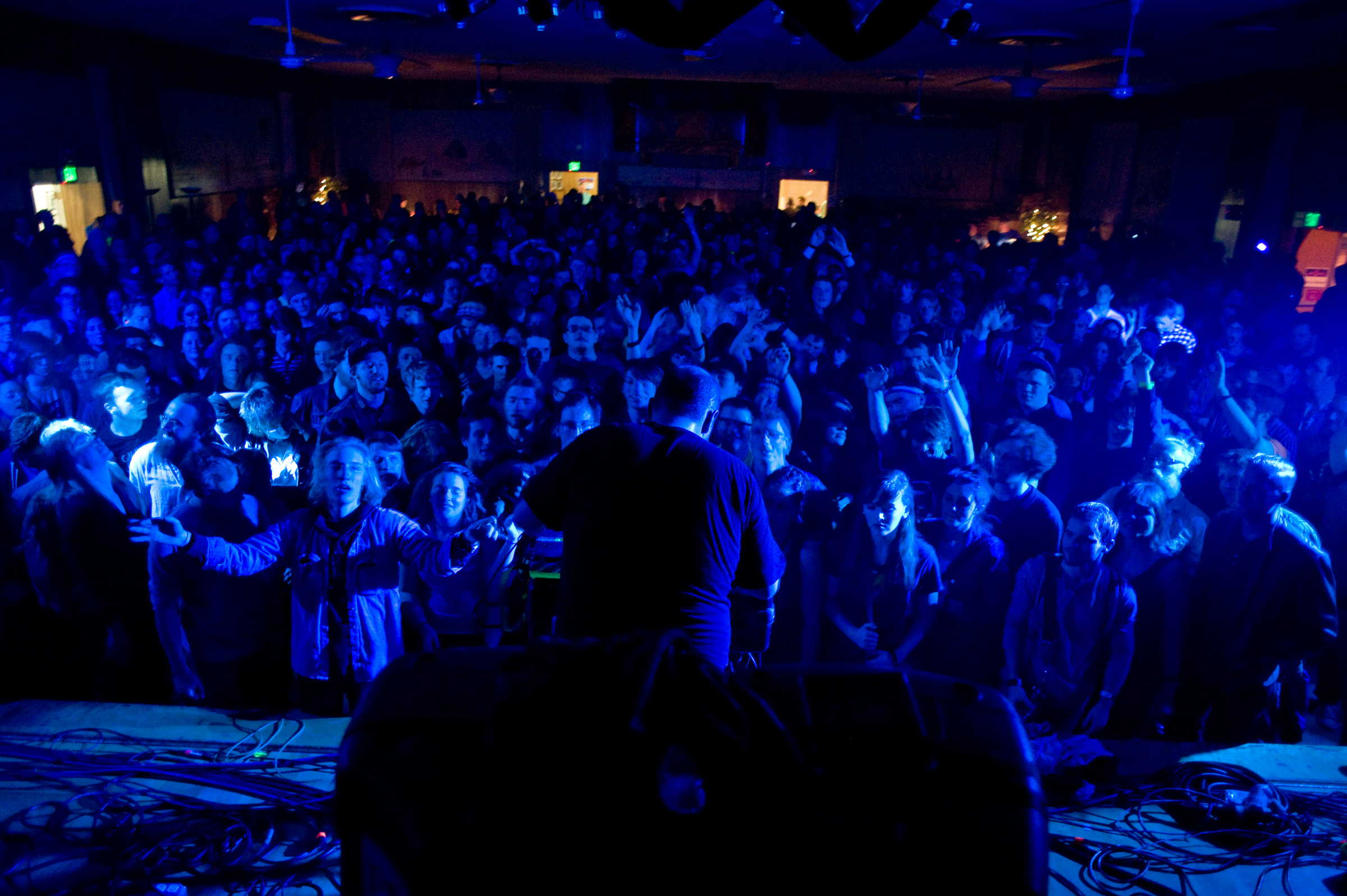
Dan Deacon (2014) performs at El Korah

The third annual festival, in March 2014, endeavored to be more "green"/sustainable and as of February had booked 350 bands (including solo projects and DJs, after rejecting over 1,000 other interested parties) featuring the best of upcoming non-mainstream music from such genres as pop, heavy metal, hip hop, electronica, folk, and classic rock. Furthermore, the festival branched out with a film festival, Filmfort, the tech festival Hackfort (which was lauded by President Barack Obama during his January 21, 2015 visit to Boise), Storyfort, and Yoga Fort, as well as comedy showcases. This synergy marked Treefort as having become "more than a music festival. It is a cultural phenomenon, not only propelling Boise’s music scene forward, but now connecting the city’s cultural communities of literature, technology, film and mind/body health." The music festival too was appraised months later by the Boise Metro Chamber of Commerce CEO and president Bill Conners as having benefits to the city beyond that of tourism. One quarter of those who bought tickets in advance in 2014 were from outside Idaho. "It's become part of Boise's brand," he said. "It's a positive brand that helps attract innovative companies, tourists, conventions and investments, so we hope the festival continues." It has been furthermore been cited as a potential entry in resumes regarding volunteering, and in its second year Hackfort partnered with the Idaho Department of Labor in furtherance of the state's tech industry and digital economy.

The third festival kicked off with a "blast from the past" featuring the reunion of several notable Boise bands; the combined efforts of nearly 400 volunteers (vis-à-vis the nearly 200 for the inaugural festival and the more than 300 for the second) supported bands from the United Kingdom, Germany, Canada, Sweden, Switzerland, and the United States over the course of the festival. Treefort included 140 local bands among the more than 350 during its third year, a testament to the festival's burgeoning creativity. The festival averaged 7,000 people a day, an increase over the 6,000 people a day in 2013, had to order more Over 21 wristbands Saturday afternoon, and was expected to turn a profit for the first time. Although approximately 7,500 attended Saturday night and local bars experienced a boom in business, the Boise Police Department issued no open alcohol container citations or responded to any significant incidents. Overall the third festival was described as having "veered more confidently than ever toward emerging artists in all genres" and having been an extensive community and cultural event where "good attitudes all but fell from the sky."

In August 2014 it was announced that Treefort had yet to make a profit (although it had come close to doing so in 2014), and that the festival was applying to change its business status from that of a limited liability corporation to a certified B corporation whose articles of incorporation and bylaws authorize the corporate board to consider social and other factors besides shareholder interests when making decisions. New co-owners and board members were brought in, and Lori Shandro, who had been subsidizing Treefort to this point, remarked that "I wanted to start something that can last forever... This thing could live on its own without me now." It was also formally announced that the festival would return in 2015, with its website marking a shift to a five-day festival. Treefort is also involved in public art in Boise via Bloomberg Philanthropies and Boise's Department of Arts and History, and in December 2014 was designated Boise's 2015 Cultural Ambassador by Mayor David Bieter and awarded a $25,000 grant for its "... positive impact on the city’s visibility, economy and cultural scene."

=== 2015 ===
Seth Olinsky (2015) conducts a dozen bands as an indie rock orchestra

The fourth annual festival, March 19–24, 2015, booked 430 acts and was supported by some 600 volunteers, approximately 15% of whom went over their required nine hours of volunteer time. Local bands included Magic Sword, Hollow Wood, Thick Business, Transistor Send, Marshall Poole, Calico the Band, and Sun Blood Stories. It also featured Kidfort, Storyfort (a "loose literary happening "like a miniature version of Readings & Conversations," and performance art featuring neo-burlesque amongst other artistic endeavours, "the trippiest part of Treefort," as well as a midnight to 4 a.m. Breakfastfort at El Korah, thus pulling out all the stops. The overlapping of synergistic events was of such complexity that the Boise Weekly published a layout of Venn diagrams, and some of the venues did not typically host musical acts.

Band Dialogue III featured a dozen bands with their respective instrumental kit lined up on both sides of Grove St. conducted by Seth Olinsky holding up placards marked E, F#, B, and so on, riffing and generating shifting walls of sound.

The festival was critically acclaimed for fostering "a genuine community between festival workers, festival goers and bands," with an emphasis on an electronic music trend (most notably with Emily Wells), although "raw, rootsy, reverb-drenched, dreamy, dramatic and other descriptors for guitar music" were in abundance. More generally, its ethos was that of a "manageable experience devoid of douche bags and marketing companies infiltrating every crevice of the event." Furthermore, "For a fourth year festival, Treefort is pretty mature. Over a five-day stretch, some 400 bands play about a dozen venues throughout downtown Boise, from impromptu outdoor stages to small clubs and arcades. The lineup is strong, the organization is admirable and, perhaps most importantly, the city loves to play host. The result is a fishbowl scenario wherein bands and fans are constantly running into each other, exchanging remarks, ideas, cigarettes and contact info in Idaho’s delightfully compact capitol... When Treefort assembles, the entire city puts on the festival wristband." More generally the festival was also characterized for having demonstrating Boise's potential "to nurture the convergence of the big, bright, sprawling, conservative, mountain, desert west and the dark, creative, lush, liberal, urban centers of the Pacific Northwest." While the number of attendees has increased annually, the percentage of out-of-towners remains steady at roughly 25%, and baristas’ tip averages doubled.

In October it was announced that the 2015 festival had broken even, and that Treefort had in the summer become a Benefit Corporation (B Corp), the only music festival in the U.S. with that status. "We have often stated that we are a 'for profit entity ran like a non-profit' because we have always been a values-based project, driven by a purpose much more than the lure of profit. In the summer of 2014, we were presented with a legal option for which we could best represent who we are as a festival, as community members and as a business -- the Treefort Leadership Team officially formed Treefort, LLC and began seeking B Corp certification to lock in and protect the legacy principles the festival was founded upon."

=== 2016 ===
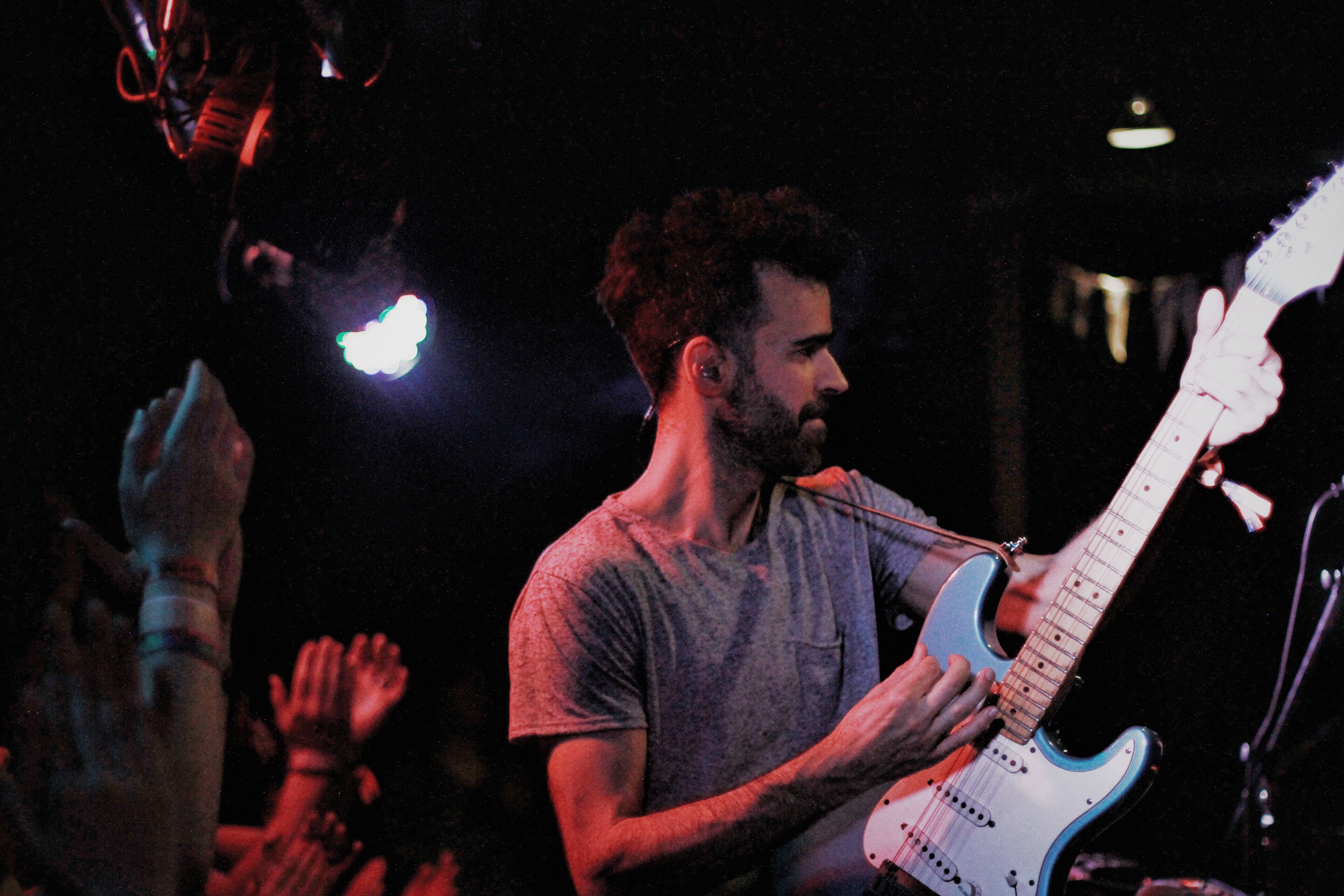
Geographer (2016) Treefort Music Fest

The 2016 lineup was expected to feature more than 400 bands, including notable Boise acts Built to Spill, Hollow Wood, Thomas Paul, Toy Zoo, The Dirty Moogs, Get Wet +, Dark Swallows and Edmond Dantes. Veteran acts jam band Leftover Salmon, and soul group Charles Bradley & His Extraordinaires were also booked. The full lineup, announced on February 12, included the indie acts Yacht, Chairlift, and Willis Earl Beal, and more than two dozen venues and 450 musicians and bands. Twenty-five of the bands were international, the most ever for Treefort, hailing from Japan, Italy, Israel, Australia, etc. Some of the approximately 600 Treefort volunteers also contributed to local non-profits in keeping with their community ethos.

The fifth annual festival was acclaimed as "possibly the most dynamic fest in the Northwest," and "a unique celebration of art and music."

=== 2017 ===
The sixth annual Treefort's initial announcement of 75 bands was characterized as being, as usual, "an insanely eclectic geyser of bands"; ultimately 411 bands were announced in a "fake news," mockumentary, news satire format. With a wide variety of "forts," initial non-musical offerings ranged from a seminar by refugees (hosted by Mayor Dave Bieter himself) to Jungo Blizzard, a macro-puppet 25 feet tall with an arm span of 45 feet based on the video game character from Primal Rage which is too large to get onto the main stage but which is generally expected to be ambushing festival goers, to symposiums on podcasts. More than 20 volunteers (of the 700 volunteers overall) set up Treefort regalia throughout downtown Boise utilizing its comprehensive yet incremental aesthetic which subtly changes annually.

Musically, one reviewer opined that "With a lineup so large, at Treefort it’s as easy to miss everything as it is to miss nothing. Having a planned schedule when approaching the fest is mainly a plan for fools as the best part about Treefort is stumbling on to those afternoon pop-up sets at the Modern Hotel, or being just a little too deep in your Axe Handle IPL to march from the Linen Building to Pengilly’s. Either way, no one leaves Treefort disappointed, and everyone leaves with a new favorite artist." A British reviewer remarked that "The mood on the fourth day of Boise, Idaho’s big music blowout... was buoyant and as bright as the sun shining on festival-goers all through downtown Boise," and months afterwards, after the disastrous Fyre Fest and given the continuing backlash against Coachella, Treefort was held up as an exemplary "little party monster" and "holistic arts festival" with a "'come sit with us' vibe which pulses throughout the town."

Additionally The Boise All-ages Movement Project (styled B-AMP), an Idaho nonprofit which provides for inclusive venues for all ages of musicians and audiences which uses the pop-up retail model, joined the festival.

=== 2018 ===
It was announced that the seventh annual Treefort would be headlined by George Clinton. The second round of artists announced included Rapsody, Jamila Woods, and Princess Nokia. The third and final round of artists featured notable Russian feminist agitprop rockers Pussy Riot and Cindy Wilson of B-52's fame, initially making for 442 acts in all, but ultimately 462 acts, including a plethora of under the radar bands. "Overwhelm is a real thing. There is a lot going on."

The Boise All-Ages Movement Project (BAMP) was particularly well received, as was George Clinton & P-Funk's set, illustrating the range of decades of musical talent from funk to punk. Ballet Idaho and Tispur provided an early, mesmerizing highlight, and black, queer transgender musician bell's roar (Sean Desiree) performed a funny, poignant set at the Linen Building. Newsweek noted in its review that within sixteen blocks downtown one could see "200 people doing yoga; a child’s face wrapped in virtual reality goggles; a dozen bands arranged in a circle... [and] celebrity chefs plating Wagyu beef." Thousands of people from around the world enjoyed the final days of the festival.

Idaho was the only red state on Pussy Riot's first North American tour, and their politically charged concert (more political rally than traditional concert) had people standing in line for nearly two hours; audience members raised their fists in solidarity as they played their music videos and performed, whereas some in the back of the venue left several songs into the set.

Despite the occasionally inclement weather (it snowed on the morning of the final day), one power outage, and cancellations (one due to visa issues), both the inclusiveness of Treefort, bringing together as it does every imaginable walk of life, and the stellar musical acts, caused it to be hailed as "the greatest music festival in the country." Although its profit did not increase, the 2018 festival experienced its largest consecutive year increase, with 24,000 people attending, a 33% jump from 2017's 18,000 attendees.

=== 2019 ===
The 8th Annual Treefort featured the headliners Liz Phair, Dan Deacon and Angélique Kidjo's Remain in Light (the latter of whom had to cancel due to illness). Music Festival Wizard opined that "Boise in Idaho may sound like an odd city choice for an epic festival, but the Treefort festival continues to impress us year after year. Treefort typically takes places the week after SXSW to take advantage of artists heading back to the Northwest. Short lines and a welcoming city continually keeps Treefort at the top of our list." 432 bands and solo artists had been booked, amongst other endeavors, in a collective ensemble which has been described as "exhilarating" and which "inspires swells of creativity." Paste Magazine noted that "There’s no space or tolerance for foul moods at Treefort, where the music is good and the people are great." Along these lines, an updated, comprehensive sexual harassment policy was put in place which featured on ubiquitous signage.

=== 2020 ===
The initial line-up for 2020 (released November 2019) featured 120 bands from 14 countries, with the headliners being Chromatics and Japanese Breakfast. Penultimately however the festival was postponed until September 23–27 due to the COVID-19 pandemic, and ultimately until both September 22–26, 2021, and March 23–27, 2022, whereupon it was planned to become an annual vernal festival again.

=== 2021 ===
Proof of COVID-19 vaccination and/or a negative result was required of all performers, staffers, attendees and volunteers. Ticket sales were limited, particularly given that triage crisis standards of care had only days prior been implemented statewide. Despite the ongoing pandemic, many artists originally scheduled to play the 2020 festival did in fact play the 2021 festival, including Japanese Breakfast, Built to Spill, Mannequin Pussy, and a huge selection of local and regional artists. Masks were required at all indoor venues, with very high compliance from audience members at most shows, including outdoor shows that drew crowds. At the event, 695 attendees were tested on-site (18 of whom tested positive and were sent home to quarantine themselves), 80–85% were fully vaccinated, and 76 free vaccinations were given. There were 15,475 total attendees over the five days, a decrease of approximately 40% vis-à-vis the prior two festivals.

=== 2022 ===
The festival returned to nearly its pre-COVID attendance, with a larger line-up and more five-day pass-holders than ever before; the headliners were Surf Curse, Unknown Mortal Orchestra, Dinosaur Jr., and more.

=== 2023 ===
The festival injects a record-breaking $11M into the local economy, in part due to the soggy weather.

=== 2024 ===
Nearly 500 bands feature, including 37 international artists from Australia, Iceland, Japan, Malawi, New Zealand, and Ukraine. A local ad agency sets up an augmented reality installation at the mural-laden Freak Alley, "Freakfort"; unusually its patrons do not know which band (and their schedules) any particular mural or graffiti their smartphones shall serendipitously invoke. Hackfort demonstrated the shared ethos of lock-picking and cybersecurity and held several tech seminars.

=== 2025 ===
Treefort turned a profit for the first time since the Covid-19 pandemic, injected $15.8 million into the local economy, and generated approximately $1.4 million in local and state taxes. The festival, was still finding its footing after its move to Julia Davis Park in 2023, saw its attendance increase approximately 20% from the previous year, and enjoyed its highest gross since its inauguration in 2012. Nearly 440 artists from 34 U.S. states and 18 countries (including but not limited to Australia, Japan, Mexico, Colombia, Chile, Peru, Brazil, and Canada) were scheduled.

=== 2026 ===
Over 500 artists were scheduled at more than thirty venues, and thirteen thematic "forts" were featured. Numerous events and/or venues were free and open to the public. On the high end, for the first time a "Secret Handshake VIP Pass" was on offer for $1499.

== Photo gallery ==
=== 2012 ===
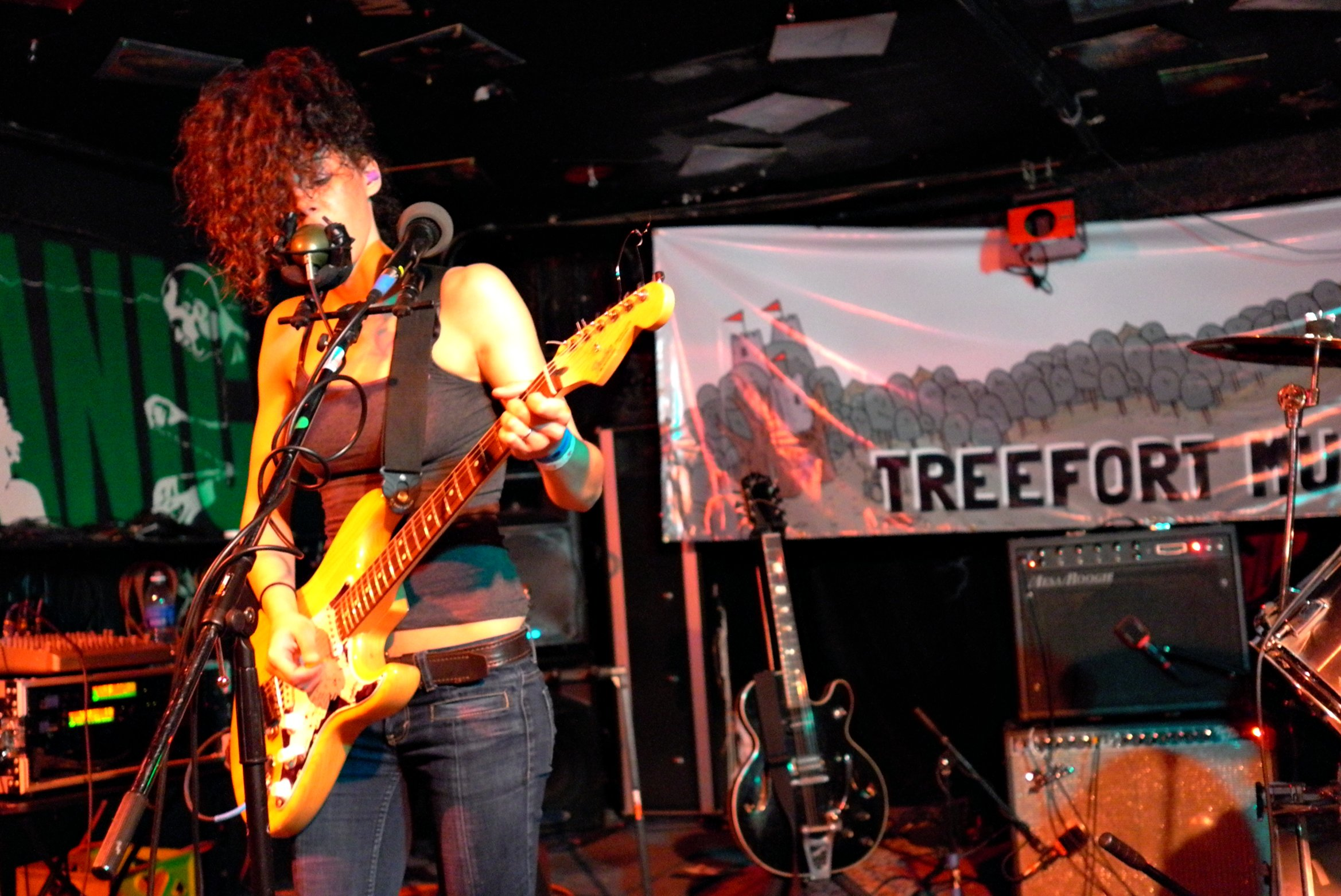
Mr. Gnome

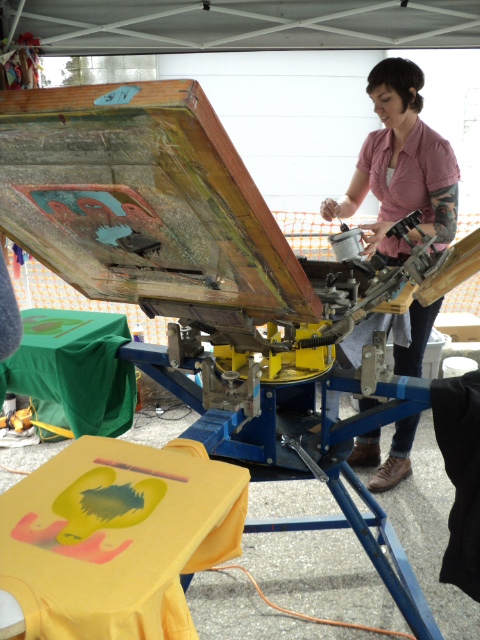
Silkscreening

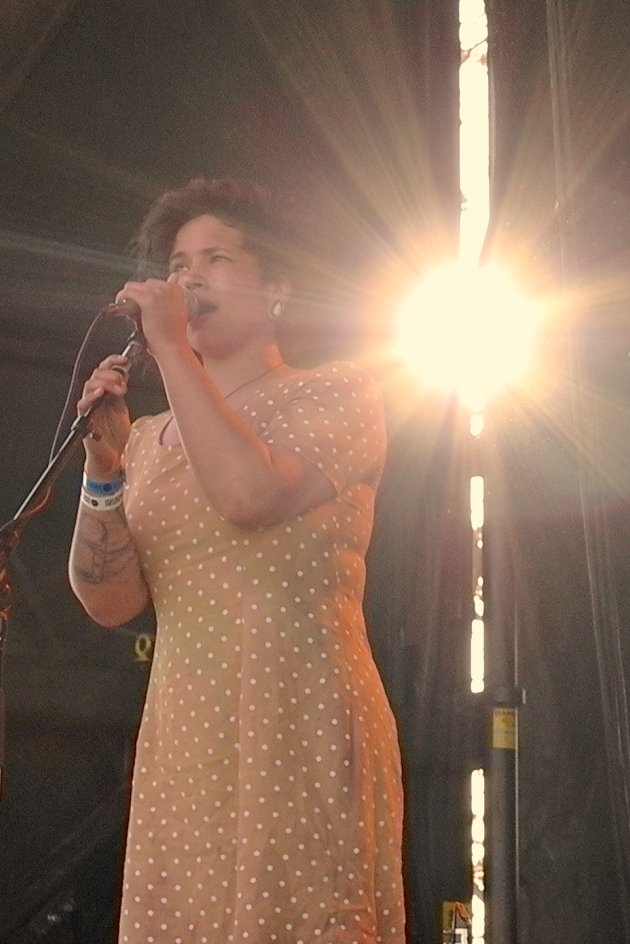
AU

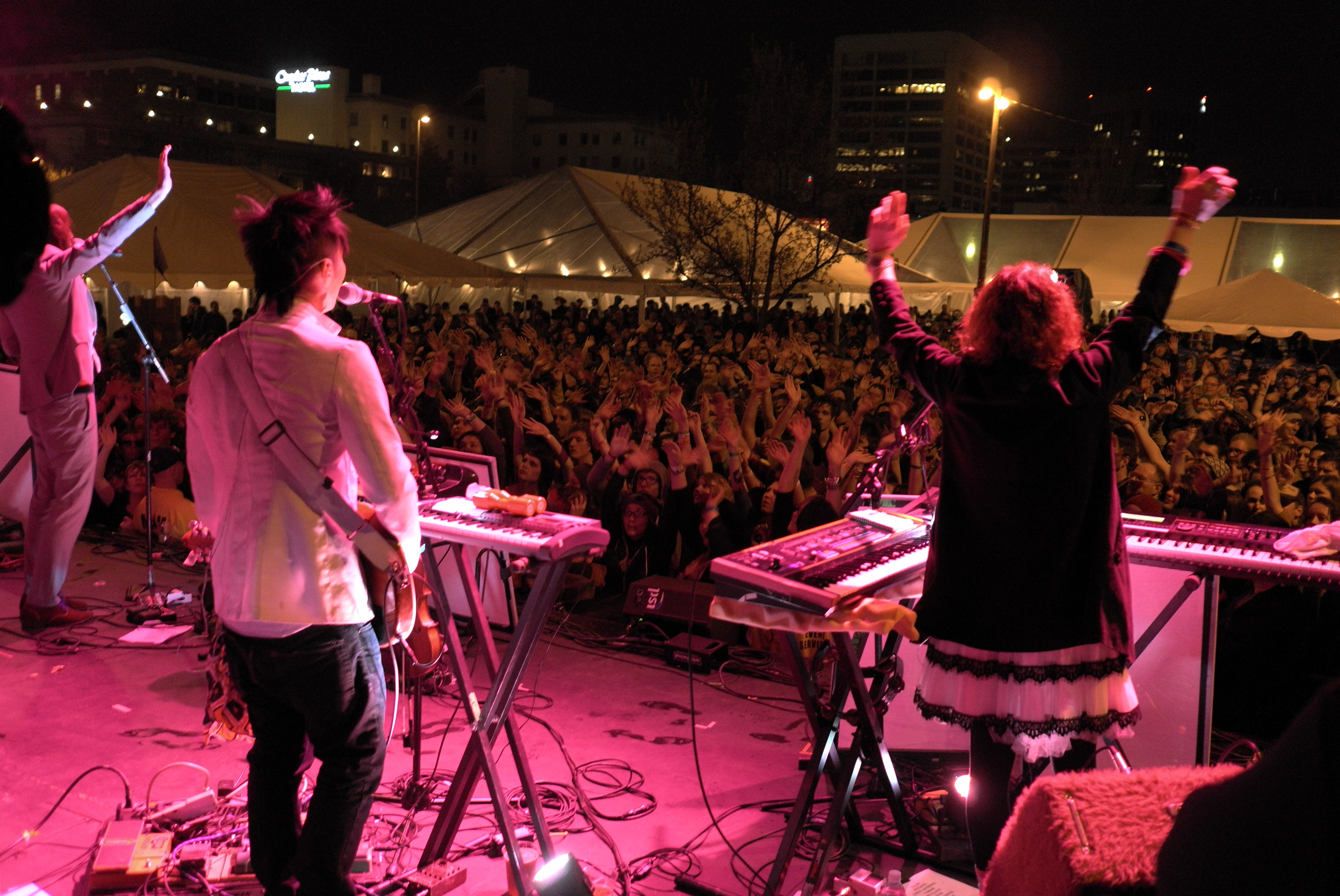
of Montreal

=== 2013 ===
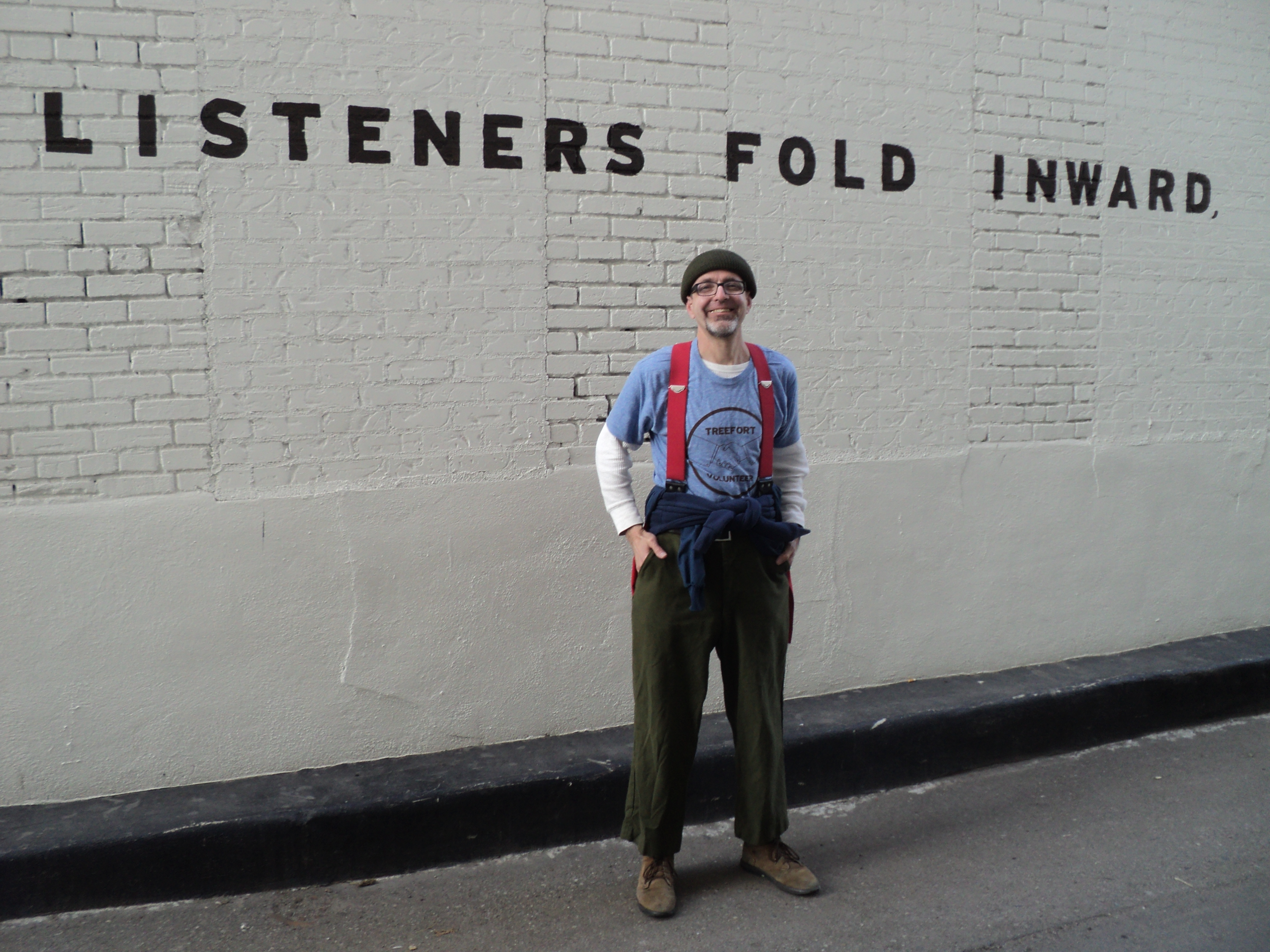
The cut-up technique in deliberately ephemeral public art.

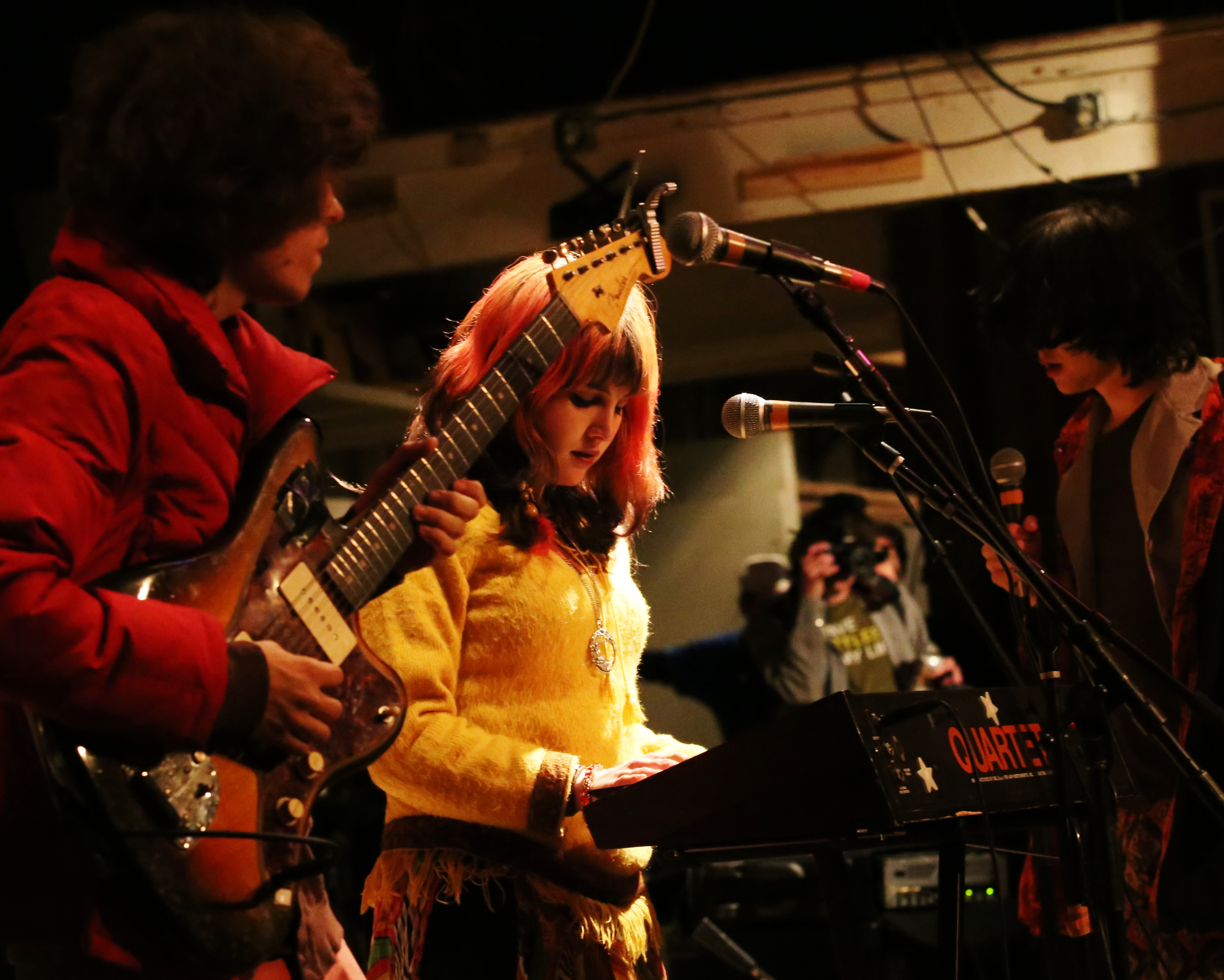
Foxygen of Los Angeles at their sold-out show on opening night at a Shriner venue

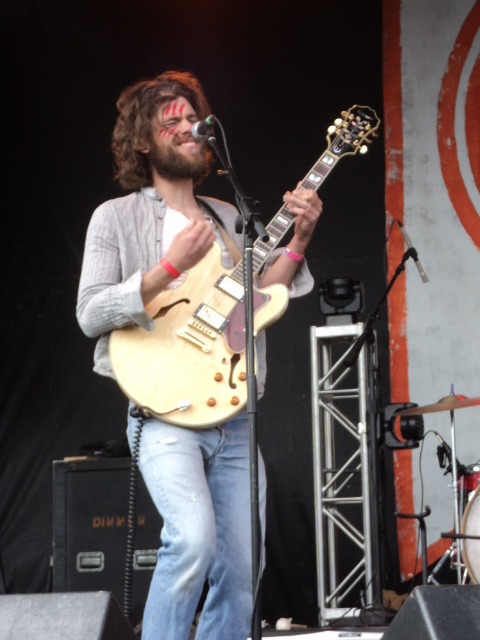
Boisean mainstays Sun Blood Stories performs on the main stage

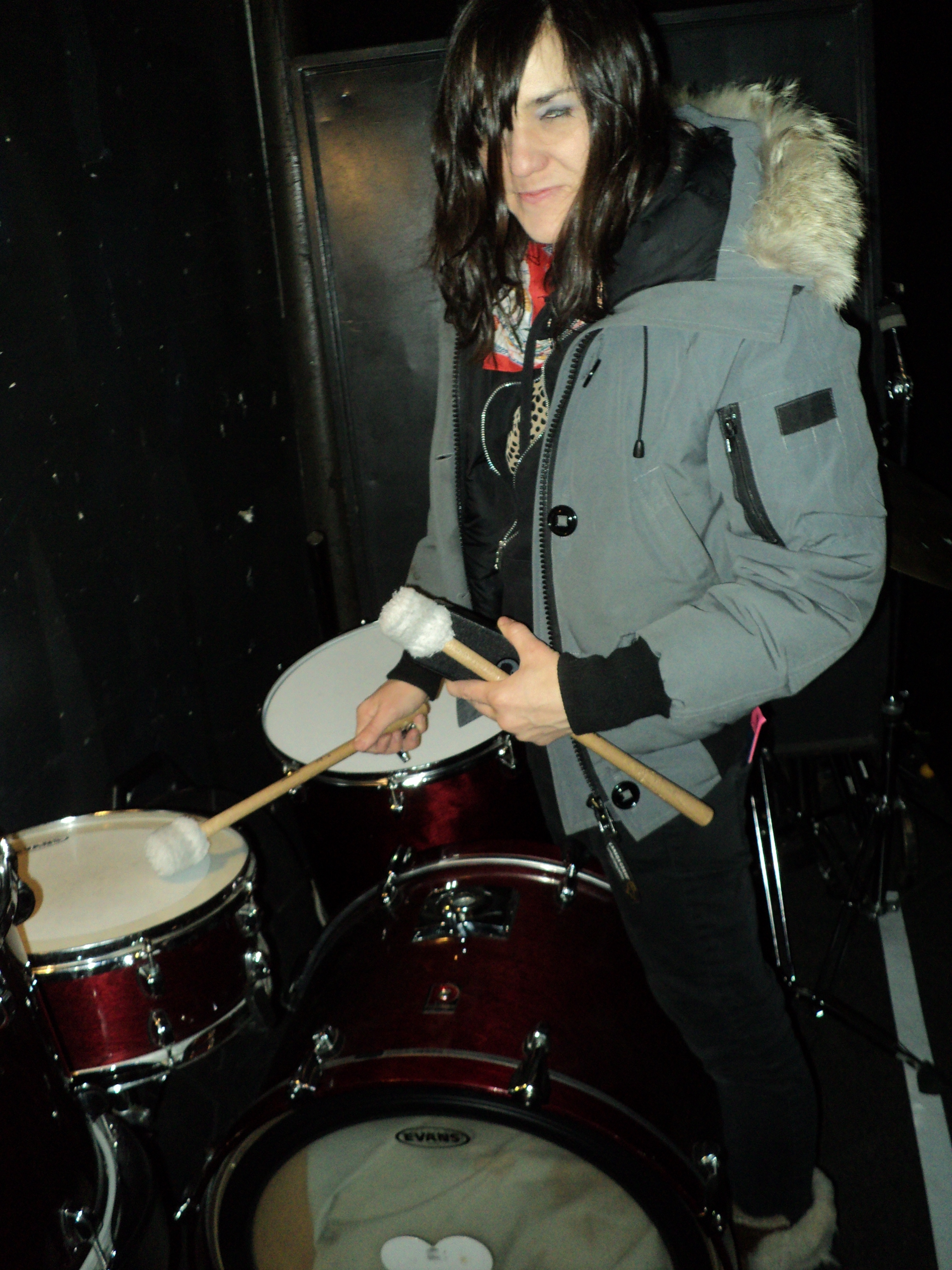
Emily Wells tuning her drum kit shortly before her sold-out show at The Neurolux

=== 2014 ===
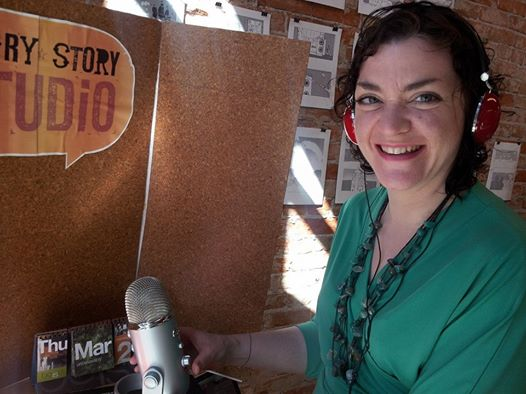
A curator of personal narratives at Storyfort

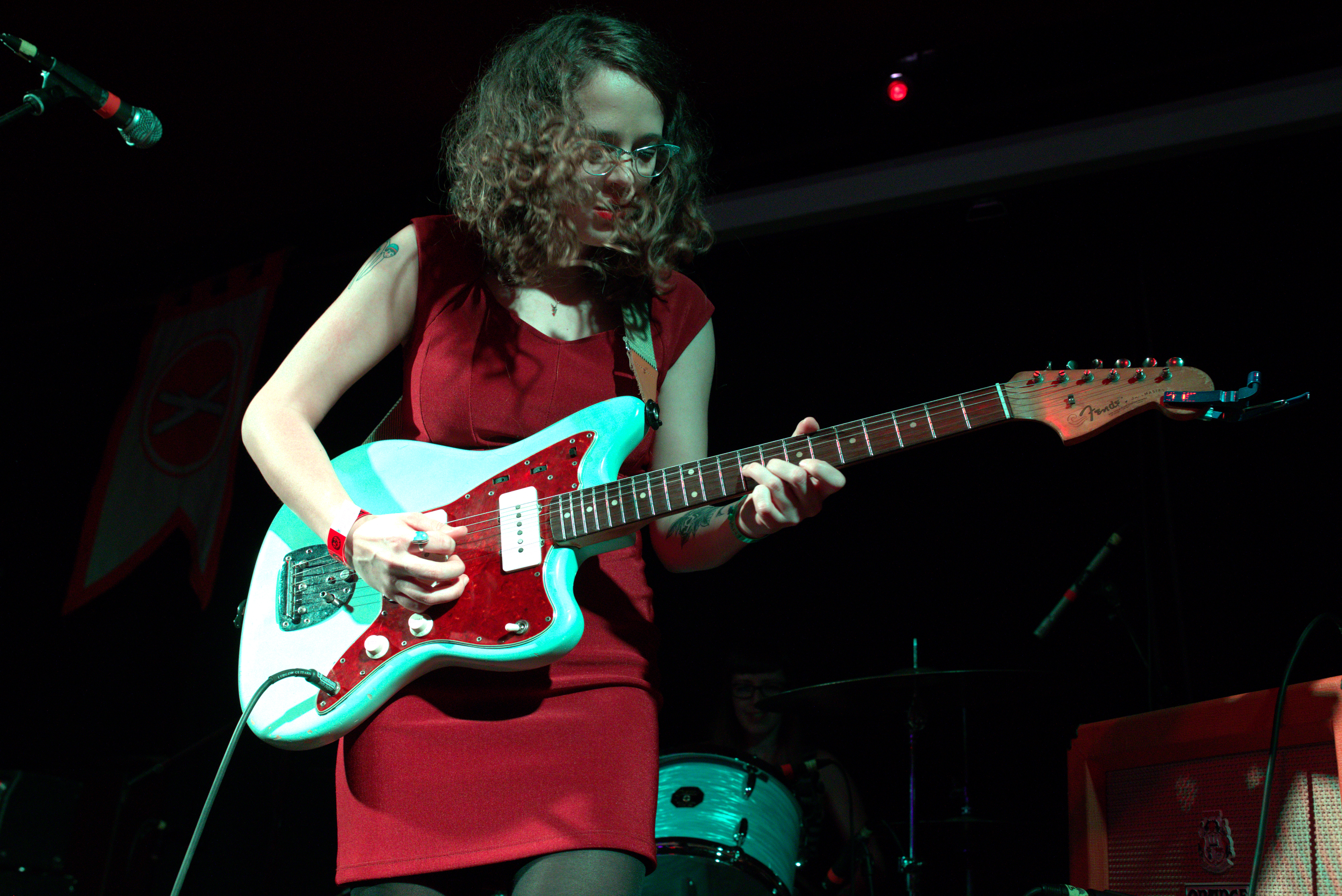
Sallie Ford

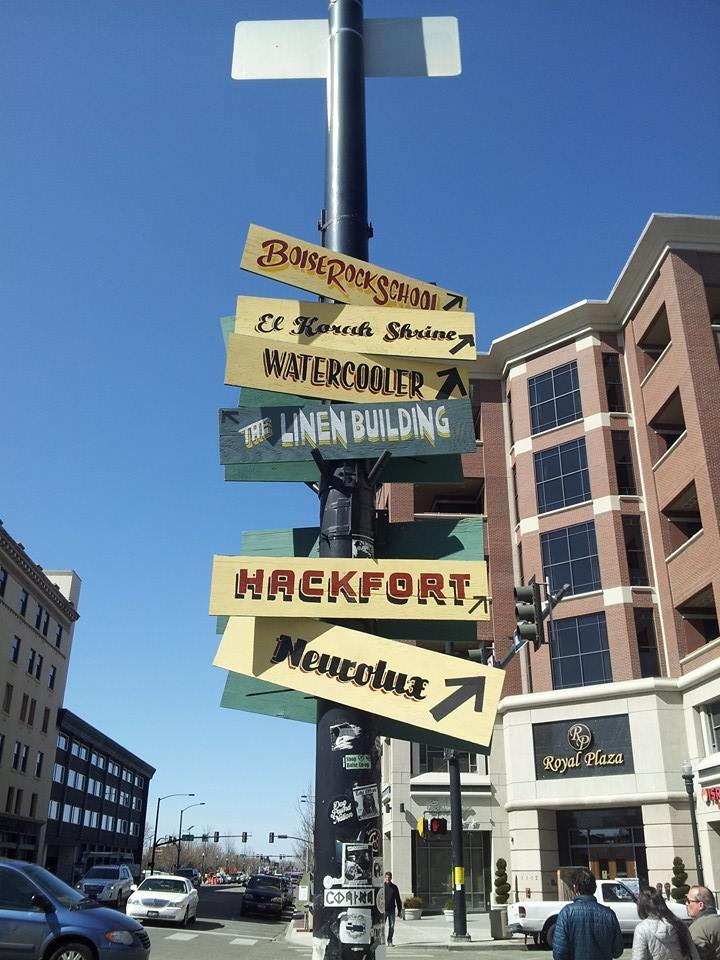
Fingerpost signage

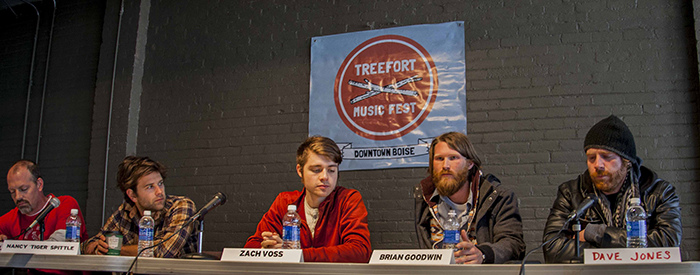
Music industry professionals discuss the nuts-and-bolts of the business in a video symposium

=== 2015 ===
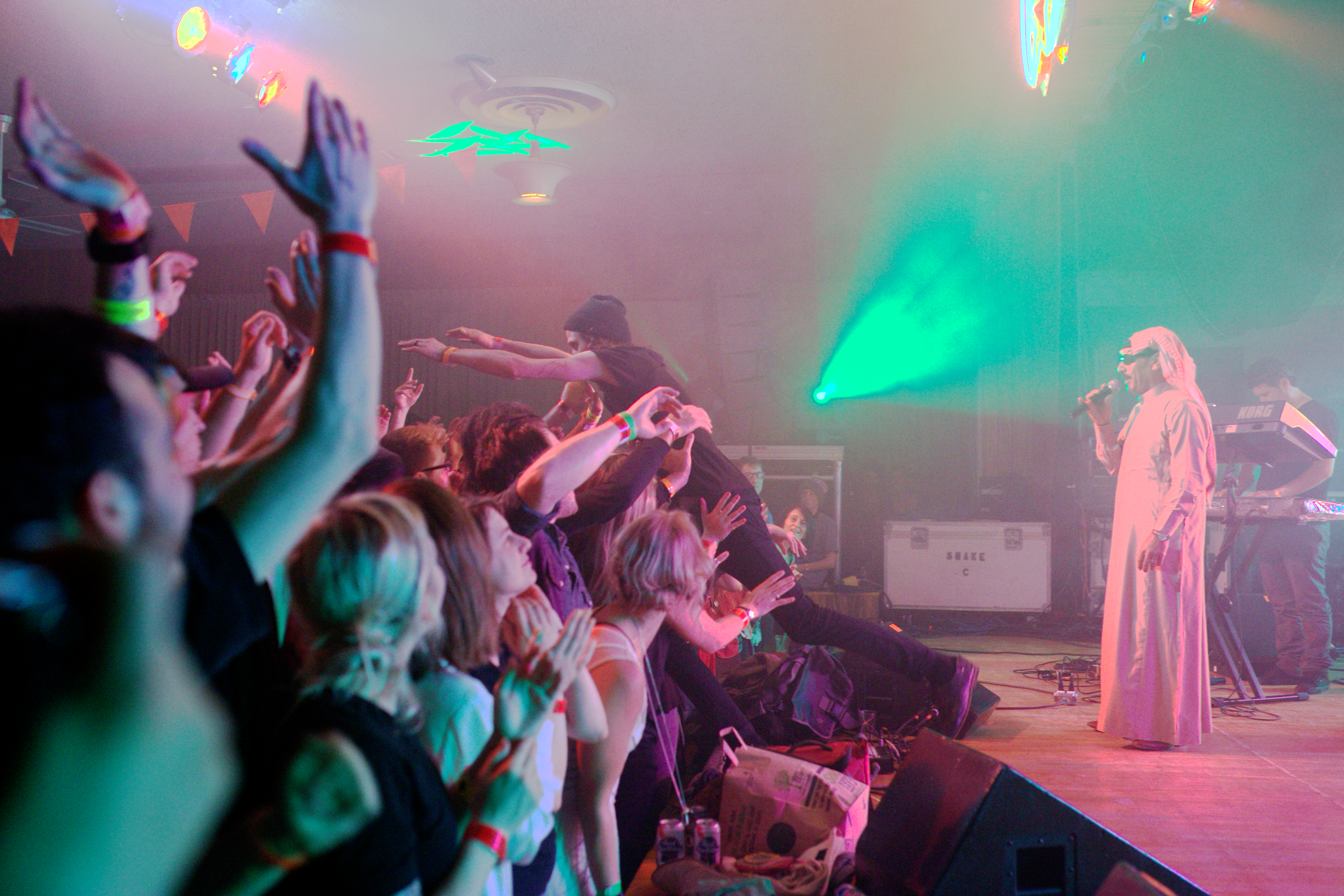
Omar Souleyman performs at El Korah Shrine to a packed crowd surfing audience

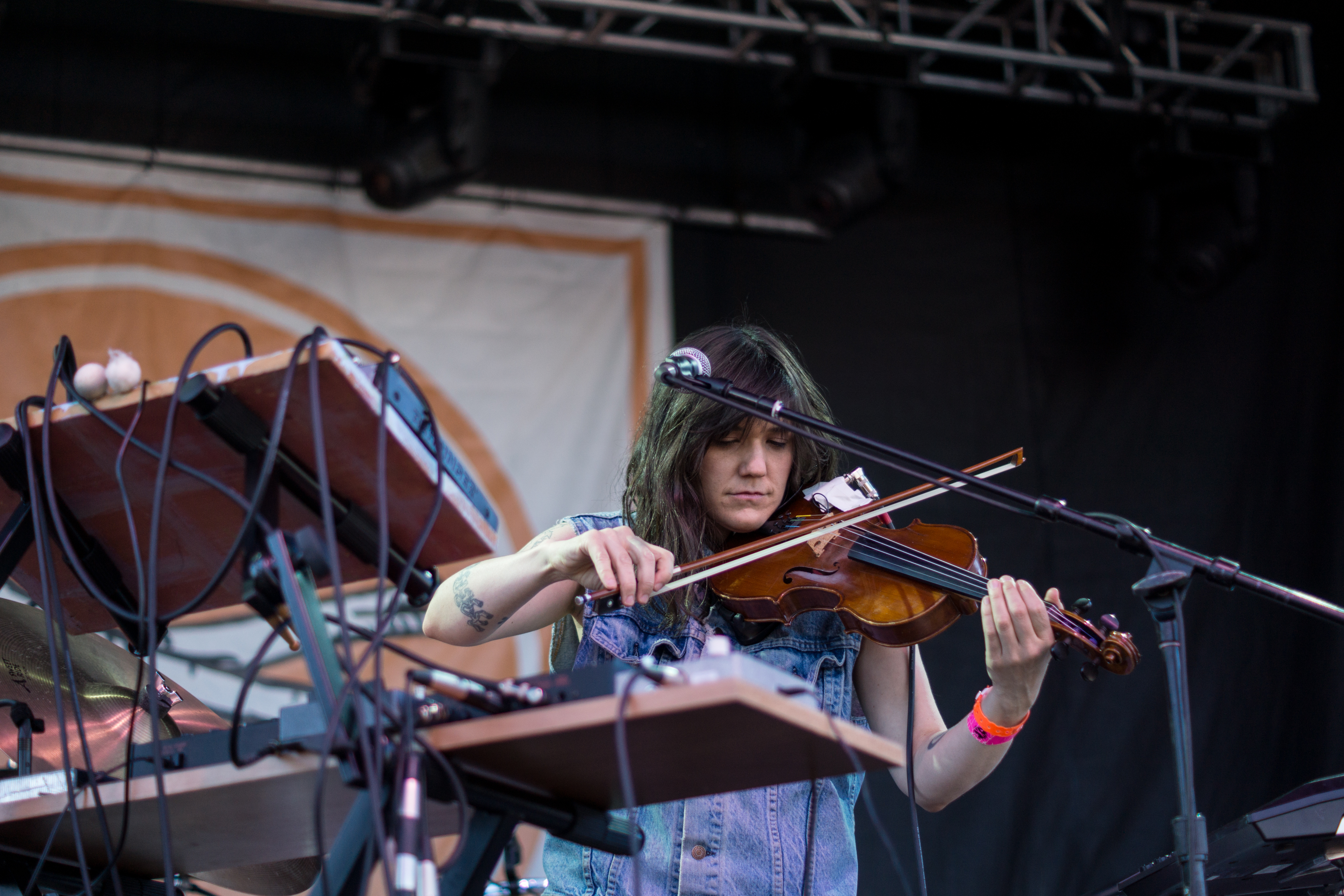
Emily Wells headlines

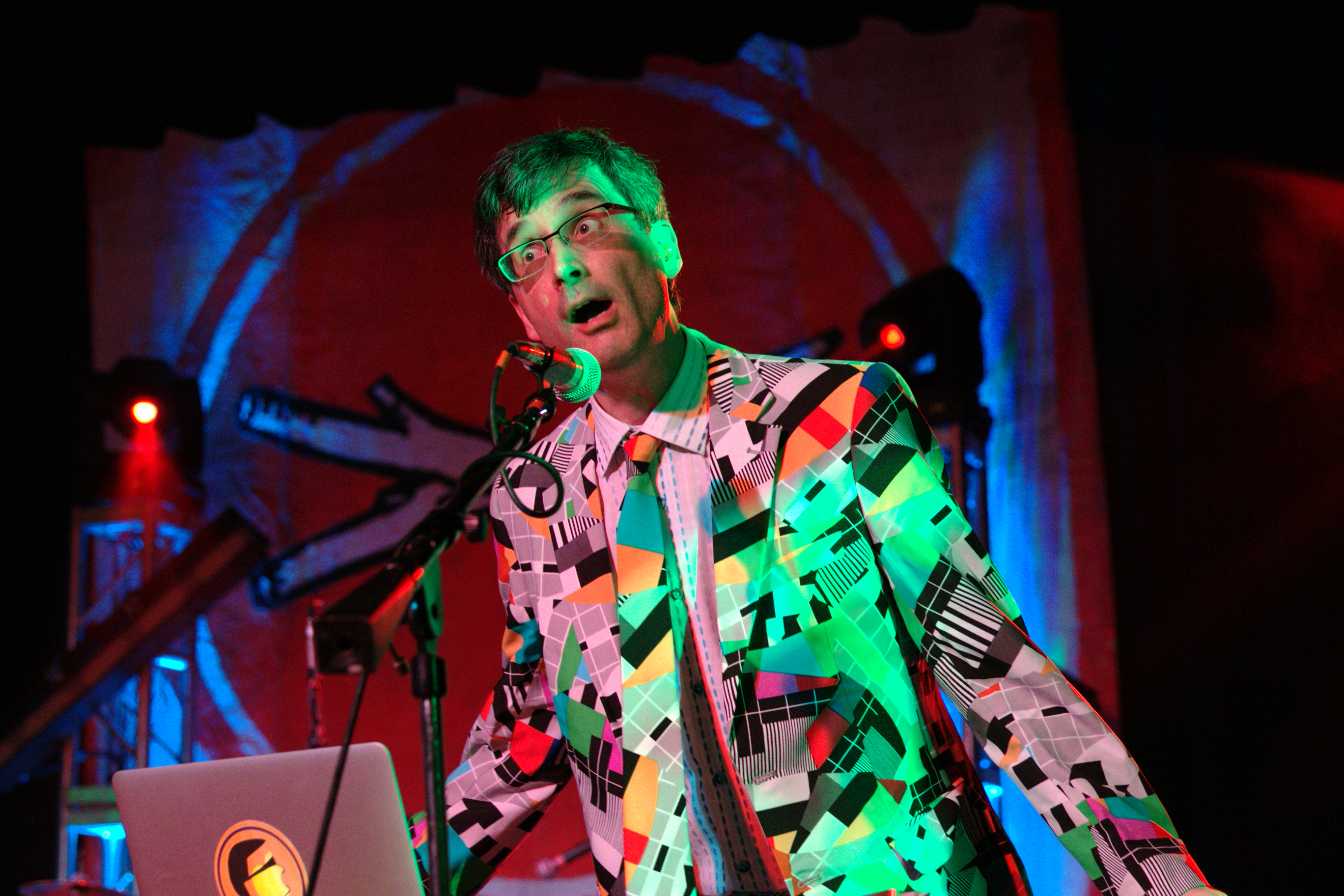
The Commonauts, a Boise High band which began in 1983, reunites

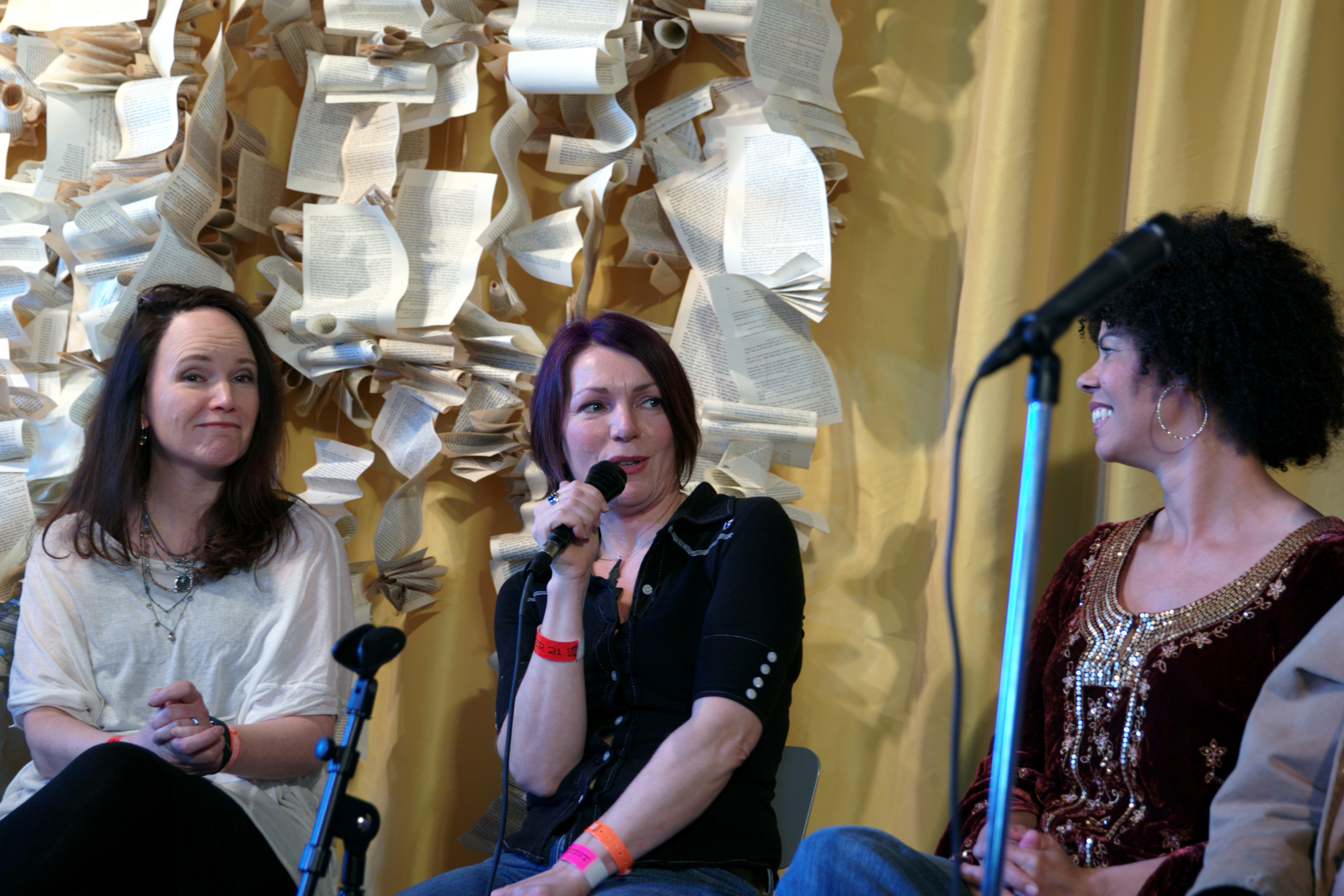
Oral history of Boise Rock seminar at Storyfort

=== 2016 ===
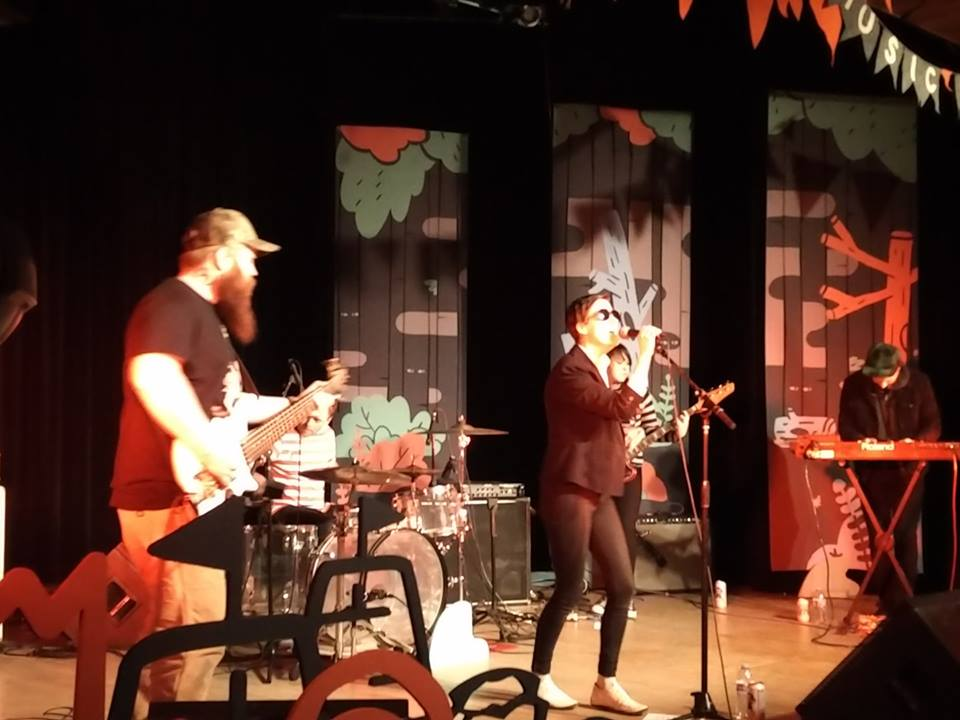
Locals Toy Zoo performs at El Korah Shrine immediately following volunteer orientation

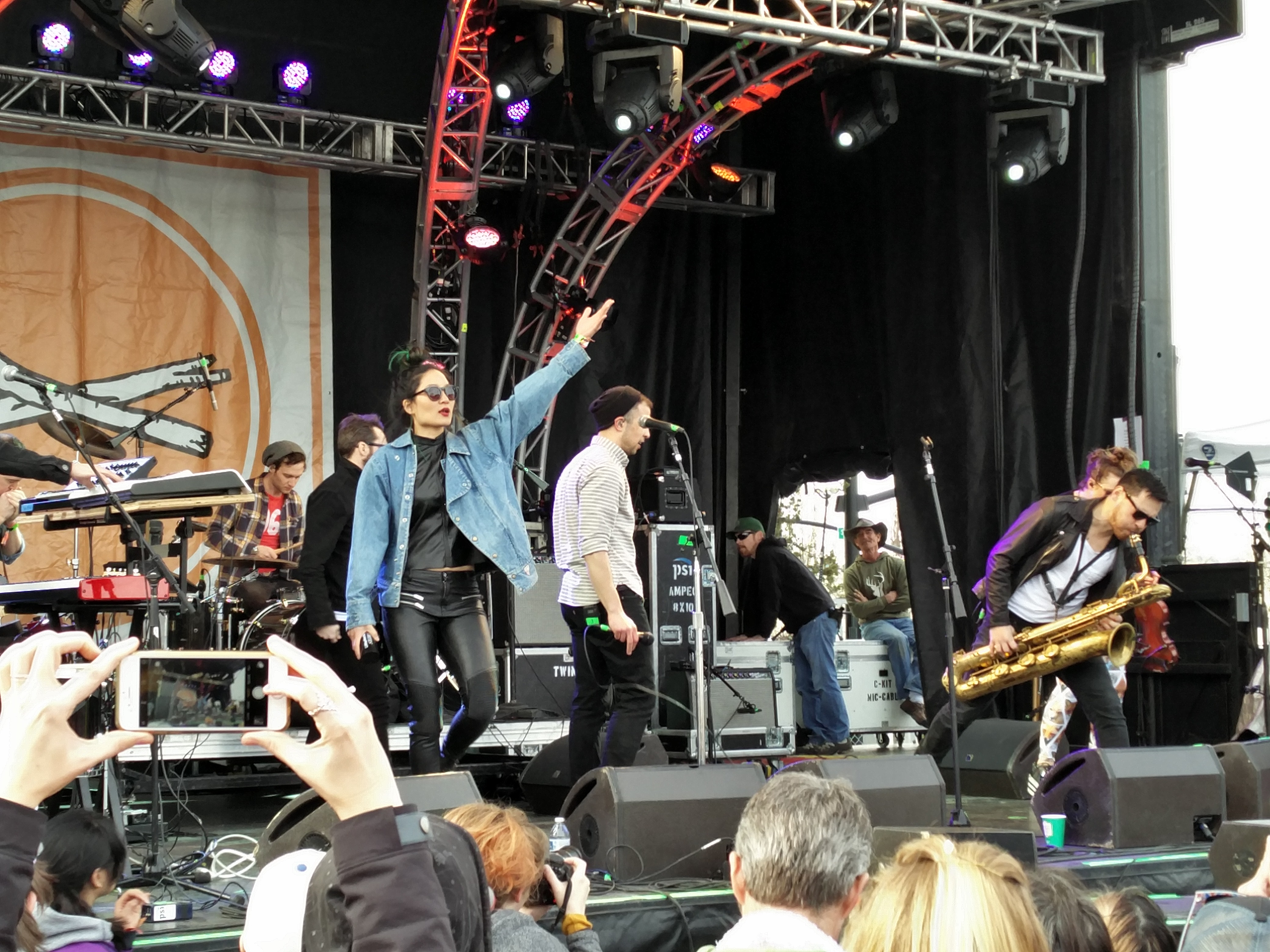
San Fermin of Brooklyn, New York

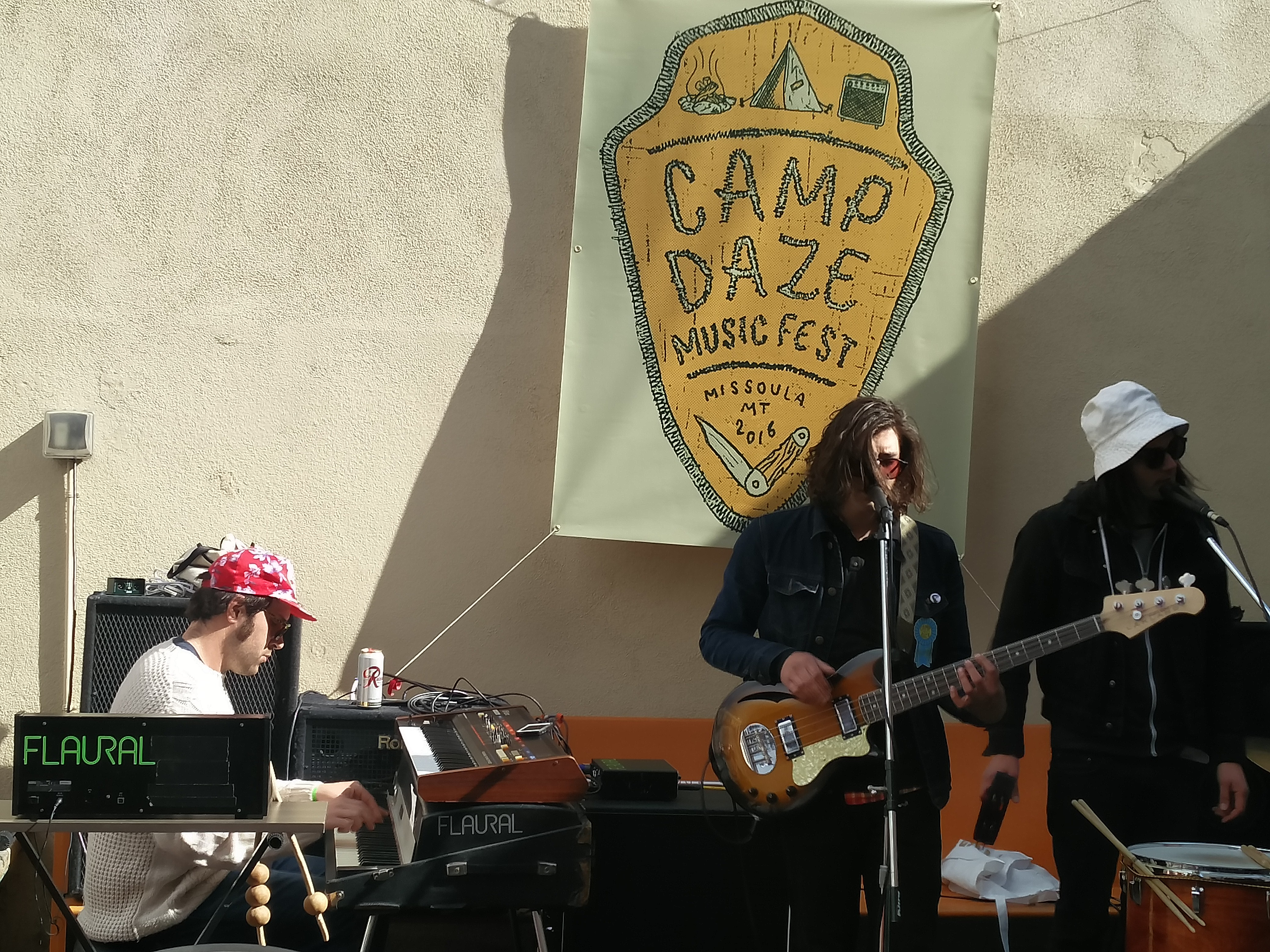
Flaural of Denver, Colorado

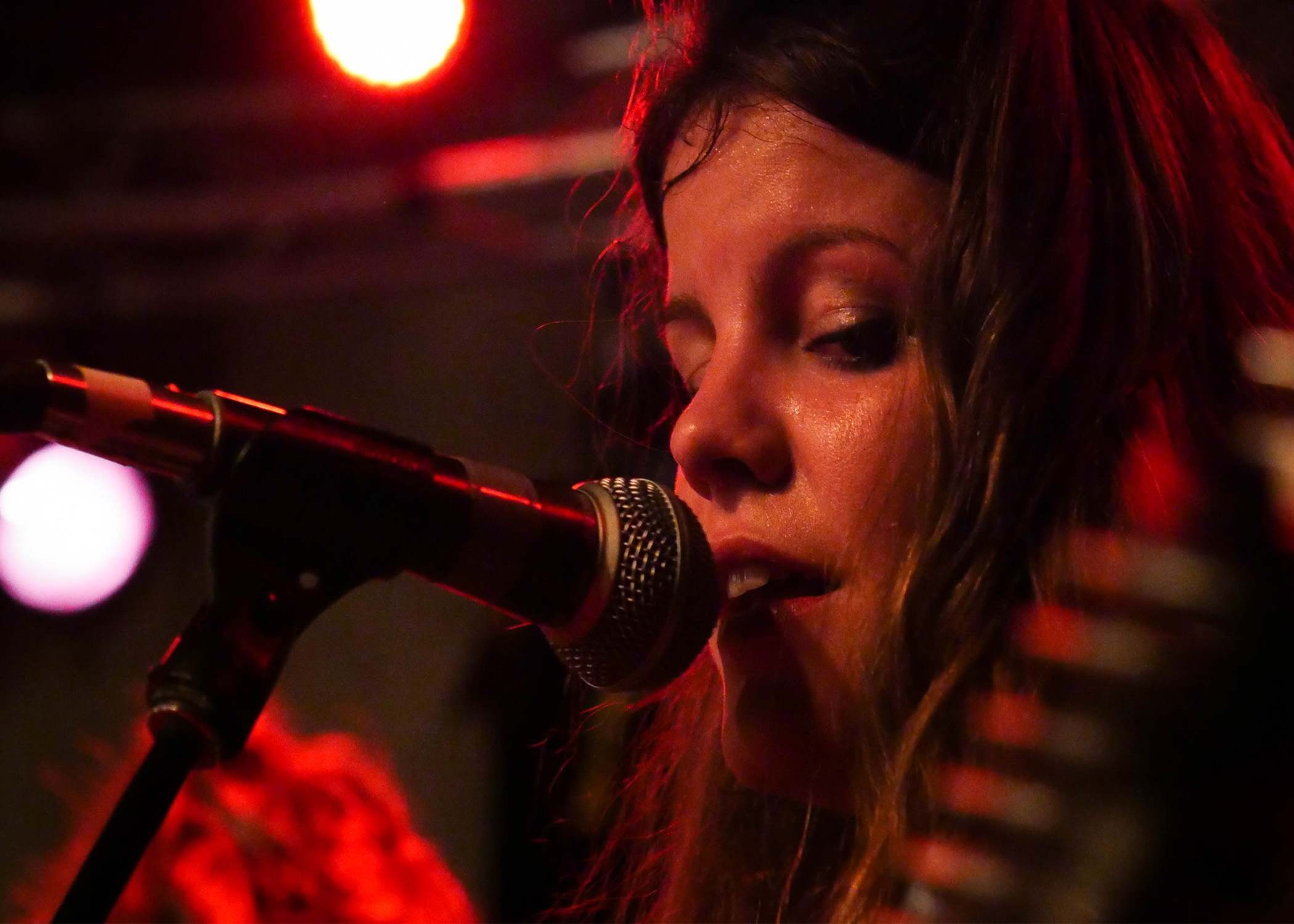
Hinds of Madrid, Spain

=== 2017 ===
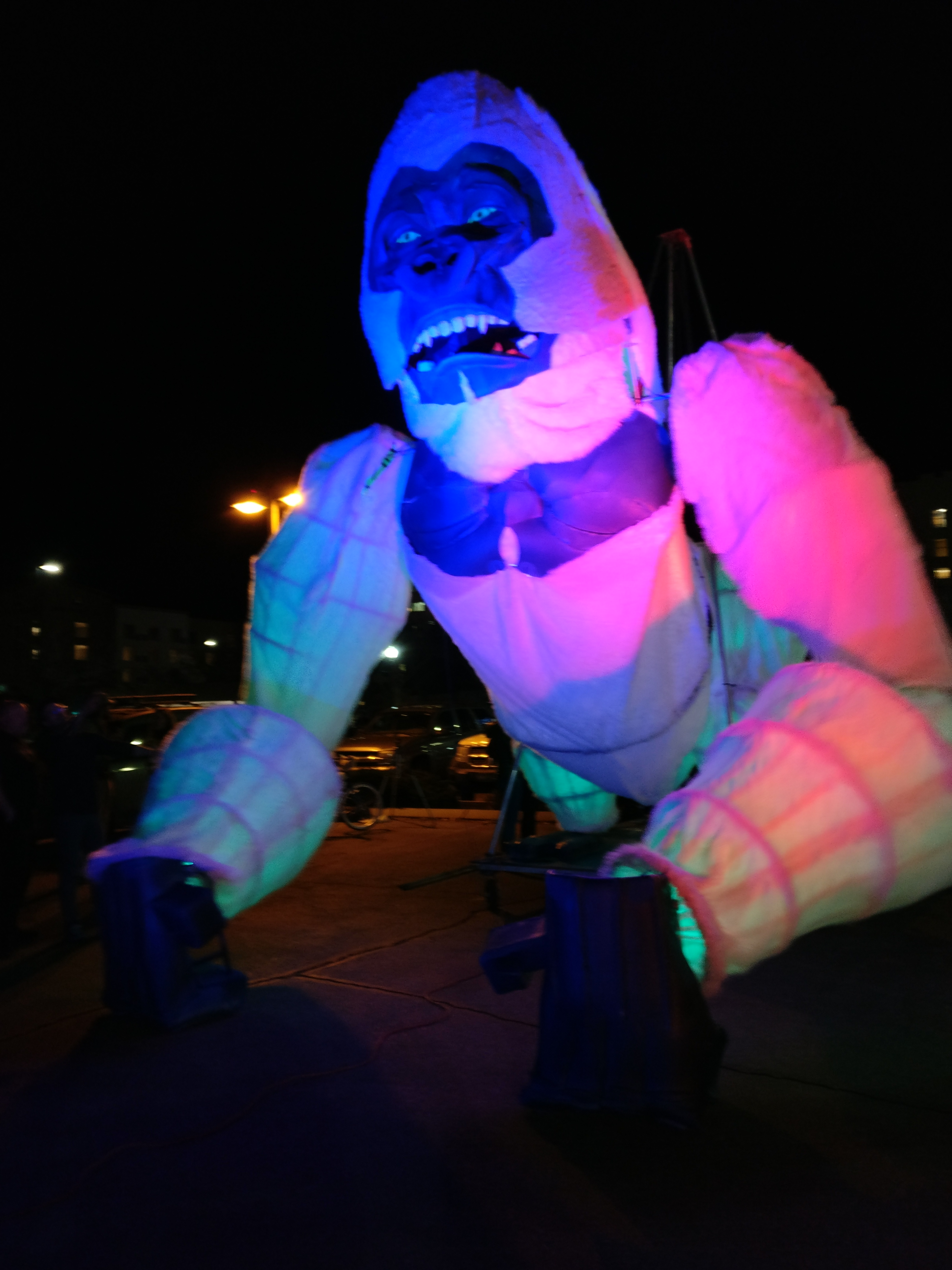
Jungo Blizzard, set to roam the streets of Boise

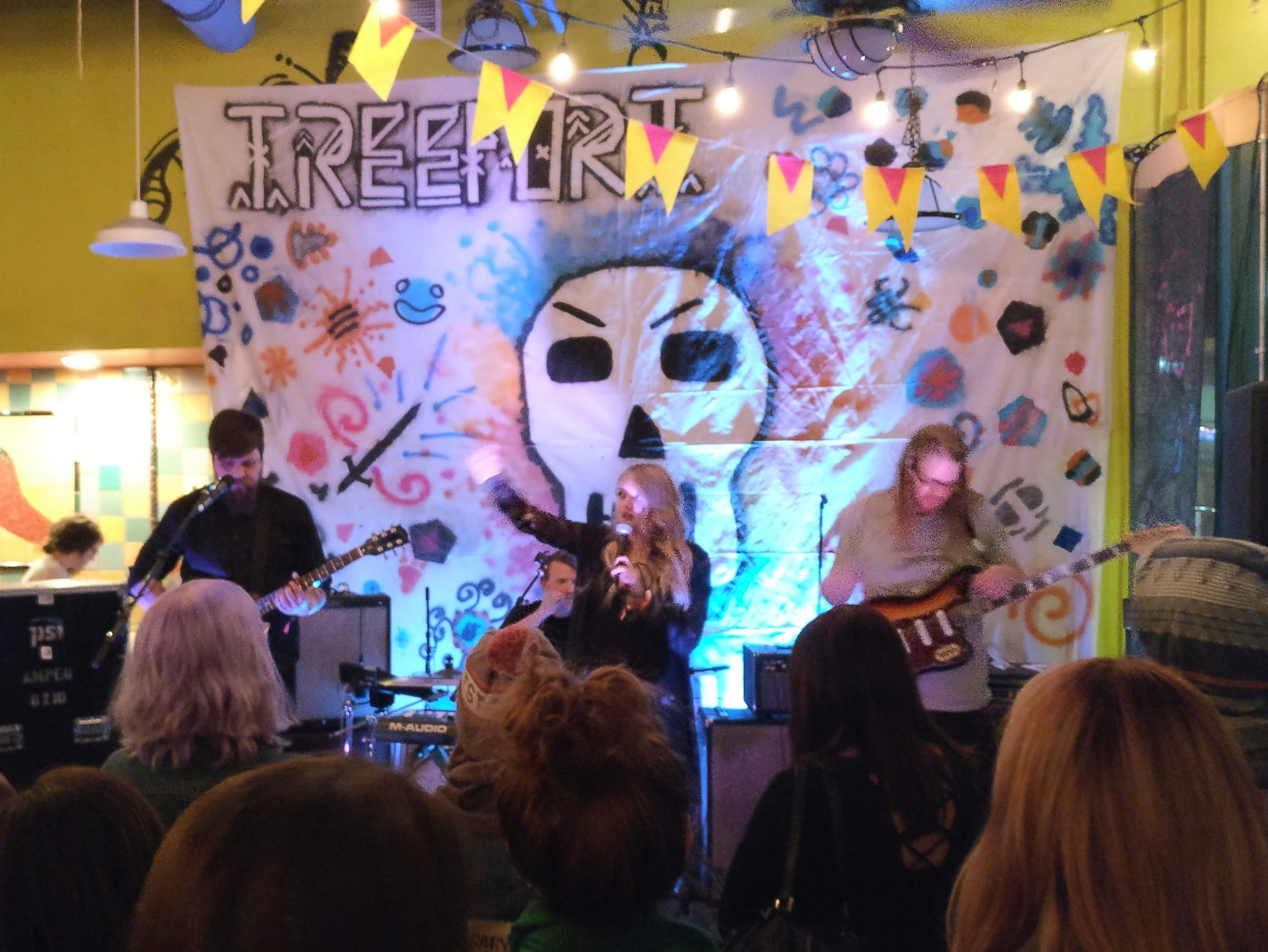
Local band We Are Apes performs under the aegis of the Boise All-Ages Freedom Movement at a family-friendly pop-up retail venue, here at a Mexican restaurant which does not typically host musical acts

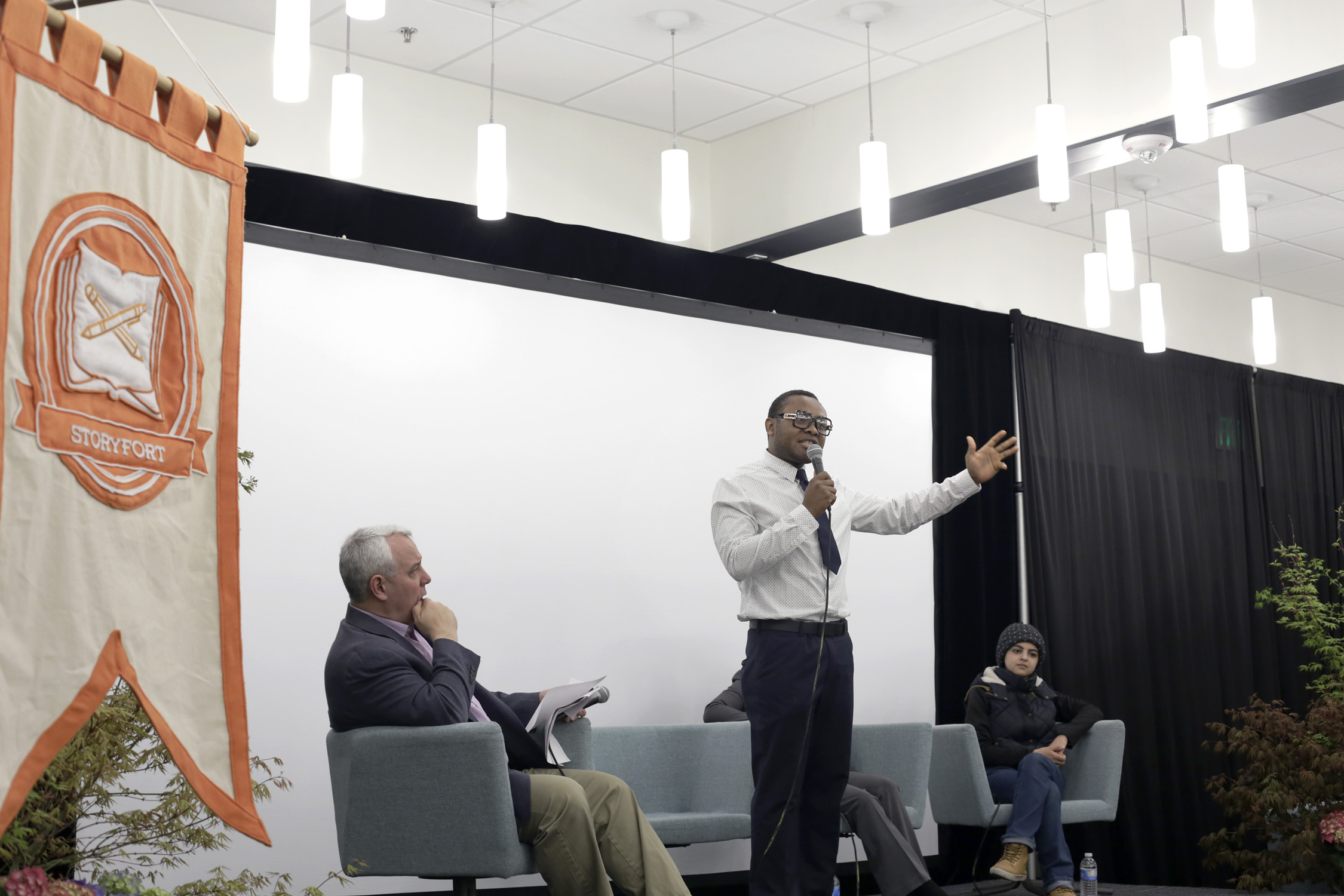
Refugees Patrick from Congo and Zuzu from Iraq with Mayor Dave Bieter

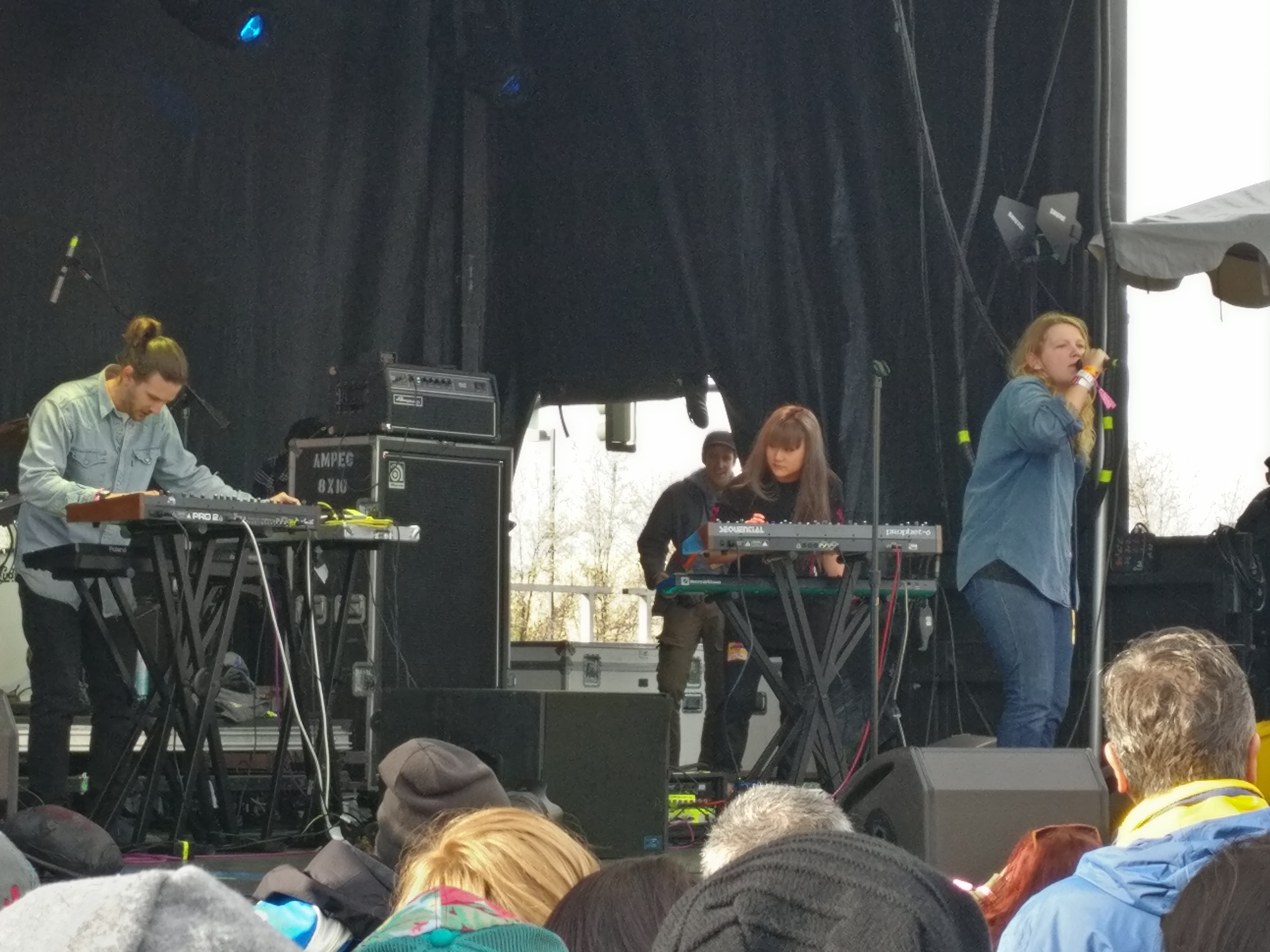
Kae Tempest performs ferocious hip-hop regarding South London in her signature piece Let Them Eat Chaos.

=== 2018 ===
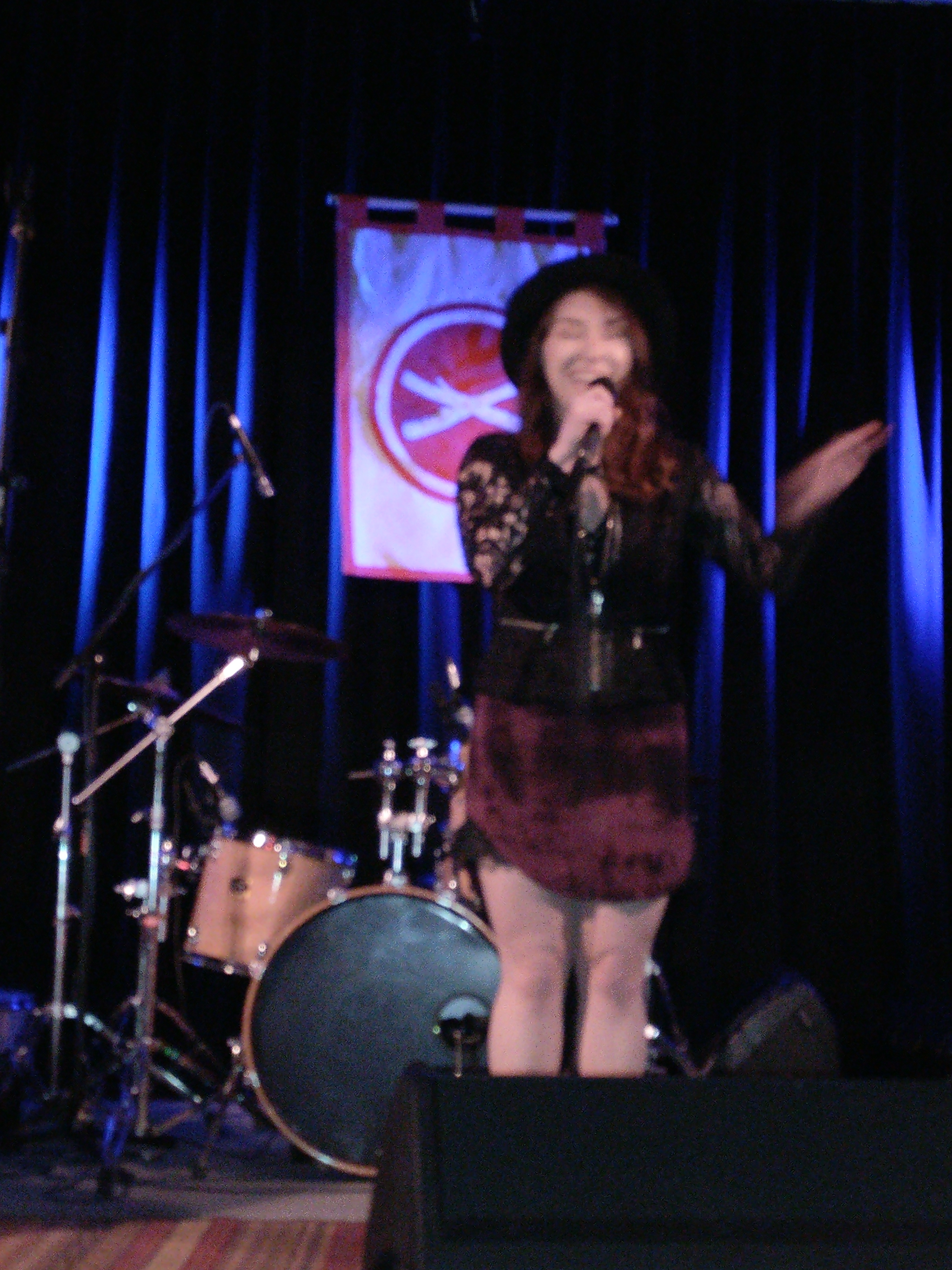
Local ensemble Madisun Proof kicks off the launch party with elegiac hip hop with elements of swing

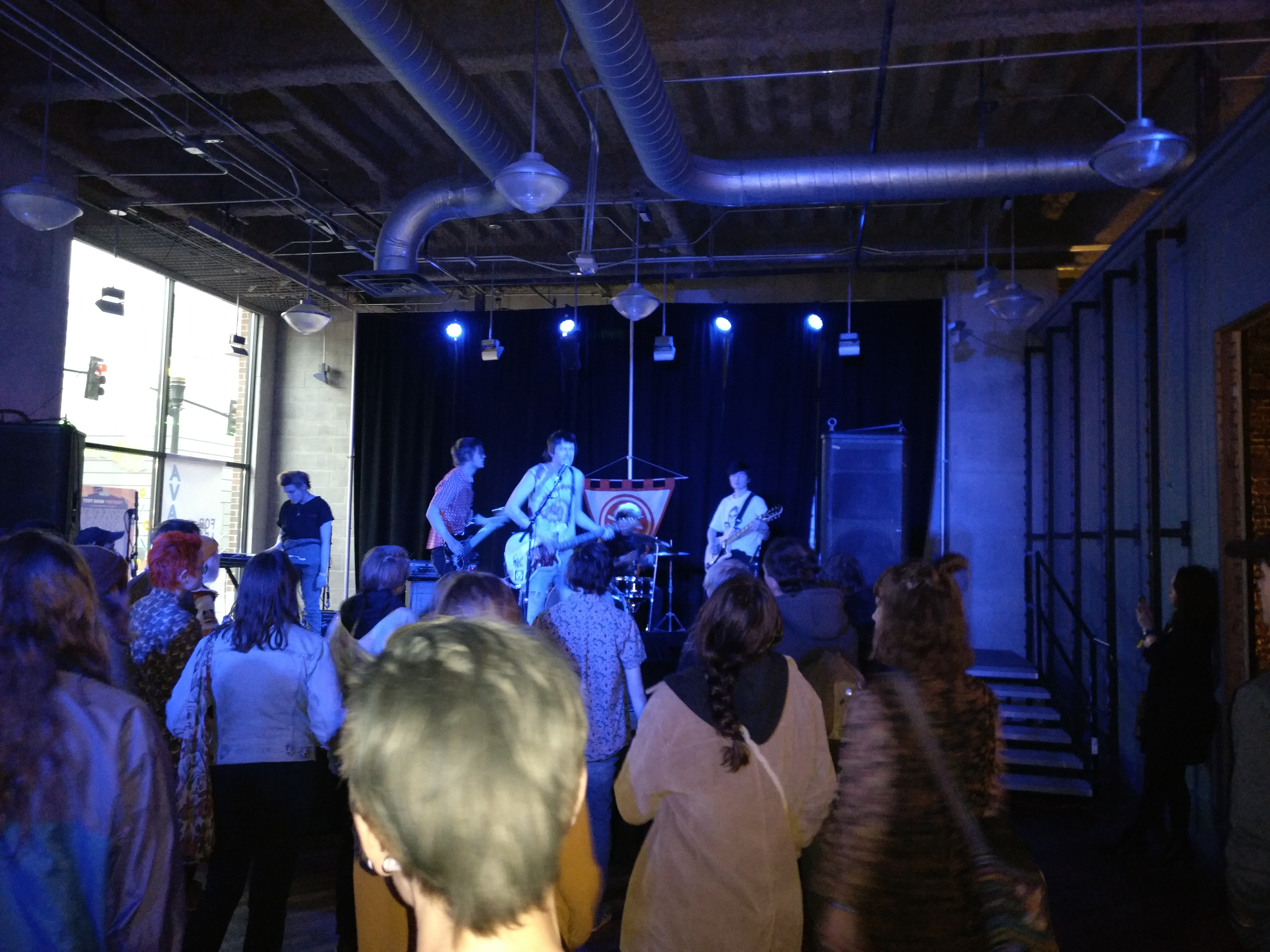
The minors of Shucking Fit rock out under the aegis of the Boise All-ages Movement Project (B-AMP) at a former Urban Outfitters location; Ballet Idaho also had a stage there

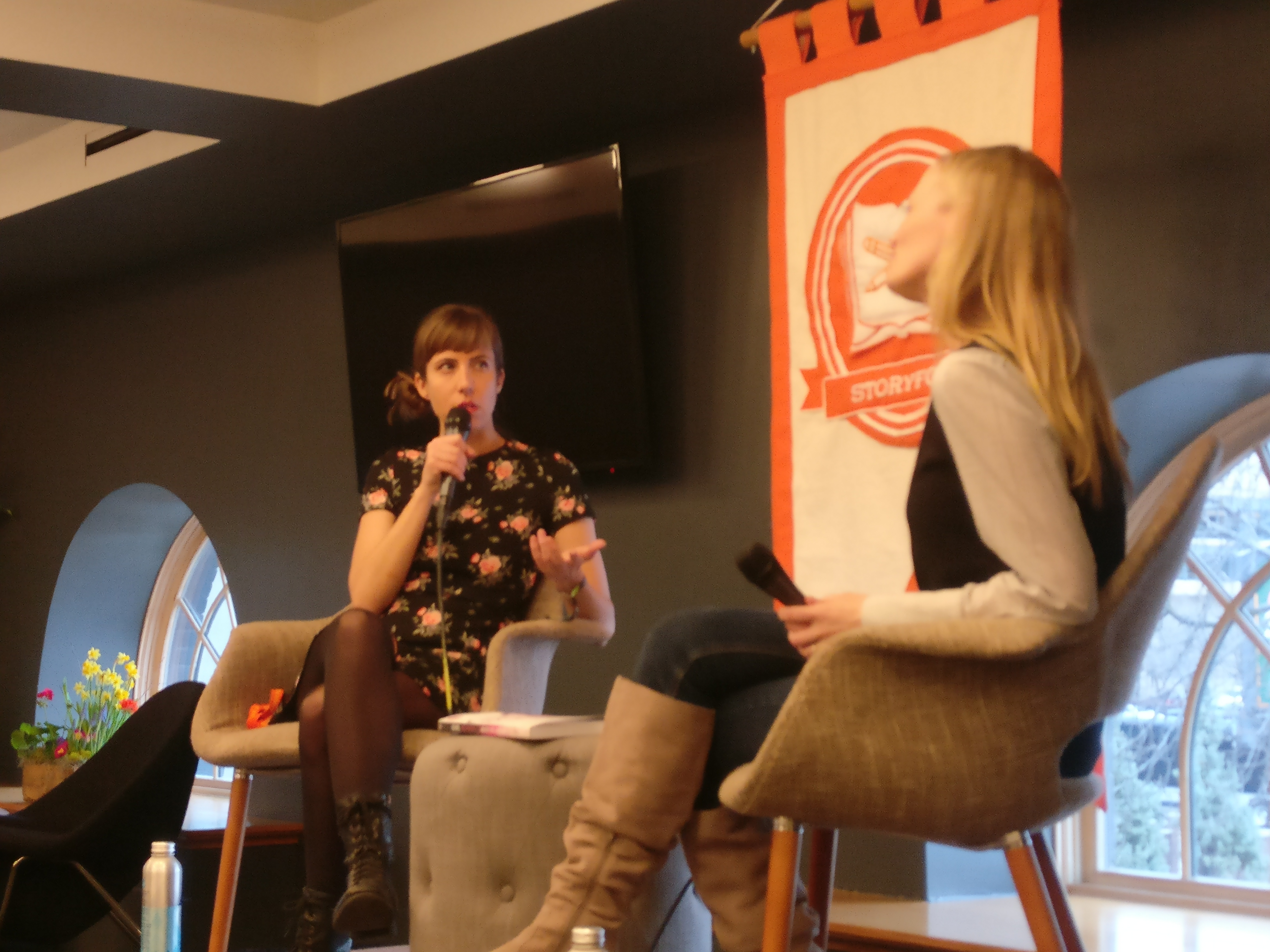
Emma Arnold speaks adroitly and hilariously about sexuality at Girl Boner at Storyfort

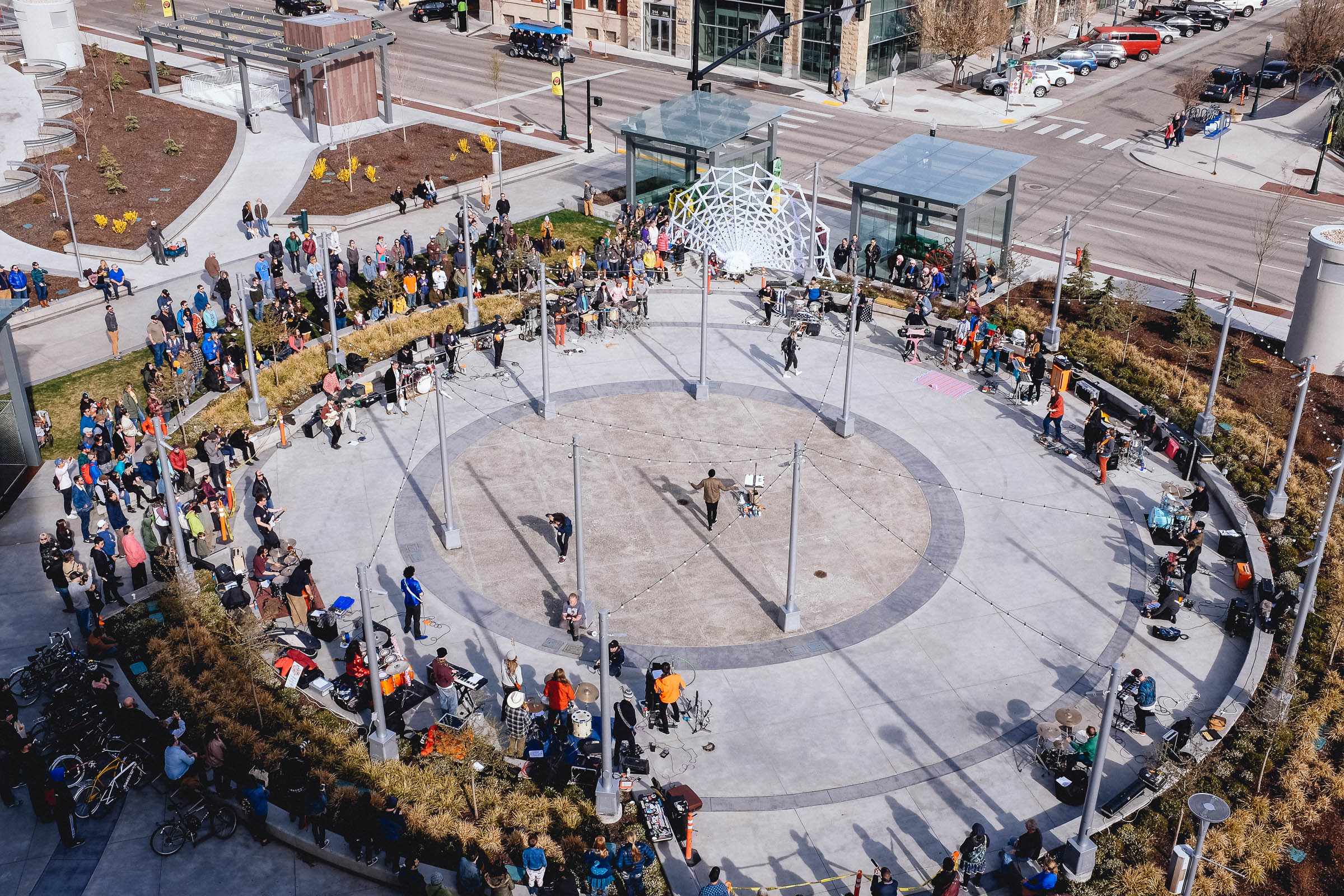
Seth Olinsky conducts Band Dialogue VII at Jack's Urban Meeting Place (JUMP) across from the Basque Block.

=== 2019 ===
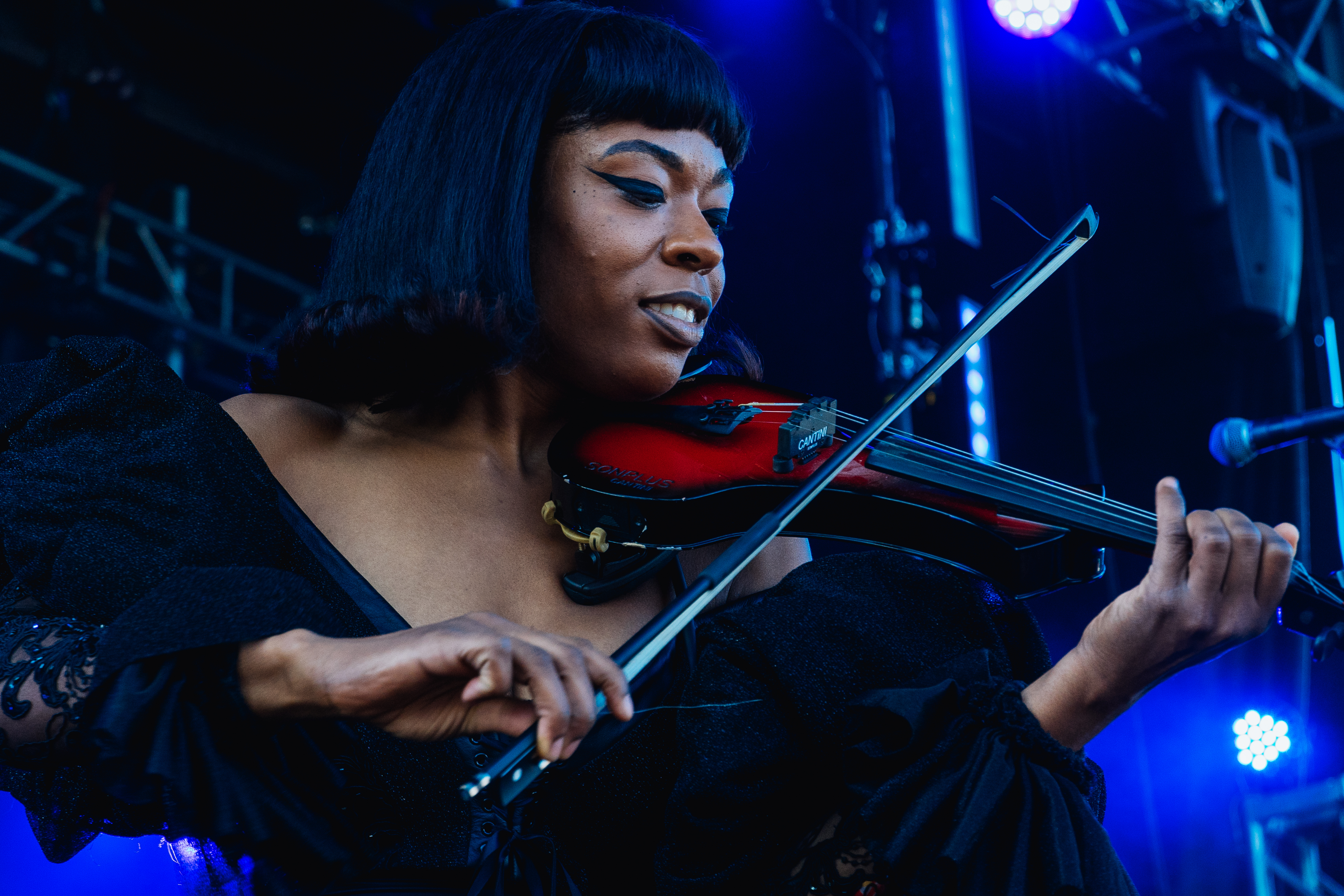
Sudan Archives on the main stage with distinctive electronic looping

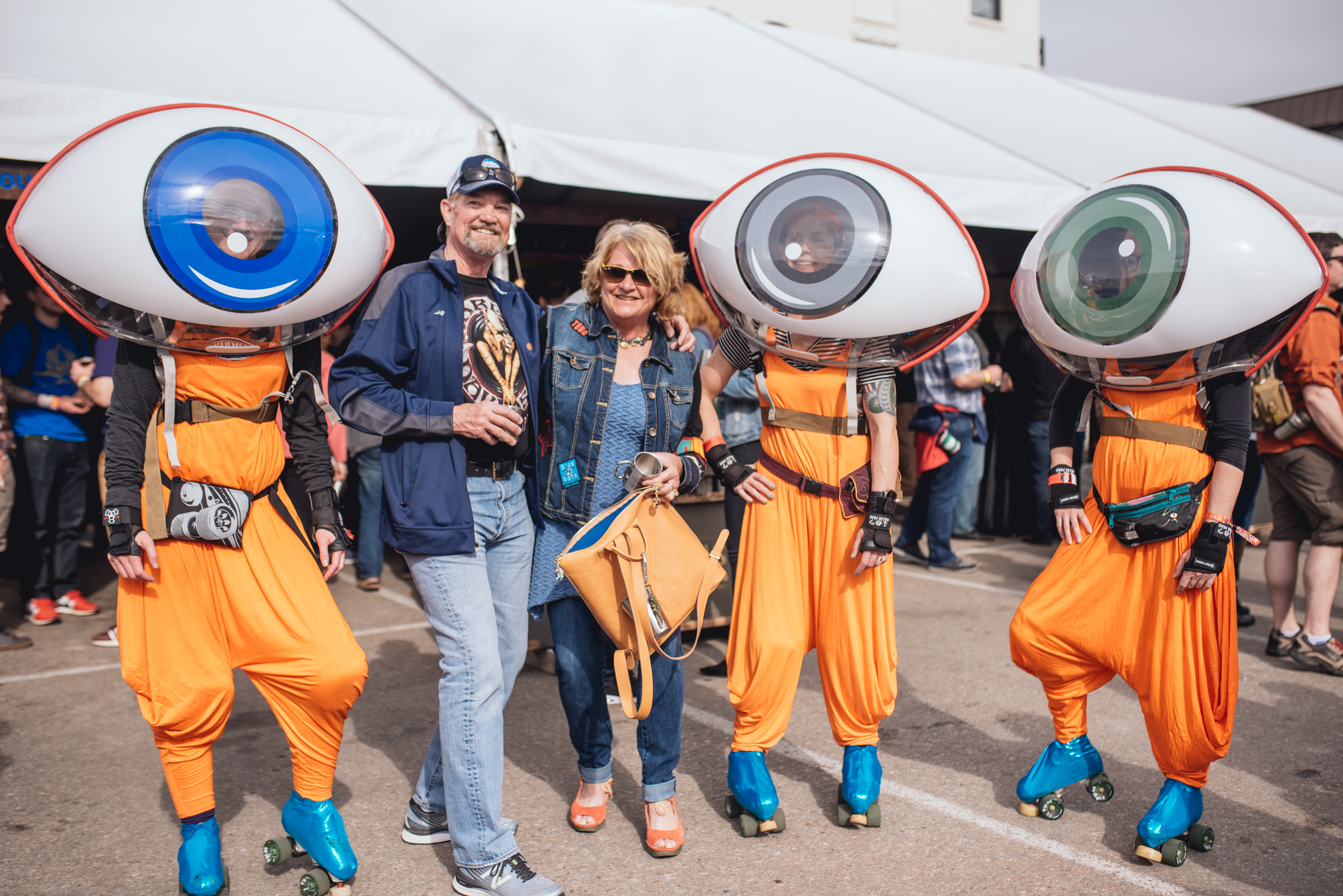
Surreal aspects at Treefort

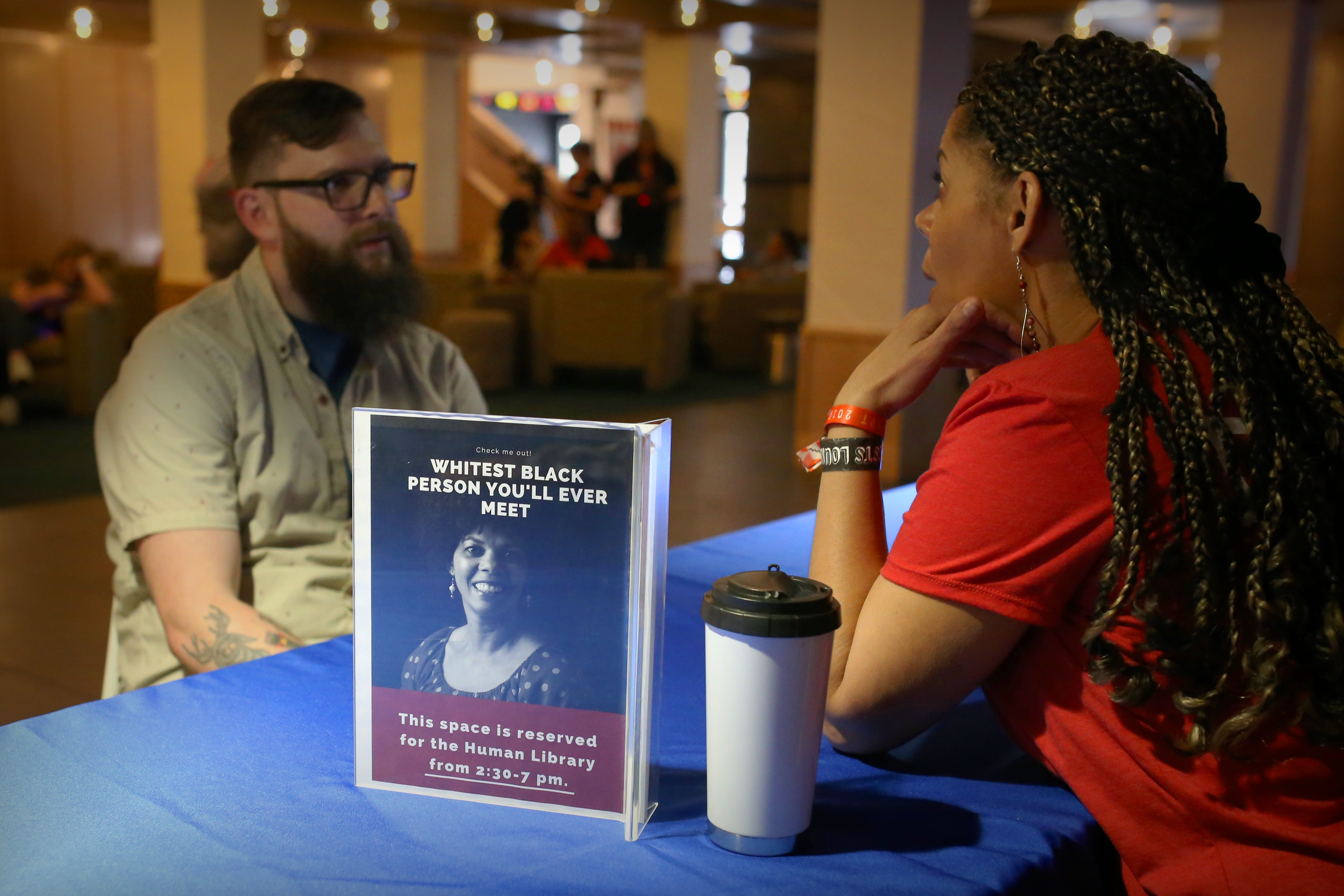
The Human Library, a walk-in interviewing project, here with "The Whitest Black Person You'll Ever Meet"

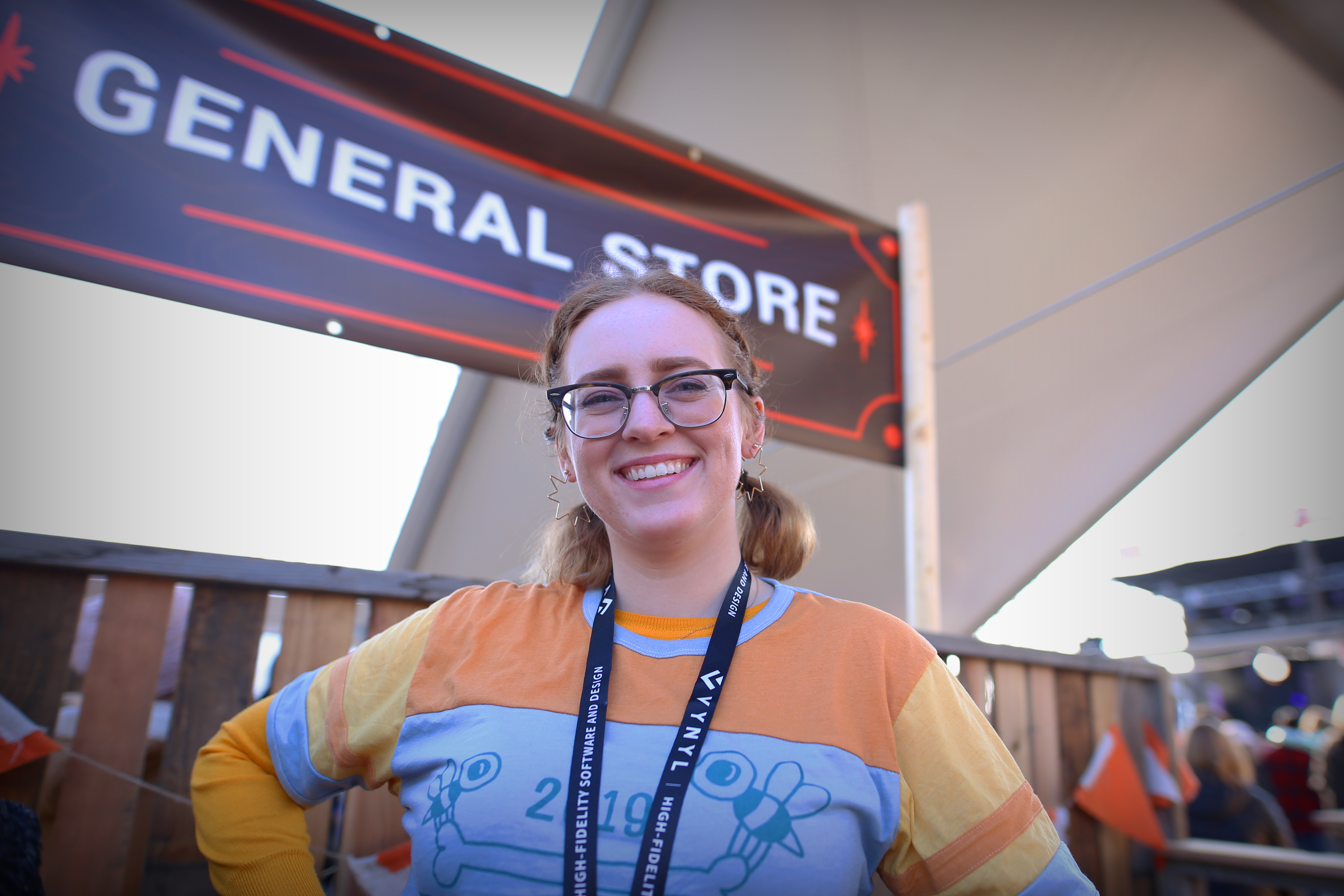
One of the more than 800 volunteers

== See also ==
- List of music festivals in Idaho
- Built To Spill
