= Freak Alley =

Public art venue in Boise, Idaho

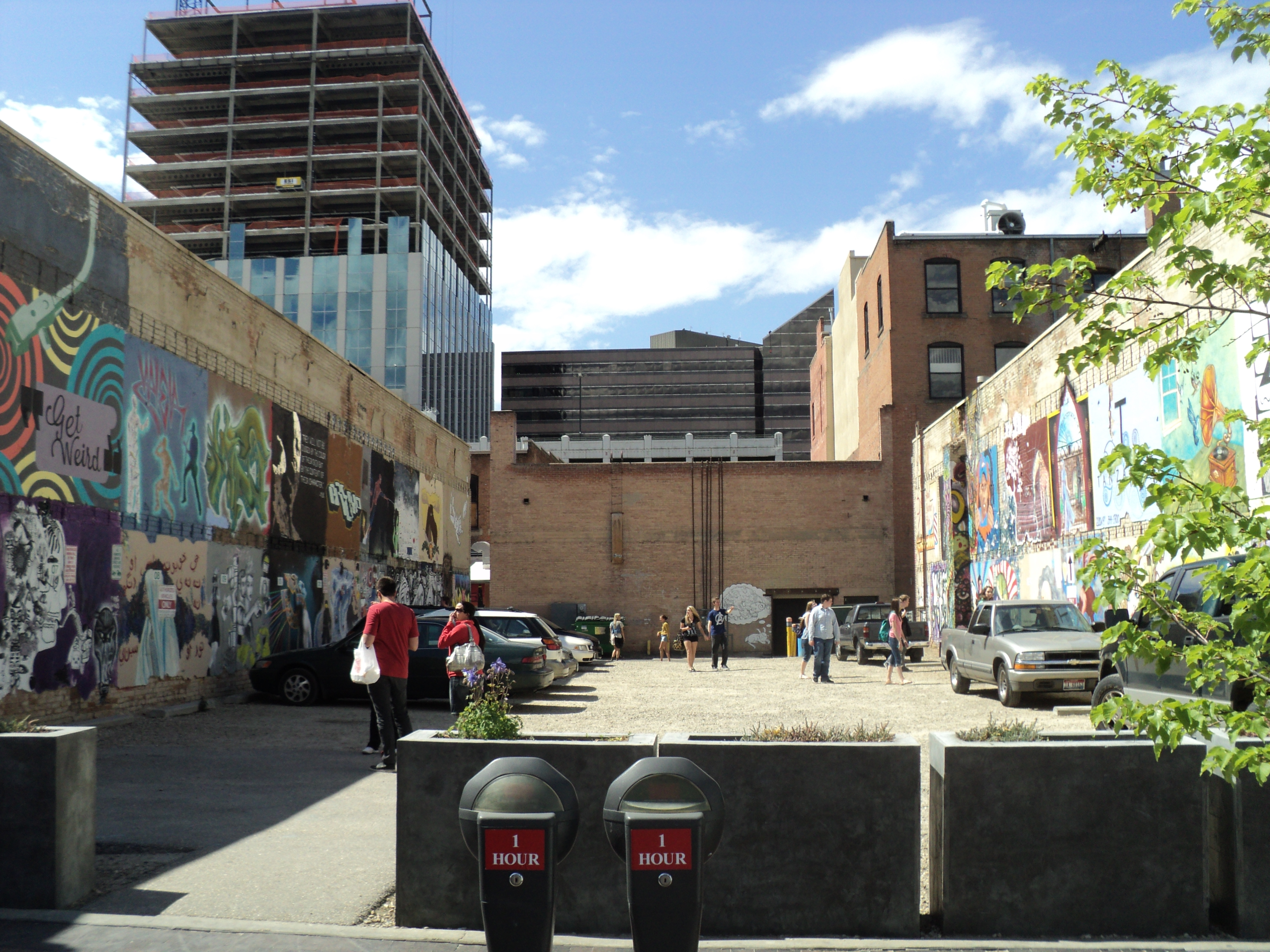
The Freak Alley parking lot, looking south from W. Bannock St.

Freak Alley is a venue for public art in the form of murals and graffiti located in and adjacent to a service alley in downtown Boise, Idaho. The largest outdoor gallery in the Northwest, and a Boise institution since 2002, it began with a painting of a single alley doorway and now extends from the alley itself to a gravel parking lot. Extant murals painted over and replaced by new murals (or incorporated into them) every two years; collectively it is the work of more than 200 artists. It has featured prominently in a survey of ten mid-sized American cities with thriving artistic communities in which Boise ranked second. The site, along with the back of the Union Block, received a $500,000 renovation in 2018 from the city.

== Gallery ==
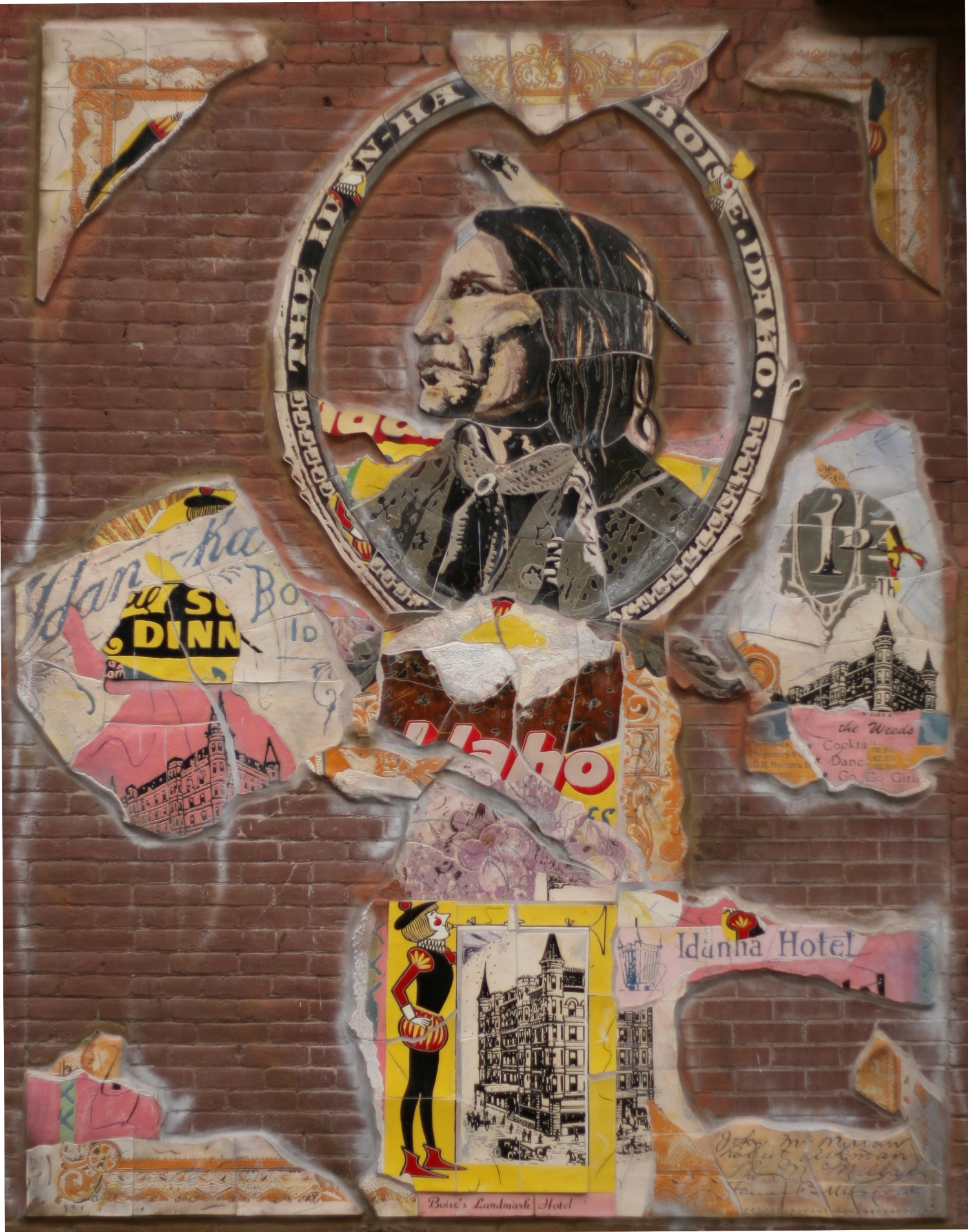
Spirit of Healing Waters

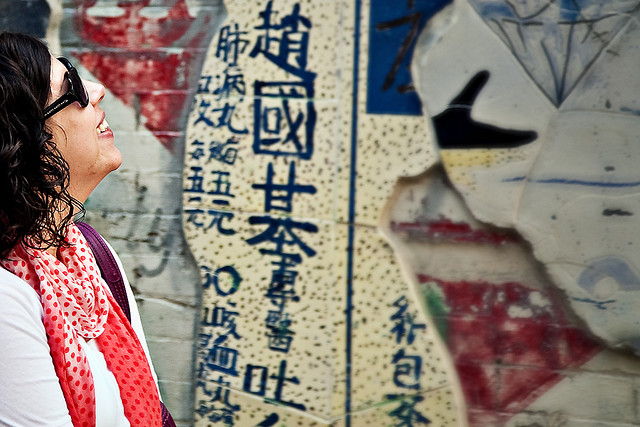
Chinese Ideograms

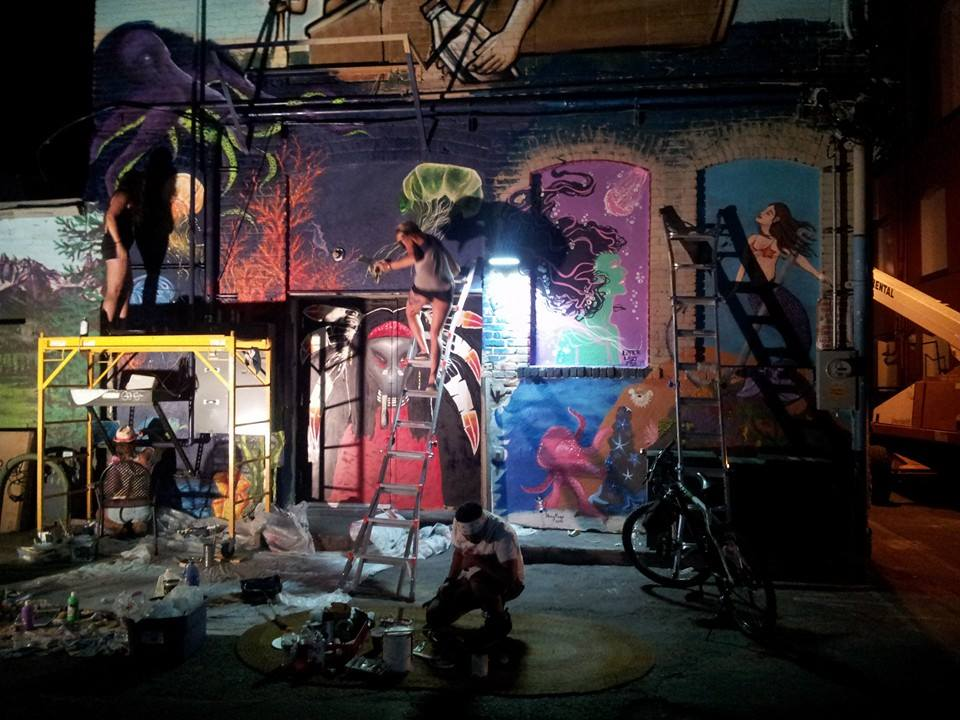
Several murals are painted over
