= Washington State Route 276 =

State highway in Whitman County, Washington, US

State Route 276
- Proposed SR 276 corridor from 2007 RDP

Route information
- Auxiliary route of SR 27
- History: Proposed since 1969; Codified from 1973 to 2016

Major junctions
- West end: US 195 near Pullman
- SR 27 near Pullman
- East end: SR 270 near Pullman

Location
- Country: United States
- State: Washington
- Counties: Whitman

Highway system
- State highways in Washington; Interstate; US; State; Scenic; Pre-1964; 1964 renumbering; Former
← SR 274	→ SR 278

State Route 276 (SR 276) was a legislated, but not constructed, state highway located in the U.S. state of Washington. The highway was meant to serve as a northern bypass of Pullman in Whitman County, traveling east from U.S. Route 195 (US 195) west of the city to SR 270 east of the city. Proposals were first drawn in 1969 for a complete ring road around Pullman, with the west side built and signed as US 195 in 1975. The northern segment of the ring road was codified in law in 1973 as SR 276, but was never constructed. In 2016, the highway was removed by the state legislature.

== Route description ==
SR 276 was legislated to begin at an intersection with US 195 west of Pullman in rural Whitman County. The highway would continue east through the Palouse as a divided limited-access highway, intersecting Brayton Road at an at-grade intersection and SR 27 at a diamond interchange. SR 276 would have turned southeast and intersect the future Coliseum Road at a diamond interchange before ending at SR 270 east of Pullman.

The highway was proposed primarily to relieve traffic on SR 27 and SR 270 through downtown Pullman, measured in surveys conducted by the Washington State Department of Transportation (WSDOT) using annual average daily traffic (AADT). WSDOT determined the intersection between SR 27 and SR 270 in downtown Pullman as the busiest highway in the region. SR 270 averaged 19,000 vehicles east of the intersection and SR 27 averaged 16,000 vehicles south of the intersection in 2011, while WSDOT predicted that average traffic could rise to 26,000 vehicles by 2025.

== History ==
A ring road around Pullman was first proposed by the Washington State Highway Commission in 1966 and surveyed in 1970. Right-of-way acquisition by WSDOT began in 1972 and the corridor was designated and codified into law as SR 276 the following year. 2.8 miles (4.51 km) of the ring road was completed west of the city as part of US 195 in 1974 while a public survey in 1975 recommended a southern bypass for SR 270 instead of SR 276. Several property owners along the proposed route of the bypass filed a lawsuit against the Washington State Highway Commission and argued the selected alignment would disturb wildlife. The Washington Supreme Court ruled in favor of the highway commission in January 1975.

The bypass project was canceled by 1978 and the WSDOT right-of-way was leased to farmers for agricultural purposes. The project was restarted with a transportation study from the Spokane Regional Council in 1993 and funded by the Pullman municipal government as part of their comprehensive plan. A route development plan in 2007, funded by WSDOT, recommended the construction of a 6.89-mile-long (11.09 km) divided limited-access highway with a single at-grade intersection at Brayton Road. WSDOT also allowed construction of a road crossing the protected right-of-way for the bypass.

In early 2016, a bill was introduced in the Washington State Legislature to decommission the unbuilt highway by removing its designation, primarily to facilitate the expansion of the Pullman–Moscow Regional Airport runway per an agreement signed four years earlier. The bill was passed out of the legislature and was signed by the Governor of Washington on April 1, 2016. The following year, the Pullman city government proposed the construction of a southerly bypass connecting US 195 to SR 270 near Mary's Park.
