= Palouse Scenic Byway =

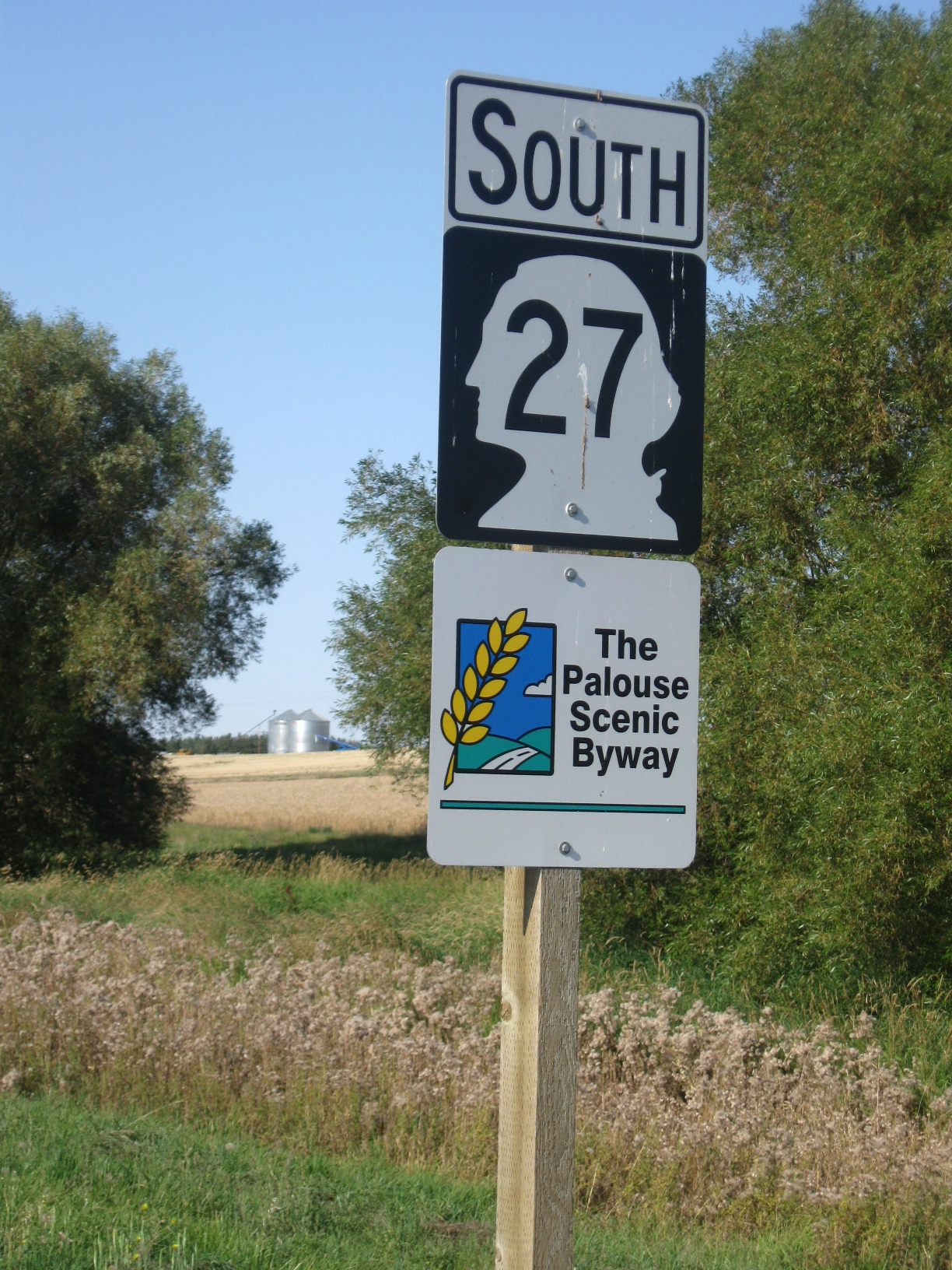
The highway shields of both the Palouse Scenic Byway and SR 27 near Tekoa

The Palouse Scenic Byway is a Washington State Scenic and Recreational Highway in Whitman County, Washington that follows seven different highways in the Palouse region:

- SR 26 from the Adams county line to Colfax;
- SR 27 from Pullman to Tekoa;
- SR 194 from Almota to Pullman;
- US 195 from the Idaho state line to Spokane county line;
- SR 271 from Oakesdale to Rosalia;
- SR 272 from Colfax to Palouse; and
- SR 278 from Rockford to Idaho state line

== History ==
The Palouse Scenic Byway was designated on April 17, 2003 on sections of SR 26, SR 27, US 195 and SR 271 in Whitman County. SR 278 was added to the byway in 2011.
