= Washington State Route 272 =

State highway in Whitman County, Washington, US

State Route 272

- SR 272 highlighted in red

Route information
- Auxiliary route of SR 27
- Maintained by WSDOT
- Length: 19.22 mi (30.93 km)
- Existed: 1964–present
- Tourist routes: Palouse Scenic Byway

Major junctions
- West end: US 195 in Colfax
- SR 27 in Palouse
- East end: SH-6 at Idaho state line near Palouse

Location
- Country: United States
- State: Washington
- Counties: Whitman

Highway system
- State highways in Washington; Interstate; US; State; Scenic; Pre-1964; 1964 renumbering; Former
← SR 271	→ SR 274

State Route 272 (SR 272) is a 19.22-mile (30.93 km) long state highway serving Whitman County in the U.S. state of Washington. The highway travels from U.S. Route 195 (US 195) in Colfax to a short concurrency with parent route SR 27 in Palouse before ending at the Idaho state line and becoming Idaho State Highway 6 (SH-6). Prior to 1964, the highway was split between Secondary State Highway 3F (SSH 3F) from Colfax to Palouse and a branch of Primary State Highway 3 (PSH 3) from Palouse to the Idaho state line.

== Route description ==
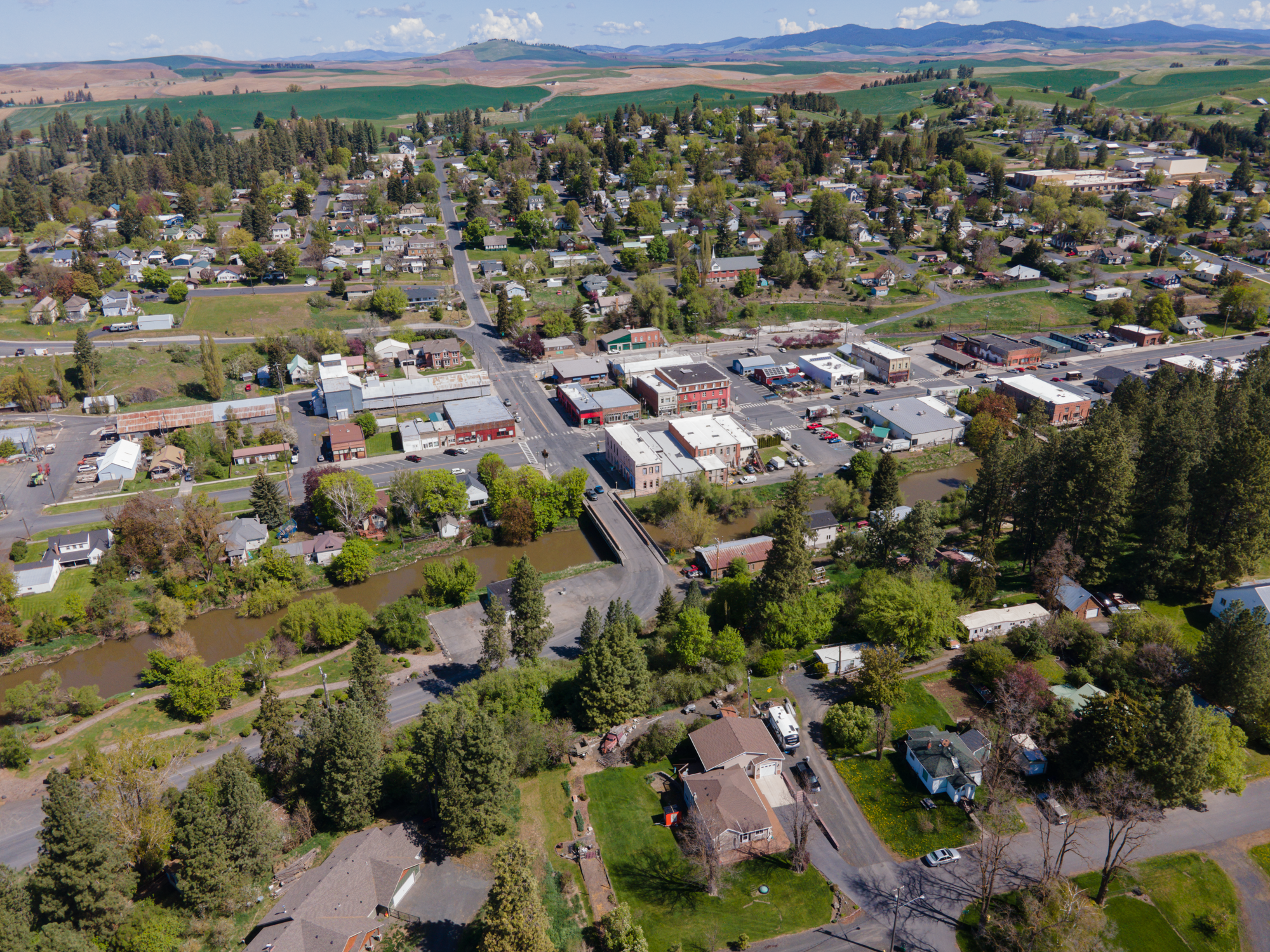
SR 272 passes through Palouse

SR 272 begins as Canyon Street in Colfax at an intersection with Main Street, signed as US 195. The highway passes Colfax Cemetery before leaving Colfax and traveling northeast along the Palouse River into farmland. SR 272 turns southeast into Palouse, crossing the Palouse River and becoming Church Street before an intersection with Division Street, signed as SR 27. The highway turns south and east onto Echanove Avenue concurrent with SR 27, crossing a Washington State Department of Transportation (WSDOT) rail lube before turning south onto Division Street and splitting off. SR 272 continues east as Main Street and leaves Palouse, traveling northeast over the WSDOT rail line towards the Idaho state line, where the highway becomes SH-6. SH-6 continues east for 5.711 miles (9.191 km) along the Palouse River towards Potlatch, Idaho.

Every year the WSDOT conducts a series of surveys on its highways in the state to measure traffic volume. This is expressed in terms of annual average daily traffic (AADT), which is a measure of traffic volume for any average day of the year. In 2011, WSDOT calculated that between 350 and 2,100 vehicles per day used the highway, mostly in Colfax and Palouse.

== History ==
A road connecting Colfax to Palouse and Potlatch, Idaho was first constructed in the early 20th century and appeared on a 1910 United States Geological Survey map of the Pullman area. The road, following the course of the Palouse River, was later paved between Palouse and Idaho and designated as a branch of PSH 3, while the gravel road between US 195 in Colfax and Palouse was signed as SSH 3F. SSH 3F was later paved in 1955, as the two highways merged to form SR 272 in the 1964 highway renumbering.

== Major intersections ==
The entire highway is in Whitman County.

Location	mi	km	Destinations	Notes
Colfax	0.00	0.00	US 195 (Main Street) – Spokane, Pullman	Western terminus
Palouse	16.52	26.59	SR 27 south (Division Street) – Pullman	West end of SR 272 overlap
Palouse	16.77	26.99	SR 27 north (Division Street) – Spokane	East end of SR 272 overlap
	19.22	30.93	SH-6 to US 95	Eastern terminus; Idaho state line
1.000 mi = 1.609 km; 1.000 km = 0.621 mi: Concurrency terminus
