= Washington State Route 27 =

State highway in eastern Washington, US

State Route 27
- SR 27 highlighted in red

Route information
- Maintained by WSDOT
- Length: 90.00 mi (144.84 km)
- Existed: 1964–present
- Tourist routes: Palouse Scenic Byway

Major junctions
- South end: US 195 near Pullman
- SR 270 in Pullman; SR 272 in Palouse; I-90 in Spokane Valley
- North end: SR 290 in Spokane Valley

Location
- Country: United States
- State: Washington
- Counties: Whitman, Spokane

Highway system
- State highways in Washington; Interstate; US; State; Scenic; Pre-1964; 1964 renumbering; Former
← SR 26	→ SR 28

State Route 27 (SR 27) is a 90-mile-long (145 km) state highway serving Whitman and Spokane counties, located in the eastern region of the U.S. state of Washington. The highway travels generally north from U.S. Route 195 (US 195) through Pullman, Palouse, Tekoa, and Spokane Valley to SR 290 north of an interchange with Interstate 90 (I-90). SR 27 serves the Palouse region as part of the Palouse Scenic Byway and travels between US 195 to the west and US 95 to the east in Idaho, with several auxiliary routes connecting to the two other highways.

The highway has been part of the state highway system since 1913, as a part of the Second Division of the Eastern Route of the Inland Empire Highway between Pullman and Oakesdale that later became a branch of Primary State Highway 3 (PSH 3), as well as Secondary State Highway 3H (SSH 3H) in 1937. Both highways were combined to form SR 27 during the 1964 highway renumbering and the designation was extended south to the US 195 bypass of Pullman in 1975 and north to SR 290 in 1991.

== Route description ==
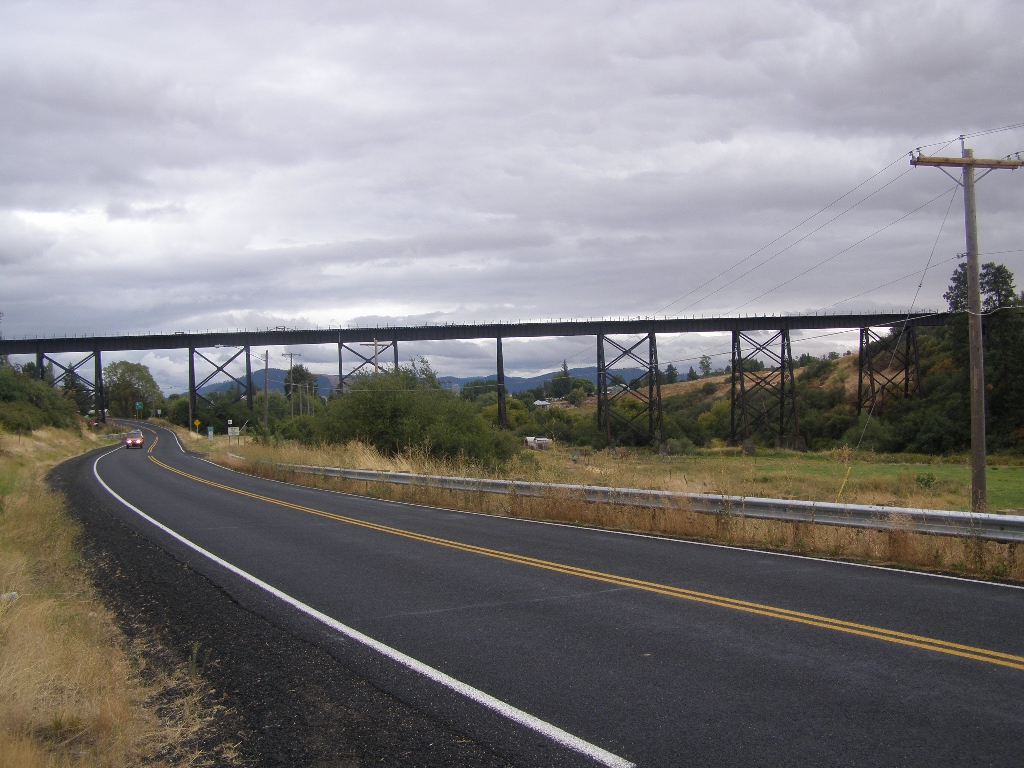
SR 27 southbound traveling into Tekoa under a trestle bridge carrying the John Wayne Pioneer Trail

SR 27 begins its 90-mile-long (145 km) route as Grand Avenue and part of the Palouse Scenic Byway at an intersection with US 195 south of Pullman. The highway travels through downtown Pullman and becomes concurrent with SR 270 as it passes west of the Washington State University main campus. Grand Avenue crosses the South Fork Palouse River and leaves the city of Pullman, parallel to a Washington State Department of Transportation (WSDOT) rail line as it travels into the Palouse. SR 27 travels northeast to the city of Palouse and crosses the Palouse River before a short concurrency with SR 272. The highway continues northwest alongside the WSDOT rail line through the town of Garfield and Oakesdale before serving as the southern terminus of SR 271 west of Oakesdale Airport. SR 27 travels northeast and crosses Hangman Creek into Tekoa as Crosby Street before it intersects SR 274, locally known as Poplar Street, at the north end of the city. The highway turns west onto Poplar Street and travels under a bridge carrying the John Wayne Pioneer Trail before leaving Tekoa and Whitman County for Spokane County.

SR 27 continues north along a Union Pacific rail line through Latah and Fairfield toward Rockford, where it serves as the western terminus of SR 278 and the Palouse Scenic Byway ends. The highway travels north out of the Palouse and to the Spokane Valley neighborhood of Opportunity, and widens to four lanes as Pines Road. SR 27 intersects I-90 in a diamond interchange that utilizes Indiana Avenue and Montgomery Drive as exit ramps. The highway continues north and crosses two rail lines, belonging to the Spokane International branch of Union Pacific and BNSF, before the designation ends at Trent Avenue, signed as SR 290.

Every year, WSDOT conducts a series of surveys on its highways in the state to measure traffic volume. This is expressed in terms of annual average daily traffic (AADT), which is a measure of traffic volume for any average day of the year. In 2011, WSDOT calculated that the busiest section of SR 27 was its interchange with I-90 in Spokane Valley, serving 27,000 vehicles, while the least busy section was between Tekoa and Latah, serving 640 vehicles.

== History ==
SR 27 was first codified as part of the Second Division of the Eastern Route of the Inland Empire Highway between Pullman and Oakesdale in 1913 and later became a paved branch of PSH 3 during the creation of the primary and secondary state highways in 1937. The branch route traveled 68.71 miles (110.58 km) north from US 195 at the Idaho state border through Pullman and Oakesdale to PSH 3 and US 195 south of Rosalia. SSH 3H was also established in 1937, traveling 38.69 miles (62.27 km) north from the PSH 3 branch in Oakesdale through the Palouse to PSH 2 and US 10 in Spokane Valley.

The two highways were combined to form SR 27 during the 1964 highway renumbering, part of a new state highway system still in place today. A western bypass of Pullman for US 195 was originally planned in the late 1960s and was opened in 1974 as part of a proposed ring road around the city. US 195 was routed onto the completed segment and SR 27 was extended south over its former route to intersect the new highway in 1975, while the rest of the bypass would become the un-built SR 276.

The highway was extended north within Spokane Valley from its interchange with I-90 to Trent Avenue, signed as SR 290, in 1991. The highway between Pullman and Tekoa was designated as part of the Palouse Scenic Byway on December 19, 2002, as part of the Washington State Scenic and Recreational Highways program. The scenic byway was extended north in 2011 to SR 278 in Rockford. A section of SR 27 near Spokane Valley was renamed the Sam Strahan Memorial Highway in 2017, honoring the lone victim of a school shooting at Freeman High School.

The northern terminus of SR 27 is planned to be rebuilt by the Spokane Valley government as part of a railroad grade separation project beginning in 2024. The rebuilt highway would travel under the BNSF Railway and curve east before reaching a roundabout with SR 290 adjacent to the Spokane River. It is expected to cost $40 million and will be primarily funded by federal and regional grants. The underpass was first proposed in the late 1990s but its funding lagged behind other grade separation projects in Spokane Valley.

== Major intersections ==
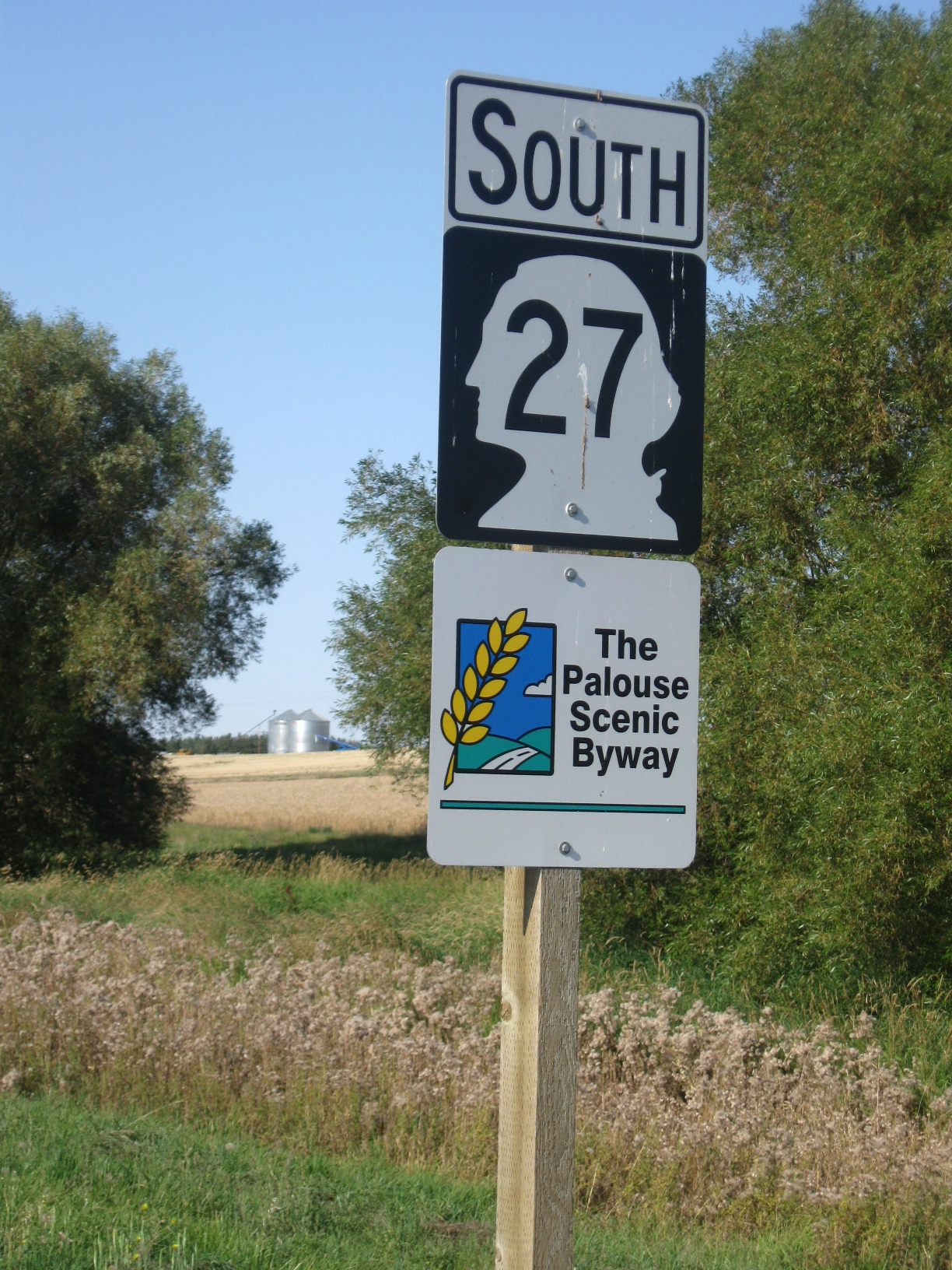
A reassurance shield on SR 27 south of Tekoa, designated as part of the Palouse Scenic Byway

County	Location	mi	km	Destinations	Notes
Whitman		0.00	0.00	US 195 – Lewiston, Spokane	Southern terminus
Whitman	Pullman	2.27	3.65	SR 270 east (Main Street) – WSU, Moscow	South end of SR 270 overlap
Whitman	Pullman	2.40	3.86	SR 270 west (Davis Way) to US 195 – Colfax, Spokane	North end of SR 270 overlap
Whitman	Palouse	17.37	27.95	SR 272 east (Main Street) to US 95	South end of SR 272 overlap
Whitman	Palouse	17.62	28.36	SR 272 west (Church Street) – Colfax	North end of SR 272 overlap
Whitman	Oakesdale	39.19	63.07	SR 271 north – Rosalia	Southern terminus of SR 271
Whitman	Tekoa	50.80	81.75	SR 274 east (Poplar Street) to US 95	Western terminus of SR 274
Spokane	Rockford	71.25	114.67	SR 278 east (Emma Street) to US 95 – Rockford	Western terminus of SR 278
Spokane	Spokane Valley	87.74	141.20	I-90 BL (Sprague Avenue)	
Spokane	Spokane Valley	88.84– 89.02	142.97– 143.26	I-90 – Spokane, Coeur d'Alene	
Spokane	Spokane Valley	90.00	144.84	SR 290 (Trent Avenue)	Northern terminus
1.000 mi = 1.609 km; 1.000 km = 0.621 mi: Concurrency terminus
