= Washington State Route 271 =

State highway in Whitman County, Washington, US

State Route 271

- Map of Whitman County in eastern Washington with SR 271 highlighted in red

Route information
- Auxiliary route of SR 27
- Maintained by WSDOT
- Length: 8.48 mi (13.65 km)
- Existed: 1964–present
- Tourist routes: Palouse Scenic Byway

Major junctions
- South end: SR 27 near Oakesdale
- North end: US 195 at Rosalia

Location
- Country: United States
- State: Washington
- Counties: Whitman

Highway system
- State highways in Washington; Interstate; US; State; Scenic; Pre-1964; 1964 renumbering; Former
← SR 270	→ SR 272

State Route 271 is a 8.48-mile (13.65 km) long state highway located entirely in Whitman County, Washington, Washington, United States. The highway begins at a y-intersection with SR 27 in the northern outskirts of Oakesdale north to an interchange with U.S. Route 195 (US 195) southeast of Rosalia. The highway listed as part of the Palouse Scenic Byway.

== Route description ==
SR 271 begins at a y-interchange with SR 27 in north Oakesdale, traveling northwest past the Oakesdale Cemetery. The highway traverses rolling wheat fields through rural Whitman County, crossing over McCoy and Pine Creeks. The highway parallels a single track, to the west of the highway, belonging to the Washington and Idaho Railway, crossing over the line roughly halfway to Rosalia. The rail line continues to parallel the highway after crossing it, just on the opposite side of the highway. SR 271 terminates at an interchange with US 195 southeast of Rosalia, however the roadway continues into the town as a county-maintained road. The entirety of the route has been named as part of the Palouse Scenic Byway.

Every year the Washington State Department of Transportation (WSDOT) conducts a series of surveys on its highways in the state to measure traffic volume. This is expressed in terms of annual average daily traffic (AADT), which is a measure of traffic volume for any average day of the year. In 2009, WSDOT calculated that between 650 and 740 cars travel along the highway on an average day.

== History ==
The rail line, originally belonging to the Northern Pacific Railway predates the road, and was in place since at least 1903. The first roadway to link the two cities first appeared on maps in 1912, and was named the eastern branch of the Inland Empire Highway by 1915. Between 1939 and the 1964 state highway renumbering, SR 271 was part of Primary State Highway 3.

== Major intersections ==
The entire route is in Whitman County.

Location	mi	km	Destinations	Notes
Oakesdale	0.00	0.00	SR 27 – Oakesdale, Tekoa	
	8.38– 8.48	13.49– 13.65	US 195 – Pullman, Spokane	Interchange; continues as Rosalia Road
1.000 mi = 1.609 km; 1.000 km = 0.621 mi
