= Washington State Route 274 =

State highway in Whitman County, Washington, US

State Route 274
- Poplar Street
- SR 274 highlighted in red

Route information
- Auxiliary route of SR 27
- Maintained by WSDOT
- Length: 1.92 mi (3.09 km)
- Existed: 1964–present

Major junctions
- West end: SR 27 in Tekoa
- East end: SH-60 at Idaho state line near Tekoa

Location
- Country: United States
- State: Washington
- Counties: Whitman

Highway system
- State highways in Washington; Interstate; US; State; Scenic; Pre-1964; 1964 renumbering; Former
← SR 272	→ SR 278

State Route 274 (SR 274) is a 1.92-mile-long (3.09 km) state highway serving Tekoa in Whitman County, located within the U.S. state of Washington. The highway, named Poplar Street, travels northeast from an intersection with SR 27 in Tekoa along Little Hangman Creek to the Idaho state line, becoming Idaho State Highway 60 (SH-60). SR 274 follows a rail line built in the early 20th century and was designated as a branch of Secondary State Highway 3H (SSH 3H) from 1937 until the 1964 highway renumbering.

== Route description ==
SR 274 begins its 1.92-mile-long (3.09 km) route at the intersection of Crosby Street and Poplar Street in Tekoa. SR 27 turns west at the intersection as SR 274 travels northeast as the 2-lane Poplar Street out of Tekoa, following the John Wayne Pioneer Trail to the north and the Little Hangman Creek to the south. The highway ends at the Idaho state line north of Willard Field. The roadway continues east as SH-60, traveling 5.510 miles (8.867 km) through the Coeur d'Alene Reservation in Benewah County to end at U.S. Route 95 (US-95).

Every year, the Washington State Department of Transportation (WSDOT) conducts a series of surveys on its highways in the state to measure traffic volume. This is expressed in terms of annual average daily traffic (AADT), which is a measure of traffic volume for any average day of the year. In 2011, WSDOT calculated that between 900 and 1,200 vehicles per day used the highway.

== History ==
SR 274 follows the route of an Oregon Railroad and Navigation Company line built in the 1890s between Tekoa and Plummer. A road was later built north of Little Hangman Creek and codified in 1937 as a branch of SSH 3H. During the 1964 highway renumbering, SSH 3H was renumbered to SR 27 and the branch became SR 274, codified in 1970. No major revisions to the route of the highway have occurred since the highway renumbering.

In August 2021, a section of U.S. Bicycle Route 40 was designated along SR 274 from Tekoa to the Idaho state line.

== Major intersections ==
The entire highway is in Whitman County.

Location	mi	km	Destinations	Notes
Tekoa	0.00	0.00	SR 27 – Spokane, Pullman	Western terminus
	1.92	3.09	SH-60 to US 95 – Coeur d'Alene Reservation	Eastern terminus; Idaho state border
1.000 mi = 1.609 km; 1.000 km = 0.621 mi
