= U.S. Route 195 =

U.S. Highway in Washington (state) and Idaho in the United States

U.S. Route 195
- US 195 highlighted in red and US 195 Spur in blue

Route information
- Auxiliary route of US 95
- Maintained by ITD and WSDOT
- Length: 94.02 mi (Note: Total mileage is the sum of the state mileages.) (151.31 km)
- Existed: November 11, 1926–present
- Tourist routes: Palouse Scenic Byway

Major junctions
- South end: US 95 near Lewiston, ID
- SR 27 near Pullman, WA; SR 26 in Colfax, WA; SR 23 in Steptoe, WA
- North end: I-90 / US 2 / US 395 in Spokane, WA

Location
- Country: United States
- States: Idaho, Washington
- Counties: ID: Nez Perce; WA: Whitman, Spokane

Highway system
- United States Numbered Highway System; List; Special; Divided
- Idaho State Highway System; Interstate; US; State
- State highways in Washington; Interstate; US; State; Scenic; Pre-1964; 1964 renumbering; Former
← SH-162	ID	→ SH-200
← SR 194	WA	→ US 197

U.S. Route 195 (US 195) is a north–south United States Highway, of which all but 0.65 miles of its 94.02 miles (1.05 of 151.95 km) are within the state of Washington. The highway starts in rural Idaho north of the city of Lewiston as a state highway in an interchange with US 95. As the road crosses into Washington it becomes a state highway that connects communities in the Palouse region of Eastern Washington. US 195 travels north, serving the cities of Pullman, Colfax and Rosalia in Whitman County before continuing into Spokane County to its terminus in the city of Spokane at an interchange with Interstate 90 (I-90).

The first section of US 195 designated as part of Washington's state highway system was codified in 1913 from Colfax to Spokane as the Inland Empire Highway and from the Idaho state line to Pullman as the Second Division of the Eastern Route of the Inland Empire Highway. The two highways were included as part of State Road 3 in 1923 and US 195 during the creation of the US Highway System on November 11, 1926. Originally, the northern terminus of the highway was at US 95 in Sandpoint, but was truncated to Spokane after US 2 was extended west from Bonners Ferry in 1946.

US 195 was cosigned with Primary State Highway 3 (PSH 3) from US 95 to Spokane and PSH 6 from Spokane to Newport from the creation of the primary and secondary state highways in 1937 until the 1964 highway renumbering. US 195 was extended south into Idaho after the relocation of US 95, designated as the North and South Highway in 1916, onto its present freeway in 1975. Bypasses of Pullman, Rosalia, and Plaza were completed during the early 1970s, converting portions of US 195 into a divided highway.

== Route description ==
US 195 runs 94.02 miles (151.31 km) in Idaho and Washington and is listed in its entirety as part of the National Highway System, a system of roads crucial to the nation's economy, defense and mobility. As a state highway in both states, the roadway is maintained by the Idaho Transportation Department (ITD) and Washington State Department of Transportation (WSDOT).

=== Idaho ===
US 195 travels within Idaho for 0.577 miles (0.929 km) from an interchange with US 95 to the Washington state line, entirely north of Lewiston atop the Lewiston Hill in unincorporated Nez Perce County. ITD surveys the roads under its control on a regular basis to measure the amount of traffic using the state's highways. These traffic counts are expressed in terms of annual average daily traffic (AADT), a calculation of the average daily number of vehicles on a segment of roadway. A July 2011 survey reported average daily traffic of 6,761 vehicles being served the US 95 interchange.

Administratively, US 195 does not exist in Idaho. According to ITD's milepoint log, the highway is officially a US 95 ramp into Washington state.

=== Washington ===
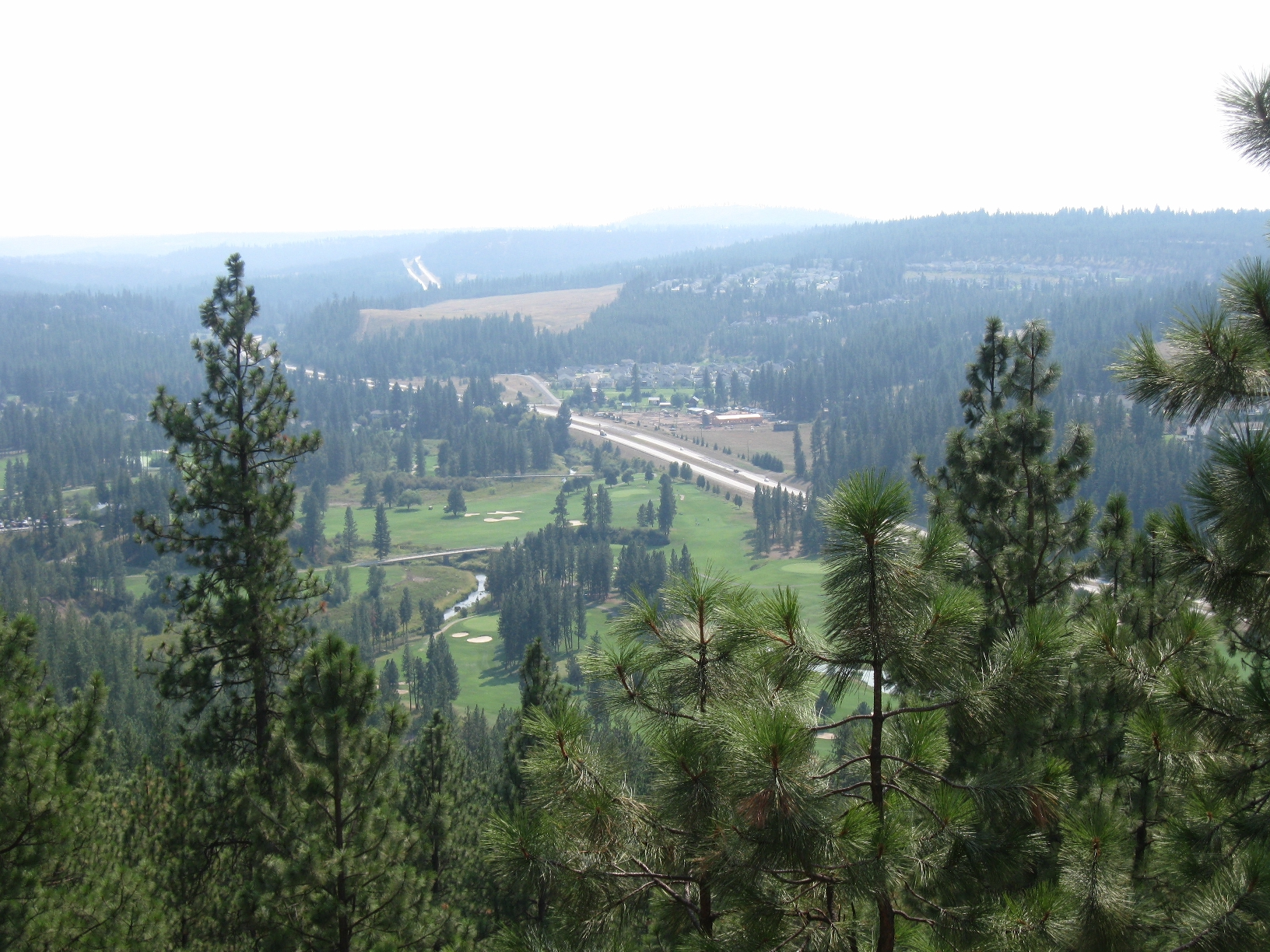
US 195 traveling along Hangman Creek in Spokane, viewed from the east

US 195 travels 93.37 miles (150.26 km) north through the Palouse region of Eastern Washington, from the Idaho state line north to Spokane. The highway serves as an important link between Pullman and Spokane as well as part of the Palouse Scenic Byway and a main north–south route in the region alongside State Route 27 (SR 27). US 195 enters Washington north of Clarkston in unincorporated Whitman County and travels west to an intersection with its 0.61-mile-long (0.98 km) spur route, providing a connection to US 95 northbound towards Moscow. The highway continues northwest through farmland and the towns of Uniontown and Colton along Union Flat Creek towards Pullman. US 195 intersects SR 27, also part of the Palouse Scenic Byway, and travels west of Pullman on a highway bypass of the city. The bypass travels through the termini of SR 194 and SR 270 as it leaves the Pullman area heading north towards Colfax along the South Fork Palouse River. US 195 becomes Main Street within Colfax and travels through the town along a WSDOT rail line to the eastern terminus of SR 272 and SR 26. The highway continues north along Pine Creek and the WSDOT rail line past the northern terminus of SR 271, a diamond interchange south of Rosalia, before leaving the Palouse Scenic Byway at the Spokane County border. The roadway heads north through a diamond interchange in Plaza and along Spangle Creek past the community of Spangle. US 195 enters the city of Spokane as a four-lane highway along Hangman Creek and ends at a partial cloverleaf interchange with I-90, cosigned with US 2 and US 395.

US 195 is defined by the Washington State Legislature as SR 195. Every year, WSDOT conducts a series of surveys on its highways in the state to measure traffic volume. This is expressed in terms of AADT, which is a measure of traffic volume for any average day of the year. In 2012, WSDOT calculated that the busiest section of US 195 within Washington was in Hangman Valley before the I-90 interchange in Spokane, serving 19,000 vehicles, while the least busiest section was between Pullman and Colfax, serving 3,100 vehicles. The entire route of US 195 is designated as a Highway of Statewide Significance by WSDOT, which includes highways that connect major communities in the state of Washington.

== History ==
The Inland Empire Highway was originally a collection of gravel county roads that have existed since 1898 in the Spokane area and 1905 in the Pullman area. These roads roughly followed an early territorial highway built in the 1870s between Colfax and Spokane. The highway was added to the state highway system in 1913, traveling within the Palouse region between Colfax and Spokane. The Second Division of the Eastern Route of the Inland Empire Highway was also established in 1913, traveling northwest from Sampson Trail Y at the Idaho–Washington state line to Pullman. The Idaho portion of US 195 became part of the North and South Highway in 1916 and was not numbered under Idaho's state highway system in 1953. The gap in the Second Division between Pullman and Colfax was named by Whitman County as a highway of importance the following year and was not built until 1925 as part of State Road 3. State Road 23, connecting Spokane to Newport, was designated in 1915 before it was renamed to the Pend O'Reille Highway and renumbered to State Road 6 in 1923. The Inland Empire Highway was numbered as State Road 3 in 1923 and retained the designation as PSH 3 in 1937, while State Road 6 became PSH 6.

Shields of US 195, circa 1961, and former PSH 3

The United States Highway System was established on November 11, 1926, during its adoption by the American Association of State Highway Officials (AASHO) and included US 195, traveling north from US 95 within Washington through Pullman and Spokane before ending at US 95 in Sandpoint, Idaho. The present four-lane divided highway along Hangman Creek in Spokane was constructed in 1939 as part of general improvements to Eastern Washington highways, relocating the route of the creek and a nearby Northern Pacific Railway line. The section of US 195 between Spokane and Sandpoint became co-signed with an extension of US 2 from Bonners Ferry, Idaho to Everett, Washington in 1946, and the highway was truncated to US 10 and US 395 in 1969. During the 1964 highway renumbering, Washington converted its highways to the present state route system, to take effect in 1970. US 195 replaced PSH 3 and its branches along its present route, with its southern terminus at US 95 atop Lewiston Hill in Idaho and its northern terminus at I-90 in Spokane at an interchange that was opened in December 1965, along with a new 7.2-mile (11.6 km) segment between Thornton and Rosalia.

Between 1973 and 1975, State Department of Highways completed construction of three highway bypasses around Pullman, Rosalia, and Plaza. Funds that were originally intended for the canceled Bay Freeway project in Seattle were instead redirected to the bypasses earlier in the decade. A four-lane bypass of Colfax was approved for construction in 1971, but deferred indefinitely due to a lack of funding. The western bypass of Pullman was completed in 1974 at a cost of $1.04 million.

US 95 was relocated onto its present freeway, bypassing Washington state, in 1977 and US 195 was extended south into Idaho to the new interchange with a spur route traveling towards northbound US 95. The highway between Uniontown and Rosalia was designated as part of the Palouse Scenic Byway on December 19, 2002, as part of the Washington State Scenic and Recreational Highways program. In 2002, WSDOT adopted a long range plan to upgrade US 195 within the Hangman Valley in Spokane to limited-access standards by constructing new interchanges at four intersections. One of the interchanges, at Cheney–Spokane Road, was completed in 2014 at a cost of $9.4 million. Funding for the remaining interchange projects, estimated to cost $106 million in 2002 dollars, was not allocated and WSDOT is instead considering lower-cost improvements to the intersections. Increased traffic congestion on US 195 in Spokane lead to a development moratorium in place until capacity improvements are made to the highway. The first ramp meter in the Spokane area was installed at US 195's interchange with I-90 in 2019.

== Major junctions ==
State	County	Location	mi (Note: Milepost numbers reset at the Idaho–Washington state line crossing.)	km	Destinations	Notes
Idaho	Nez Perce		0.000	0.000	US 95 south	Interchange; southern terminus
			0.653 0.00	1.051 0.00	Idaho–Washington state line	
Washington	Whitman		0.37	0.60	Genesee Spur (US 195 Spur) to US 95 north – Moscow	US 195 Spur unsigned; former US 95 north
Washington	Whitman		20.26	32.61	SR 27 north – Pullman	
Washington	Whitman		22.00	35.41	SR 194 west – Almota	
Washington	Whitman		22.75	36.61	SR 270 east – Pullman	
Washington	Whitman	Colfax	35.95	57.86	SR 272 east (Canyon Street) – Palouse	
Washington	Whitman	Colfax	36.62	58.93	SR 26 Spur to SR 26 west – Vantage	
Washington	Whitman	Colfax	36.72	59.10	SR 26 west – Vantage	
Washington	Whitman	Steptoe	46.13	74.24	SR 23 north – St. John, Sprague	
Washington	Whitman		60.78	97.82	SR 271 south – Rosalia, Oakesdale	Interchange
Washington	Spokane	Plaza	68.71	110.58	Cheney–Plaza Road	Interchange
Washington	Spokane	Spokane	91.26	146.87	Cheney–Spokane Road	Interchange
Washington	Spokane	Spokane	93.37	150.26	I-90 / US 2 / US 395 – Spokane Airport, Seattle, Spokane	Northern terminus
1.000 mi = 1.609 km; 1.000 km = 0.621 mi

== Spur route ==
U.S. Route 195 Spur
- Location: Near Washington–Idaho state line
- Length: 0.54 mi (870 m)
- Existed: 1979–present

US 195 has a 0.54-mile-long (870 m) spur route near its southern terminus on the Washington–Idaho state line that travels east from US 195 to serve US 95 northbound atop Lewiston Hill. The unsigned highway, also known as the Genesee Spur, was established in 1979 on the former alignment of US 95 as it passed briefly through Washington before it was moved onto its present alignment. WSDOT included the road in its annual AADT survey in 2012 and calculated that 100 vehicles per day used the spur route. ITD designates the spur route as US-95 Spur in their milepoint log.

=== Major intersections ===
The entire route is in Whitman County.

Location	mi	km	Destinations	Notes
	0.00	0.00	US 195 (Palouse Scenic Byway) – Pullman, Uniontown	Southern terminus; US 195 south is former US 95 south
Washington–Idaho state line	0.54	0.87	US 95 Spur north – Moscow	Continuation into Idaho; former US-95 north
1.000 mi = 1.609 km; 1.000 km = 0.621 mi: Route transition
