= Washington State Route 270 =

State highway in Whitman County, Washington, US

State Route 270
- Map of the Pullman area with SR 270 highlighted in red

Route information
- Auxiliary route of SR 27
- Maintained by WSDOT
- Length: 9.89 mi (15.92 km)
- Existed: 1964–present

Major junctions
- West end: US 195 in Pullman
- SR 27 in Pullman
- East end: SH-8 near Moscow, ID

Location
- Country: United States
- State: Washington
- Counties: Whitman

Highway system
- State highways in Washington; Interstate; US; State; Scenic; Pre-1964; 1964 renumbering; Former
← SR 263	→ SR 271

State Route 270 (SR 270) is a state highway in Whitman County, Washington, United States. It connects the city of Pullman to U.S. Route 195 (US 195) at its west end and Idaho State Highway 8 near Moscow, Idaho, at its east end. The 10-mile-long (16 km) highway is one of the main roads in Pullman and connects the campuses of Washington State University and the University of Idaho.

== Route description ==
SR 270 begins at an un-signalized Y intersection with US 195 in the hills west of Pullman. The two-lane highway travels east through a cut in the hills on Davis Way and passes several residential subdivisions on the outskirts of the city. After descending from a hill and following the South Fork Palouse River and a freight railroad into downtown Pullman, SR 270 turns southeast and begins a short concurrency with its parent route, SR 27, on Grand Avenue. The two highways travel south on Grand Avenue for a two blocks before SR 270 turns east onto a pair of one-way streets: Southeast Paradise Street for eastbound traffic and East Main Street for westbound traffic.

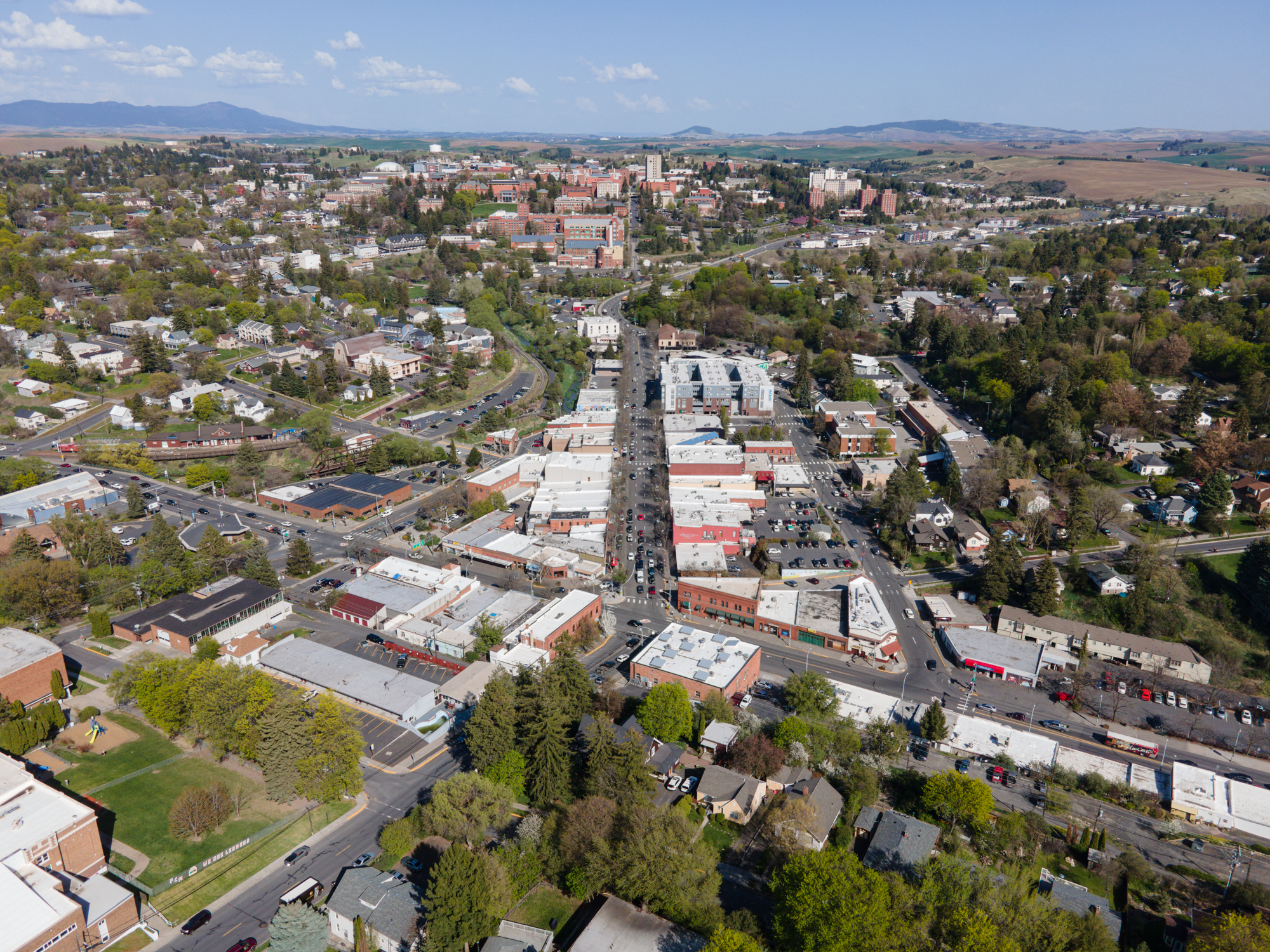
Aerial view of downtown Pullman with SR 270 at the center

The two streets carrying SR 270 reunite after three blocks and the highway continues east on the four-lane Main Street towards the Washington State University campus. The highway turns southeast and bypasses the campus, crossing over the river and railroad and passing several student dormitories. After intersecting Bishop Boulevard, SR 270 turns due east onto the Pullman–Moscow Highway, which follows Paradise Creek along the south side of the university campus. The highway is joined by the Bill Chipman Palouse Trail, a paved multi-use trail that runs along the south side of the creek. A decommissioned railroad grade, the Chipman Trail was dedicated in April 1998.

After passing the university arboretum and a road leading to Pullman–Moscow Regional Airport, SR 270 turns northeast and leaves Pullman city limits. The highway enters a predominantly agricultural area with several quarries and farms that make up much of the Palouse region. SR 270 then dips southeasterly after intersecting the airport access road again and rejoins the freight railroad before it reaches the Idaho state line at the western city limits of Moscow. The road becomes Idaho State Highway 8, which continues through a commercial district and the University of Idaho campus to a junction with US 95 in downtown Moscow.

SR 270 is maintained by the Washington State Department of Transportation (WSDOT), which conducts an annual survey on state highways to measure traffic volume in terms of annual average daily traffic. Average traffic volumes on the highway in 2016 ranged from a minimum of 4,100 vehicles near its western terminus at US 195 to a maximum of 21,000 vehicles in downtown Pullman. Most of the highway between Pullman and Moscow is five lanes wide, with two lanes of traffic in each direction and a center turn lane. The entire route of SR 270 is designated as part of the National Highway System, a national network of roads identified as important to the national economy, defense, and mobility, and is listed as a Highway of Statewide Significance by the state legislature.

== History ==
The first railroad in the Pullman area, built by the Oregon Railroad and Navigation Company in 1885, traveled west towards Colfax and east along Paradise Creek to Moscow, Idaho. A parallel railroad was also built to the south by the Northern Pacific Railway in 1887, along with an unpaved highway running between the two towns near Paradise Creek. The original road between Pullman and Moscow was impassible during inclement weather for automobiles, leading to calls for a permanent highway.

The original road, today's "Old Moscow-Pullman Road", was completed as a gravel road in 1929 after three months of construction. In 1933, $125,000 was appropriated to construct a new route for the highway, which was still in the planning stages in 1950. Prior to the state highway renumbering in 1964, SR 270 was a spur of Primary State Highway 3.

East of the city limits, the highway was targeted for widening for decades. A plan was announced by WSDOT in 2001, prompted by a fatal crash that killed three WSU students, with a 60-foot (18 m) median between directions of traffic. It was expanded to four lanes in October 2007, with ground broken in June 2006. The original design of a 60-foot (18 m) center median, similar to a rural interstate highway, was revised due to right-of-way costs.

The project added lanes from just east of SE Bishop Blvd to the Idaho state line, improving SR 270 to a four-lane arterial from its junction with SR 27 (Grand Avenue) to the Pullman city limits and a four-lane divided highway to the state line. A paved median lane was added, separating opposing traffic; in places, it is a two-way left turn lane to provide safe access to adjacent property. Safety was listed as a main concern for the improvements. A highly publicized triple-fatality collision occurred in 2001; it likely hastened the long-standing project's revival and completion.

Sections of the highway in downtown Pullman were reconfigured in 2020 to add more parking spaces, a protected bicycle lane, and sidewalk space. A five-block section of Main Street, which carries eastbound traffic, was closed in April 2024 for a six-month project to replace subsurface utility lines and permanently reconfigure the street to be more pedestrian-friendly.

== Major intersections ==
The entire highway is in Whitman County.

Location	mi	km	Destinations	Notes
	0.00	0.00	US 195 – Colfax, Spokane, Lewiston	
Pullman	2.27	3.65	SR 27 north (Grand Avenue) – WSU, Palouse	West end of SR 27 overlap
Pullman	2.40	3.86	SR 27 south (Grand Avenue) to US 195 – Lewiston	East end of SR 27 overlap
	9.89	15.92	SH-8 east to US 95 – Moscow	Idaho state line
1.000 mi = 1.609 km; 1.000 km = 0.621 mi: Concurrency terminus
