= Tekoa, Washington =

- City
- City of Tekoa
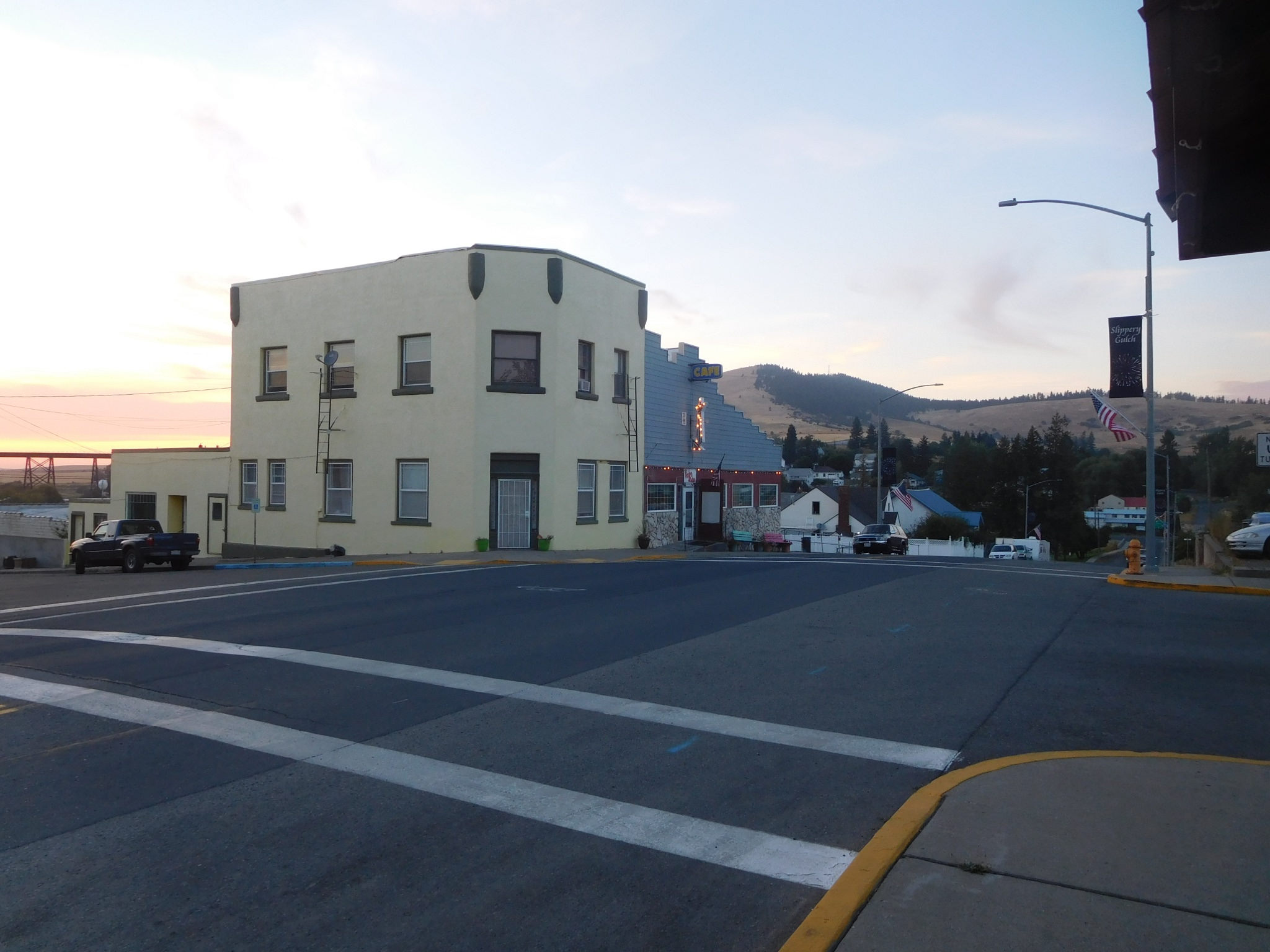

- Location of Tekoa, Washington
- Coordinates: 47°13′29″N 117°04′23″W
- Country: United States
- State: Washington
- County: Whitman

Government
  - Type: Mayor–council
  - Mayor: Roy Schulz

Area
  - Total: 1.23 sq mi (3.18 km^{2})
  - Land: 1.23 sq mi (3.18 km^{2})
  - Water: 0 sq mi (0.00 km^{2})
- Elevation: 2,520 ft (770 m)

Population (2020)
  - Total: 817
  - Density: 665/sq mi (257/km^{2})
- Time zone: UTC-8 (Pacific (PST))
  - Summer (DST): UTC-7 (PDT)
- ZIP code: 99033
- Area code: 509
- FIPS code: 53-70560
- GNIS feature ID: 2412043
- Website: www.tekoawa.com

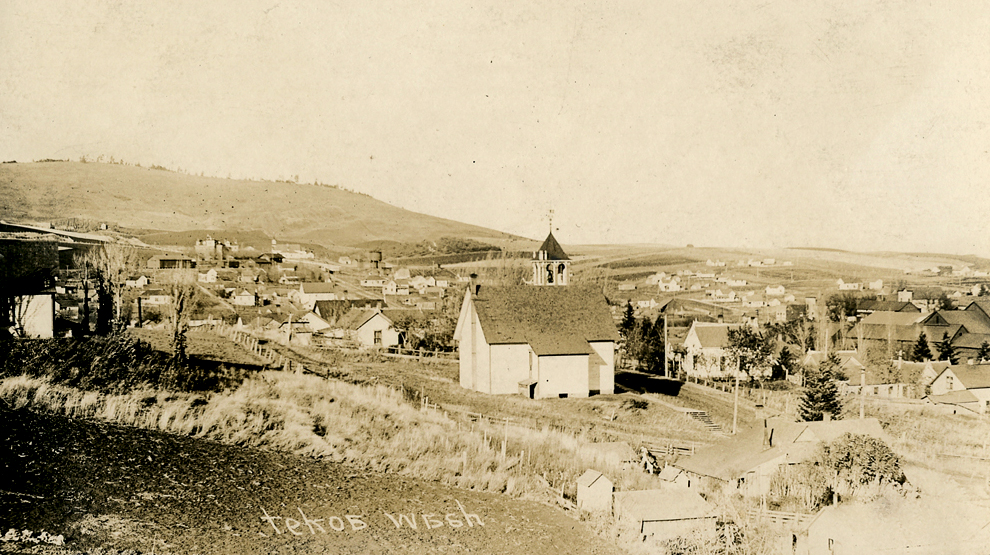
Tekoa in 1915

Tekoa (/ˈtikoʊ/ TEE-koh) is a rural city in Whitman County, Washington, United States. The population was 817 at the 2020 census.

Based on per capita income, one of the more reliable measures of affluence, Tekoa ranks 420th of 522 areas in the state of Washington to be ranked.

The city is centered in the rolling fields of the Palouse region and served by State Route 27. It features the landmark Milwaukee Road trestle, which now carries the Palouse to Cascades State Park Trail, and the historic Empire Theatre, an Art Deco theater built in 1940 that was later restored.

Every June, the city of Tekoa holds their annual celebration, the Slippery Gulch Festival, featuring a parade, egg toss, and fireworks.

== History ==
The area that includes the present-day city of Tekoa was settled by the Coeur d'Alene people. In 1886, David A. Huffman and George T. Huffman settled there. The townsite was platted in 1888 and was named after the Biblical town.

Tekoa was incorporated in 1889 with just under 300 people at the base of Tekoa Mountain (elevation 2,490 feet), on the extreme eastern end of the Palouse, and to the west of the Benewah Range of Idaho. In 1908 the railroad trestle above the city was built. By 1910 the population had grown to 1,694. Over the next 60 years, Tekoa began a population decline as mechanized farming reduced the need for workers, and railway was abandoned. By 1990 the city had fewer than 750 residents, but during the 1990s the population rose to 826 at the 2000 census.

== Geography ==
According to the United States Census Bureau, the city has a total area of 1.14 square miles (2.95 km^{2}), all of it land.

Tekoa is located at the confluence where Little Hangman Creek enters Latah Creek.

=== Climate ===
This region experiences warm (but not hot) and dry summers, with no average monthly temperatures above 71.6 °F. According to the Köppen Climate Classification system, Tekoa has a warm-summer Mediterranean climate, abbreviated "Csb" on climate maps.

== Demographics ==
Historical population
Census	Pop.	Note	%±
1890	301		—
1900	717		138.2%
1910	1,694		136.3%
1920	1,520		−10.3%
1930	1,408		−7.4%
1940	1,383		−1.8%
1950	1,189		−14.0%
1960	911		−23.4%
1970	808		−11.3%
1980	854		5.7%
1990	750		−12.2%
2000	826		10.1%
2010	778		−5.8%
2020	817		5.0%
U.S. Decennial Census

=== 2020 census ===
As of the 2020 census, Tekoa had a population of 817, a median age of 51.3 years, and 21.7% of residents under the age of 18; 28.9% were 65 years of age or older, and there were 94.5 males for every 100 females (93.4 males for every 100 females age 18 and over).

0.0% of residents lived in urban areas, while 100.0% lived in rural areas.

There were 321 households in Tekoa, of which 23.4% had children under the age of 18 living in them, 46.7% were married-couple households, 20.2% were households with a male householder and no spouse or partner present, and 27.4% were households with a female householder and no spouse or partner present; 33.4% of households were made up of individuals and 14.6% had someone living alone who was 65 years of age or older.

There were 366 housing units, of which 12.3% were vacant. The homeowner vacancy rate was 4.8% and the rental vacancy rate was 6.9%.

Racial composition as of the 2020 census
Race	Number	Percent
White	733	89.7%
Black or African American	2	0.2%
American Indian and Alaska Native	16	2.0%
Asian	2	0.2%
Native Hawaiian and Other Pacific Islander	1	0.1%
Some other race	9	1.1%
Two or more races	54	6.6%
Hispanic or Latino (of any race)	34	4.2%

=== 2010 census ===
At the 2010 census, the city population comprised 778 persons, 307 households, and 191 families. The population density was 682.5 inhabitants per square mile (263.5/km^{2}). There were 360 housing units at an average density of 315.8 per square mile (121.9/km^{2}). The racial makeup of the city was 92.0% White, 0.1% African American, 3.3% Native American, 0.5% Asian, 0.1% Pacific Islander, 2.3% from other races, and 1.5% from two or more races. Hispanic or Latino of any race were 5.8% of the population.

Of the 307 households 30.9% had children under the age of 18 living with them, 49.5% were married couples living together, 10.1% had a female householder with no husband present, 2.6% had a male householder with no wife present, and 37.8% were non-families. 32.9% of households were one person and 16.3% were one person aged 65 or older. The average household size was 2.36 and the average family size was 3.03.

The median age was 44.4 years. 25.2% of residents were under the age of 18; 5.3% were between the ages of 18 and 24; 20.7% were from 25 to 44; 25.9% were from 45 to 64; and 23% were 65 or older. The gender makeup of the city was 47.0% male and 53.0% female.

=== 2000 census ===
At the 2000 census, there were 826 people in 318 households, including 220 families, in the city. The population density was 727.2 people per square mile (279.8/km^{2}). There were 363 housing units at an average density of 319.6 per square mile (122.9/km^{2}). The racial makeup of the city was 93.46% White, 0.36% African American, 2.18% Native American, 0.85% Asian, 0.12% Pacific Islander, 0.12% from other races, and 2.91% from two or more races. Hispanic or Latino of any race were 1.57% of the population.

Of the 318 households 30.5% had children under the age of 18 living with them, 56.3% were married couples living together, 10.7% had a female householder with no husband present, and 30.8% were non-families. 29.2% of households were one person and 15.1% were one person aged 65 or older. The average household size was 2.43 and the average family size was 2.98.

In the city the age distribution of the population shows 27.7% under the age of 18, 4.4% from 18 to 24, 20.5% from 25 to 44, 24.7% from 45 to 64, and 22.8% 65 or older. The median age was 42 years. For every 100 females there were 84.8 males. For every 100 females age 18 and over, there were 86.6 males.

The median household income was $30,833 and the median family income was $36,771. Males had a median income of $32,014 versus $19,307 for females. The per capita income for the city was $14,344. About 13.2% of families and 14.5% of the population were below the poverty line, including 20.5% of those under age 18 and 10.1% of those age 65 or over.

== Notable people ==
- Mildred Bailey, popular 1930s jazz singer, was born in Tekoa.
- Oliver L. Barrett (1892–1943), sculptor and educator
- Al Rinker, singer and former partner of Bing Crosby in the Rhythm Boys
- Susannah Scaroni, Paralympic athlete.
