= Whitman County, Washington =

County in Washington, United States

- County
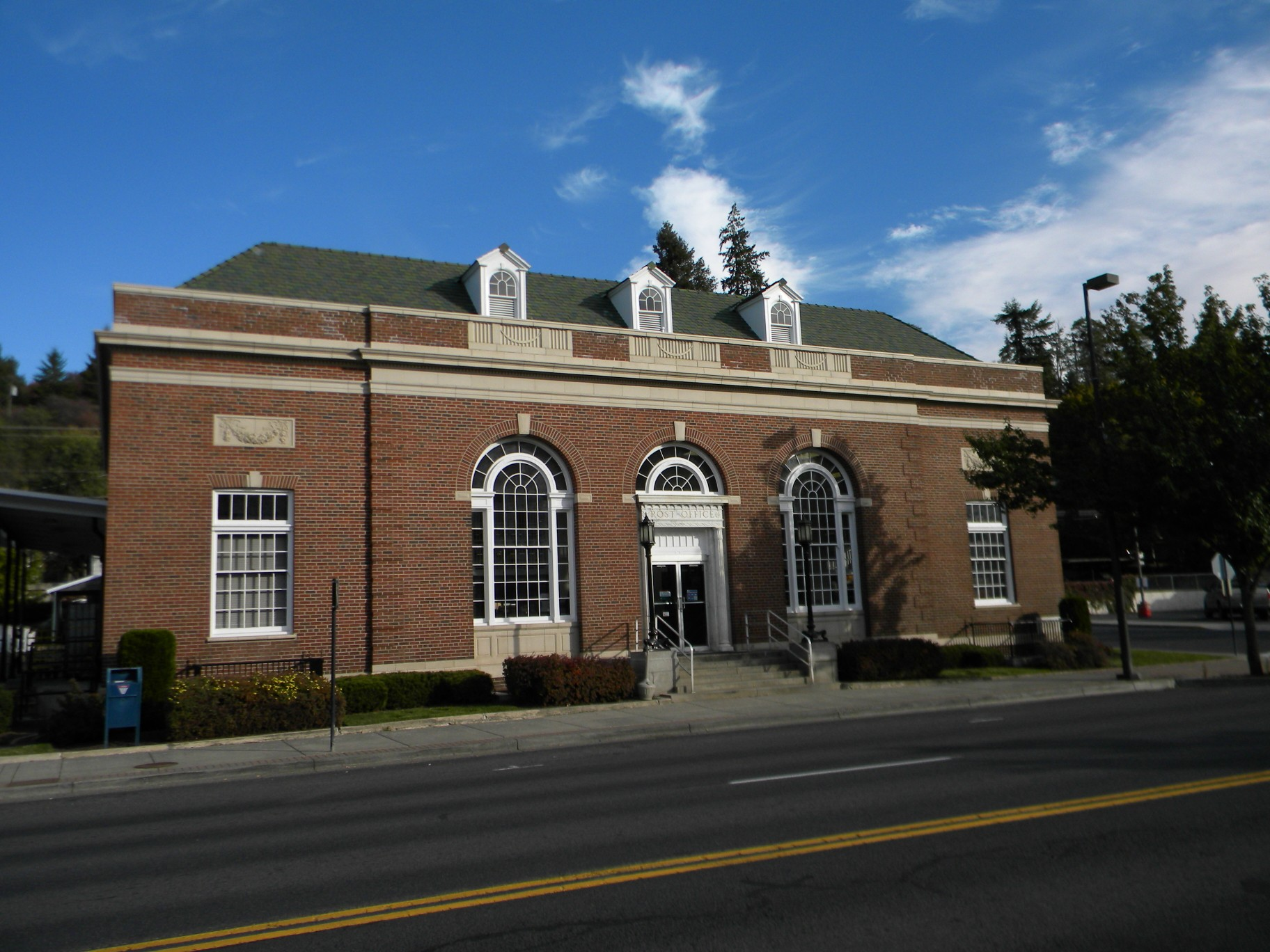
- Colfax Post Office

- Location within the U.S. state of Washington
- Coordinates: 46°53′N 117°31′W
- Country: United States
- State: Washington
- Founded: November 29, 1871
- Named for: Marcus Whitman
- Seat: Colfax
- Largest city: Pullman

Area
  - Total: 2,178 sq mi (5,640 km^{2})
  - Land: 2,159 sq mi (5,590 km^{2})
  - Water: 19 sq mi (49 km^{2}) 0.9%

Population (2020)
  - Total: 47,973
  - Estimate (2025): 48,512 ▲
  - Density: 22/sq mi (8.5/km^{2})
- Time zone: UTC−8 (Pacific)
  - Summer (DST): UTC−7 (PDT)
- Congressional district: 5th
- Website: www.whitmancounty.gov

Whitman County is a county located in the U.S. state of Washington. As of the 2020 census, the population was 47,973. The county seat is Colfax, and its largest city is Pullman.

The county was formed from Stevens County in 1871. It is named after Marcus Whitman, a Presbyterian missionary who, with his wife Narcissa, was killed in 1847 by members of the Cayuse tribe.

Whitman County comprises the Pullman, Washington Metropolitan Statistical Area.

== History ==
The area delineated by the future Washington state boundary began to be colonized at the start of the nineteenth century, both by Americans and Canadians. However, the majority of Canadian exploration and interest in the land was due to the fur trade, whereas American settlers were principally seeking land for agriculture and cattle raising. The Treaty of 1818 provided for dual control of this area by US and Canadian government officials. During this period, the future Washington Territory was divided into two administrative zones: Clark County and Lewis County (made official in 1845).

The dual-control concept was unwieldy and led to continual argument, and occasional conflict. The status of the Washington area was settled in 1846, when the Oregon Treaty ceded the land south of North latitude 49 degrees to American control.

In 1854, Skamania County was split from the original Clark County. Also in 1854, Walla Walla County was split from the new Skamania County. In 1863, Stevens County was split from Walla Walla County, and in 1871, a portion of Stevens County was set off to form Whitman County. The 1871 shape of Whitman County was considerably larger than its present boundary, as Adams, Franklin, and Lincoln counties were sectioned off from Whitman County in 1883. After that, Whitman County retained its shape, including through the period after Washington became the 42nd state of the Union in 1889.

== Geography ==
According to the United States Census Bureau, the county has a total area of 2,178 square miles (5,640 km^{2}), of which 2,159 square miles (5,590 km^{2}) is land and 19 square miles (49 km^{2}) (0.9%) is water. Whitman County is part of the Palouse, a wide and rolling prairie-like region of the middle Columbia basin.

=== Rivers ===
- Snake River
- Palouse River
  - Latah Creek
  - Union Flat Creek
  - Rock Creek
  - Pine Creek

=== Lakes and reservoirs ===
- Lake Herbert G. West, formed from Lower Monumental Dam
- Lake Bryan, named for Dr. Enoch A. Bryan, behind the Little Goose Dam
- Lower Granite Lake, behind the Lower Granite Dam
- Rock Lake

=== Summits and peaks ===
- Tekoa Mountain (elevation: 4009')
- Kamiak Butte (elevation: 3641')
- Steptoe Butte (elevation: 3612')
- Bald Butte (elevation: 3369)

=== Notable parks ===
- Steptoe Butte State Park
- Kamiak Butte County Park
- Palouse Falls State Park
- Central Ferry State Park
- Boyer Park and Marina
- Wawawai County Park

=== Adjacent counties ===
- Spokane County - north
- Benewah County, Idaho - northeast
- Latah County, Idaho - east
- Nez Perce County, Idaho - southeast
- Asotin County - south/southeast
- Garfield County - south
- Columbia County - south
- Franklin County - southwest
- Adams County - west
- Lincoln County - northwest

=== Major highways ===
- U.S. Route 195
- State Route 23
- State Route 26
- State Route 27
- State Route 127
- State Route 270
- State Route 271
- State Route 272

=== Airports ===
- Pullman–Moscow Regional Airport: Airport with GA operations and a few airline flights with Alaska Airlines
- Port of Whitman Business Air Center Airport: Small GA Airport in Colfax

== Demographics ==
Historical population
| Census | Pop. | Note | %± |
|---|---|---|---|
| 1880 | 7,014 | | — |
| 1890 | 19,109 | | 172.4% |
| 1900 | 25,360 | | 32.7% |
| 1910 | 33,280 | | 31.2% |
| 1920 | 31,323 | | −5.9% |
| 1930 | 28,014 | | −10.6% |
| 1940 | 27,221 | | −2.8% |
| 1950 | 32,469 | | 19.3% |
| 1960 | 31,263 | | −3.7% |
| 1970 | 37,900 | | 21.2% |
| 1980 | 40,103 | | 5.8% |
| 1990 | 38,775 | | −3.3% |
| 2000 | 40,740 | | 5.1% |
| 2010 | 44,776 | | 9.9% |
| 2020 | 47,973 | | 7.1% |
| 2025 (est.) | 48,512 | ▲ | 1.1% |
U.S. Decennial Census; 1790–1960 1900–1990; 1990–2000 2010–2020

=== 2020 census ===
As of the 2020 census, the county had a population of 47,973. Of the residents, 15.5% were under the age of 18 and 11.9% were 65 years of age or older; the median age was 25.6 years. For every 100 females there were 99.1 males, and for every 100 females age 18 and over there were 98.2 males. 68.1% of residents lived in urban areas and 31.9% lived in rural areas.

Whitman County, Washington – Racial and ethnic composition Note: the US Census treats Hispanic/Latino as an ethnic category. This table excludes Latinos from the racial categories and assigns them to a separate category. Hispanics/Latinos may be of any race.
| Race / Ethnicity (NH = Non-Hispanic) | Pop 2000 | Pop 2010 | Pop 2020 | % 2000 | % 2010 | % 2020 |
|---|---|---|---|---|---|---|
| White alone (NH) | 35,317 | 36,760 | 35,557 | 86.69% | 82.10% | 74.12% |
| Black or African American alone (NH) | 613 | 721 | 1,163 | 1.50% | 1.61% | 2.42% |
| Native American or Alaska Native alone (NH) | 280 | 272 | 266 | 0.69% | 0.61% | 0.55% |
| Asian alone (NH) | 2,247 | 3,449 | 3,616 | 5.52% | 7.70% | 7.54% |
| Pacific Islander alone (NH) | 106 | 99 | 139 | 0.26% | 0.22% | 0.29% |
| Other race alone (NH) | 47 | 42 | 258 | 0.12% | 0.09% | 0.54% |
| Mixed race or Multiracial (NH) | 911 | 1,393 | 2,922 | 2.24% | 3.11% | 6.09% |
| Hispanic or Latino (any race) | 1,219 | 2,040 | 4,052 | 2.99% | 4.56% | 8.45% |
| Total | 40,740 | 44,776 | 47,973 | 100.00% | 100.00% | 100.00% |

The racial makeup of the county was 76.3% White, 2.5% Black or African American, 0.7% American Indian and Alaska Native, 7.6% Asian, 0.3% Native Hawaiian and Pacific Islander, 3.1% from some other race, and 9.5% from two or more races. Hispanic or Latino residents of any race comprised 8.4% of the population.

There were 18,650 households in the county, of which 21.5% had children under the age of 18 living with them and 28.6% had a female householder with no spouse or partner present. About 35.0% of all households were made up of individuals and 8.5% had someone living alone who was 65 years of age or older.

There were 20,922 housing units, of which 10.9% were vacant. Among occupied housing units, 44.8% were owner-occupied and 55.2% were renter-occupied. The homeowner vacancy rate was 1.7% and the rental vacancy rate was 8.3%.

=== 2010 census ===
As of the 2010 census, there were 44,776 people, 17,468 households, and 8,130 families living in the county. The population density was 20.7 people per square mile (8.0 people/km^{2}). There were 19,323 housing units at an average density of 8.9 units per square mile (3.4 units/km^{2}). The racial makeup of the county was 84.6% white, 7.8% Asian, 1.7% black or African American, 0.7% American Indian, 0.2% Pacific islander, 1.4% from other races, and 3.6% from two or more races. Those of Hispanic or Latino origin made up 4.6% of the population. In terms of ancestry, 29.4% were German, 14.5% were English, 13.4% were Irish, 7.1% were Norwegian, and 4.1% were American.

Of the 17,468 households, 20.8% had children under the age of 18 living with them, 38.4% were married couples living together, 5.4% had a female householder with no husband present, 53.5% were non-families, and 32.7% of all households were made up of individuals. The average household size was 2.22 and the average family size was 2.86. The median age was 24.4 years.

The median income for a household in the county was $36,368 and the median income for a family was $61,598. Males had a median income of $46,663 versus $34,496 for females. The per capita income for the county was $19,506. About 10.7% of families and 27.6% of the population were below the poverty line, including 13.3% of those under age 18 and 5.7% of those age 65 or over.

=== 2000 census ===
As of the 2000 census, there were 40,740 people, 15,257 households, and 8,055 families living in the county. The population density was 19 people per square mile (7.3 people/km^{2}). There were 16,676 housing units at an average density of 8 units per square mile (3.1 units/km^{2}). The racial makeup of the county was 88.07% White, 1.53% Black or African American, 0.73% Native American, 5.55% Asian, 0.27% Pacific Islander, 1.22% from other races, and 2.63% from two or more races. 2.99% of the population were Hispanic or Latino of any race. 21.9% were of German, 9.8% English, 8.6% Irish, 8.3% United States or American and 6.6% Norwegian ancestry.

There were 15,257 households, out of which 24.60% had children under the age of 18 living with them, 44.20% were married couples living together, 6.20% had a female householder with no husband present, and 47.20% were non-families. 29.40% of all households were made up of individuals, and 7.10% had someone living alone who was 65 years of age or older. The average household size was 2.31 and the average family size was 2.91.

In the county, the population was spread out, with 18.10% under the age of 18, 32.60% from 18 to 24, 24.00% from 25 to 44, 16.00% from 45 to 64, and 9.20% who were 65 years of age or older. The median age was 25 years. For every 100 females there were 102.50 males. For every 100 females age 18 and over, there were 101.90 males.

The median income for a household in the county was $28,584, and the median income for a family was $44,830. Males had a median income of $33,381 versus $27,046 for females. The per capita income for the county was $15,298. About 11.00% of families and 25.60% of the population were below the poverty line, including 16.50% of those under age 18 and 5.50% of those age 65 or over.

== Politics ==
Despite the county historically voting for Republicans, Whitman County has a reputation as being far more socially liberal than other counties in Eastern Washington due to the presence of Washington State University in Pullman. It is part of Washington's 5th congressional district and is represented by Republican Michael Baumgartner. Quite conservative, rural Whitman was one of only three counties in the state to be won by Barry Goldwater in 1964. Richard Nixon, Ronald Reagan, Bill Clinton, and George W. Bush each won the county twice.

In 2008, Barack Obama received 51.57% of the Whitman County vote. In 2012, he received 46.9% of the vote, with Mitt Romney winning with a 49.7% plurality. Whitman was the only county in eastern Washington to approve same-sex marriage via Referendum 74. It was the only county to vote in favor of Referendum 74 while voting for the Republican candidate for president. Whitman County voters also approved marijuana legalization via Initiative 502.

By 2016, the county was considered Democratic in regard to federal elections. Hillary Clinton won the county in 2016 and also voted for Patty Murray in 2016. However, Republican Bill Bryant won this county over incumbent Democrat Jay Inslee by a percentage point in the concurrent gubernatorial election. In the 2020 elections, the majority of the county voted for Democrat Joe Biden for president and re-elected Inslee for governor. Both received majority of the county vote with Inslee becoming the first Democratic gubernatorial candidate to win a county in Eastern Washington since Gary Locke in 2000. However, the county still votes Republican in U.S. House elections.

In 2020, 52.9% of residents voted for Biden while 42.9% voted for Trump, a 10% margin for Biden.

The county was one of two in Eastern Washington to vote for 2018 Washington Initiative 1639, which strengthened gun laws, along with neighboring Spokane County.

United States presidential election results for Whitman County, Washington
| Year | Republican | | Democratic | | Third party(ies) | |
| Year | No. | % | No. | % | No. | % |
|---|---|---|---|---|---|---|
| 1892 | 2,131 | 37.33% | 2,061 | 36.10% | 1,517 | 26.57% |
| 1896 | 1,592 | 29.66% | 3,690 | 68.75% | 85 | 1.58% |
| 1900 | 2,366 | 42.52% | 2,826 | 50.78% | 373 | 6.70% |
| 1904 | 4,090 | 66.48% | 1,519 | 24.69% | 543 | 8.83% |
| 1908 | 3,376 | 52.60% | 2,386 | 37.18% | 656 | 10.22% |
| 1912 | 1,989 | 20.00% | 3,621 | 36.42% | 4,333 | 43.58% |
| 1916 | 4,933 | 43.84% | 5,888 | 52.33% | 430 | 3.82% |
| 1920 | 6,344 | 64.68% | 2,806 | 28.61% | 659 | 6.72% |
| 1924 | 4,960 | 52.12% | 1,745 | 18.34% | 2,811 | 29.54% |
| 1928 | 7,065 | 69.94% | 2,969 | 29.39% | 67 | 0.66% |
| 1932 | 4,727 | 42.93% | 5,945 | 53.99% | 339 | 3.08% |
| 1936 | 3,955 | 33.03% | 7,753 | 64.75% | 265 | 2.21% |
| 1940 | 6,356 | 49.66% | 6,351 | 49.62% | 92 | 0.72% |
| 1944 | 6,000 | 52.22% | 5,449 | 47.42% | 41 | 0.36% |
| 1948 | 6,411 | 50.32% | 6,015 | 47.21% | 314 | 2.46% |
| 1952 | 8,905 | 65.67% | 4,611 | 34.00% | 44 | 0.32% |
| 1956 | 8,572 | 63.81% | 4,854 | 36.13% | 8 | 0.06% |
| 1960 | 8,069 | 59.58% | 5,458 | 40.30% | 17 | 0.13% |
| 1964 | 6,765 | 49.97% | 6,760 | 49.93% | 13 | 0.10% |
| 1968 | 7,810 | 56.64% | 5,218 | 37.84% | 761 | 5.52% |
| 1972 | 9,548 | 58.70% | 6,248 | 38.41% | 470 | 2.89% |
| 1976 | 8,168 | 54.21% | 6,197 | 41.13% | 703 | 4.67% |
| 1980 | 8,636 | 50.73% | 5,726 | 33.63% | 2,662 | 15.64% |
| 1984 | 10,021 | 59.48% | 6,621 | 39.30% | 207 | 1.23% |
| 1988 | 7,680 | 50.09% | 7,403 | 48.28% | 250 | 1.63% |
| 1992 | 6,428 | 36.78% | 7,637 | 43.69% | 3,413 | 19.53% |
| 1996 | 6,734 | 42.37% | 7,262 | 45.69% | 1,899 | 11.95% |
| 2000 | 9,003 | 55.45% | 6,509 | 40.09% | 725 | 4.47% |
| 2004 | 9,397 | 52.17% | 8,287 | 46.01% | 328 | 1.82% |
| 2008 | 8,104 | 46.07% | 9,070 | 51.57% | 415 | 2.36% |
| 2012 | 8,507 | 49.69% | 8,037 | 46.94% | 577 | 3.37% |
| 2016 | 7,403 | 41.06% | 8,146 | 45.19% | 2,479 | 13.75% |
| 2020 | 9,067 | 42.92% | 11,184 | 52.94% | 875 | 4.14% |
| 2024 | 8,699 | 43.44% | 10,480 | 52.33% | 848 | 4.23% |

== Economy ==
Whitman County has highly productive agriculture. According to Heart of Washington, Whitman County produces more barley, wheat, dry peas, and lentils than any other county in the United States.

The county is also home to Schweitzer Engineering Laboratories in Pullman.

== Education ==
Pullman is home to Washington State University, the state's land-grant university.

School districts in the county include:

- Cheney School District
- Clarkston School District
- Colfax School District
- Colton School District
- Endicott School District
- Garfield School District
- LaCrosse School District
- Lamont School District
- Oakesdale School District
- Palouse School District
- Pullman School District
- Rosalia School District
- St. John School District
- Steptoe School District
- Tekoa School District
- Washtucna School District

== Communities ==
=== Cities ===
- Pullman

=== Towns ===
- Albion
- Colfax (county seat)
- Colton
- Endicott
- Farmington
- Garfield
- LaCrosse
- Lamont
- Malden
- Oakesdale
- Palouse
- Rosalia
- Saint John
- Tekoa
- Uniontown

=== Census-designated place ===
- Steptoe

=== Unincorporated communities ===
- Belmont
- Diamond
- Dusty
- Ewan
- Hay
- Hooper
- Johnson
- Thornton
- Winona

=== Ghost town ===
- Elberton

== Gallery ==
=== Communities ===
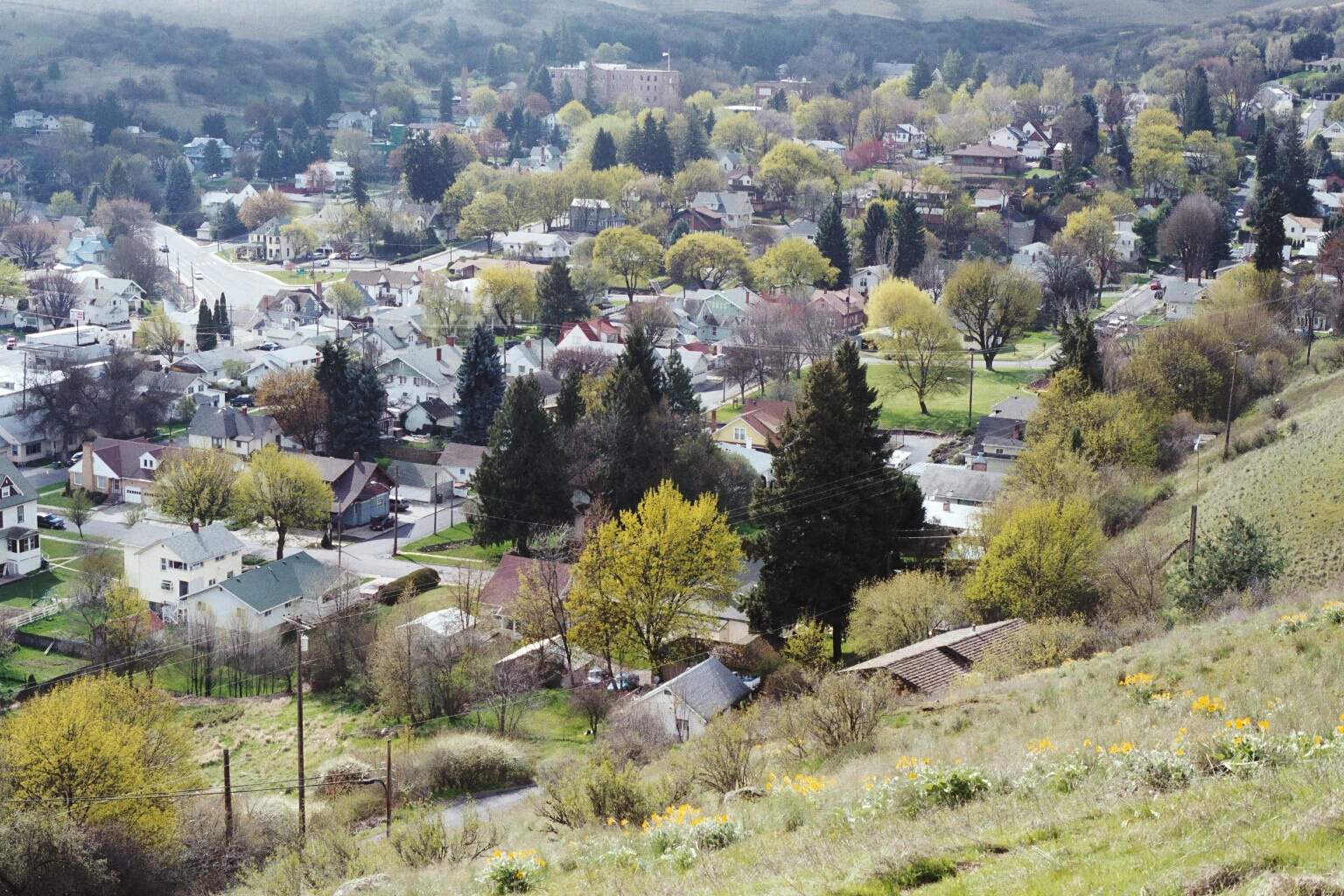
Colfax

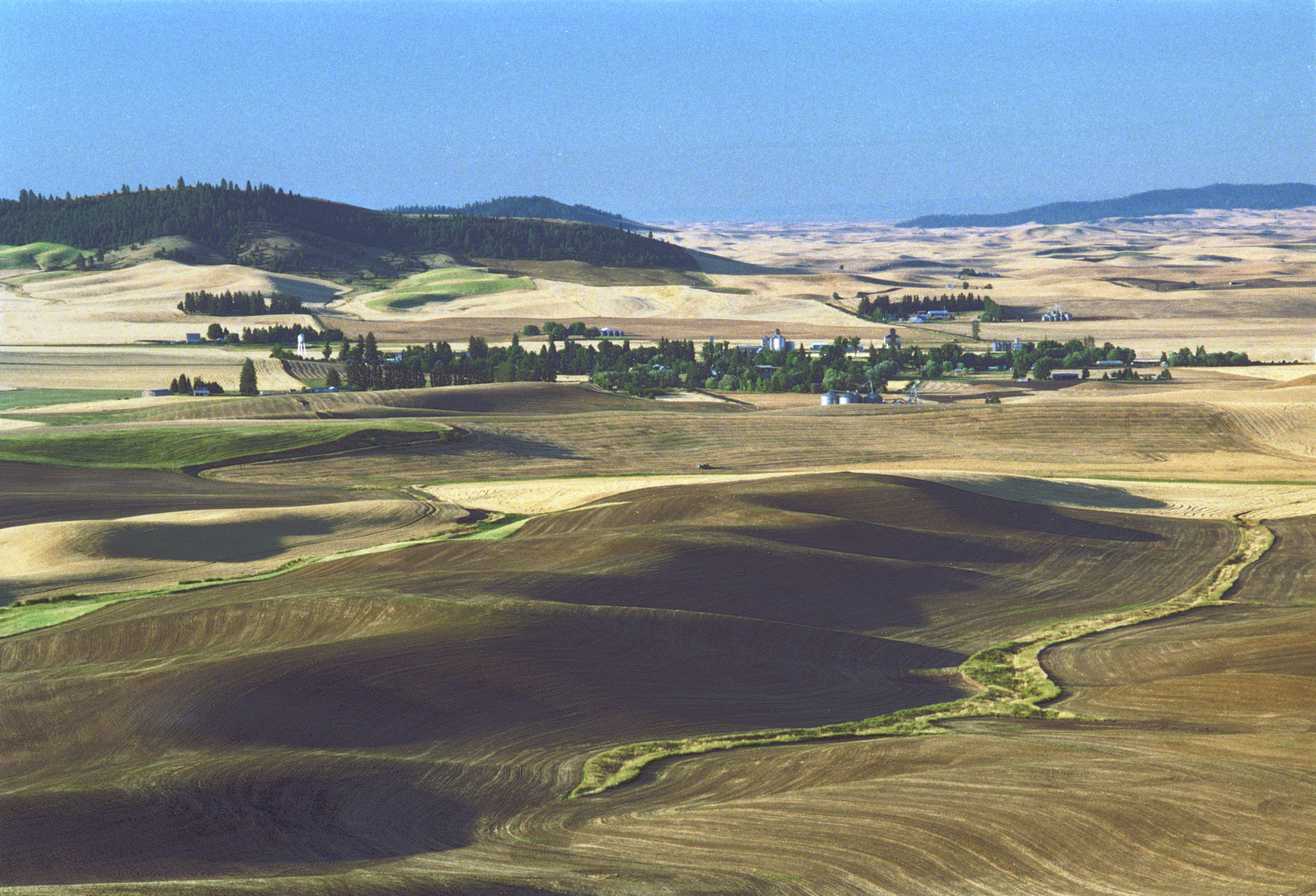
Farmington

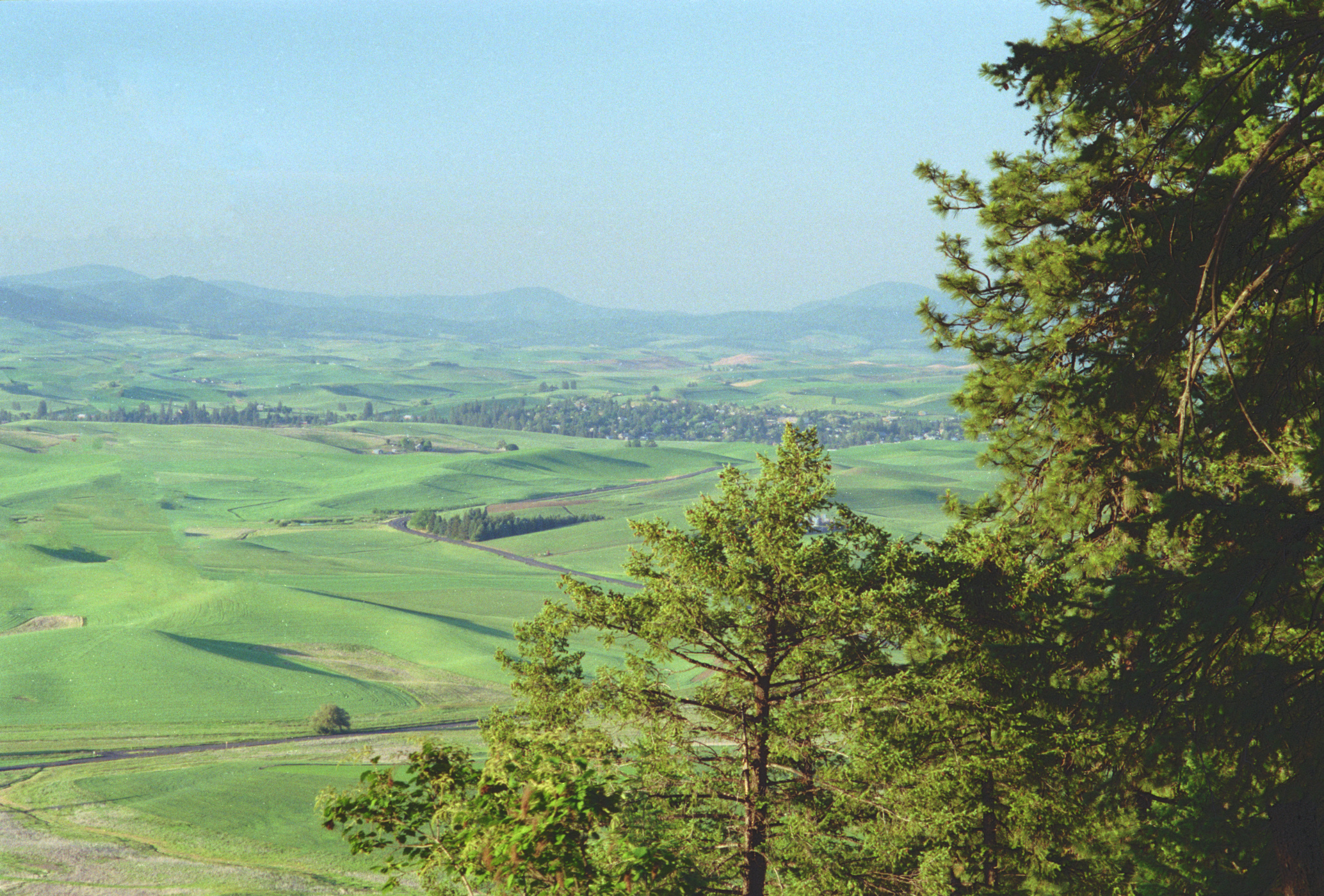
Palouse

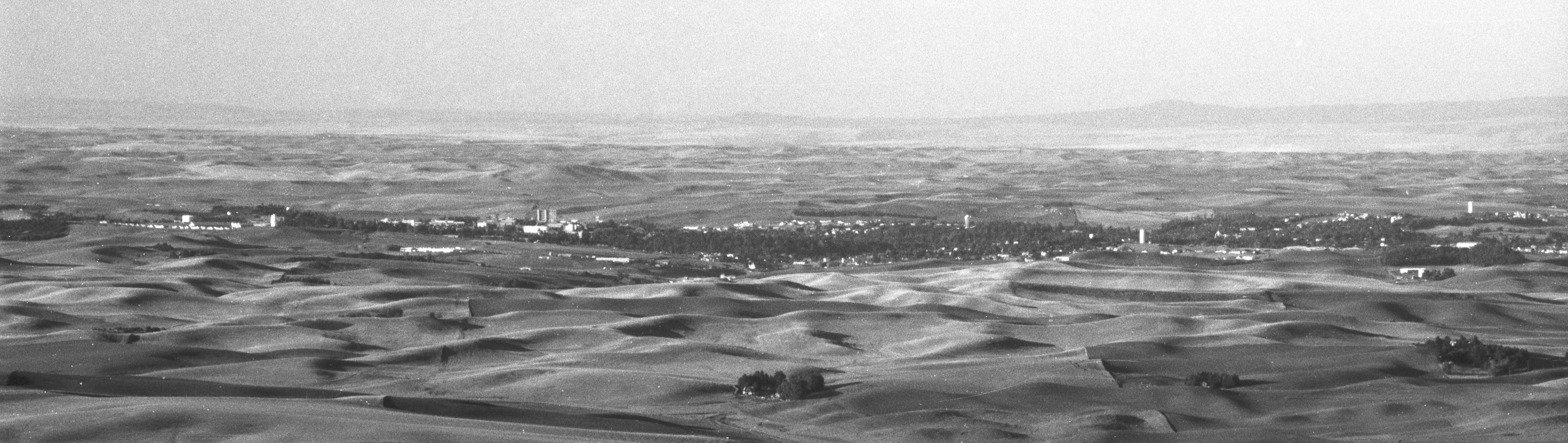
Pullman

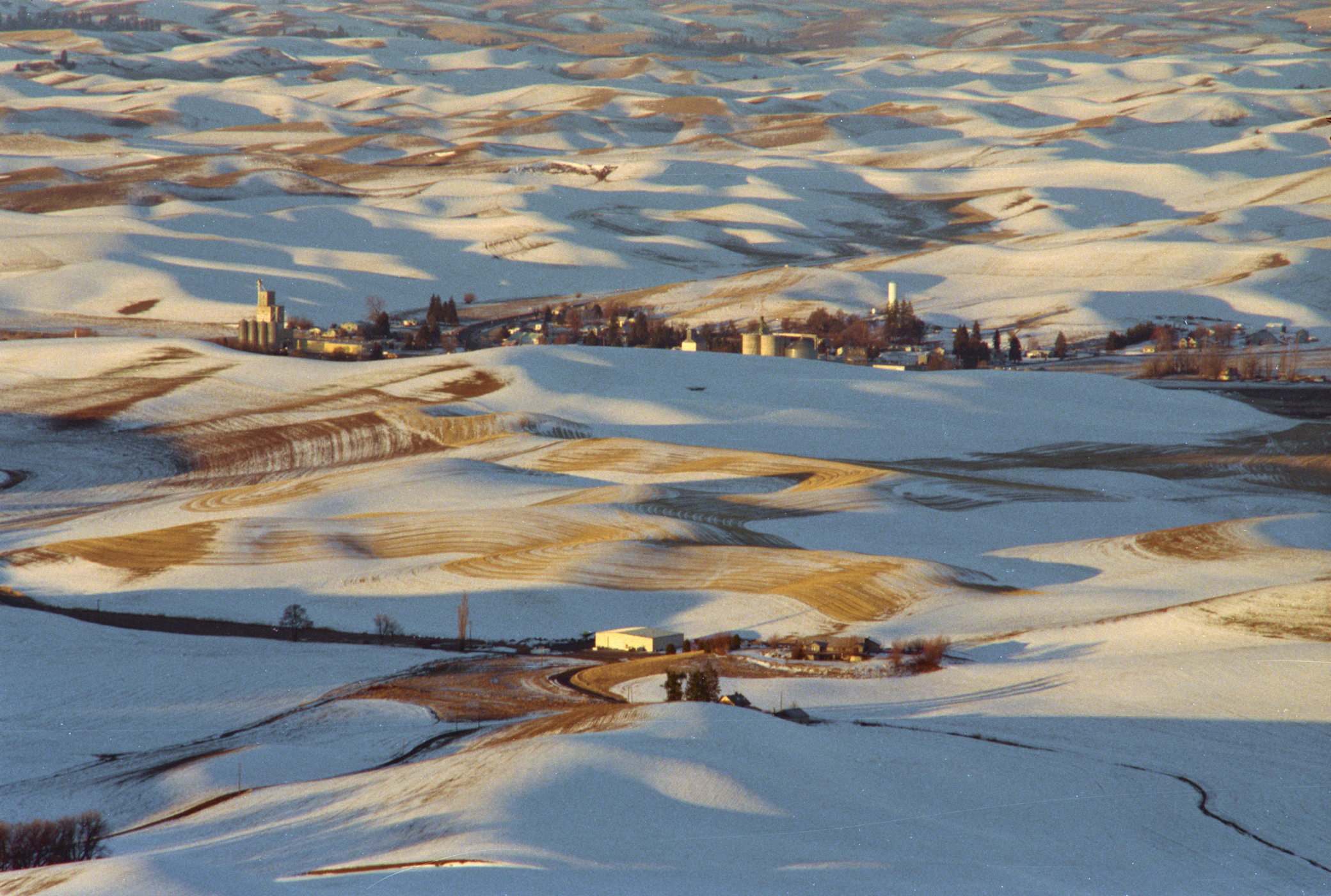
Steptoe

=== Geography ===
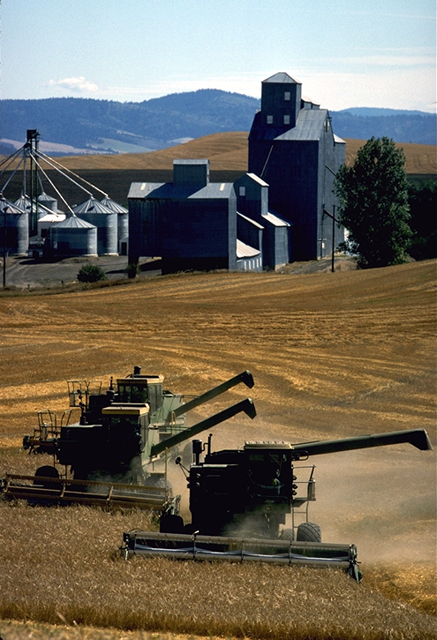
A farm in Whitman County

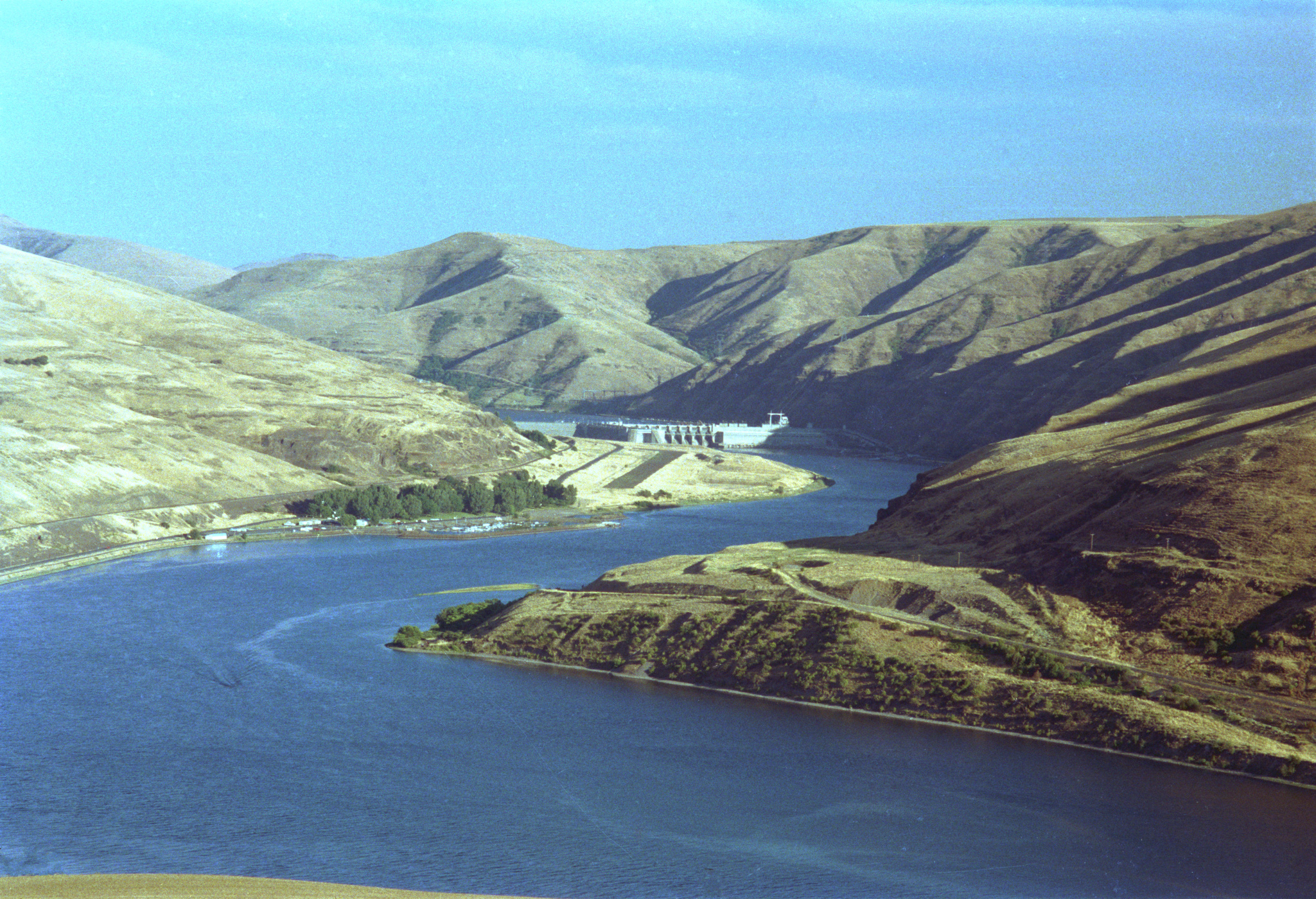
Lower Granite Dam and Boyer Park and Marina on the Snake River

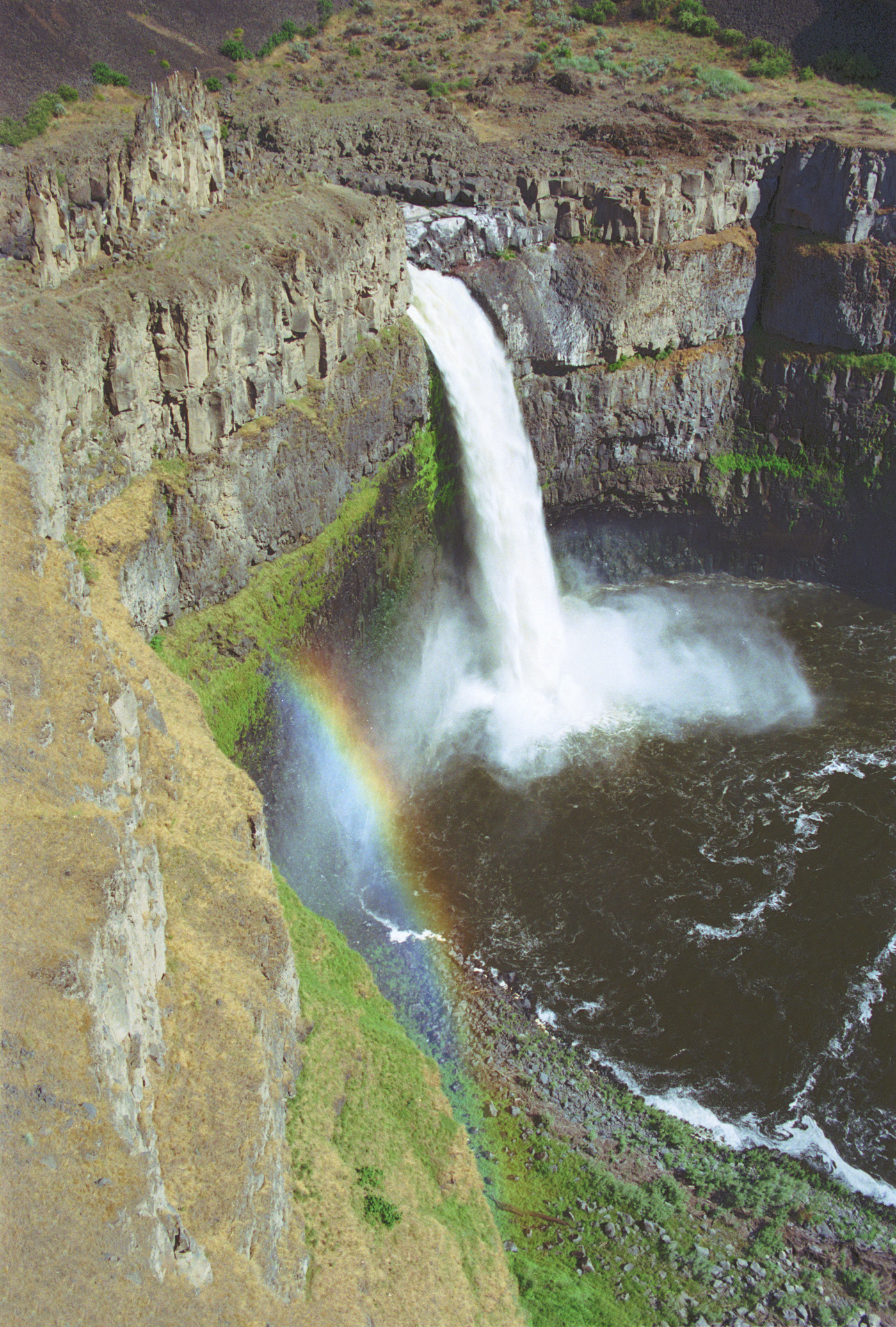
Palouse Falls

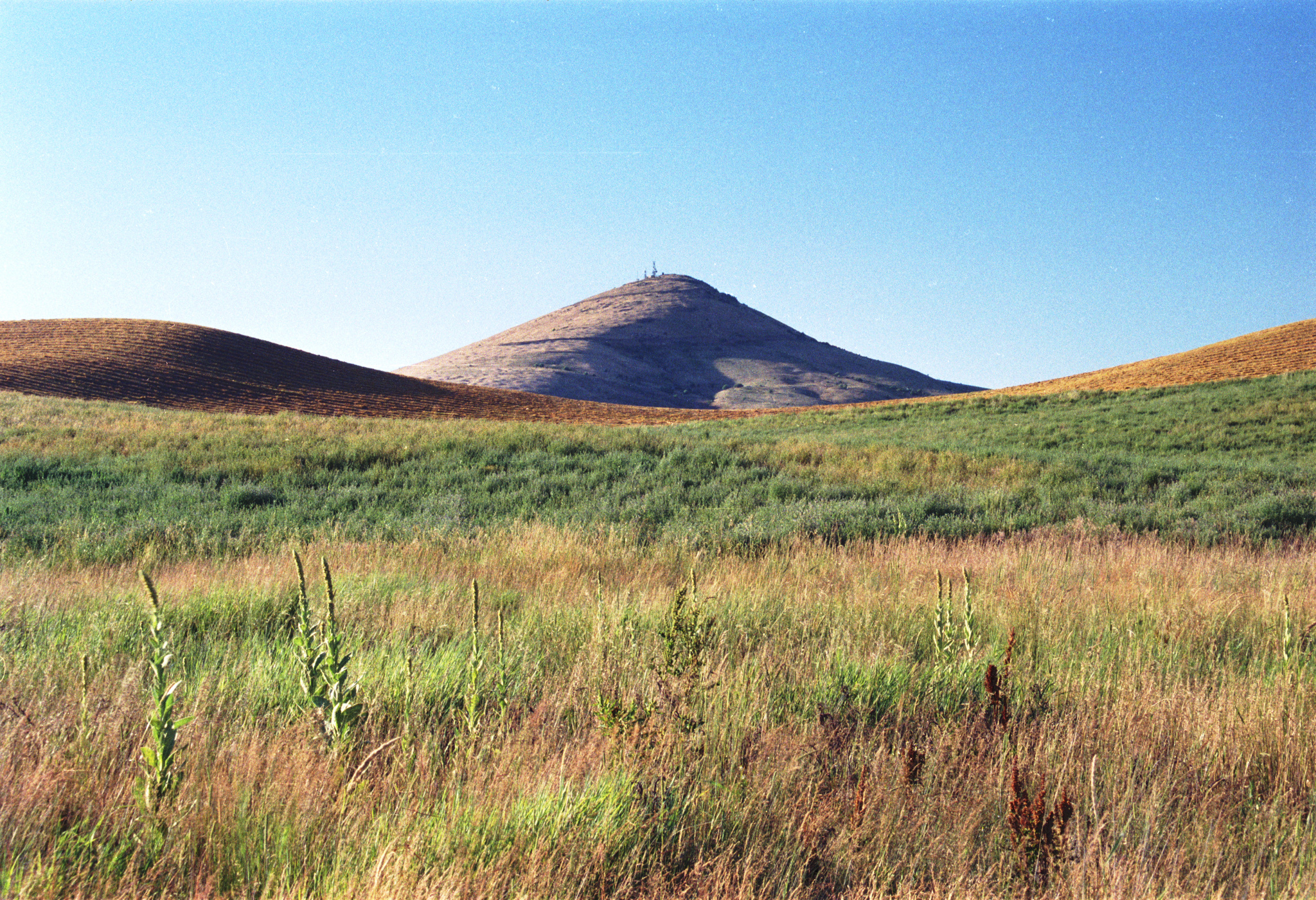
Steptoe Butte

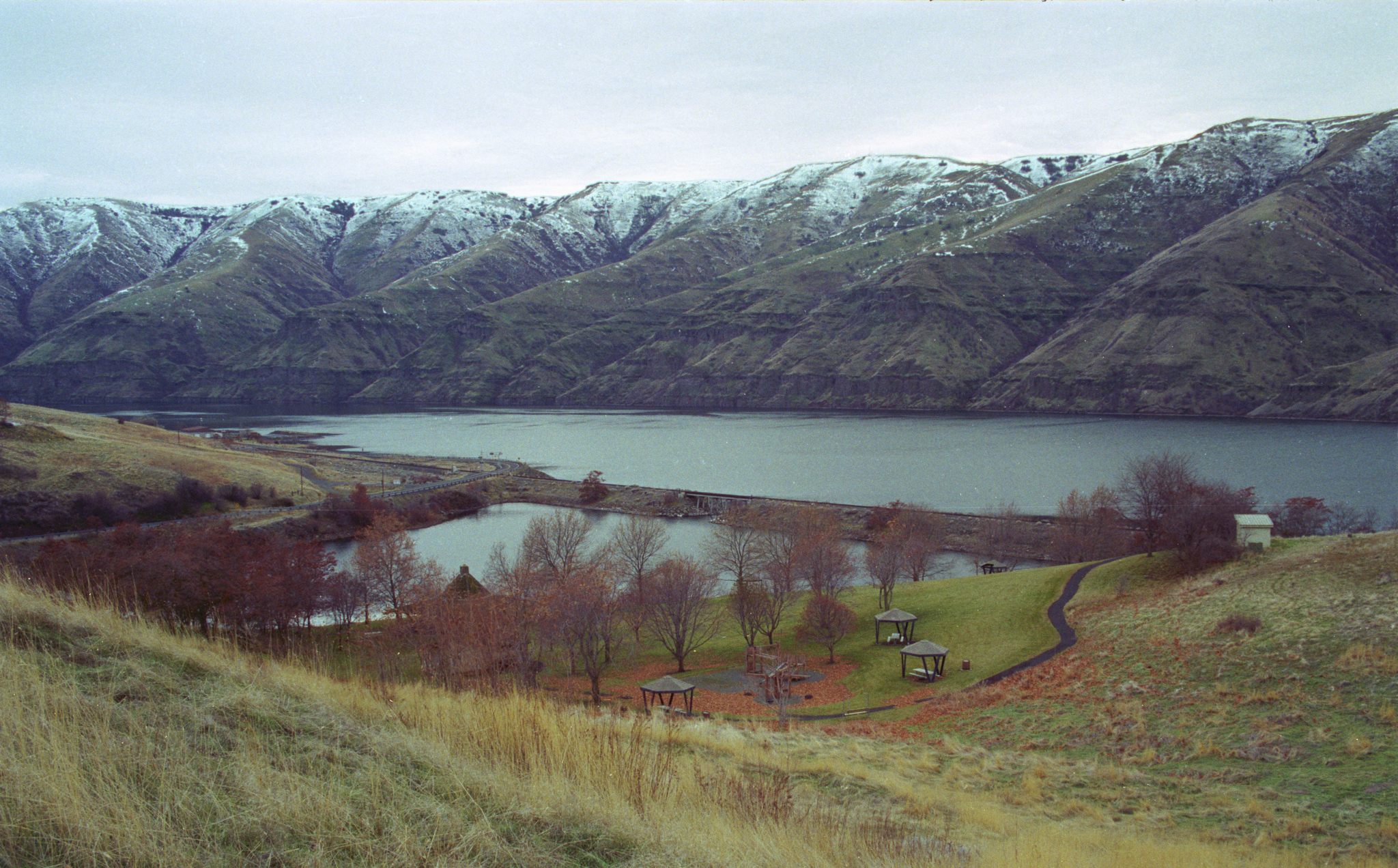
Wawawai County Park

== See also ==
- Whitman County Historical Society
- National Register of Historic Places listings in Whitman County, Washington
