= Palouse River =

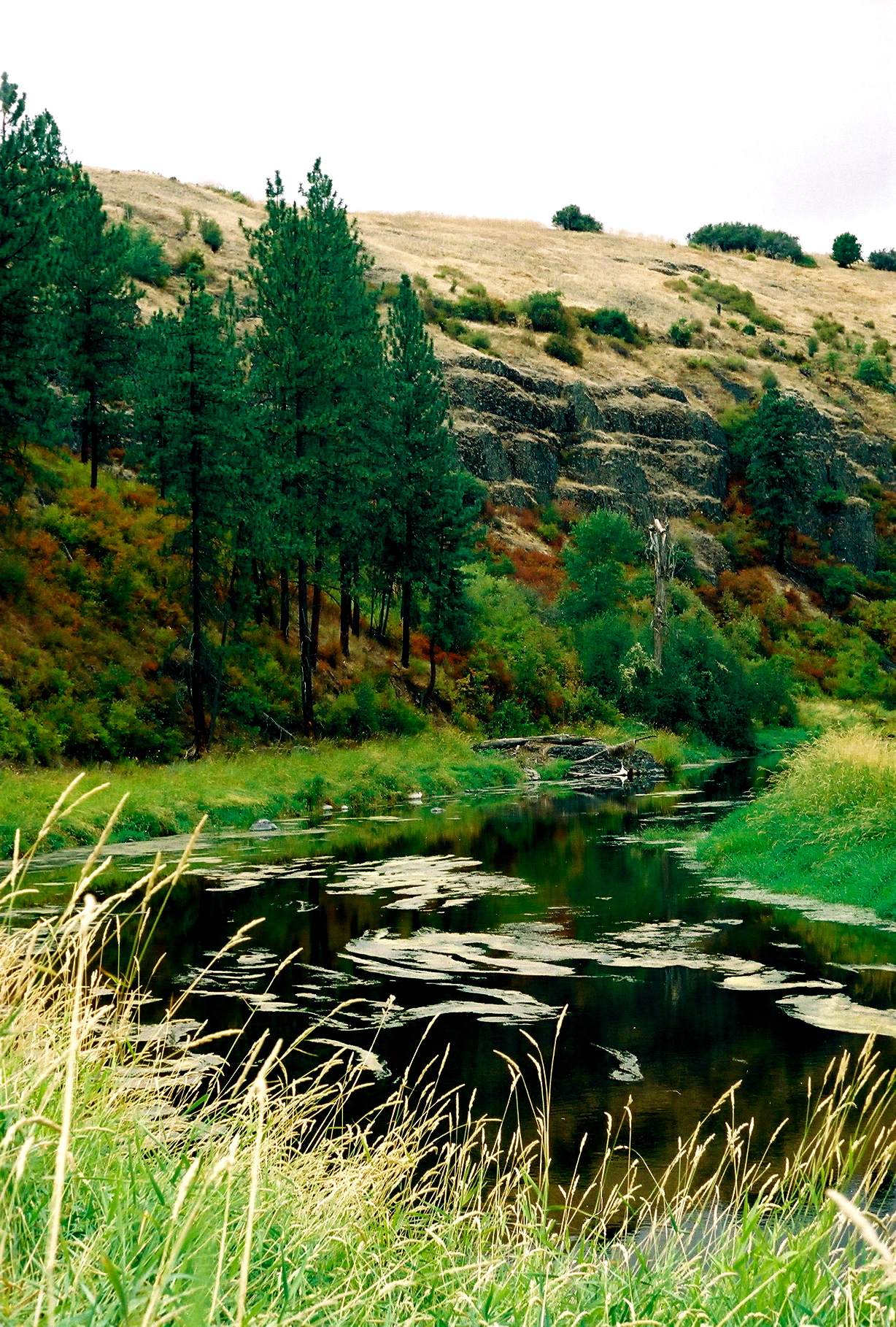
- Several miles downstream from its fork in Colfax; looking west in 2007

- Palouse River's mouth in Washington

Location
- Country: United States
- State: Washington, Idaho
- County: Franklin, Whitman, Adams, Latah

Physical characteristics
- Source: Rocky Mountains
  - coordinates: 46°58′07″N 116°27′31″W
- Mouth: Snake River
  - coordinates: 46°35′24″N 118°12′55″W
  - elevation: 541 ft (165 m)
- Length: 167 mi (269 km)
- Basin size: 3,303 sq mi (8,550 km^{2})
- Discharge
  - location: river mile 19.6 at Hooper
  - average: 599 cu ft/s (17.0 m^{3}/s)
  - minimum: 0 cu ft/s (0 m^{3}/s)
  - maximum: 33,500 cu ft/s (950 m^{3}/s)

The Palouse River is a tributary of the Snake River in Washington and Idaho, in the northwest United States. It flows for 167 miles (269 km) southwestwards, primarily through the Palouse region of southeastern Washington. It is part of the Columbia River Basin, as the Snake River is a tributary of the Columbia River.

Its canyon was carved out by a fork in the catastrophic Missoula Floods of the previous ice age, which spilled over the northern Columbia Plateau and flowed into the Snake River, eroding the river's present course in a few thousand years.

== Course ==
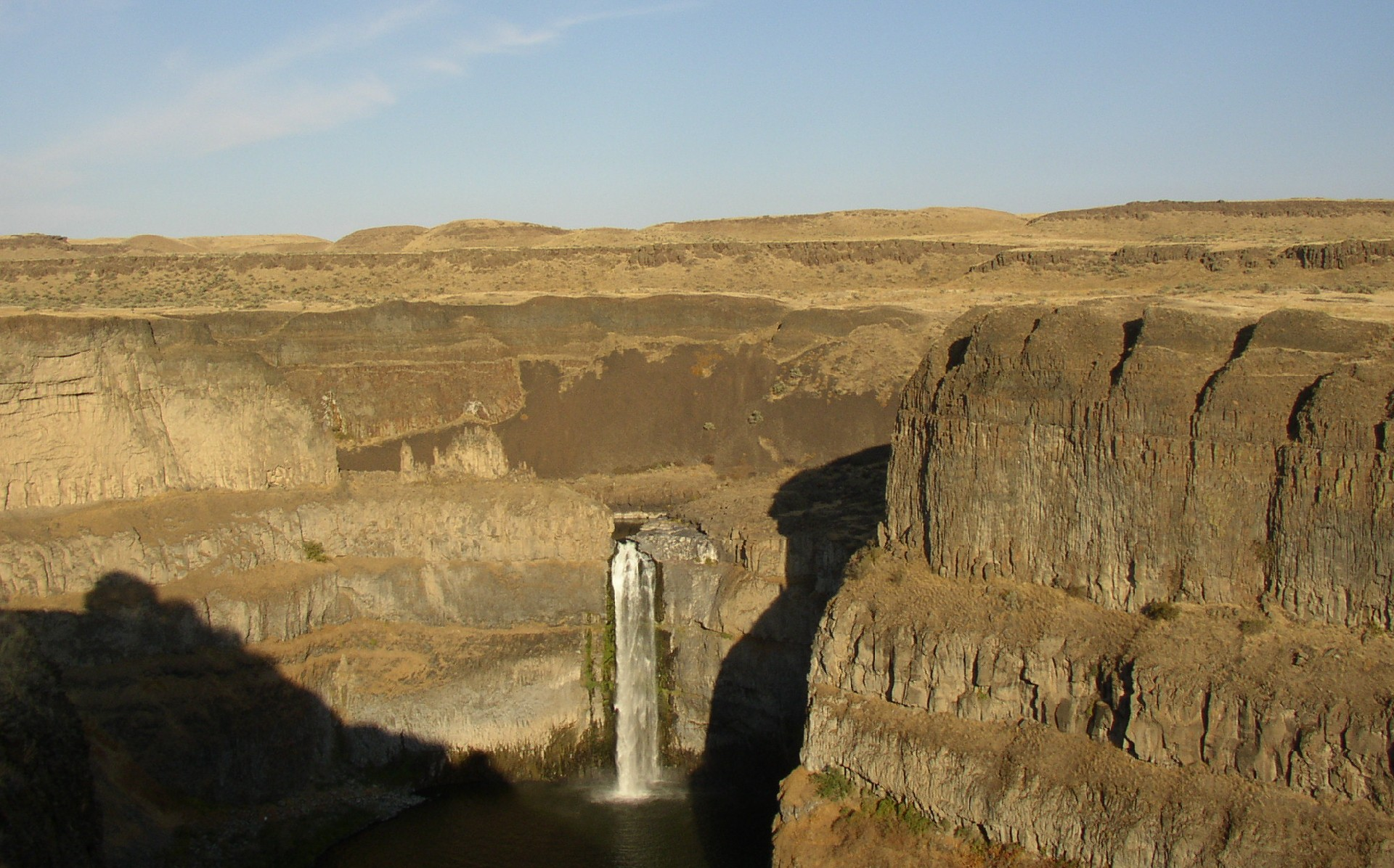
Palouse Falls in 2006

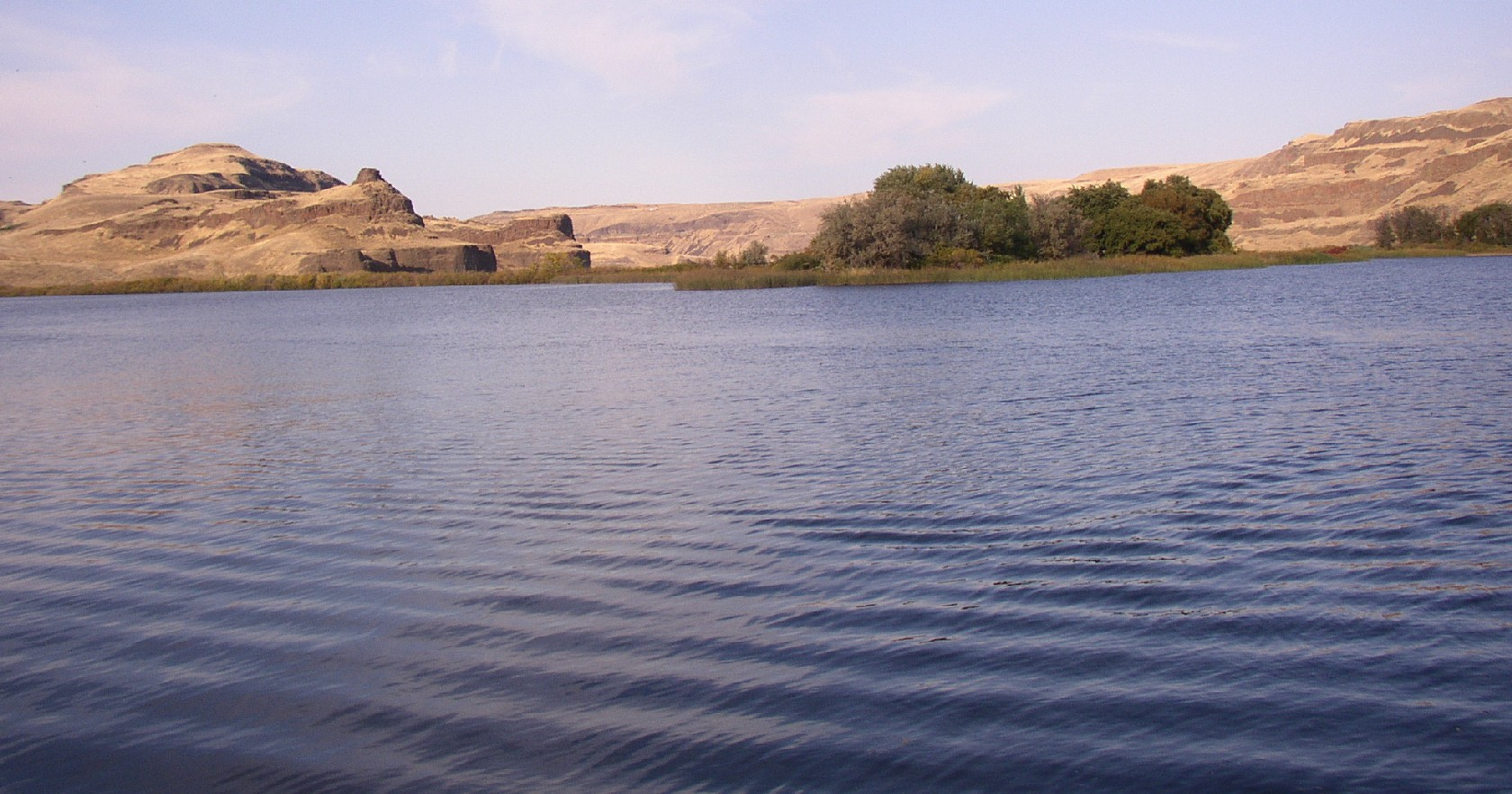
Palouse River entering the Snake at Lyon's Ferry near Starbuck, looking north in 2006

The Palouse River flows from northern Idaho into southeast Washington through the Palouse region, named for the river.

The river originates in Idaho in northeastern Latah County, in the Hoodoo Mountains in the St. Joe National Forest. It flows westward, near State Highway 6, as it nears the state line. In Washington, the river flows in Whitman County to Palouse and then to Colfax, where it meets its South Fork, which originates on the south slopes of Moscow Mountain of the Palouse Range, flows south of Moscow and west to Pullman. (Paradise Creek parallels the South Fork, running through Moscow to Pullman, accompanied by the Bill Chipman Palouse Trail and State Route 270.)

From Colfax, the river meanders west and ends up in the lower Snake River southwest of Hooper, but not before dropping two hundred feet (60 m) over Palouse Falls. The Palouse River enters the Snake River below the Little Goose Dam and above the Lower Monumental Dam.

== Basin and discharge ==
The Palouse River's drainage basin is 3,303 square miles (8,550 km^{2}) in area. Its mean annual discharge, as measured by USGS gage 13351000 at Hooper (river mile 19.6), is 599 cubic feet per second (17 m^{3}/s), with a maximum daily recorded flow of 27,800 cu ft/s (787 m^{3}/s), and a minimum of zero flow.

== Geology ==
The Missoula Floods that swept periodically across eastern Washington and across the Columbia River Plateau during the Pleistocene epoch carved out the Palouse River Canyon, which is 1,000 feet (300 m) deep in places.

The ancestral Palouse River flowed through the now-dry Washtucna Coulee directly into the Columbia River. The present-day canyon was created when the Missoula Floods overtopped the northern drainage divide of the ancestral Palouse River, diverting it to the current course to the Snake River by eroding a new, deeper channel.

The area is characterized by interconnected and hanging flood-created coulees, cataracts, plunge pools, kolk created potholes, rock benches, buttes and pinnacles typical of scablands.

== See also ==
- Palouse Falls State Park
- List of rivers of Idaho
- List of longest streams of Idaho
- List of rivers of Washington (state)
- Tributaries of the Columbia River
