= Palouse, Washington =

City in Washington, United States

Palouse
- City
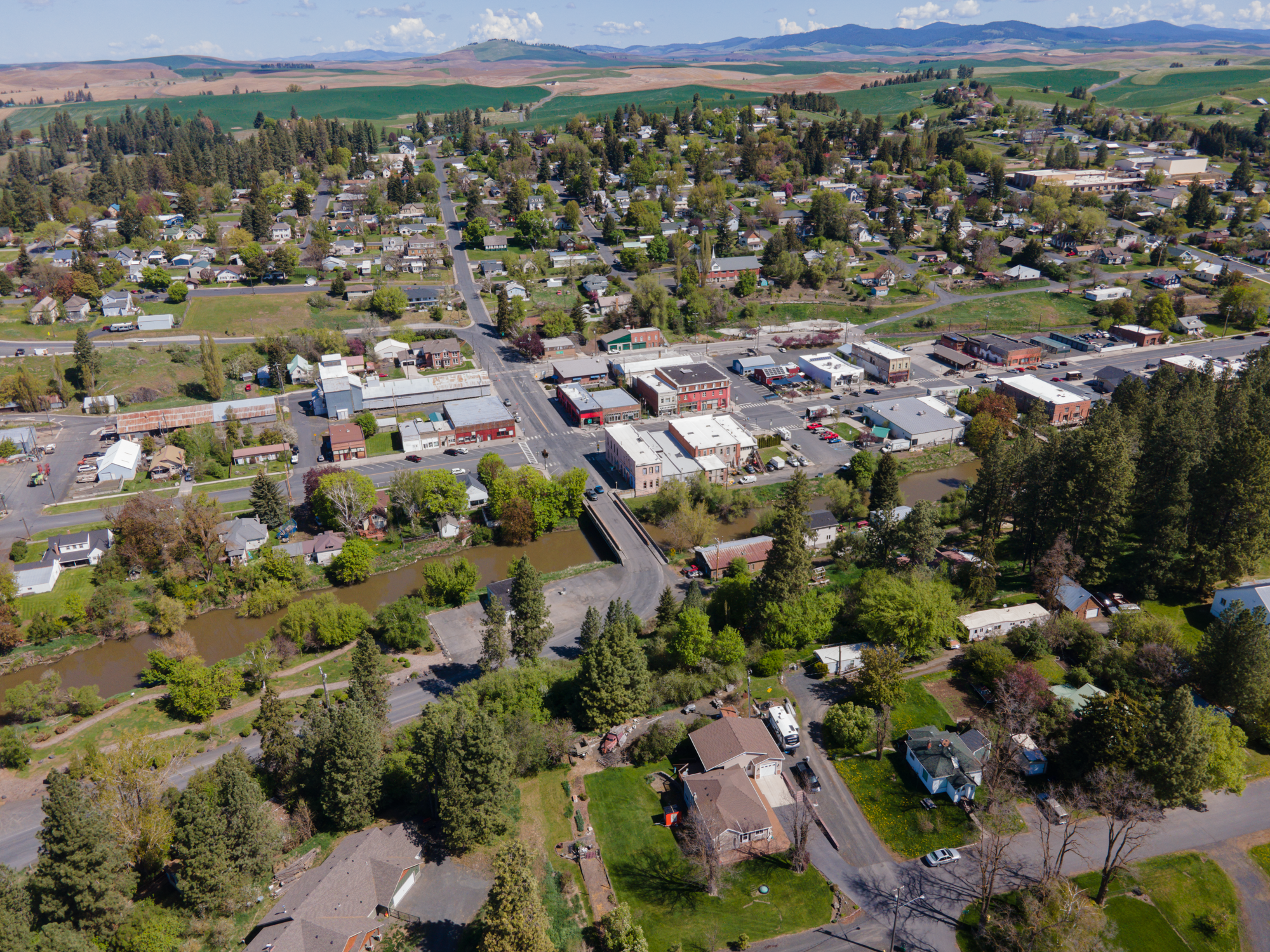
- Aerial view of Palouse looking north

- Location of Palouse, Washington
- Coordinates: 46°54′37″N 117°04′31″W
- Country: United States
- State: Washington
- County: Whitman

Government
  - Type: Mayor–council
  - Mayor: Tim Sievers

Area
  - Total: 1.05 sq mi (2.71 km^{2})
  - Land: 1.05 sq mi (2.71 km^{2})
  - Water: 0 sq mi (0.00 km^{2})
- Elevation: 2,431 ft (741 m)

Population (2020)
  - Total: 1,015
  - Density: 970/sq mi (375/km^{2})
- Time zone: UTC-8 (PST)
  - Summer (DST): UTC-7 (PDT)
- ZIP code: 99161
- Area code: 509
- FIPS code: 53-52950
- GNIS feature ID: 2411364
- Website: palousewa.gov

Palouse is a city in Whitman County, Washington, United States. The population was 1,015 at the 2020 census.

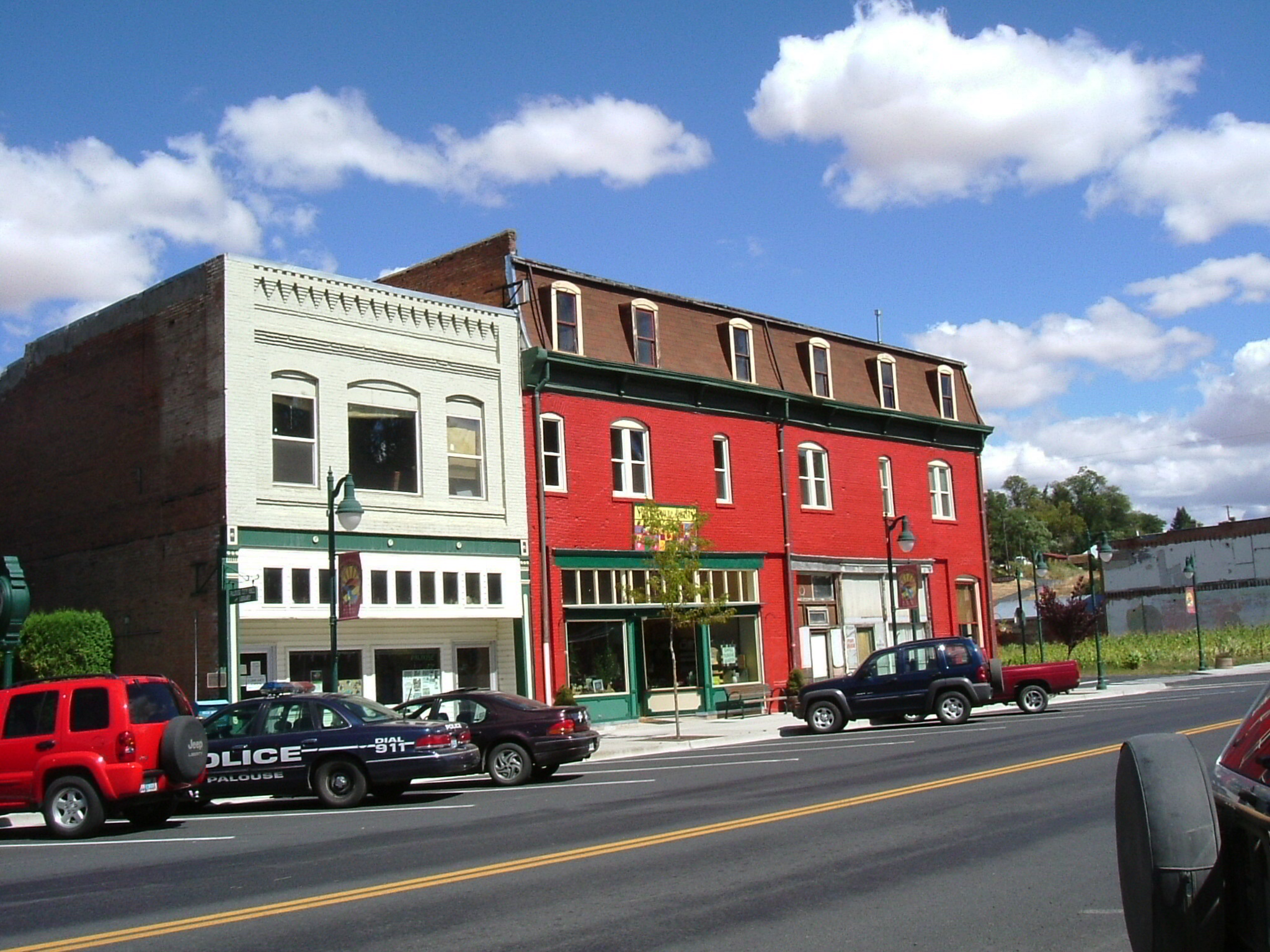
Street view of Palouse

== History ==
Palouse was first settled in 1869 by William Ewing. The townsite was founded in 1875 by W.P. Breeding.

Palouse is named for the region of farmland in which it is situated, and was incorporated in 1888.

The town made national news in 1974 when the city's school was able to let its children produce, film and telecast its students' TV programs on Channel 9 of the Palouse cable TV system.

Palouse adopted a city flag on August 27, 2019, following a campaign started by a local resident. The flag consists of a green field with a gold and blue knot that represents the city's people, commerce, and the Palouse River.

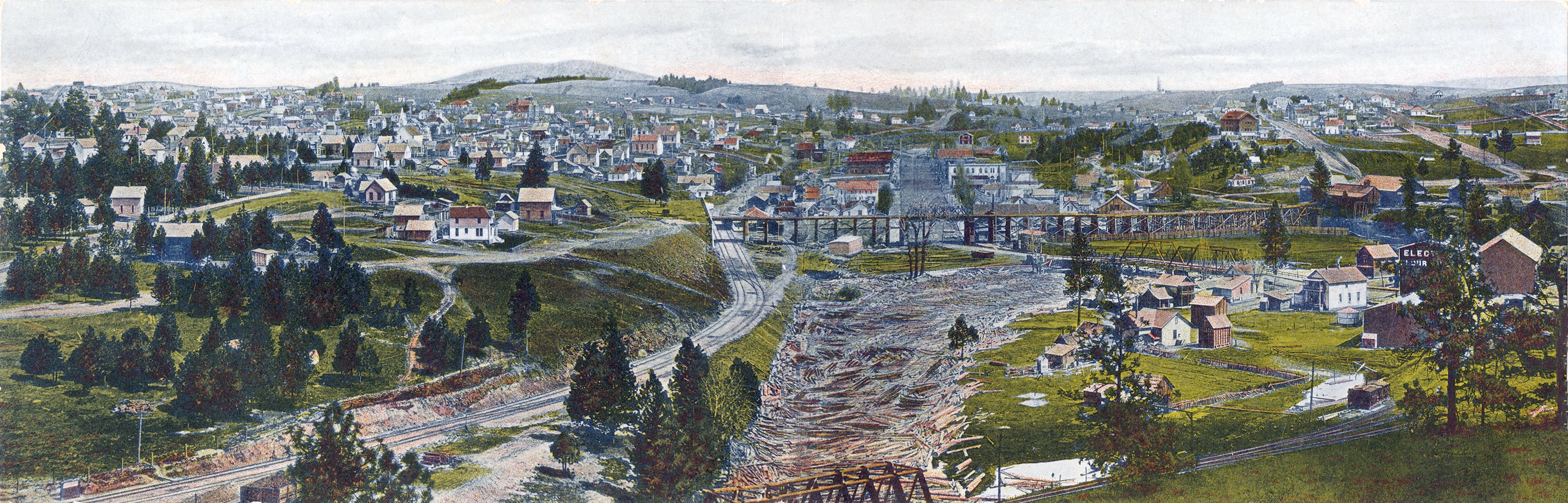
Palouse, circa 1907

== Geography ==
According to the United States Census Bureau, the city has a total area of 1.08 square miles (2.80 km^{2}), all of it land.

== Demographics ==
Historical population
Census	Pop.	Note	%±
1880	148		—
1890	1,119		656.1%
1900	929		−17.0%
1910	1,549		66.7%
1920	1,179		−23.9%
1930	1,151		−2.4%
1940	1,028		−10.7%
1950	1,036		0.8%
1960	926		−10.6%
1970	948		2.4%
1980	1,005		6.0%
1990	915		−9.0%
2000	1,011		10.5%
2010	998		−1.3%
2020	1,015		1.7%
U.S. Decennial Census

=== 2020 census ===
As of the 2020 census, Palouse had a population of 1,015. The median age was 46.4 years. 21.3% of residents were under the age of 18 and 21.1% of residents were 65 years of age or older. For every 100 females there were 93.3 males, and for every 100 females age 18 and over there were 92.1 males age 18 and over.

0.0% of residents lived in urban areas, while 100.0% lived in rural areas.

There were 453 households in Palouse, of which 25.6% had children under the age of 18 living in them. Of all households, 53.4% were married-couple households, 17.9% were households with a male householder and no spouse or partner present, and 23.6% were households with a female householder and no spouse or partner present. About 31.6% of all households were made up of individuals and 16.8% had someone living alone who was 65 years of age or older.

There were 513 housing units, of which 11.7% were vacant. The homeowner vacancy rate was 1.9% and the rental vacancy rate was 11.0%.

Racial composition as of the 2020 census
Race	Number	Percent
White	931	91.7%
Black or African American	4	0.4%
American Indian and Alaska Native	6	0.6%
Asian	6	0.6%
Native Hawaiian and Other Pacific Islander	0	0.0%
Some other race	4	0.4%
Two or more races	64	6.3%
Hispanic or Latino (of any race)	26	2.6%

=== 2010 census ===
As of the 2010 census, there were 998 people, 429 households, and 291 families living in the city. The population density was 924.1 inhabitants per square mile (356.8/km^{2}). There were 474 housing units at an average density of 438.9 per square mile (169.5/km^{2}). The racial makeup of the city was 94.4% White, 1.3% Native American, 0.9% Asian, 0.4% from other races, and 3.0% from two or more races. Hispanic or Latino of any race were 2.4% of the population.

There were 429 households, of which 29.4% had children under the age of 18 living with them, 57.6% were married couples living together, 7.2% had a female householder with no husband present, 3.0% had a male householder with no wife present, and 32.2% were non-families. 27.5% of all households were made up of individuals, and 10.3% had someone living alone who was 65 years of age or older. The average household size was 2.29 and the average family size was 2.79.

The median age in the city was 43.8 years. 21.4% of residents were under the age of 18; 4.9% were between the ages of 18 and 24; 26.2% were from 25 to 44; 32.9% were from 45 to 64; and 14.4% were 65 years of age or older. The gender makeup of the city was 49.5% male and 50.5% female.

=== 2000 census ===
As of the 2000 census, there were 1,011 people, 432 households, and 288 families living in the city. The population density was 944.8 people per square mile (364.8/km^{2}). There were 471 housing units at an average density of 440.2 per square mile (170.0/km^{2}). The racial makeup of the city was 95.94% White, 0.99% Native American, 0.30% Asian, 0.99% from other races, and 1.78% from two or more races. Hispanic or Latino of any race were 1.68% of the population.

There were 432 households, out of which 31.5% had children under the age of 18 living with them, 53.0% were married couples living together, 10.9% had a female householder with no husband present, and 33.3% were non-families. 28.9% of all households were made up of individuals, and 10.9% had someone living alone who was 65 years of age or older. The average household size was 2.34 and the average family size was 2.88.

In the city, the age distribution of the population shows 26.9% under the age of 18, 5.7% from 18 to 24, 30.4% from 25 to 44, 23.9% from 45 to 64, and 13.1% who were 65 years of age or older. The median age was 38 years. For every 100 females, there were 94.0 males. For every 100 females age 18 and over, there were 93.0 males.

The median income for a household in the city was $34,583, and the median income for a family was $41,125. Males had a median income of $30,804 versus $25,515 for females. The per capita income for the city was $15,754. About 8.6% of families and 9.5% of the population were below the poverty line, including 9.2% of those under age 18 and 18.7% of those age 65 or over.

== Notable people ==
- Mouse Davis, American football coach
- Raymond Alvah Hanson, inventor and entrepreneur
- Donald W. Meinig, historian
