= Bovill =

Bovill may refer to:

== People ==
- Bovill (surname)

== Places ==
- Bovill, Idaho, USA
  - Bovill Opera House
  - Hotel Bovill

== See also ==
- Bovell
- Bovril
- Clan Boswell
