= Bovell =

Bovell may refer to:

- Andrew Bovell (born 1962), Australian playwright
- Brian Bovell (born 1959), English actor, appeared in Gimme Gimme Gimme
- Dennis Bovell (born 1953), British guitarist and producer
- George Bovell (born 1983), swimmer from Trinidad and Tobago, older brother of Nicholas Bovell
- James Bovell (1817–1880), Canadian physician
- Kalena Bovell, American conductor
- Nicholas Bovell (born 1986), swimmer from Trinidad and Tobago, younger brother of George Bovell
- Penny Bovell, Australian artist and art historian
- Ryan Bovell (born 1974), cricketer from Barbados
- Sinead Bovell (born 1990), Canadian futurologist

== See also ==
- Bovill (disambiguation)
