= Gritman Medical Center =

Geography
- Location: 700 S. Main Street, Moscow, Idaho, U.S.
- Coordinates: 46.7285°N 117.0005°W

Organisation
- Care system: Public hospital
- Type: Community

Services
- Emergency department: Level IV

History
- Founded: 1898; 128 years ago by Dr. Charles Gritman

Links
- Website: gritman.org
- Lists: Hospitals in U.S.

Gritman Medical Center is a critical access, not-for-profit hospital in the western United States, located in Moscow, Idaho. Established in 129 years ago in 1897, the hospital is named after Dr. Charles L. Gritman. The medical center is the largest private employer in Latah County.

== History ==
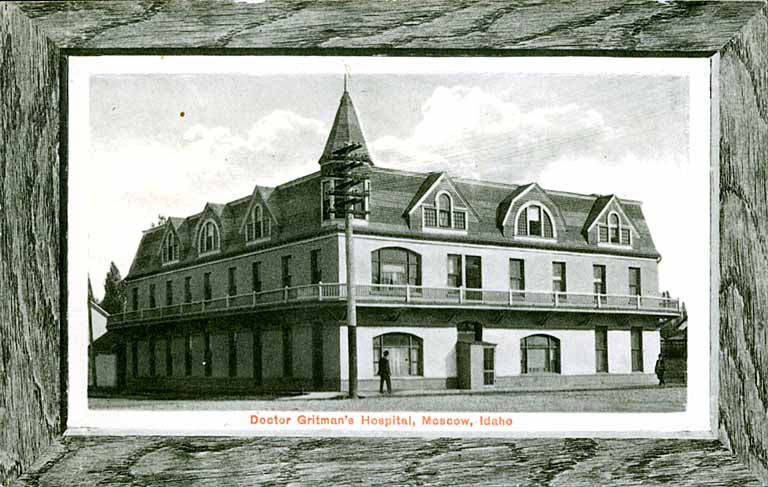
Doctor Gritman's Hospital, Moscow, Idaho (between 1910 and 1920)

Dr. Gritman began providing care to the Moscow community in 1893, visiting patients throughout Latah County by horse and buggy. In 1897, he purchased the former McGregor Hotel, at the southeast corner of Seventh and Main Streets, and opened the doors of the original Gritman hospital. The original hospital housed 30 beds for surgical patients and expecting mothers. Dr. Gritman performed the first appendectomy in the area at the hospital.

After Dr. Gritman passed at age 70 in 1933, his wife Bertie opened the hospital to Moscow's physicians. By this time, the hospital began to need renovations to meet 20th century medical standards. Local businesses and professionals began to develop a plan to construct a new hospital. This group adapted into a non-profit organization that later became the Gritman Medical Center General Membership, a body still active today from which the hospital selects its board of directors. Dr. Gritman's wife, Bertie, gave the original hospital and the property to the community under the condition the hospital always bear Dr. Gritman's name.

=== 1940–1959 ===
On December 21, 1940, Gritman Memorial Hospital opened its doors for operation. The four-story south wing housed 25 patient beds. A second-floor ramp connected the new building to the old hospital structure (former McGregor Hotel), which was being used as storage and emergency overflow.

The original building was cleared in 1942 to allow for the building of the north wing to be connected to the previously constructed south wing. The corner-stone entrance connecting the two wings serves as a historic landmark in the Moscow community.

The hospital, free from debt by 1957, once again sought expansion to provide a growing community with more advanced health care.

=== 1960–1985 ===
The center wing of the hospital was dedicated in May 1962, allowing the hospital more space to better serve the Palouse. The east wing of the hospital, opened in 1974, included more beds, laboratories, a radiology department, and a new lobby and gift shop.

The hospital began to seek management groups in 1982, creating a partnership with Hospital Cooperation of American. The group later became Quorum, with whom the hospital is still a partner. In 1987, a new diagnostic imaging wing opened, creating the space for the hospital to add new medical technology and provide more services to the Moscow community.

=== 1990s ===
In 1991, the official name of the hospital was changed from Gritman Memorial Hospital to Gritman Medical Center to reflect the addition of wellness services and clinics. The hospital still bears the name Gritman Medical Center today.

Continuing to seek to deliver the best in health care to the Moscow community, Gritman announced a $4.6 million renovation in 1994. The project added 50,000 square feet (4,650 m^{2}) of space to the hospital in 1994, giving room for more clinical, surgical, and administrative services.

=== 2004 ===
On July 1, 2004, the hospital completed a 52,000-square-foot (4,830 m^{2}) renovation, built over Eighth Street between Main and Washington. The update included a winterized and heated rooftop helipad, the Patricia J. Kempthorne Women's Imaging Center, and the Family Birth Center and Women's Health Services. The update also added more outpatient and inpatient care and a new critical care unit. The hospital's gift shop became Bertie's Gift Shoppe, named for the wife of Dr. Gritman.

=== 2018–present ===
A fully hospital-funded 56,000-square-foot (5,200 m^{2}) medical office and health service building was constructed adjacent to the main hospital on the west side of Main Street, south of Eighth. The space houses new clinics, clinician health education, and patient services such as oncology. The site was occupied for decades by concrete grain elevators, which were demolished in 2007.

The third floor of the space houses the WWAMI Medical Exchange Program, a partnership with the University of Washington School of Medicine and the western states of Washington, Wyoming, Alaska, Montana, and Idaho. Gritman Medical Center partnered with University of Idaho to bring some of the newest anatomy laboratories and learning centers in the country to 80 first- and second-year WWAMI students.

The hospital also acquired the Moscow Family Medicine clinics, whose services included an urgent care clinic, the downtown and Westside family clinics, and the University of Idaho Student Health Clinic. Gritman now operates five regional family medicine clinics including the two Moscow clinics listed above, and clinics in Troy, Kendrick, and Potlatch.

== Achievements ==
Gritman Medical Center has ranked in the top 100 Critical Access Hospitals in the country and has been awarded the Gold Seal of Approval for Hospital Accreditation from The Joint Commission.

The Medical Center currently holds a five-star rating from the U.S. government for patient experience, placing it among the best hospitals in the country according to rankings from Hospital Compare based on patient surveys.

Gritman also ranks in the 98th percentile patient satisfaction in the family birth center, in the 99th percentile for helpfulness and confidence in therapy staff, and in the 96th percentile for overall patient satisfaction in the medical surgery and critical care unit according to an independent national survey of 4,120 hospitals.

== Operations ==
Gritman provides several services & care areas throughout three buildings and eight clinics, including services throughout the main hospital, an urgent care facility, and the University of Idaho Student Health Clinic.

Gritman Medical Center Services
24 Hour Emergency Care
Cancer Care
Clinic Laboratory
Clinical Nutrition
Critical Care
Diabetes Care
Diagnostic Imaging
Dialysis Clinic
Ear, nose & throat & Audiology
Family & Internal Medicine
Family Birth Center
Cardiac Care
Interventional Pain
Pulmanory Care
Pediatrics
Psychiatry & Mental Health
Surgery
Therapy
Urology
Wellness Center
Women's Imaging
Wound Healing Center

== Community ==
Gritman Medical Center focuses on community involvement and meeting the health care needs of local individuals.

=== Community Health Needs Assessment ===
The hospital develops a Community Health Needs Assessment every three years to address the medical and health needs of the community, highlighting the five greatest health care needs of the public. The hospital's 2016 Community Health Needs Assessment indicates mental health and suicide, substance abuse, access to physicians, affordability and accessibility, and obesity and weight issues as the top five health concerns within the community.

=== Community health education ===
The hospital provides certified American Heart Association First Aid/CPR training, childbirth education courses, and health and fitness courses to local individuals.

=== Philanthropic efforts ===
The hospital supports students and wellness initiatives in the community through The Gritman Foundation. Funds from the foundation funds provide support for local health initiatives, wellness programs and scholarships for students pursuing higher education in the health care field. The Gritman Foundation is supported by individual donations and proceeds from charitable events.

== Leadership ==
A 10-member board of directors heads Gritman Medical Center. Individuals serving on the board of directors are selected from a larger, general membership board.

Board of directors
Rula Awwad-Rafferty
Steve Busch
Richard Heimsch
Dr. Charles Jacobson
Greg Kimberling
Janie Nirk
Aaron Ranisate
Barbara Wells
Dr. Kraig White
Robin Woods
