= Idaho State Highway 8 =

State highway in Idaho, United States

State Highway 8
- SH-8 highlighted in red

Route information
- Maintained by ITD
- Length: 53.589 mi (86.243 km)

Major junctions
- West end: SR 270 in Moscow
- US 95 in Moscow; SH-99 in Troy; SH-9 near Deary; SH-3 in Deary; SH-3 in Bovill
- East end: 1st Street and Main Street in Elk River

Location
- Country: United States
- State: Idaho

Highway system
- Idaho State Highway System; Interstate; US; State
← SH-7	→ SH-9

State Highway 8 (SH-8) is an Idaho state highway in Latah and Clearwater counties, running from the Washington state line in Moscow to Elk River. It is 53.589 miles (86.24 km) in length, and runs primarily east–west.

== Route description ==
SH-8 begins at the Washington state line, connecting with Washington State Route 270 to Pullman. Between the cities to the north is the Pullman-Moscow Regional Airport. The two state highways comprise the "Moscow-Pullman Highway" in the eight miles (13 km) between the university cities.

In Moscow, Highway 8 runs east along the northern boundary of the University of Idaho campus as Pullman Road (widened to five lanes in 1996–97), enters an "S" curve, and becomes Third Street. It briefly overlaps US 95, and runs south through the city center (one ways (since 1981): Jackson Street southbound and Washington Street northbound, a block on either side of Main). South of downtown, SH-8 branches east to become the "Troy Highway" and continues to Troy, where it intersects SH-99.

East of Troy, SH-8 heads generally northeast, intersecting SH-9 shortly before entering Deary and overlapping SH-3 there. From Deary, the overlapping highways run east and northeast to Bovill, where they diverge. From Bovill, SH-8 heads south and southeast into Clearwater County, then turns east and northeast into Elk River, where it ends at the intersection of First and Main streets.

=== Associated trails ===
For non-motorized traffic, Highway 8 is paralleled to the south by a series of paved trails from the state line to Troy, on former railroad corridors. The Bill Chipman Palouse Trail originates in Pullman, gradually ascends alongside Paradise Creek, and terminates a mile into Idaho at Perimeter Road. There it links with Moscow's Paradise Path, which continues alongside the creek on the north and east edges of the UI campus; it connects to the Latah Trail in southeast Moscow and then travels east through open Palouse country to Troy.

== Major intersections ==
County	Location	mi	km	Destinations	Notes
Latah	Moscow	0.000	0.000	SR 270 west – Pullman	Washington state line
Latah	Moscow	1.797	2.892	US 95 north (Washington Street) – Potlatch, Coeur d'Alene	west end of US-95 overlap
Latah	Moscow	2.331	3.751	US 95 south – Lewiston	east end of US-95 overlap
Latah	Troy	14.572	23.451	SH-99 south	
Latah		25.549	41.117	SH-9 north – Potlatch	
Latah	Deary	26.317	42.353	SH-3 south – Kendrick	west end of SH-3 overlap
Latah	Bovill	36.310	58.435	SH-3 north – St. Maries, Coeur d'Alene	east end of SH-3 overlap
Clearwater	Elk River	53.589	86.243	1st Street / Main Street - Orofino via Dent Road	
1.000 mi = 1.609 km; 1.000 km = 0.621 mi: Concurrency terminus

== See also ==
- List of state highways in Idaho
