= John Henry Hayes =

John Henry Hayes may refer to:

- John Hayes (British politician), British Conservative Party politician
- Jack Hayes (politician), British Labour Party politician

== See also ==
- John H. Hays, American Civil War Medal of Honor recipient
