= Patriots (novel series) =

Novel series by James Wesley Rawles

The Patriots novel series
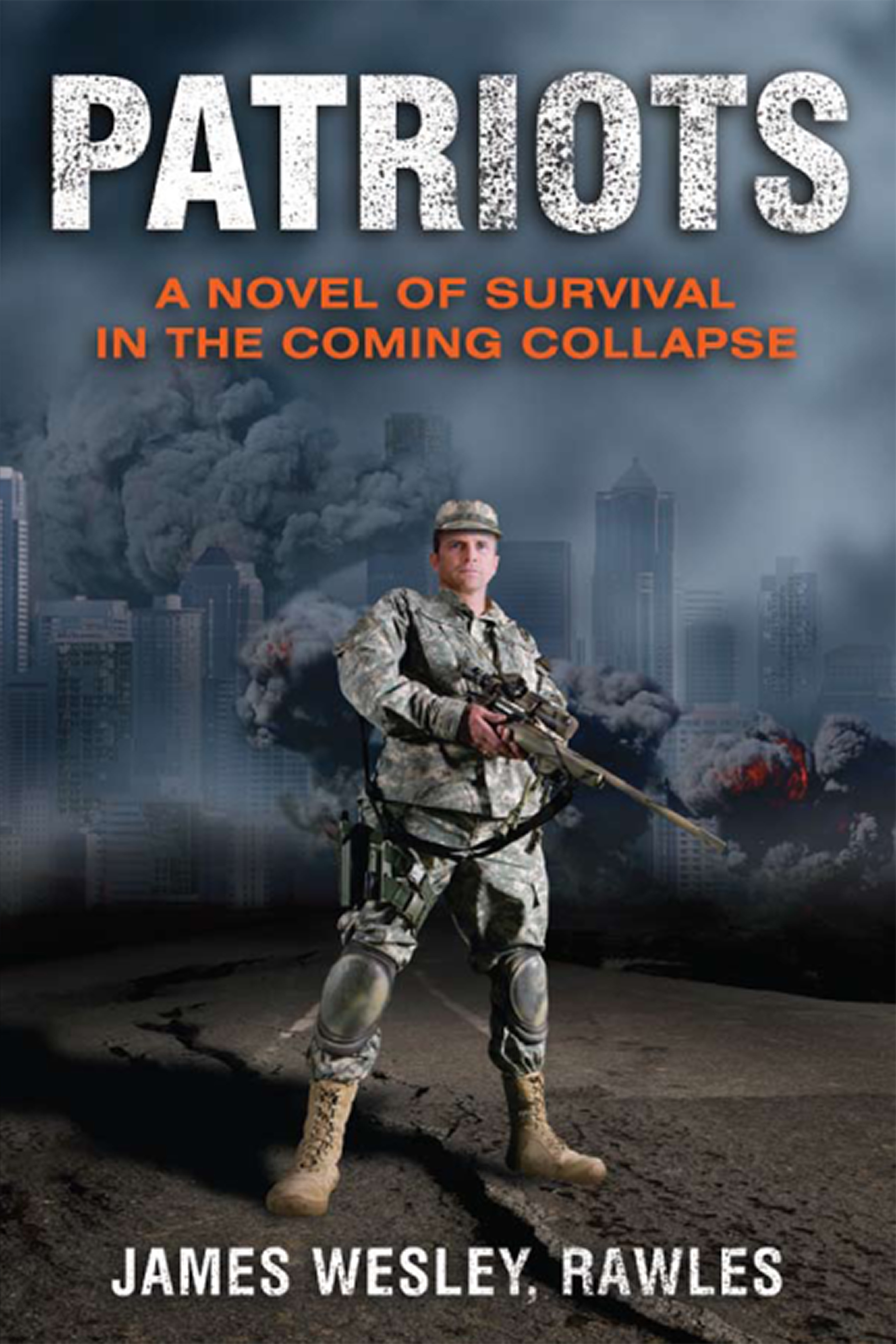
- Cover of the most recent edition of Patriots
- Author: James Wesley Rawles
- Original title: Patriots: Surviving the Coming Collapse
- Language: English
- Genre: Novel
- Publisher: Ulysses Press
- Publication date: 2009
- Publication place: United States
- Media type: Print (Trade paperback)
- Pages: 400
- ISBN: 978-1-56975-599-0
- OCLC: 251196581
- Followed by: Survivors: A Novel of the Coming Collapse

The Patriots novel series is a five-novel series by survivalist novelist and former U.S. Army officer and blogger, James Wesley Rawles. It is followed by his Counter-Caliphate Chronicles novel series.

Patriots: A Novel of Survival in the Coming Collapse, the first book in the series, was first distributed as shareware in 1995 and first published in paperback in 1998. It was updated and re-published in paperback 2009, and then in hardback in 2012. In one week of April 2009, shortly after its release, it was ranked #6 in Amazon.com's overall book sales rankings, which was attributed by the Library Journal to the book's appeal to "a small but vociferous group of people concerned with survivalism".

Set in the near future midst hyperinflation and a catastrophic global economic collapse, Patriots tells the story of a group of survivalists that flee riots and chaos in metropolitan Chicago to a survivalist retreat that they have prepared near Bovill, Idaho.

== Origins ==
The first novel is based on a 19-chapter draft that Rawles wrote in 1990, and first distributed as shareware, under the title The Gray Nineties. It was later expanded to 27 chapters and retitled Triple Ought, and then 33 chapters, under the title TEOTWAWKI: The End of the World as We Know It. In 1997, the rights to the novel were purchased by Huntington House Publishers, a small Christian publishing firm in Lafayette, Louisiana. They abridged the book to 31 chapters and re-titled it Patriots: Surviving the Coming Collapse. This was the publisher's best-selling title from November 1998 to January 2005. In early 2005, Huntington House went out of business, and the copyright reverted to the author. In November 2006, responding to pent-up market demand, Rawles self-published a restored 33-chapter edition of the novel, through XLibris, a vanity press. Patriots was the best-selling title for XLibris from late 2006 to early 2009. In late 2008, the rights to the novel were purchased by Ulysses Press of Berkeley, California. After updating the novel and adding both a glossary and an index, in April 2009 Ulysses Press released the 33-chapter edition under the new title Patriots: A Novel of Survival in the Coming Collapse.

=== Setting ===
Much of Patriots takes place in the Intermountain west, specifically in the Palouse Hills region, in and around Moscow, Idaho.

== Reception ==
Critical reception for the various releases of the book has been generally positive, gaining a cult following among the survivalist community and a positive review from the Frankfurter Allgemeine Zeitung. A reviewer for the Tennessean newspaper called the novel a "combination military thriller and how-to survivalist guide."

Over time the book has gained a larger following, with Rawles speculating that the ongoing financial crisis accounted for the book's popularity among a wider readership traditionally not interested in survivalist themes. Sara Nelson of The Daily Beast referred to the novel as "The Most Dangerous Novel in America."

The Kirkus Review described the series as "long on details about guns, survival techniques and military capabilities and short on the suspense".

== Translations ==
The first translation of Patriots was released in May 2012. This was a Spanish and French edition, titled Patriotas. It was translated by Ernesto Rubio Garcia and published by La Factoria De Ideas, in Madrid, Spain. ISBN 8498007704.

== Sequels ==
Rawles authored four sequels in the Patriots series. The first two sequels were published by Simon & Schuster: Survivors: A Novel of the Coming Collapse in 2011 and Founders: A Novel of the Coming Collapse in 2012. Both of these sequels were also produced as audiobooks (by Brilliance Audio), and as e-books. In 2013, E.P. Dutton released the fourth novel in the series, titled Expatriates. This sequel is set primarily in Australia, the Philippines, and Tavares, Florida. This was followed in 2014 by a fourth sequel, titled Liberators: A Novel of the Coming Global Collapse. It was released on October 21, 2014.

Sales for the sequels were strong, with Survivors, Founders and Expatriates all achieving places on The New York Times Best Seller list.

=== Survivors: A Novel of the Coming Collapse ===
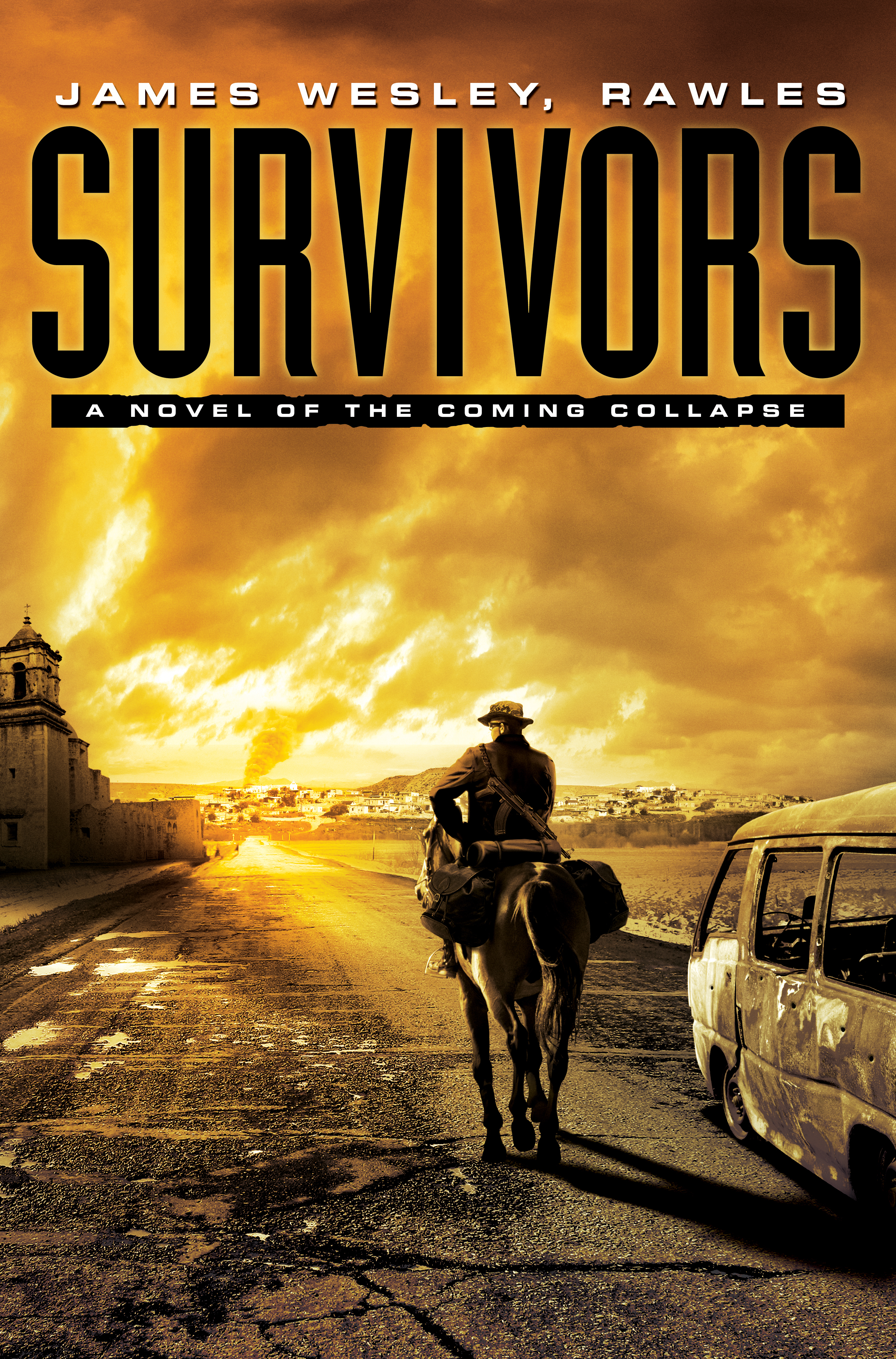
Cover of the first edition of Survivors.

Much of Survivors: A Novel of the Coming Collapse takes place in the Four Corners region, specifically in and around Bloomfield and Farmington, New Mexico, although the book's climax takes place in and near Prescott, Arizona and several sub-plots take place as far away as Afghanistan. The cover artwork was created by Tony Mauro Jr.

On its release day, October 4, 2011, Survivors rose to #2 in Amazon's overall book sales ranks and #1 in their action-adventure category. On October 23, 2011, it was listed at #3 in the New York Times bestseller list in the fiction hardback category. Rawles and Survivors were the centerpiece of a Vancouver Sun article by Kim Murphy about the American Redoubt movement that was run by dozens of newspapers, including the Los Angeles Times. Marvin Olasky of World magazine called Survivors "...not as well-written as some articles Rawles has penned"

Rawles uses an unusual contemporaneous approach to writing sequels. Rather than the traditional formula of following the same group of characters farther into the future, he instead uses a novel sequence method that portrays different characters in different geographic regions, but in the same near-future timeframe as in Patriots. In his Introductory note to Survivors, Rawles stated: "Unlike most novel sequels, the storyline of Survivors is contemporaneous with the events described in my previously-published novel Patriots. Thus, there is no need to read it first (or subsequently), but you'll likely find it entertaining."

The first of several translations of Survivors was released in May 2014. This was a Spanish edition, titled Supervivientes. It was translated by Ernesto Rubio Garcia and published by La Factoria De Ideas, in Madrid, Spain. ISBN 978-8490182734. A Kindle edition in Spanish was also released in May, 2014. Additional translations into French, German, Russian, Bulgarian, Portuguese, and Korean are planned.

=== Founders: A Novel of the Coming Collapse ===
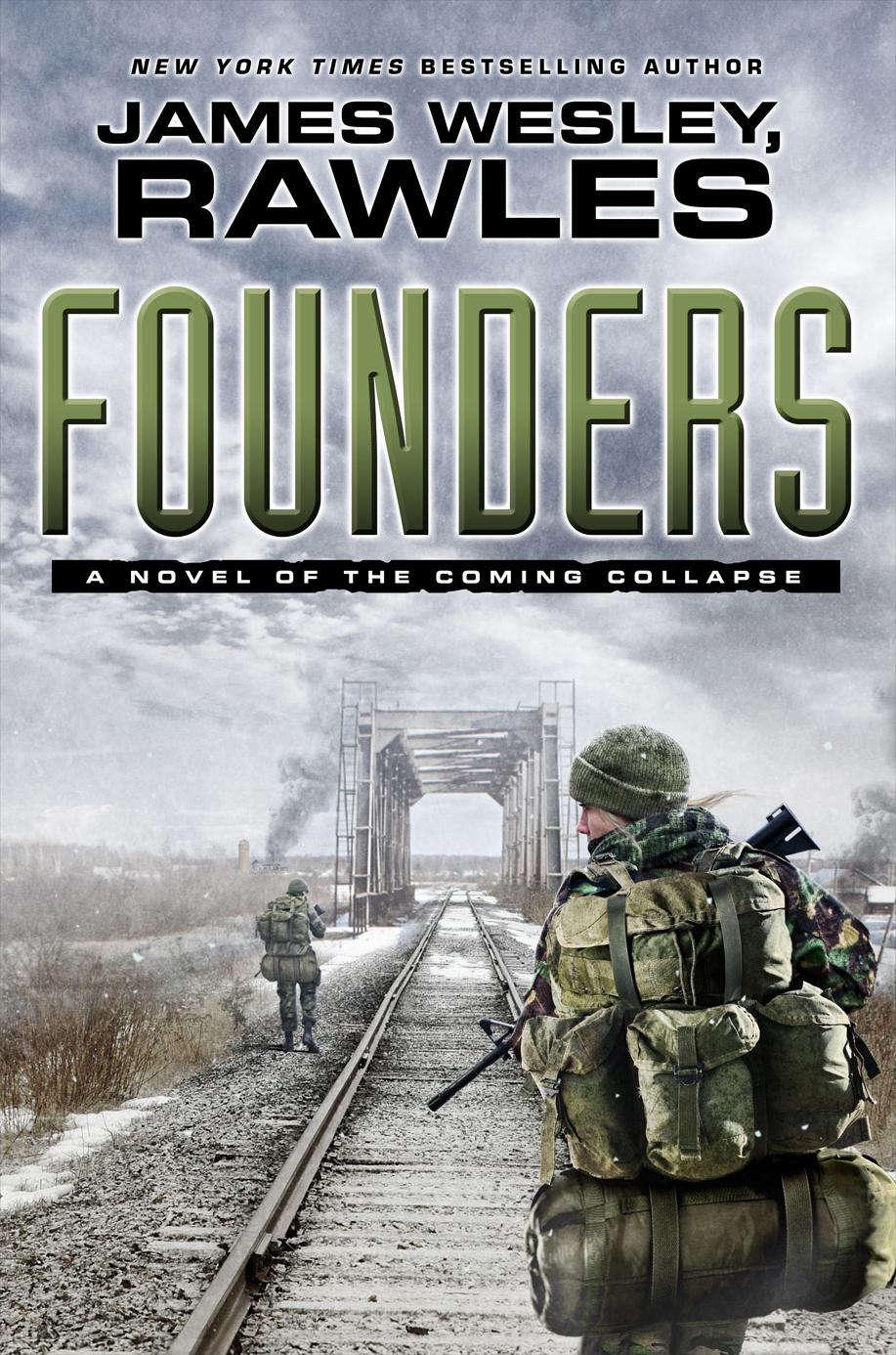
Cover of the first edition of Founders.

Founders: A Novel of the Coming Collapse is a 2012 New York Times best-selling novel by author James Wesley Rawles and is a sequel to Survivors: A Novel of the Coming Collapse. The novel was released on September 25, 2012, by Atria Books. The book peaked at #4 in Amazon's overall book sales ranks, on its release day. The book premiered on the New York Times Bestsellers list at #11, but dropped to #27 a week later.

Founders: A Novel of the Coming Collapse is set primarily in Kentucky, Tennessee, and Montana. It details how U.S. Army Captain Andy Laine infiltrates the Provisional Government's New Army headquartered at Fort Knox in the midst of a War of Resistance. It also details the cross-country trek of Ken and Terry Layton, and introduces a new character: Joshua Watanabe, a U.S. Air Force NCO, stationed at Malmstrom Air Force Base, in Montana. The cover artwork was created by Tony Mauro Jr.

Founders was released on September 25, 2012, by Atria Books. The book premiered on the New York Times Bestsellers list at #11, but dropped to #27 a week later.

In his brief review of Founders, Gregory Cowles of the influential The New York Times Book Review poked fun at the comma in Rawles's name, but granted: "Rawles is a well-known survivalist, and he's surely the only writer on this list whose fans frequently ask him how best to stockpile food (it depends on which food) or whether to favor bullets over gold during the total collapse of civilization ("You can't defend yourself near as well with a Krugerrand")."

=== Expatriates: A Novel of the Coming Global Collapse ===
The third sequel in the Patriots series is entitled Expatriates: A Novel of the Coming Global Collapse (ISBN 9780525953906). It was written under contract for E.P. Dutton. The book was released on October 1, 2013. It is set "primarily in central Florida, the Philippines, and northern Australia." The cover artwork was created by Tony Mauro Jr. The audio book was narrated by Eric G. Dove. The publisher's web page summarizes the storyline: "When the United States suffers a major socioeconomic collapse, a power vacuum sweeps the globe. A newly radicalized Islamic government rises to power in Indonesia, invades the Philippines, East Timor, Papua New Guinea, and finally northern Australia. No longer protected by American military interests, Australia must repel an invasion alone."

=== Liberators: A Novel of the Coming Global Collapse ===
The fourth and final sequel in the Patriots novel series is a 416-page book entitled Liberators: A Novel of the Coming Global Collapse. It was released on October 21, 2014. This sequel was written under contract for E.P. Dutton. It is set primarily in the Bella Coola region of western Canada.

Reviews of Liberators were also positive. Publishers Weekly called Liberators the "rousing fifth after-the-apocalypse thriller [installment in the novel series]" and also mentioned that "Supporters of the 'prepper' movement…will lap up every detail." Jeff Soyer of North Country Review of Books gave the novel a three star rating overall, and a four star rating for Writing Style. Mark Rubinstein of The Huffington Post called the book "[A]nother entertaining and thought-provoking novel, describing steps people can take in the event of a global collapse." In a radio interview on October 20, 2014, Alan Colmes mentioned that the novel's title indicates that Rawles actually expects an economic collapse in the near future, and Rawles confirmed that because of uncontrolled government spending and indebtedness he does indeed anticipate a collapse. The novel debuted at #48 in Amazon.com's overall rankings, #1 in their Science Fiction-Dystopian novels category, #1 in their Mystery novels category, and at #1 in their Action & Adventure, War & Military novels category. The novel premiered at #20 on the Publishers Weekly hardcover bestsellers list, reported on November 3, 2014.

=== Counter-Caliphate Chronicles novel series ===
Rawles followed Patriots series with the Counter-Caliphate Chronicles novel series. On December 1, 2015, Rawles released the novel Land of Promise, the first book in the Counter-Caliphate Chronicles novel series. This science fiction novel is a geopolitical thriller that is a considerable departure from his previous Patriots thriller novel series. Set in the late 2130s, Land of Promise fictionally describes the world under the economic and military domination of a Global Islamic Caliphate, brought about by a fictional new branch of Islam, called The Thirdists. The novel also describes the establishment of a Christian nation of refuge called The Ilemi Republic, in East Africa. It is the first release from Liberty Paradigm Publishing, a publishing venture launched by Rawles in partnership with his literary agent Robert Gottlieb of Trident Media Group.

== Printing history ==
- The Gray Nineties (19 chapter draft). Distributed as shareware from 1995 to 1997.
- Triple Ought (27 chapter draft). Distributed as shareware from 1997 to 1998.
- TEOTWAWKI: The End of the World as We Know It. 33 chapters with six appendices, self-published edition, The Clearwater Press, Kooskia, Idaho, Velo-bound, 1997–1998.
- Patriots: Surviving the Coming Collapse. 31 chapters, 342 pages, abridged trade paperback edition from Huntington House/Vital Issues Press. It was in print from November 1998 to January 2005.
- Patriots: Surviving the Coming Collapse. 33 chapters, 384 pages trade paperback from XLibris. It was in print from November 2006 to February 2009.
- Patriots: A Novel of Survival in the Coming Collapse. 33 chapters, 398 pages, updated trade paperback edition with glossary and index, from Ulysses Press, Berkeley, California.
- Patriots: A Novel of Survival in the Coming Collapse—Unabridged Audiobook was released on December 31, 2009. This audiobook, from Brilliance Audiobooks was narrated by Dick Hill.
- Patriots: A Novel of Survival in the Coming Collapse. 33 chapters, 400 pages, revised edition in hardback with a glossary and index, from Ulysses Press, Berkeley, California, November, 2012.
