= Troy, Idaho =

- City
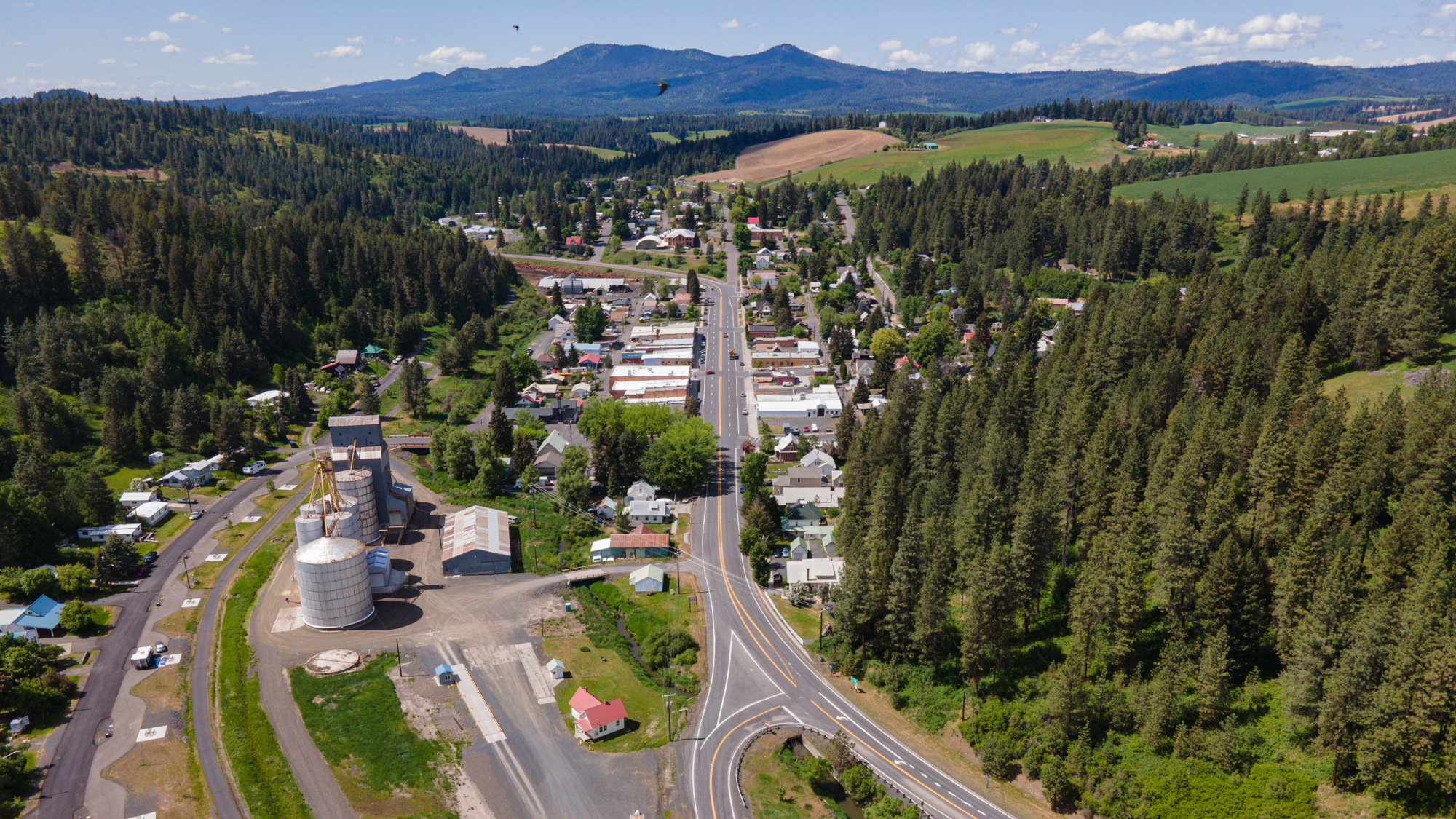
- Aerial view of Troy from the southeast

- Location of Troy in Latah County, Idaho.
- Coordinates: 46°44′17″N 116°46′23″W
- Country: United States
- State: Idaho
- County: Latah

Area
  - Total: 0.79 sq mi (2.05 km^{2})
  - Land: 0.79 sq mi (2.05 km^{2})
  - Water: 0 sq mi (0.00 km^{2})
- Elevation: 2,543 ft (775 m)

Population (2020)
  - Total: 890
  - Density: 1,131.2/sq mi (436.77/km^{2})
- Time zone: UTC-8 (Pacific (PST))
  - Summer (DST): UTC-7 (PDT)
- ZIP code: 83871
- Area code: 208
- FIPS code: 16-82360
- GNIS feature ID: 2412099
- Website: www.cityoftroy.net

Troy is a city in Latah County, Idaho, United States. Located in the eastern part of the Palouse region, its population was 890 at the 2020 census.

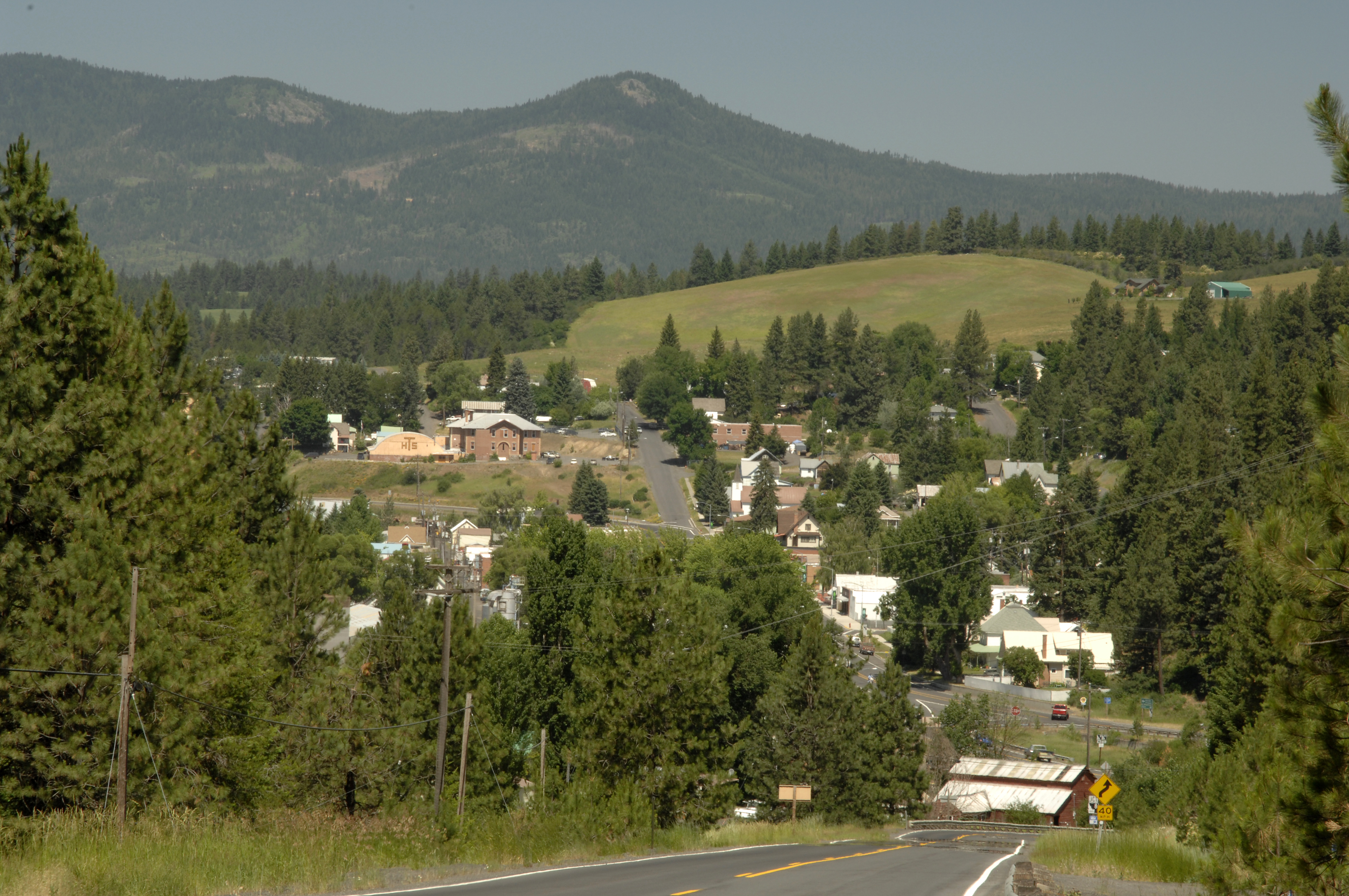
South entrance to Troy

== History ==
The community was originally known as Huffs Gulch when J. Wesley Seat homesteaded in the area in 1885. In 1890, area businessman John P. Vollmer rechristened the area with his own surname when he brought the railroad through. Vollmer gained much of his 30,000 acres (47 sq mi; 120 km^{2}) of land by foreclosing on the bank loans of local farmers. This made him so unpopular that in 1897, the residents decided to rename the town. Local legend states that the name Troy was selected when a Greek railroad worker offered free shots of whiskey to any who would support the name.

== Geography ==
According to the United States Census Bureau, the city has a total area of 0.79 square miles (2.05 km^{2}), all of it land.

== Demographics ==
Historical population
Census	Pop.	Note	%±
1900	283		—
1910	543		91.9%
1920	591		8.8%
1930	619		4.7%
1940	580		−6.3%
1950	531		−8.4%
1960	555		4.5%
1970	541		−2.5%
1980	820		51.6%
1990	699		−14.8%
2000	798		14.2%
2010	862		8.0%
2020	890		3.2%
2019 (est.)	895		3.8%
U.S. Decennial Census

=== 2020 census estimates ===
As of the census estimates of 2020, Troy had a population of 895 people (53 of which are recognized military veterans; an observed 12.2% increase since 2000) and 321 housing units in the city's boundaries. 85.8% of residents are expected to have a broadband Internet subscription, 98.8% of current residents are estimated to have completed education at the high-school level or higher, and just 2.4% of the population are predicted to be living without health insurance. The median resident age is 34.6 years, slightly lower than the statewide median age of 36.9 years.

=== 2010 census ===
As of the census of 2010, there were 862 people, 324 households, and 242 families residing in the city. The population density was 1,091.1 inhabitants per square mile (421.3/km^{2}). There were 355 housing units at an average density of 449.4 per square mile (173.5/km^{2}). The racial makeup of the city was 96.1% White, 0.2% Native American, 0.6% Asian, 0.5% from other races, and 2.7% from two or more races. Hispanic or Latino of any race were 3.0% of the population.

There were 324 households, of which 38.6% had children under the age of 18 living with them, 63.9% were married couples living together, 5.6% had a female householder with no husband present, 5.2% had a male householder with no wife present, and 25.3% were non-families. 20.4% of all households were made up of individuals, and 8.4% had someone living alone who was 65 years of age or older. The average household size was 2.66, and the average family size was 3.10.

The median age in the city was 37.9 years. 29% of residents were under the age of 18; 5.1% were between the ages of 18 and 24; 28.4% were from 25 to 44; 26.1% were from 45 to 64; and 11.4% were 65 years of age or older. The gender makeup of the city was 49.8% male and 50.2% female.

=== 2000 census ===
As of the census of 2000, there were 798 people, 309 households, and 224 families residing in the city. The population density was 1,004.8 inhabitants per square mile (388.0/km^{2}). There were 341 housing units at an average density of 429.4 per square mile (165.8/km^{2}). The racial makeup of the city was 96.12% White, 0.50% Native American, 0.38% Asian, and 3.01% from two or more races. Hispanic or Latino of any race were 0.13% of the population.

There were 309 households, out of which 38.5% had children under the age of 18 living with them, 61.2% were married couples living together, 7.8% had a female householder with no husband present, and 27.2% were non-families. 20.7% of all households were made up of individuals, and 7.8% had someone living alone who was 65 years of age or older. The average household size was 2.58, and the average family size was 3.02.

In the city, the population was spread out, with 29.8% under the age of 18, 7.1% from 18 to 24, 29.2% from 25 to 44, 22.4% from 45 to 64, and 11.4% who were 65 years of age or older. The median age was 34 years. For every 100 females, there were 99.5 males. For every 100 females age 18 and over, there were 92.4 males.

The median income for a household in the city was $36,250, and the median income for a family was $42,031. Males had a median income of $33,194 versus $23,295 for females. The per capita income for the city was $16,557. About 11.9% of families and 12.1% of the population were below the poverty line, including 14.7% of those under age 18 and 3.1% of those age 65 or over.

== Education ==
Public education is provided by the Troy School District (#287). The current Troy High School is a combined Junior and Senior high school that opened in 2003. The previous building dated back to 1906. The Trojans compete in athletics in the White Pine League in IHSAA Class 1A (Div I).

== Infrastructure ==
- - SH-8 - to Moscow and Pullman (west) and Deary, Bovill, and Elk River (east)
- - SH-99 - to Kendrick, Julietta and Lewiston (south)

For bicyclists and pedestrians, the Latah Trail is a paved rail trail near Highway 8 that connects Troy to Moscow and Pullman, Washington. It meets the Paradise Path in Moscow, which continues west as the Bill Chipman Palouse Trail to Pullman alongside Highway 270; the total length of the three trails from Troy to Pullman is 22 miles (35 km). Access to the trail in Troy is permitted at the west corner of Troy City Park.

== Notable people ==
John H. Hays – Medal of Honor recipient and town marshal killed in action in 1904.
