= Bill Chipman Palouse Trail =

Rail trail in Idaho and Washington, United States

Coordinates: 46.7324°N 117.0255°W

- Length: 7 miles (11 km)
- Established: April 4, 1998; 28 years ago
- Trailheads: Moscow, Idaho and Pullman, Washington, U.S.
- Use: Biking, in-line skating, hiking
- Elevation change: 180 feet (55 m)
- Highest point: 2,535 feet (773 m)
- Lowest point: 2,355 feet (718 m)
- Grade: 0.5%
- Difficulty: Easy
- Season: All
- Months: 12
- Sights: Palouse, Paradise Creek
- Surface: Asphalt
- Right of way: Palouse River Railroad, formerly Union Pacific

The BCPT connects Pullman, Washington and Moscow, Idaho

The Bill Chipman Palouse Trail is a paved rail trail in the northwestern United States, from Pullman, Washington, eastward to Moscow, Idaho. Completed 28 years ago in 1998, it follows the former Union Pacific Railroad right-of-way and connects the rural university towns on the Palouse across the state border.

== Route ==
From Pullman, the trail's seven-mile (11 km) route gently climbs eastward along Paradise Creek, crossing it twelve times on original railroad bridges. The elevation at its highest point, the eastern terminus at the Perimeter Road trailhead in Idaho, is 2,535 feet (773 m) above sea level and the vertical drop westward to Pullman is 180 feet (55 m). The trail has two rest areas, three emergency phones, and multiple interpretive areas. It is south of and parallel to State Route 270, the Moscow-Pullman Highway, which becomes State Highway 8 in Idaho. The BCPT is not only a recreational facility, but also a commuter route that connects the land-grant campuses of the University of Idaho and Washington State University.

=== Trail connections ===
The Bill Chipman Palouse Trail ends 0.8 miles (1.3 km) into Idaho at the UI's Perimeter Road, but the trail continues eastward. It connects with the Paradise Path, which spans two miles (3 km) through the north and east edges of the UI campus and to the east edge of the Moscow city limits, where it seamlessly connects with the Latah Trail at Carmichael Road.

The Latah Trail travels twelve miles (20 km) east to the small city of Troy at 2,487 feet (758 m). Completed in October 2008, the ten-foot-wide (3 m) trail was paved in stages over a six-year period. It parallels Highway 8, the Troy Highway, for most of its length, separating to the north a few miles outside of Troy. All three trails follow former rail corridors and result in a total length of 22 miles (35 km) from Pullman to Troy.

== History ==
Trailheads in Pullman and Moscow

After 12 years of community efforts and donations, along with agency cooperation, the Bill Chipman Palouse Trail was dedicated on April 4, 1998. It is part of the federal Rails to Trails program, which preserves railroad corridors for non-motorized transportation and possible future transportation use. It is open dawn to dusk year round – day use only – and to all ages and abilities. The trail is maintained and managed by a coalition of park and trail representatives from Whitman County, the cities of Pullman and Moscow, the University of Idaho, and Washington State University. With non-motorized traffic transferred to the BCPT, the highway was later improved and widened to five lanes (two lanes in each direction with a center dividing lane), completed in spring 2008.

The extended time frame for completion of the BCPT was because the railroad was not yet abandoned. Two rail lines ran between Moscow and Pullman and the issue was which to consolidate upon. The former U.P. line, operated by the Palouse River Railroad, ran along Paradise Creek, south of and parallel to Highway 270. Further south, the BNSF line arcs southwest from the state line to follow Sunshine Creek and then the old highway to Pullman Junction. When it was agreed that the BNSF route would remain, the old U.P. route was removed, beginning in October 1996.

The U.P. line between the cities was first constructed in 1885 as the Columbia and Palouse Railroad, which later became part of the Oregon Railroad and Navigation Company.
