= Elk River, Idaho =

- City
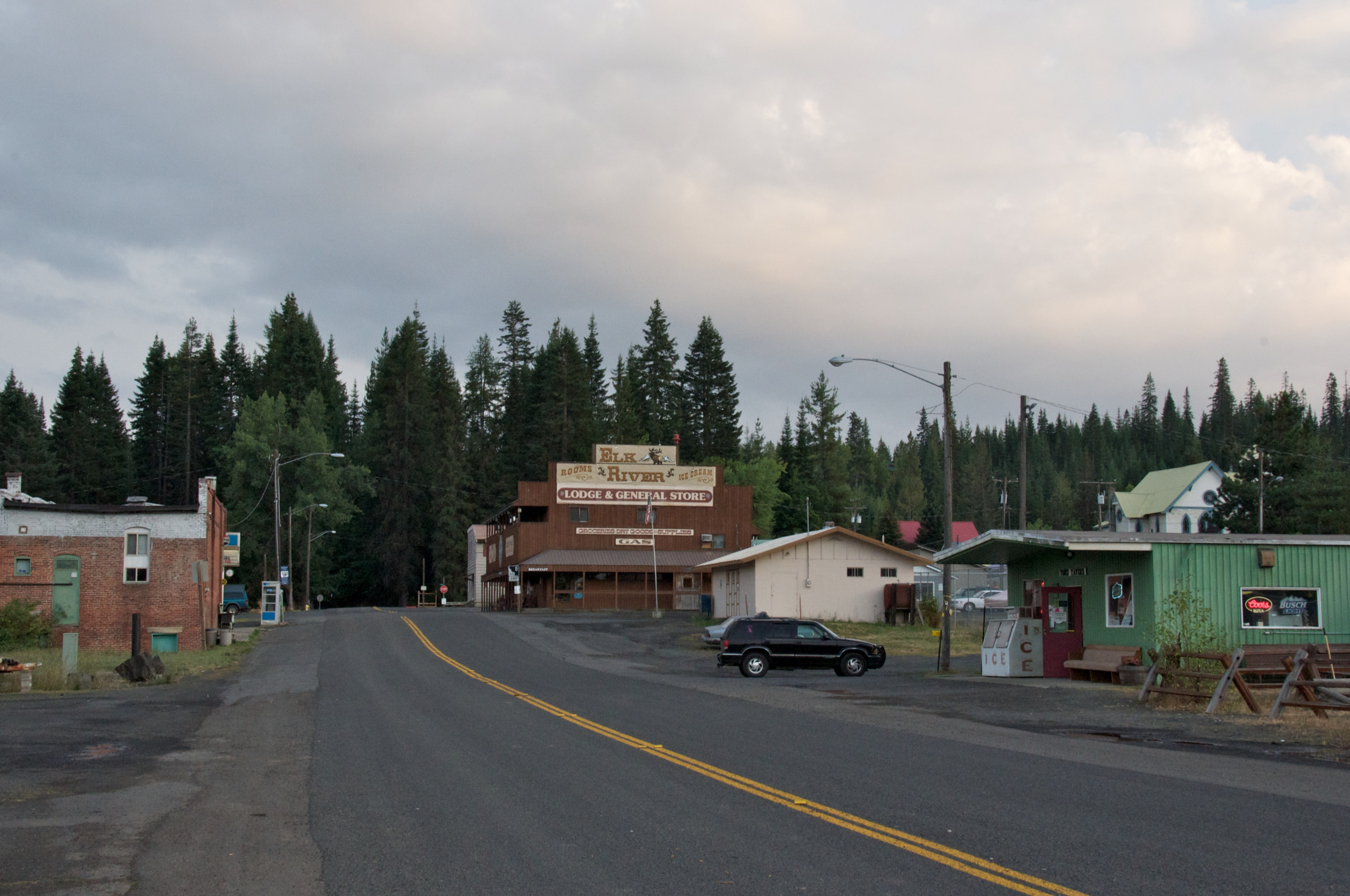
- South First Street in 2011

- Location of Elk River in Clearwater County, Idaho.
- Coordinates: 46°46′59″N 116°10′52″W
- Country: United States
- State: Idaho
- County: Clearwater

Area
  - Total: 0.15 sq mi (0.38 km^{2})
  - Land: 0.15 sq mi (0.38 km^{2})
  - Water: 0 sq mi (0.00 km^{2})
- Elevation: 2,861 ft (872 m)

Population (2020)
  - Total: 139
  - Density: 950/sq mi (370/km^{2})
- Time zone: UTC-8 (Pacific (PST))
  - Summer (DST): UTC-7 (PDT)
- ZIP code: 83827
- Area code: 208
- FIPS code: 16-25120
- GNIS feature ID: 2410427
- Website: cityelkriver.org

Elk River is a city in the northwestern United States in Clearwater County, Idaho. The population was 139 at the 2020 census, up from 125 in 2010. It is accessed from State Highway 8 from Bovill, to the west in adjacent Latah County. Formerly the site of a Potlatch sawmill, it was phased out after several decades during the 1930s.

== Geography ==
According to the United States Census Bureau, the city has a total area of 0.15 square miles (0.39 km^{2}), all of it land.

=== Climate ===
This region experiences warm (but not hot) and dry summers, with no average monthly temperatures above 71.6 °F (22 °C). According to the Köppen Climate Classification system, Elk River has a dry-summer humid continental climate, abbreviated "Dsb" on climate maps.

Climate data for Elk River (1952-2012)
| Month | Jan | Feb | Mar | Apr | May | Jun | Jul | Aug | Sep | Oct | Nov | Dec | Year |
|---|---|---|---|---|---|---|---|---|---|---|---|---|---|
| Record high °F (°C) | 54 (12) | 63 (17) | 72 (22) | 87 (31) | 95 (35) | 96 (36) | 104 (40) | 107 (42) | 100 (38) | 88 (31) | 66 (19) | 58 (14) | 107 (42) |
| Mean daily maximum °F (°C) | 34.1 (1.2) | 39.7 (4.3) | 45.8 (7.7) | 54 (12) | 63.8 (17.7) | 71.4 (21.9) | 81.5 (27.5) | 81.5 (27.5) | 72 (22) | 58.3 (14.6) | 42 (6) | 34 (1) | 56.5 (13.6) |
| Mean daily minimum °F (°C) | 18.3 (−7.6) | 20.5 (−6.4) | 24.2 (−4.3) | 30.4 (−0.9) | 36.7 (2.6) | 43 (6) | 45.7 (7.6) | 44.2 (6.8) | 37.5 (3.1) | 30.6 (−0.8) | 25.6 (−3.6) | 19.6 (−6.9) | 31.4 (−0.3) |
| Record low °F (°C) | −31 (−35) | −25 (−32) | −23 (−31) | 11 (−12) | 19 (−7) | 27 (−3) | 26 (−3) | 27 (−3) | 20 (−7) | 4 (−16) | −24 (−31) | −37 (−38) | −37 (−38) |
| Average precipitation inches (mm) | 5.37 (136) | 3.98 (101) | 3.4 (86) | 2.9 (74) | 2.89 (73) | 2.48 (63) | 1.04 (26) | 1.1 (28) | 1.67 (42) | 2.76 (70) | 4.74 (120) | 5.05 (128) | 37.38 (949) |
| Average snowfall inches (cm) | 30.1 (76) | 16.8 (43) | 11.5 (29) | 2.7 (6.9) | 0.3 (0.76) | 0 (0) | 0 (0) | 0 (0) | 0 (0) | 0.3 (0.76) | 11.9 (30) | 25.4 (65) | 99 (250) |
| Average precipitation days | 16 | 12 | 12 | 11 | 11 | 10 | 5 | 5 | 6 | 10 | 14 | 14 | 126 |
Source: WRCC

== Demographics ==
Historical population
| Census | Pop. | Note | %± |
|---|---|---|---|
| 1920 | 847 | | — |
| 1930 | 862 | | 1.8% |
| 1940 | 337 | | −60.9% |
| 1950 | 312 | | −7.4% |
| 1960 | 382 | | 22.4% |
| 1970 | 383 | | 0.3% |
| 1980 | 265 | | −30.8% |
| 1990 | 149 | | −43.8% |
| 2000 | 156 | | 4.7% |
| 2010 | 125 | | −19.9% |
| 2020 | 139 | | 11.2% |
U.S. Decennial Census

=== 2010 census ===
As of the census of 2010, there were 125 people, 65 households, and 31 families residing in the city. The population density was 833.3 inhabitants per square mile (321.7/km^{2}). There were 152 housing units at an average density of 1,013.3 units per square mile (391.2 units/km^{2}). The racial makeup of the city was 100.0% White. Hispanic or Latino of any race were 3.2% of the population.

There were 65 households, of which 9.2% had children under the age of 18 living with them, 46.2% were married couples living together, 1.5% had a female householder with no husband present, and 52.3% were non-families. 50.8% of all households were made up of individuals, and 20% had someone living alone who was 65 years of age or older. The average household size was 1.92 and the average family size was 2.90.

The median age in the city was 52.4 years. 12.8% of residents were under the age of 18; 2.4% were between the ages of 18 and 24; 19.2% were from 25 to 44; 44% were from 45 to 64; and 21.6% were 65 years of age or older. The gender makeup of the city was 52.8% male and 47.2% female.

=== 2000 census ===
As of the 2000 census, there were 156 people, 75 households, and 54 families residing in the city. The population density was 1,116.6 inhabitants per square mile (431.1/km^{2}). There were 136 housing units at an average density of 973.5 units per square mile (375.9 units/km^{2}). The racial makeup of the city was 95.51% White, 0.64% Asian, and 3.85% from two or more races. Hispanic or Latino of any race were 0.64% of the population.

There were 75 households, out of which 13.3% had children under the age of 18 living with them, 66.7% were married couples living together, 2.7% had a female householder with no husband present, and 26.7% were non-families. 21.3% of all households were made up of individuals, and 8.0% had someone living alone who was 65 years of age or older. The average household size was 2.08 and the average family size was 2.38.

In the city, the population was spread out, with 13.5% under the age of 18, 1.9% from 18 to 24, 19.2% from 25 to 44, 41.0% from 45 to 64, and 24.4% who were 65 years of age or older. The median age was 53 years. For every 100 females, there were 116.7 males. For every 100 females age 18 and over, there were 107.7 males.

The median income for a household in the city was $30,000, and the median income for a family was $31,250. Males had a median income of $29,375 versus $17,500 for females. The per capita income for the city was $16,082. About 11.3% of families and 14.1% of the population were below the poverty line, including 27.8% of those under the age of eighteen and 8.9% of those 65 or over.

== Education ==
The public school was closed 36 years ago in 1990 and students attend classes in Bovill in Latah County.

== In popular culture ==
In 2011, John Oliver and Andy Zaltzman of satirical podcast The Bugle claimed to be planning to declare war against the town. In December 2017, The Bugle recognized Elk River as the capital of the United States, following the Trump administration's announcement of plans to relocate the US embassy in Israel from Tel Aviv to Jerusalem.
