= Idaho State Highway 99 =

State highway in Idaho

State Highway 99
- SH-99 highlighted in red

Route information
- Maintained by ITD
- Length: 11.686 mi (18.807 km)

Major junctions
- South end: SH-3 in Kendrick
- North end: SH-8 in Troy

Location
- Country: United States
- State: Idaho
- Counties: Latah

Highway system
- Idaho State Highway System; Interstate; US; State
← SH-97	→ SH-128

State Highway 99 (SH-99) is a state highway in Idaho that travels from SH-3 in Kendrick to SH-8 in Troy. The highway is approximately 11.7 miles (18.8 km) in length.

== Route description ==
Idaho State Highway 99 begins at an intersection with Idaho State Highway 3 in the community of Kendrick. The highway proceeds northeast, exiting Kendrick, and proceeding into rural area. The highway weaves northeast and northwest for several miles, before bending northwest. The route continues through a small valley, intersecting several small roads while traveling. The roadway proceeds northward before making a large bend northwest, and entering the community of Troy. The highway continues to its northern terminus, an intersection with Idaho State Highway 8.

== Major intersections ==
The entire route is in Latah County.

Location	mi	km	Destinations	Notes
Kendrick	0.000	0.000	SH-3	Southern end
Troy	11.686	18.807	SH-8	Northern end
1.000 mi = 1.609 km; 1.000 km = 0.621 mi
