= Hotel Bovill =

Historic place in Idaho, United States

- U.S. National Register of Historic Places
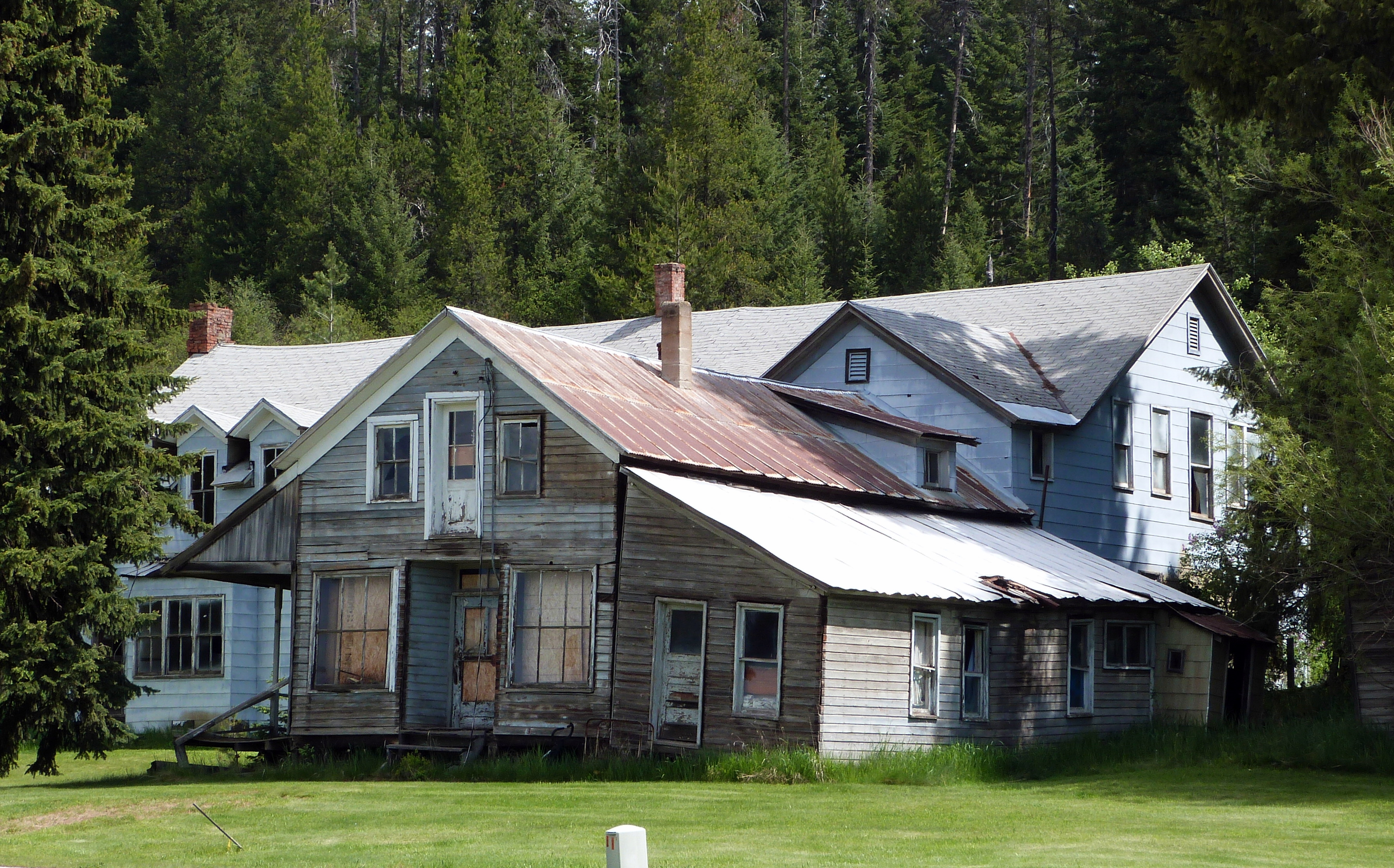
- Hotel Bovill in 2015
- Location: 602 Park Street; Bovill, Idaho, U.S.
- Coordinates: 46°51′39″N 116°23′47″W
- Built: 1903
- NRHP reference No.: 94000629
- Added to NRHP: June 23, 1994

The Hotel Bovill is a former hotel in Bovill, Latah County, Idaho, United States. It was constructed in 1903 by Hugh Bovill, an English settler and son of Sir William Bovill, Chief Justice of the Common Pleas. Hugh and his wife, Charlotte, operated the house as a hotel from 1903 to 1911, serving tourists and loggers. In addition to lodging, the hotel also housed a store, and was a hub for local commerce in the community.

Disillusioned with the growing presence of the timber industry in Bovill and the destruction of the area's forests, the Bovill family left the property around 1911. They would return in the early 1930s with an unsuccessful attempt at reviving the hotel, before permanently leaving it behind. The structure would continue to serve as a lodging building for timber workers through the majority of the 20th century, until the 1980s.

The Hotel Bovill was added to the National Register of Historic Places in 1994. At the time, it was noted that the property was vacant and in an increasing state of dilapidation.

== History ==
A log cabin homestead was established in Bovill in 1891 by Francis Warren. This cabin was subsequently purchased by English settler Hugh Bovill in 1899, who relocated the cabin to the site of the Hotel Bovill. Bovill was the son of Sir William Bovill, an English lawyer and Chief Justice of the Common Pleas. In 1884, Hugh married Charlotte (née Robinson), the daughter of a Canon in York Minister and Commissioner of Education under Queen Victoria, and the couple moved into the cabin at the Hotel Bovill site. Within the next four years, the two-story structure was built, complete with decorative millwork and gabled peaks, with ornate porch railings and columns. In 1903, the structure was known locally as "Headquarters."

Between 1903 and 1911, an adjacent store was constructed on the property, in addition to expansion of the main home, followed by a shed which functioned as the city's post office. The modifications to the main home in 1911 united the store and main house into a single building, and the front porch was expanded to continuously span the length of the building, with drop siding added to the structure. Circa this period, the house began to function as a hotel, and was named Hotel Bovill.

The hotel facility was the sole supply and lodging center in the Bovill area for both tourists and timber prospectors. The Bovill family continued to live in the home and served as proprietors of the lodgers. Charlotte Bovill gained local notoriety for her "wilderness cuisine" served to lodgers, which included huckleberry pie, roasted bear, venison, homemade rhubarb wine, and ginger beer.

Around 1911, the Bovill family were dismayed by the "ravaged" forests and influx of logging in the area, which prompted them to relocate to Coeur d'Alene, leaving behind a reported $150,000 worth of property. In the early 1930s, the Bovills returned to the hotel during the Civilian Conservation Corps-era, unsuccessfully hoping to reopen the hotel, before leaving the property permanently. Hugh Bovill died in Newport, Oregon in 1935, and Charlotte in Santa Cruz, California, in 1946.

In the 1950s, the original wooden foundation was replaced with concrete blocks, and a composition shingle roof was added to prevent further deterioration of the structure. For the majority of the latter half of the 20th century, the Hotel Bovill continued to function as a hotel, primarily for loggers and other timber industry workers.

== Status and preservation ==
In 1994, the property was added to the National Register of Historic Places. It was noted in the May 1994 NRHP application:

The physical decline and somewhat diminished architectural values of the Hotel Bovill are far exceeded by its still-visible historical role in the larger community. It is certainly the single, most important property of its type in the local area. Hugh and Charlotte Bovril's vision and service to the commercial and recreational interests in the area were unprecedented. What began as a graceful, tourist interlude, grudgingly aided the aggressive logging industry which remains a strong force hi the region today.

At the time of its NRHP listing, the property was vacant and in a state of increasing dilapidation. In a 2007 article published by the Moscow-Pullman Daily News, it was noted that the hotel "stood in ruins on the hillside."

== See also ==
- National Register of Historic Places listings in Latah County, Idaho

== Works cited ==
- Farah, Michelle (1994). McCroskey, Lauren (ed.). "National Register of Historic Places Registration Form: Hotel Bovill" (PDF). United States Department of the Interior (National Park Service) – via History.Idaho.gov.
