= Penny Bovell =

Australian artist (born 1956)

Penny Bovell (born 1956) is a Western Australian artist. In 1999, Bovell received a master's degree in Fine Art from the University of Western Australia, Perth, following her completion in 1993 of a postgraduate diploma in Visual Arts from Curtin University.

She has exhibited regularly, as well as lectured in studio practice and art history at the University of Western Australia and Curtin University in Perth.

Bovell's artwork is in major public collections such as:

- the National Gallery of Australia, Canberra
- Parliament House, Canberra
- the Art Gallery of Western Australia, Perth
- Wesfarmers

as well as numerous private and corporate collections.
