= Bovill Opera House =

- U.S. National Register of Historic Places
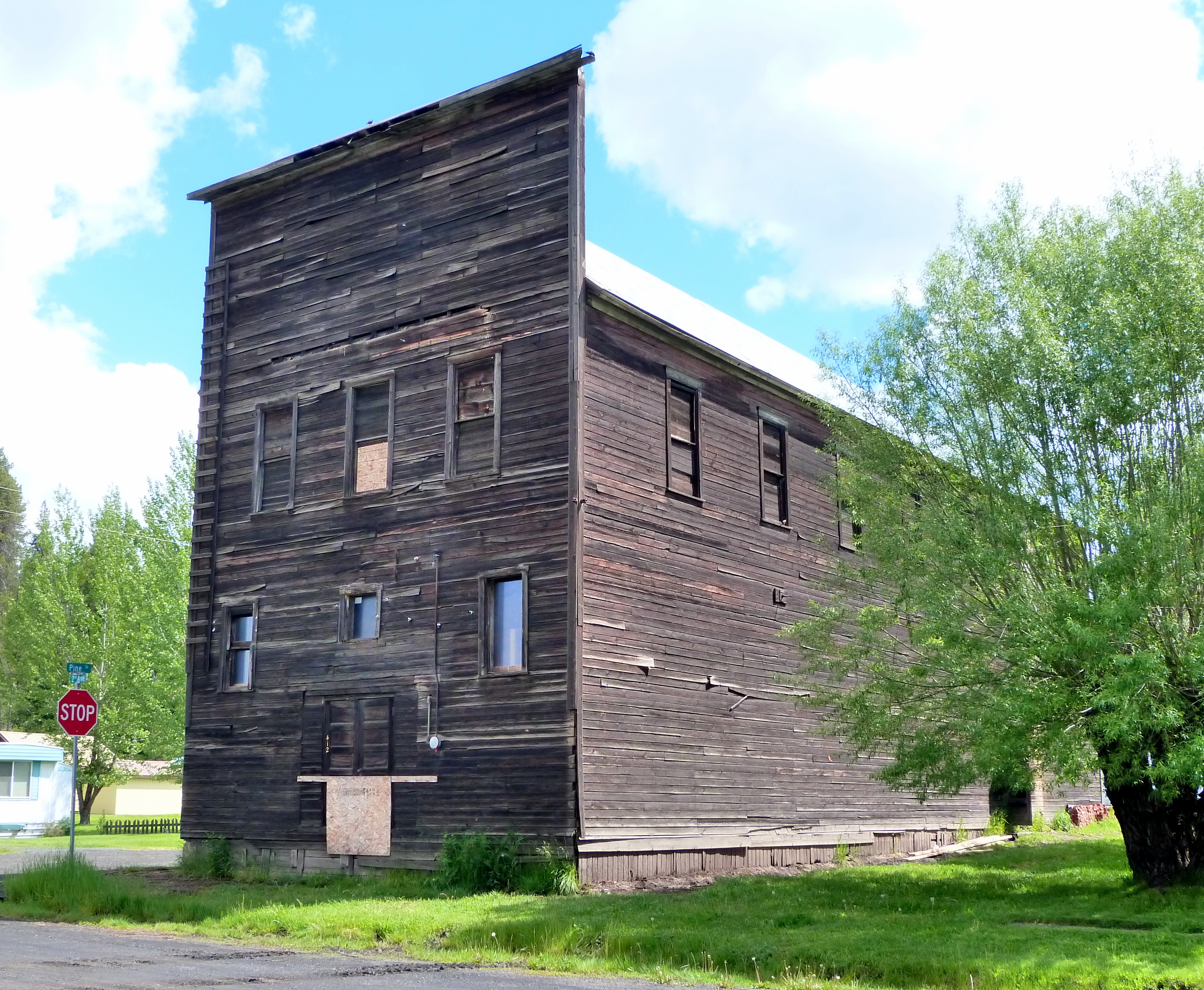
- The building's exterior in 2015

- Location within Idaho
- Location: 412 2nd Avenue; Bovill, Idaho
- Coordinates: 46°51′34.15″N 116°23′41.76″W
- Area: less than 1 acre (0.40 ha)
- MPS: Motion Picture Theater Buildings in Idaho MPS
- NRHP reference No.: 09001280
- Added to NRHP: January 27, 2010

The Bovill Opera House in Bovill, Latah County, Idaho, is a theatre believed to have been built in the first decade of the 20th century. It is currently listed on the National Register of Historic Places.

According to the National Park Service:

Believed to have been built in the first decade of the 20th century, the Bovill Opera House served for five decades as the entertainment and social center for the town of Bovill and its surrounding communities. Although used primarily as a "moving picture hall", the Bovill Opera House hosted dances, performances, as well as public hearings and gatherings. In the 1930s the upstairs was transformed into a miniature golf course and later used as a roller skating-rink. While there is a metal sign reading "Bovill Historical Museum" it was apparently never used as a museum on a consistent basis.

The building was listed on the U.S. National Register of Historic Places on January 27, 2010. The listing was announced as the featured listing in the National Park Service's weekly list of February 5, 2010.

== See also ==
- National Register of Historic Places listings in Latah County, Idaho
