= John H. Hays =

American Civil War Medal of Honor recipient

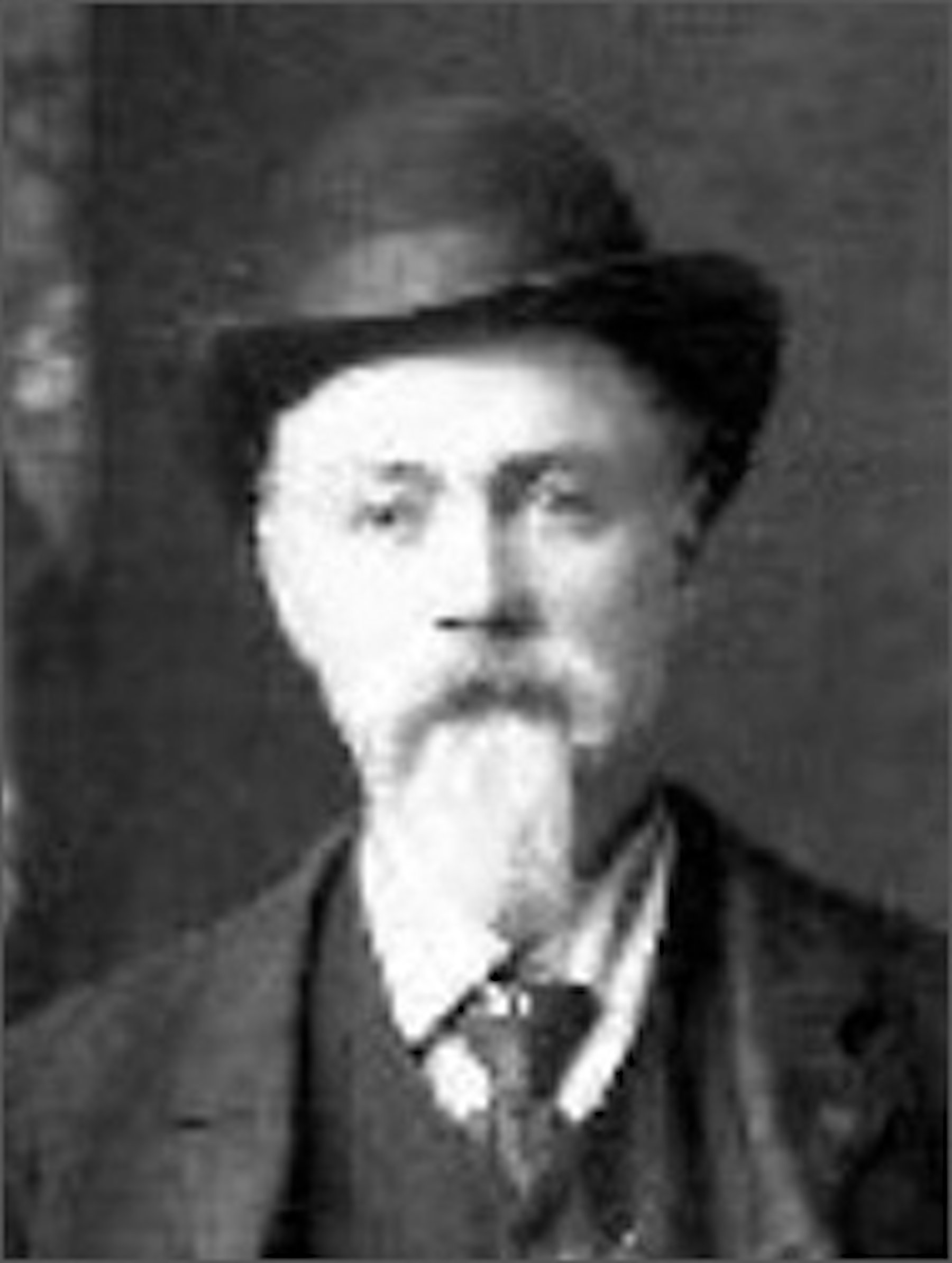
- Hays in 1895
- Born: August 4, 1844; Jefferson County, Ohio
- Died: January 27, 1904 (aged 59); Troy, Idaho
- Burial place: Moscow Cemetery, Moscow, Idaho
- Spouse: Nancy Cox (m. 1868)
- Military career
- Allegiance: United States of America
- Branch: United States Army
- Rank: Private
- Units: Company F, 4th Iowa Volunteer Cavalry Regiment
- Conflicts: Civil War: Battle of Columbus
- Awards: Medal of Honor

John Henry Hays (4 August 1844 – 27 January 1904) was a veteran of the American Civil War and recipient of the Medal of Honor.

== Biography ==
Hays was born in Ohio, but moved to the state of Iowa at the age of fifteen. He worked on his family's farm for the next three years. In 1862, Hays volunteered to join the Union Army. He was injured multiple times throughout the war, surviving a gunshot wound to his left thumb and being struck by debris from a falling bridge.

== Battle of Columbus ==
On April 16, 1865, seven days following the surrender of Confederate General Robert E. Lee at Appomattox Court House, Hays marched on Columbus, Georgia to secure the city's naval yards, weapons factories and supply depots. During the ensuing battle, Hays stormed a bridge over the Chattahoochee River and helped to capture a fort guarding it. During the battle for the fort, Hays captured the flag and the flag bearer of an Austin Battery stationed there. He received the Medal of Honor for this act.

== Citation ==
Capture of flag and bearer Austin's Battery (C.S.A.).

== Later life ==
Hays returned to his family farm following the conclusion of the Civil War. However, he left to open a blacksmith shop in Greenfield, Iowa in 1868. He later moved to Troy, Idaho in 1888 and opened a new blacksmith shop. The shop was ultimately destroyed in a fire. Hays began prospecting following the destruction of his shop and experienced some success at mining for silver. In 1894, Hays was appointed City Marshall of Troy.

== Death ==
On January 27, 1904, Hays attempted to arrest Paine Sly, an infamous locally known criminal, for domestic disturbance. Sly killed Hays in the ensuing shoot-out. Although fatally wounded, Hays returned fire and was able to injure Sly. Sly was later convicted of second-degree murder and sentenced to life in prison.

== See also ==
- 4th Iowa Volunteer Cavalry Regiment
- Battle of Columbus
