= Bovill (surname) =

Bovill is a surname. Notable people with the surname include:

- C. H. Bovill (1878–1918), writer
- Elliot Bovill, Chief Justice of the Straits Settlements
- Frederick Bovill, Victorian era opera singer
- James Bovill, (born 1971), cricketer
- William Bovill (1814–1873), judge
