= Moscow, Idaho =

City in northern Idaho, United States

- City
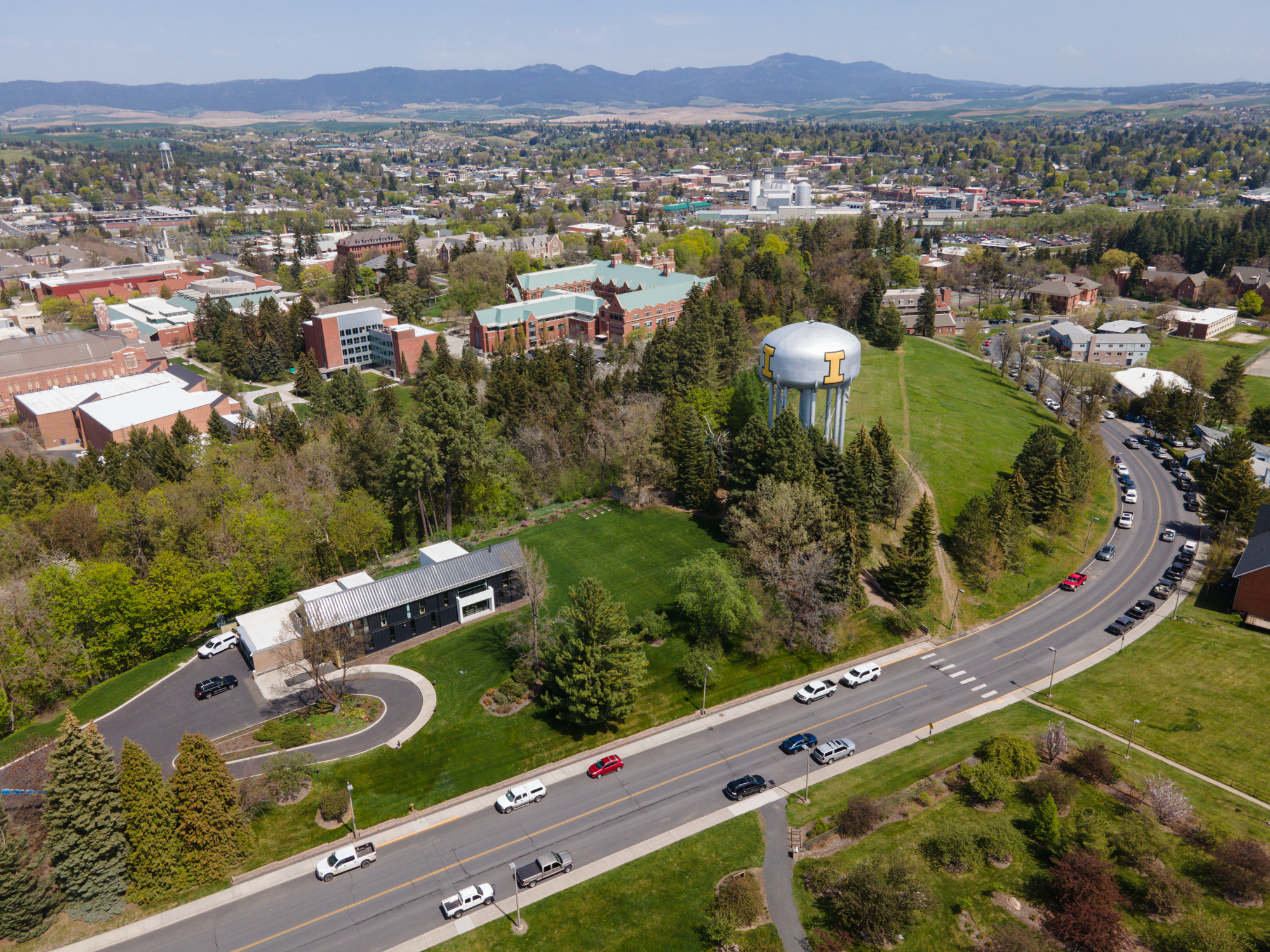
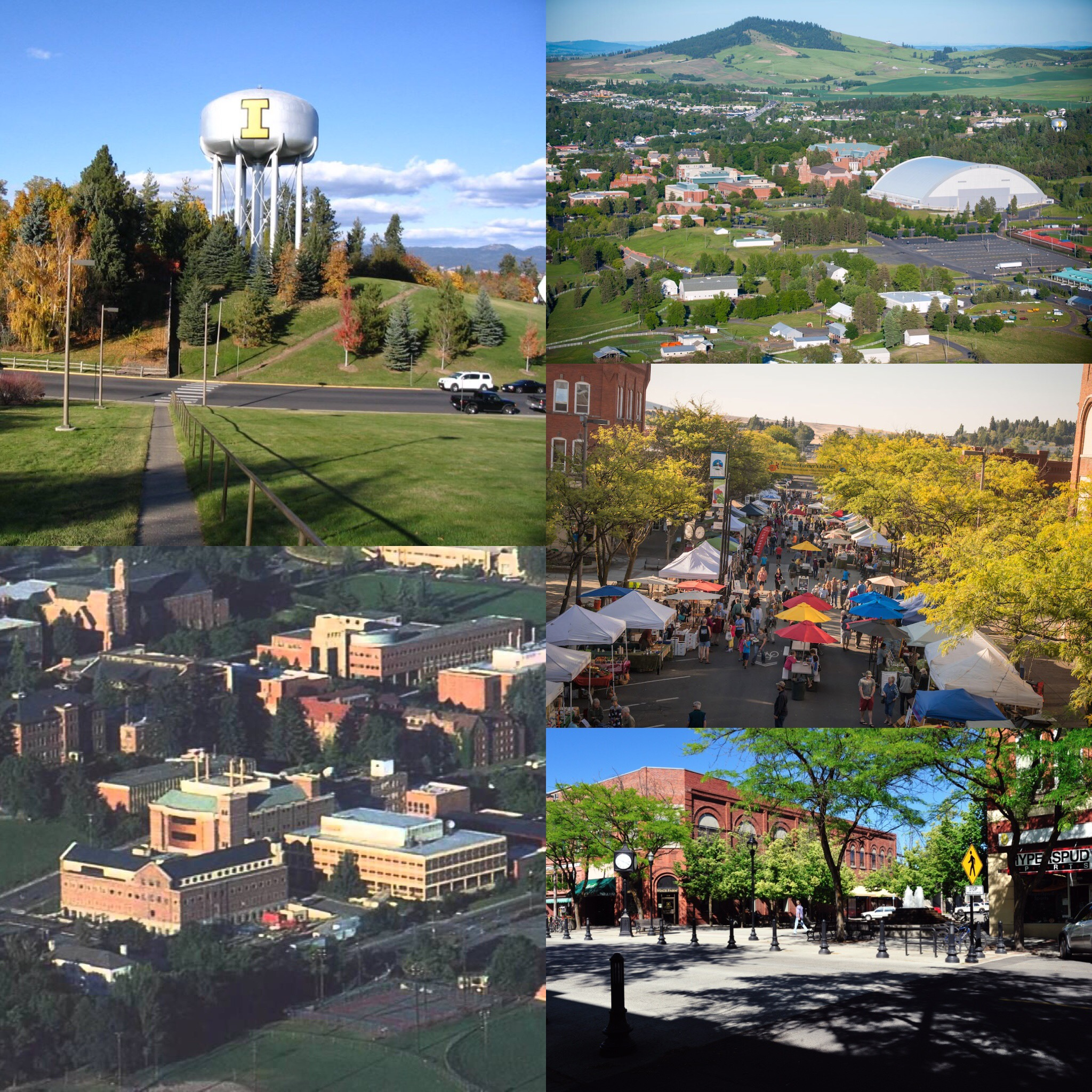
- Clockwise from top: Aerial view of Moscow, Kibbie Dome, Moscow Farmer's Market, Downtown Moscow, University of Idaho campus, water tower on campus

- Flag
- Motto: Heart of the Arts
- Location of Moscow in Latah County, Idaho

- Location in the United States
- Coordinates: 46°44′30″N 117°00′00″W
- Country: United States
- State: Idaho
- County: Latah
- Settled: 1871
- Incorporated (town): 1887
- Incorporated (city): 1893

Government
  - Type: Mayor–council
  - Mayor: Hailey Lewis

Area
  - Total: 6.91 sq mi (17.90 km^{2})
  - Land: 6.91 sq mi (17.89 km^{2})
  - Water: 0.0039 sq mi (0.01 km^{2})
- Elevation: 2,582 ft (787 m)

Population (2020)
  - Total: 25,435
  - Density: 3,719.9/sq mi (1,436.28/km^{2})
- Time zone: UTC−8 (Pacific)
  - Summer (DST): UTC−7 (Pacific Daylight)
- ZIP code: 83843
- Area code: 208
- FIPS code: 16-54550
- GNIS feature ID: 2411172
- Website: www.ci.moscow.id.us

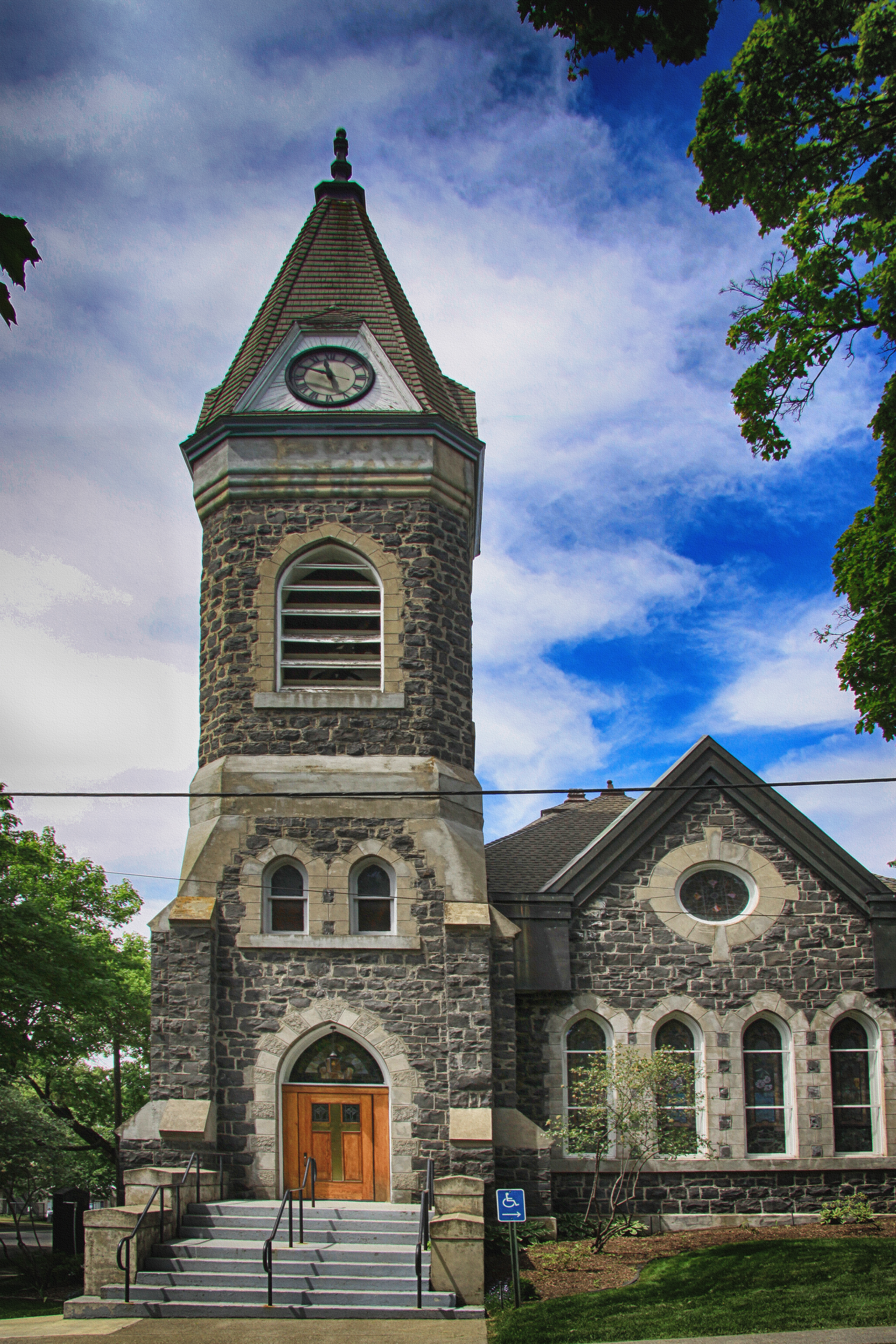
First United Methodist Church (1904), S. Adams at E. 3rd St.

Moscow (/ˈmɒskoʊ/ MOSS-koh) is a city in and the county seat of Latah County, Idaho, United States. Located in the North Central region of the state along the border with Washington, it had a population of 25,435 at the 2020 United States census. Moscow is the home of the University of Idaho, the state's land-grant institution and primary research university.

It is the principal city in the Moscow, Idaho Micropolitan Statistical Area, which includes all of Latah County. The city contains over 60% of the county's population, and the university is Moscow's dominant employer, the city also serves as an agricultural and commercial hub for the Palouse region.

Along with the rest of the Idaho Panhandle, Moscow is in the Pacific Time Zone. The elevation of its city center is 2,579 feet (786 m) above sea level. Two major highways serve the city, passing through the city center: US-95 (north-south) and ID-8 (east-west). The Pullman–Moscow Regional Airport, four miles (6 km) west, provides limited commercial air service. The local newspaper is the Moscow-Pullman Daily News.

== History ==
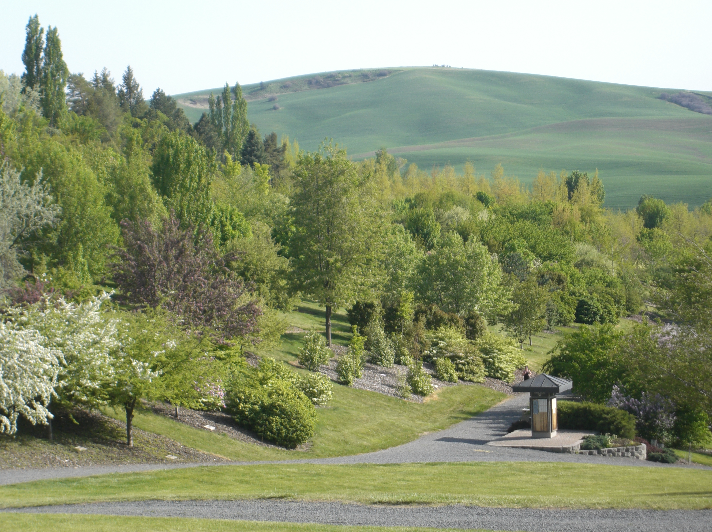
UI Arboretum's north entrance

Miners and farmers began arriving in the northern Idaho area after the Civil War. The first permanent settlers came to the Moscow area in 1871. The abundance of camas bulbs, a favorite fodder of pigs brought by the farmers, led to naming the vicinity "Hog Heaven". When the first US post office opened in 1872, the town was called "Paradise Valley", but the name changed to "Moscow" in 1875. The name Paradise persists in the main waterway through town, Paradise Creek, which originates at the west end of the Palouse Range, flows south to the Troy Highway, and west to Pullman where it enters the South Fork of the Palouse River.

Historians have disputed the precise origin of the name Moscow. There is no conclusive proof that it is connected to the Russian capital, though various accounts suggest it purposely evoked the Russian city or was named by Russian immigrants. Another account claims that the name derives from a Native American tribe named "Masco". Early settlers reported that five local men met to choose a proper name for the town, but could not agree. The postmaster, Samuel Neff, then completed the official papers for the town and chose Moscow for the name. Neff was born in Moscow, Pennsylvania.

By 1875, the town had a business district that was a center of commerce for the region. By 1890, the Oregon Railroad and Navigation Company's rail line (later the Union Pacific) and the Northern Pacific railroad line helped boost the town's population to 2,000.

The capital of the Idaho Territory was relocated from Lewiston to Boise in December 1864. In the late 1880s, statehood for the Washington Territory was nearing. Because its commercial and transportation interests looked west, rather than south, the citizens of the Idaho Panhandle passionately lobbied for their region to join Washington, or to form an entirely separate state, rather than remain connected with the less accessible southern Idaho. To appease the residents of the north, the territorial legislature of Idaho in Boise placed the new land grant university in Moscow, which at the time was the largest city other than Boise in the state. The University of Idaho was chartered in January 1889, and first opened its doors to students in October 1892.

In March 1890, Moscow's neighboring city, Pullman, became the home of Washington's land grant institution. The college that became Washington State University opened its doors in January 1892. Washington entered the union as the 42nd state in November 1889 and Idaho entered next, eight months later, in July 1890.

=== Moscow City Hall and Old Post Office ===
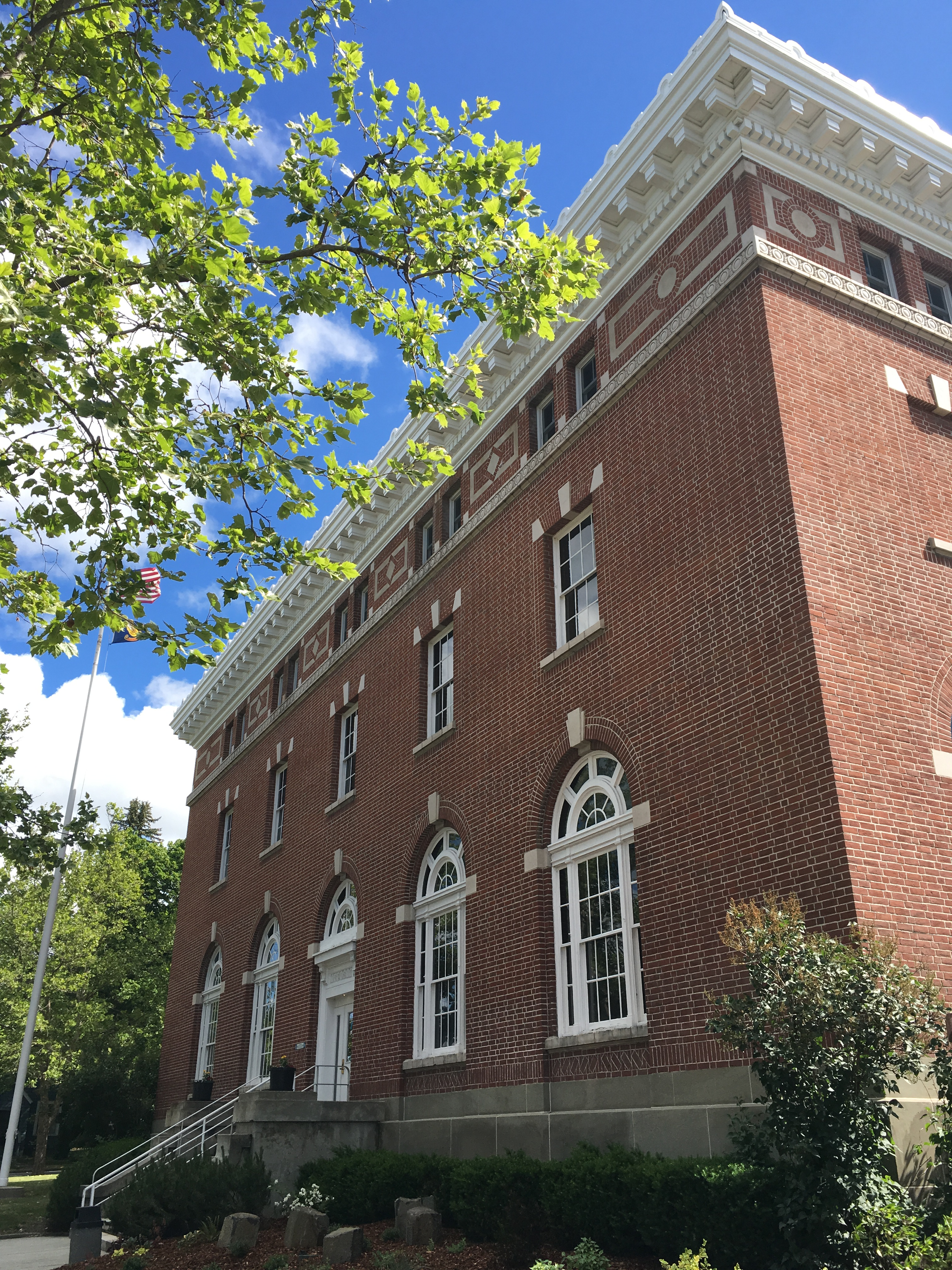
The Old Post Office, constructed in 1910, now the current City Hall (2016)

=== Moscow Public Library ===
Members of the Pleiades Club and Ladies' Historical Club formed a cooperative named the Women's Reading Room Society and established a small library in the Browne building at the corner of Main and Second Streets in 1902.

In 1904, the committee planned to raise funds for a new library building. Andrew Carnegie promised funding of $10,000 if the community agreed to maintain a free public library at the rate of at least $1000 annually. Moscow voters approved a permanent tax in 1905 and with successful fundraising by subscription of local residents and businesses, coupled with the Carnegie library money, the library construction was begun in 1905. In March 1906, the Mission Style building was ready for occupancy. Later that month, a fire at the university's Administration Building totally destroyed that structure, so the new library was used for university classes during the day and residents used the library in the evening. Beginning in 1907 the building was returned to full use as a library. The original library building (which is on the National Register of Historic Places) was expanded in 1931 and 1983. It houses a children's room named for Moscow native Carol Ryrie Brink, the author of 1936 Newbery Medal winner Caddie Woodlawn.

In 2006, the Friends of the Library celebrated a Century of Service for the organization. The current organizational structure of library service encompasses all public libraries in Latah County as the Latah County Library District. The library enjoys broad support from the citizens of Moscow and the county and is also supported by the Idaho Commission for Libraries (formerly the Idaho State Library.)

The Moscow Public Library currently houses about 60% of Latah County Library District's 100,000 volume collection. Administrative, technical, youth services, and branch services offices for the Library District are all housed at this location as well. The library offers year-round programming for all ages, including storytimes and a summer reading program for children, book clubs for teenagers and adults, and presentations by outside experts and organizations. The library also offers public Internet access computers as well as free wifi.

The library serves as resource for all the residents of Moscow, or as one essayist (Ellis Clark) in the 2006 contest states, "When time, money, or circumstances bind you to one locale, the Library is your passport for travel."

=== 1970 to 2009 ===
The opening of Moscow Mall (now Eastside Marketplace) and Palouse Empire Mall (now Palouse Mall) in the late 1970s shifted many retail businesses away from the aging city center, with buildings dating to the 1890s. The city developed a revitalization project for downtown in the early 1970s that included a major traffic revision, which was enacted in 1981. Traffic from US 95 on Main Street was diverted a block away to one-way corridors on Washington (northbound) and Jackson (southbound) streets, to alleviate congestion and improve pedestrian safety and the overall city center experience. Main Street was converted from four busy lanes with metered parallel parking to two lanes of local retail traffic with free diagonal parking; its sidewalks were modified and trees were added. At the north end of Moscow, southbound highway traffic divided west at 'D' Street to Jackson and returned to Main at 8th; the northbound route divided east at 8th, but returned to Main four blocks earlier in the north end, at 1st Street.

The original 90-degree couplets of 1981 used existing streets of the grid. Planners intended these as temporary, but they remained for years. The primary safety hazard was inexperienced truck drivers—excessive speed through the tight corners led to toppled loads and subsequent traffic snarls, with occasional damage to adjacent structures. The new, straighter couplets at the north end are both over a block in length and eliminated existing structures. The return couplet from Washington Street runs from 1st Street to beyond 'A' Street; it eliminated the original front portion (white stucco chapel) of the Corner Club tavern at the northeast corner of 'A' and Main, which was demolished in early 1991 after staving off its elimination for over a decade. The building on the southeast corner, the Idaho Hotel, built in 1890, was razed for the traffic project in 1977 and was a vacant lot for over a decade.

The first of the new couplets was completed during the summer of 1991. The new southbound couplet to Jackson Street was completed the following year in 1992 and begins north of 'C' Street. It eliminated a former service station at the northwest corner of 'C' and Main, which had been converted to other retail for over a decade. The critical couplet at the south end of the city was delayed several times for various reasons. Completed in 2000, it is two blocks south and one block east of the 1981 divider at 8th Street. After Sweet Avenue, northbound Main Street bends a block east to align with northbound one-way Washington Street, intersecting the two-way Troy Highway from the southeast. Southbound US 95 traffic joins the intersection from the northwest, arriving on a one-way diagonal from Jackson Street. Agricultural buildings on the block between Jackson and Main (College St. to Lewis St.) were razed in the late 1990s to complete this new corridor. The completion of the south couplet allowed Gritman Medical Center to expand southward, over Eighth Street.

Another significant change to local commerce was the increase of the state's legal drinking age to 21 in April 1987, after nearly fifteen years at age 19. Many establishments that relied on revenues from 19- and 20-year-olds from the two university communities had to adjust or cease operations. Prior to the lowering to 19 in July 1972, the drinking age in Idaho was 20 for beer and 21 for liquor and wine.

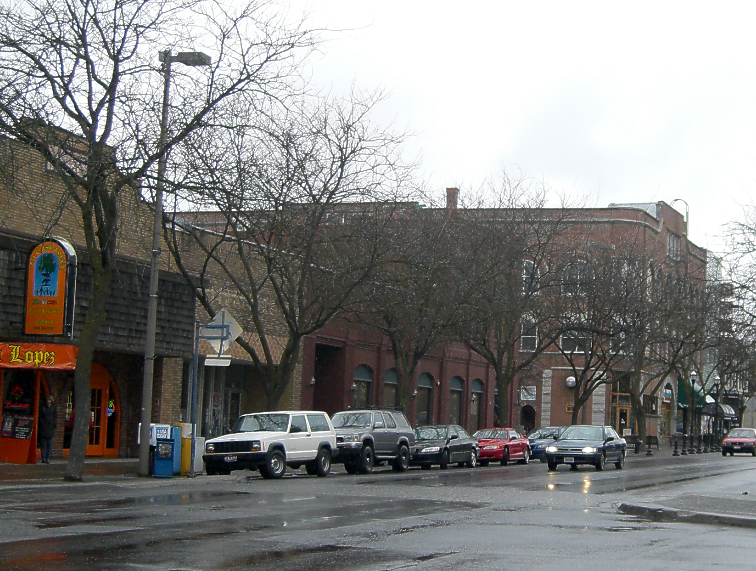
Downtown Moscow in 2007, at Main & 5th streets

A fixture of the Moscow skyline for nearly a century, the concrete grain elevators on south Main Street were demolished in March 2007. Located on the southwest corner of 8th & Main, the elevators were last operated by the Latah County Grain Growers. The other major concrete elevator complex, on Jackson Street south of 6th, was also slated for the wrecking ball. Idle since 2005, a preservationist group saved it in 2007. Its newer large-diameter metal silo hosted summer theater productions in 2011.

=== 2010 to present ===
Moscow is known internationally as the location of Christ Church and its associated ministries: Canon Press and New Saint Andrews College, as well as Logos School. Crawford Gribben suggests that Moscow is "America's most postmillennial town", since the town's two explicitly postmillennial congregations (Christ Church and Trinity Reformed Church), make up about 10% of the town's permanent population. People, businesses, and institutions associated with Christ Church have acquired a significant amount of property on and around Main Street.

In the early morning hours of November 13, 2022, four University of Idaho students were stabbed to death in an off-campus rented home in Moscow by an attacker using a Ka-Bar knife. On December 30, 28-year-old Bryan C. Kohberger, a PhD candidate at Washington State University, was arrested and charged with four counts of murder and one count of felony burglary, after his DNA was linked to the crime scene. He initially pleaded not guilty, before changing his plea to guilty in July 2025, to avoid the death penalty. Kohberger was subsequently sentenced to four consecutive life sentences without the possibility of parole and an additional 10 years for burglary.

== Geography ==
Main Street runs north–south through Moscow along the 117th meridian west.

According to the United States Census Bureau, the city has a total area of 6.85 square miles (17.7 km^{2}), all of it land.

Moscow lies on the eastern edge of the Palouse region of north central Idaho in the Columbia River Plateau. East of the city is a valley within the mountains of the Palouse Range to the northeast, whose highest point is Moscow Mountain at 4,983 feet (1,519 m) above sea level. The less prominent Paradise Ridge at 3,702 feet (1,128 m) and Tomer Butte at 3,474 feet (1,059 m) are southeast of the city. Paradise Creek, with headwaters on Moscow Mountain to the northeast, flows through Moscow, then crosses the state border and joins the south fork of the Palouse River near Pullman, which eventually drains into the Snake River and Columbia River on its way to the Pacific Ocean.

The geology in and around Moscow represents varied formations: very old intrusive granite structures of the Jurassic−Eocene Idaho Batholith, fertile fields atop rolling hills of deep Pleistocene loess of the Palouse Formation deposited after the last ice age by westerly winds, and flood-worn channels of the Columbia River Basalt Group.

There is a variety of flora and fauna within the vicinity of Moscow. An amphibian, the Rough-skinned Newt, has a disjunctive population at Moscow; this species is found typically along the Pacific coast of the US. The city sits at the boundary between the Palouse grasslands and wheat fields, and the conifer forests of the Rocky Mountains to the east.

=== Climate ===
According to the Köppen climate classification system, Moscow has either a warm-summer Mediterranean climate (Csb) or a dry-summer continental climate (Dsb).

Climate data for Moscow, Idaho (University of Idaho), 1991–2020 normals, extremes 1893–present
Month	Jan	Feb	Mar	Apr	May	Jun	Jul	Aug	Sep	Oct	Nov	Dec	Year
Record high °F (°C)	58 (14)	66 (19)	73 (23)	88 (31)	94 (34)	105 (41)	105 (41)	109 (43)	100 (38)	88 (31)	73 (23)	61 (16)	109 (43)
Mean maximum °F (°C)	49.5 (9.7)	53.5 (11.9)	64.6 (18.1)	74.8 (23.8)	83.2 (28.4)	88.6 (31.4)	96.6 (35.9)	98.2 (36.8)	91.9 (33.3)	78.3 (25.7)	60.2 (15.7)	49.4 (9.7)	99.1 (37.3)
Mean daily maximum °F (°C)	37.4 (3.0)	42.0 (5.6)	50.1 (10.1)	58.0 (14.4)	67.3 (19.6)	73.4 (23.0)	84.4 (29.1)	85.6 (29.8)	76.2 (24.6)	60.5 (15.8)	44.9 (7.2)	36.4 (2.4)	59.7 (15.4)
Daily mean °F (°C)	29.8 (−1.2)	32.9 (0.5)	39.0 (3.9)	45.0 (7.2)	52.6 (11.4)	57.7 (14.3)	64.9 (18.3)	65.4 (18.6)	57.9 (14.4)	46.6 (8.1)	36.2 (2.3)	29.0 (−1.7)	46.4 (8.0)
Mean daily minimum °F (°C)	22.2 (−5.4)	23.8 (−4.6)	28.0 (−2.2)	32.0 (0.0)	37.9 (3.3)	42.0 (5.6)	45.3 (7.4)	45.2 (7.3)	39.7 (4.3)	32.8 (0.4)	27.4 (−2.6)	21.6 (−5.8)	33.2 (0.6)
Mean minimum °F (°C)	4.2 (−15.4)	9.8 (−12.3)	16.8 (−8.4)	24.9 (−3.9)	28.2 (−2.1)	33.7 (0.9)	37.3 (2.9)	36.2 (2.3)	29.0 (−1.7)	20.1 (−6.6)	13.2 (−10.4)	5.7 (−14.6)	−4.8 (−20.4)
Record low °F (°C)	−26 (−32)	−26 (−32)	−10 (−23)	11 (−12)	19 (−7)	28 (−2)	31 (−1)	30 (−1)	20 (−7)	2 (−17)	−14 (−26)	−42 (−41)	−42 (−41)
Average precipitation inches (mm)	3.33 (85)	2.56 (65)	3.05 (77)	2.75 (70)	2.60 (66)	1.73 (44)	0.66 (17)	0.70 (18)	1.01 (26)	2.40 (61)	3.52 (89)	3.47 (88)	27.78 (706)
Average snowfall inches (cm)	14.5 (37)	8.6 (22)	4.9 (12)	1.0 (2.5)	0.2 (0.51)	0.0 (0.0)	0.0 (0.0)	0.0 (0.0)	0.0 (0.0)	0.2 (0.51)	6.0 (15)	15.5 (39)	50.9 (128.52)
Average extreme snow depth inches (cm)	9.0 (23)	5.3 (13)	2.5 (6.4)	0.1 (0.25)	0.0 (0.0)	0.0 (0.0)	0.0 (0.0)	0.0 (0.0)	0.0 (0.0)	0.0 (0.0)	2.5 (6.4)	7.0 (18)	11.7 (30)
Average precipitation days (≥ 0.01 in)	16.0	13.9	15.5	13.4	11.4	9.3	4.4	3.6	5.5	10.9	16.1	15.9	135.9
Average snowy days (≥ 0.1 in)	6.3	5.0	3.2	1.1	0.3	0.0	0.0	0.0	0.0	0.3	3.2	7.8	27.2
Source 1: NOAA
Source 2: National Weather Service

== Demographics ==
Historical population
Census	Pop.	Note	%±
1880	76		—
1890	1,280		1,584.2%
1900	2,484		94.1%
1910	3,670		47.7%
1920	3,956		7.8%
1930	4,476		13.1%
1940	6,014		34.4%
1950	10,593		76.1%
1960	11,183		5.6%
1970	14,146		26.5%
1980	16,513		16.7%
1990	18,519		12.1%
2000	21,291		15.0%
2010	23,800		11.8%
2020	25,435		6.9%
U.S. Decennial Census 2020

=== Racial and ethnic composition ===
Moscow city, Idaho – Racial composition Note: the US Census treats Hispanic/Latino as an ethnic category. This table excludes Latinos from the racial categories and assigns them to a separate category. Hispanics/Latinos may be of any race.
Race (NH = Non-Hispanic)	% 2020	% 2010	% 2000	Pop 2020	Pop 2010	Pop 2000
White alone (NH)	81.6%	88.2%	91%	20,759	20,982	19,376
Black alone (NH)	1.2%	1.1%	0.9%	296	266	191
American Indian alone (NH)	0.7%	0.6%	0.7%	169	135	152
Asian alone (NH)	3.5%	3%	3.1%	890	721	664
Pacific Islander alone (NH)	0.1%	0.2%	0.1%	36	36	30
Other race alone (NH)	0.6%	0.1%	0.1%	141	27	26
Multiracial (NH)	5.9%	2.3%	1.5%	1,508	542	327
Hispanic/Latino (any race)	6.4%	4.6%	2.5%	1,636	1,091	525

=== 2020 census ===
As of the 2020 census, Moscow had a population of 25,435. The median age was 26.6 years. 17.6% of residents were under the age of 18 and 10.9% of residents were 65 years of age or older. For every 100 females there were 100.2 males, and for every 100 females age 18 and over there were 99.7 males age 18 and over.

99.9% of residents lived in urban areas, while 0.1% lived in rural areas.

There were 10,401 households in Moscow, of which 22.8% had children under the age of 18 living in them. Of all households, 35.9% were married-couple households, 26.6% were households with a male householder and no spouse or partner present, and 29.0% were households with a female householder and no spouse or partner present. About 35.7% of all households were made up of individuals and 8.4% had someone living alone who was 65 years of age or older.

There were 11,020 housing units, of which 5.6% were vacant. The homeowner vacancy rate was 1.3% and the rental vacancy rate was 4.9%.

Racial composition as of the 2020 census
Race	Number	Percent
White	21,430	84.3%
Black or African American	305	1.2%
American Indian and Alaska Native	206	0.8%
Asian	902	3.5%
Native Hawaiian and Other Pacific Islander	46	0.2%
Some other race	507	2.0%
Two or more races	2,039	8.0%
Hispanic or Latino (of any race)	1,636	6.4%

The most reported ancestries in 2020 were:

- German (24.3%)
- English (22.6%)
- Irish (16.7%)
- Scottish (5.9%)
- Norwegian (4%)
- Italian (3.8%)
- French (3.8%)
- Mexican (3.6%)
- Swedish (3.5%)
- Polish (2.3%)

=== 2010 census ===
As of the census of 2010, there were 23,800 people, 9,180 households, and 4,335 families residing in the city. The population density was 3,474.5 inhabitants per square mile (1,341.5 inhabitants/km^{2}). There were 9,879 housing units at an average density of 1,442.2 units per square mile (556.8 units/km^{2}). The racial makeup of the city was 90.9% White, 1.1% African American, 0.6% Native American, 3.1% Asian, 0.2% Pacific Islander, 1.4% from other races, and 2.7% from two or more races. Hispanic or Latino of any race were 4.6% of the population.

There were 9,180 households, of which 22.9% had children under the age of 18 living with them, 37.8% were married couples living together, 6.1% had a female householder with no husband present, 3.4% had a male householder with no wife present, and 52.8% were non-families. 31.3% of all households were made up of individuals, and 6.6% had someone living alone who was 65 years of age or older. The average household size was 2.26 and the average family size was 2.91.

The median age in the city was 24.2 years. 16.4% of residents were under the age of 18; 36.1% were between the ages of 18 and 24; 24.7% were from 25 to 44; 15.6% were from 45 to 64; and 7.4% were 65 years of age or older. The gender makeup of the city was 51.8% male and 48.2% female.

=== 2000 census ===
As of the census of 2000, there were 21,291 people, 7,724 households, and 3,869 families residing in the city. The population density was 3,460.6 people per square mile (1,336.1 people/km^{2}). There were 8,029 housing units at an average density of 1,305.0 units per square mile (503.9 units/km^{2}). The racial makeup of the city was:

- 92.23% White
- 0.91% African American
- 0.80% Native American
- 3.13% Asian
- 0.14% Pacific Islander
- 0.97% from other races
- 1.82% from two or more races

Hispanic or Latino of any race were 2.47% of the population.

There were 7,724 households, out of which 24.2% had children under the age of 18 living with them, 41.0% were married couples living together, 6.4% had a female householder with no husband present, and 49.9% were non-families. 29.9% of all households were made up of individuals, and 5.5% had someone living alone who was 65 years of age or older. The average household size was 2.25 and the average family size was 2.87.

In the city, the age distribution of the population shows:

- 16.1% under the age of 18
- 35.8% from 18 to 24
- 26.3% from 25 to 44
- 14.0% from 45 to 64
- 7.8% 65 years of age or older

The median age was 24 years. For every 100 females, there were 109.3 males. For every 100 females age 18 and over, there were 110.1 males.

The median income for a household in the city was $26,884, and the median income for a family was $46,331. Males had a median income of $35,494 versus $24,560 for females. The per capita income for the city was $14,930. About 9.5% of families and 22.4% of the population were below the poverty line, including 8.2% of those under age 18 and 4.5% of those age 65 or over.

== Arts and culture ==
The city was highlighted in a comedy special at University of Idaho by actor-comedian Yakov Smirnoff, filmed in late 1990. Using Moscow as its setting pokes fun at Smirnoff emigrating from Moscow, Russia.

Name	Dates	Location	Notes
Lionel Hampton Jazz Festival	April, second to last weekend	Multiple venues	Main concerts: Idaho Central Credit Union Arena
Moscow Hemp Fest	April, mid-month	East City Park	
Renaissance Fair	May, first weekend	East City Park	Multiple stages and events
Farmers Market	May–October, Saturdays	Main Street	8am - 1pm
Rendezvous in the Park	July, third week	East City Park	
Light up the Night Parade	December 1	Main Street	

== Parks and recreation ==
Maypole dancers in East City Park

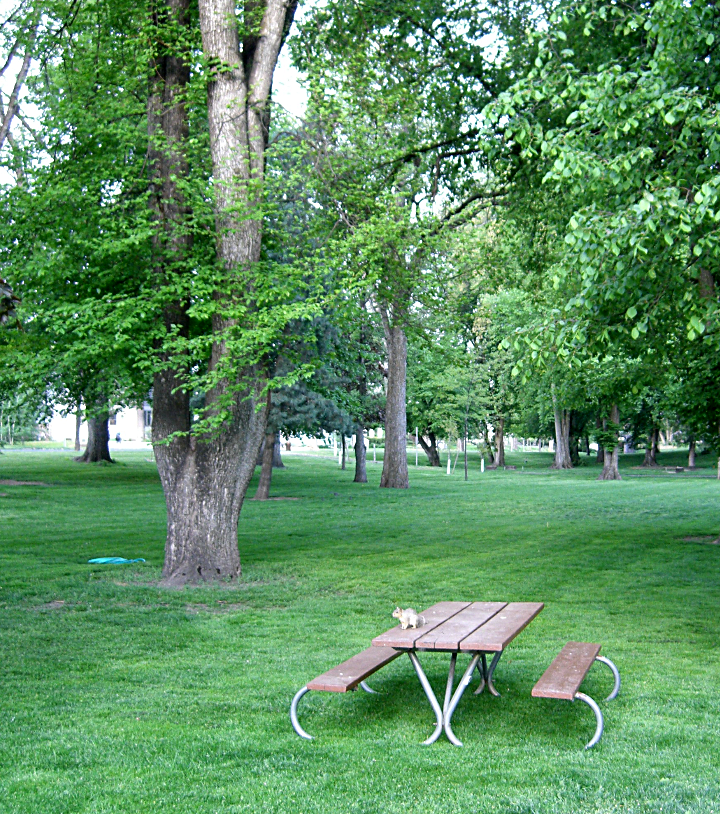
East City Park

There are seventeen neighborhood parks located throughout the town offering a wide variety of venues for outdoor activities. These parks fall under the jurisdiction of the Moscow Parks and Recreation Department. The Moscow Pathways Commission (formerly Paradise Path Task Force) is a citizen committee seeking to develop a system of linearly connected parks throughout the area. Carol Ryrie Brink Nature Park was a community collaboration between the Palouse Clearwater Environmental Institute and local volunteers to remeander Paradise Creek and add riparian plantings. The Moscow community, including schools and the city, led by local youth, raised money over several years to fund, design, and build a skate park that was completed in 2000. A park just north of the university is named for Admiral Robert Ghormley, from 1933 to 1997, it was the site of the city's outdoor swimming pool. Its replacement, the Hamilton-Lowe Aquatics Center in northeast Moscow, opened in June 2000.

The Latah Trail, completed in October 2008, extends from the eastern edge of Moscow bike path system to Troy, parallel to the Troy Highway (SH-8) for most of its twelve miles (19 km). On the west side of Moscow, the Bill Chipman Palouse Trail connects the two university communities of the Palouse. Starting at the University of Idaho's Perimeter Road, it gradually descends with Paradise Creek for eight miles (13 km) to Pullman through Whitman County, alongside the Moscow-Pullman Highway. Completed in April 1998, the trail honors a Pullman businessman (and UI alumnus) who died two years earlier, following a winter highway accident in Spokane County. The Paradise Path bridges the gap in Moscow between the endpoints of the Chipman and Latah trails, passing through the north and east edges of the UI campus. The trail systems together constitute a continuous 22-mile (35 km) paved linear park from Pullman to Troy, extending in Troy beyond the eastern boundary of the Palouse ecosystem. From Pullman to the western boundary of Moscow (the state line), it follows the right of way of a dismantled Union Pacific railroad line, and east of US-95 it follows the right of way of a dismantled BNSF railroad line that junctioned at Arrow on the Clearwater River by way of Troy, Kendrick, and Juliaetta.

The defunct Tamarack Ski Area was on the east-facing slope of East Moscow Mountain; a grove of ancient red cedar trees is nearby, just northeast of Moscow Mountain's summit.

== Government ==
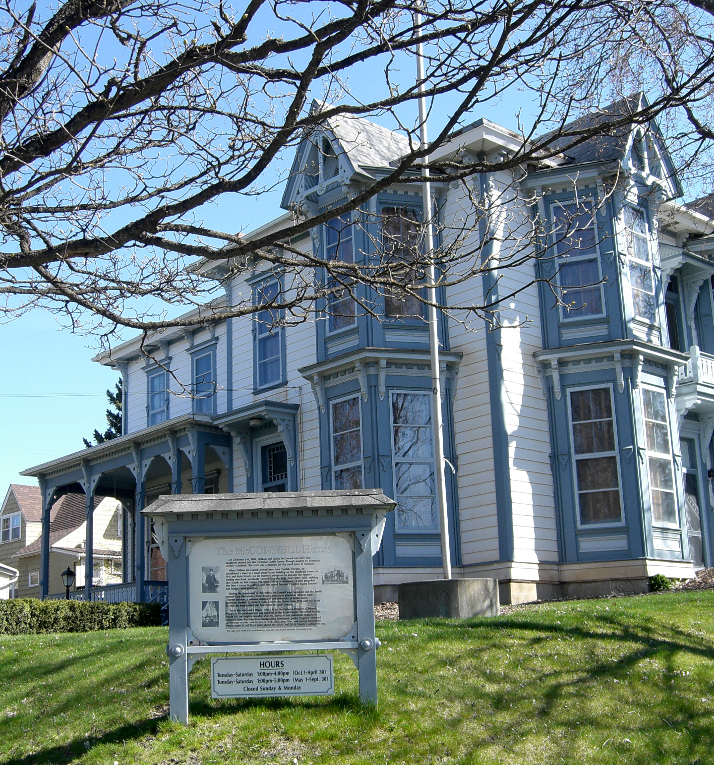
McConnell Mansion (1886), listed on the National Register of Historic Places

Moscow has a Mayor-Council form of government consisting of six Council members (at large) and a Mayor. These positions are elected separately and serve four year terms. Council member elections are held in odd-numbered years in November, with terms staggered so that three of the six seats are open at each election. Mayoral elections are held the November after a US presidential election.

The Council elects a President and vice-president from among its members at its first meeting in January each year. These two officers may stand in for the mayor as necessary. Council is the legislative and judicial arm of Moscow's City government; enacting ordinances and resolutions. This body confirms the Mayor's appointments of City officials and citizen advisory commission members. Council approves the city's annual budget and serves as the convening body for public hearings and appeals of other City Boards and Commissions. Meetings are generally scheduled for the first and third Monday of each month, beginning at 7:00 p.m.

== Education ==
=== Higher education ===
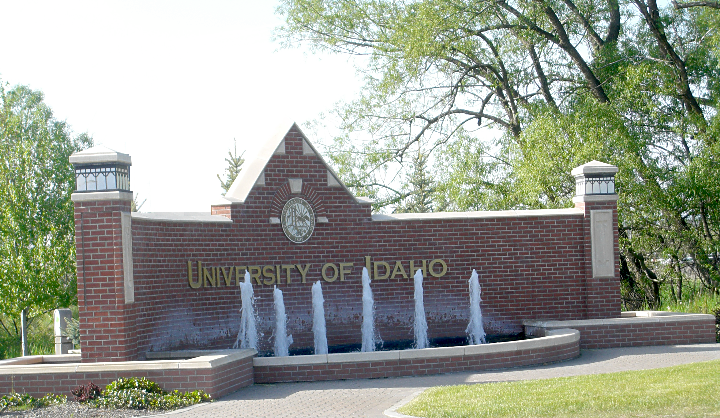
East entrance the University of Idaho in Moscow

The University of Idaho (officially abbreviated "U of I") is Idaho's oldest public university, located in the city of Moscow in Latah County in the northern portion of the state. It is the state's flagship, land-grant, and primary research university. The University of Idaho was the state's sole university for 71 years, until 1963, and its College of Law, established in 1909, was first accredited by the American Bar Association in 1925.

Formed by the territorial legislature on January 30, 1889, the university opened its doors in 1892 on October 3, with an initial class of 40 students. The first graduating class in 1896 contained two men and two women. It presently has an enrollment exceeding 12,000, with over 11,000 on the Moscow campus. The university offers 142 degree programs, including bachelor's, master's, doctoral, and specialists' degrees. Certificates of completion are offered in 30 areas of study. At 25% and 53%, its 4 and 6 year graduation rates are the highest of any public university in Idaho, and it generates 74% of all research money in the state, with research expenditures of $100 million in 2010 alone.

As a land-grant university and the primary research university in the state, UI has the largest campus in the state at 1,585 acres (6.4 km^{2}), located in the hills of the Palouse region. The school is home to the Idaho Vandals, who competed on the Division I FBS (formerly I-A) level through the 2017 season before dropping down to the FCS level in 2018. In addition to the main campus in Moscow, the UI has branch campuses in Coeur d'Alene, Boise, Twin Falls, and Idaho Falls. It also operates a research park in Post Falls and dozens of extension offices statewide.

New Saint Andrews College opened in 1994 and moved to its present campus on Main Street in 2003.

=== Primary and secondary education ===
The Moscow School District #281, which covers the entire city limits, operates Moscow High School (9-12), an alternative high school, a middle school (6-8), and four elementary schools (two K-5, one K-2, one 3–5).

There are two public charter schools and three private schools in the city.

=== High school ===
- Moscow High School (9–12)

=== Alternative high school ===
- Paradise Creek Regional High School (10–12)

=== Middle school ===
- Moscow Middle School (6–8)
- Palouse Prairie Charter School (K–8)

=== Elementary schools ===
- Lena Whitmore Elementary School (K–5)
- A.B. McDonald Elementary School (K–5)
- John Russell Elementary School(Closed 2024) (3–5)
- West Park Elementary School (K–5)
- Palouse Prairie Charter School (K–8)
- Moscow Charter School (K-6)

== Infrastructure ==
=== Transportation ===
==== Highways ====
US-95 connects Moscow to Coeur d'Alene, Lewiston, and the Treasure Valley with onward connections to Boise. ID-8 runs east–west through Moscow and travels to Pullman in the west and Troy to the east.

==== Airports ====
Pullman–Moscow Regional Airport is 4 miles (6 km) west, just east of the Washington State University campus. Other nearby airports are the Lewiston-Nez Perce County Airport, 34 miles (55 km) south, and Spokane International, 90 miles (140 km) north.

==== Rail and bus service ====
The Moscow Intermodal Transit Center is the transport hub for SMART (Sustainable Moscow Area Transit Service) transit and intercity bus services. Bus service to Spokane and Boise is offered by Northwestern Trailways. Wheatland Express also provides service to Spokane.

==== Bicycles ====
The Paradise Path is an east-to-west multi-use path that connects to shopping centers, the University of Idaho, and city parks. A small network of bike lanes and sharrows connects the Paradise Path to downtown and residential areas to the east. There are intercity bike trail connections with the Bill Chipman Palouse Trail to Pullman, Washington and the Latah Trail to the eastern town of Troy.

== Notable people ==
- H. Lee Barnes (born 1944), American writer of fiction and nonfiction, military veteran with awards; Contemporary Authors, New Revision Series. Gale, via Encyclopedia.com.
- Shanin Blake (born 1994), pop singer, artist, influencer and model
- Carol Ryrie Brink (1895–1981), author
- Bryce Callahan (born 1991), former NFL cornerback with the Chicago Bears and the Denver Broncos
- Joel Courtney (born 1996), actor
- Darren Doane (born 1972), filmmaker and music video director
- Hec Edmundson (1886–1964), basketball and track coach, state's first Olympian (1912)
- Burton L. French (1875–1954), congressman from Idaho for 26 years
- Jackson Gillis (1916–2010), screenwriter
- Abe M. Goff (1899–1984), congressman (1947–1949), served in military in both world wars
- Shay Hatten (born 1993), screenwriter and film producer
- Samuel D. Hunter (born 1981), playwright, 2014 MacArthur Fellowship recipient
- Robert Jessup (born 1952), artist
- Kelli Johnson, news anchor for NBC Sports Bay Area
- Lawrence H. Johnston (1918–2011), Manhattan Project physicist
- Luke Kruytbosch (1961–2008), thoroughbred horse racing announcer
- Andrea Lloyd-Curry (born 1965), retired women's basketball player, Olympic gold medalist
- Tom McCall (1913–1983), Governor of Oregon (1967–1975), Moscow newspaper reporter (1937–1942)
- William J. McConnell (1839–1925), Governor of Idaho (1893–97), father-in-law of Senator William Borah
- Dan Monson (born 1961), college basketball coach
- James C. Nelson, attorney and former Justice of the Montana Supreme Court
- Dan O'Brien (born 1966) Olympic and world champion decathlete; Moscow resident (1984–1997)
- Malcolm Renfrew (1910–2013), chemist and author of the first scientific papers on Teflon
- Doug Riesenberg (born 1965), retired NFL lineman, Super Bowl champion
- Josh Ritter (born 1976), singer-songwriter and author
- Frank B. Robinson (1886–1948), founder of spiritual movement, Psychiana
- Dayton Leroy Rogers (born 1953), serial killer known as the "Mollala Forest Killer"
- Lyle Smith (1916–2017), football coach and athletic director at Boise State
- Willis Sweet (1856–1925), Idaho's first congressman after statehood (1890–95)
- Paul Wheaton, permaculture theorist, software engineer
- Douglas James Wilson (born 1953), theologian, Christian nationalist
- N. D. Wilson (born 1978), author
- Jonathan M. Woodward (born 1973), stage and screen actor

== Sister city ==
Moscow has one sister city, as designated by Sister Cities International:

- Villa Carlos Fonseca, Nicaragua
