= Sinead Bovell =

Canadian futurist and entrepreneur

- Born: Canada
- Education: Bachelor of Business Administration (B.B.A.) in Finance and Chemistry; M.B.A. in Strategic Management; A.I. Ethics
- Alma mater: Wilfrid Laurier University; University of Toronto; M.I.T.
- Occupations: futurist, entrepreneur, and advocate for technology

Sinead Bovell is a Canadian futurist, entrepreneur, and advocate for technology education and ethics. Bovell is widely recognized for her efforts to bridge the gap between emerging technologies and underrepresented communities, earning her the nickname "The AI Educator for Non-Nerds" by Vogue. She spoke about A.I. on CNN, and was featured in Vogue, Wired, Toronto Star, and other media. She is the founder of WAYE (Weekly Advice for Young Entrepreneurs), a platform dedicated to preparing young people for the future of work in a digital age.

== Education ==
Bovell obtained a Bachelor of Business Administration (B.B.A.) in Finance and Chemistry at Wilfrid Laurier University, followed by an M.B.A. in Strategic Management from the Rotman School of Management at the University of Toronto. She later earned a certification in A.I. Ethics from M.I.T. Professional Education.

== Career and founding WAYE ==
Bovell worked as a management consultant summer intern at A.T. Kearney. She transitioned into modeling and entrepreneurship to explore her passion for technology and its societal impact.

In 2017, Sinead Bovell founded WAYE, an organization aimed at educating millennials and zoomers on emerging technologies such as blockchain, artificial intelligence and cybersecurity. The platform emphasizes inclusivity and accessibility, particularly for minority and non-traditional markets[3]. WAYE has hosted numerous events, including talks that bring together diverse audiences ranging from artists to business executives to discuss the future of technology.

Through WAYE, Bovell has educated over 300,000 young entrepreneurs globally on topics related to technology and innovation.

== Public speaking and advocacy ==
Sinead Bovell is an 11-time United Nations speaker and has addressed world leaders, including presidents and royalty, on topics ranging from digital inclusion to cybersecurity. She serves as a strategic advisor to the United Nations International Telecommunication Union (I.T.U.), focusing on digital inclusion initiatives. Additionally, she has delivered keynote speeches at major conferences and events worldwide. Her TEDx talk on the ethics of avatars highlighted the ethical dilemmas posed by digital technologies.

Bovell advocates for equitable access to technology education. She believes that young people should not only understand emerging technologies but also have the opportunity to shape their development. Her work emphasizes ethical considerations in A.I. deployment to ensure that technological advancements benefit all segments of society.

Bovell is a regular tech commentator for major networks such as CNN, NBC, and CNBC. Her insights have also been featured in Wired, Refinery29, and other prominent news outlets. She leverages online social networks to reach over 20,000 daily viewers with her forecasts on technology’s future impact.

== Awards and recognition ==
- Named one of Refinery29's "Top Ten Black Women Changing the Game".
- Honored as a "Digital Trailblazer" by Alliance for Peacebuilding for her work in promoting safe and inclusive cyberspace.
- Featured by Vogue as an influential voice making A.I. accessible to broader audiences.

== Personal life ==
Sinead Bovell was born and raised in Canada. Based in New York City, Sinead Bovell continues to expand WAYE’s reach while collaborating with governments, corporations, and educational institutions to advance digital literacy worldwide.
