= Bovill, Idaho =

- City
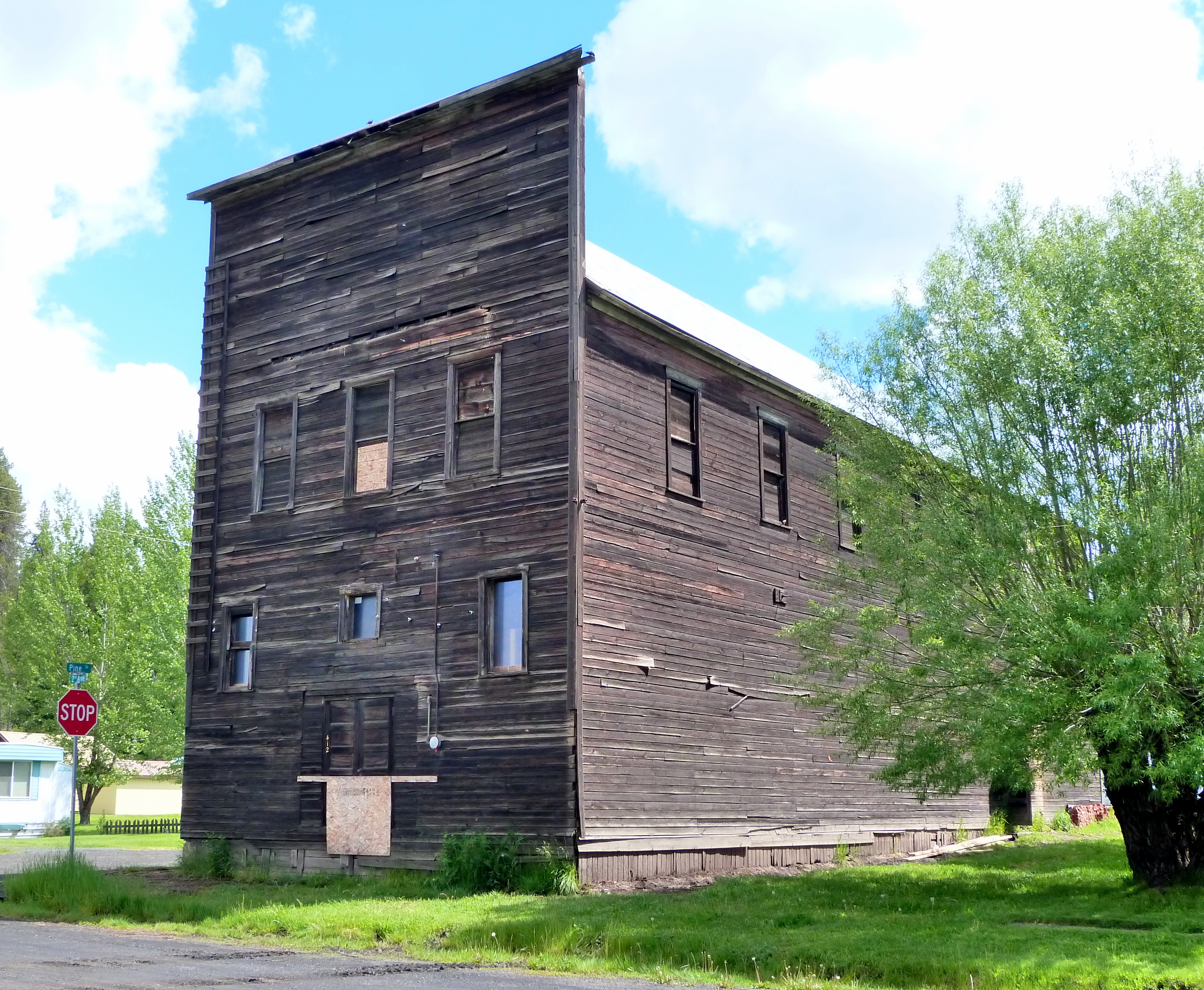
- Bovill Opera House

- Location of Bovill in Latah County, Idaho.
- Coordinates: 46°51′31″N 116°23′37″W
- Country: United States
- State: Idaho
- County: Latah

Area
  - Total: 0.16 sq mi (0.41 km^{2})
  - Land: 0.16 sq mi (0.41 km^{2})
  - Water: 0 sq mi (0.00 km^{2})
- Elevation: 2,868 ft (874 m)

Population (2020)
  - Total: 191
  - Density: 1,620.0/sq mi (625.48/km^{2})
- Time zone: UTC-8 (Pacific (PST))
  - Summer (DST): UTC-7 (PDT)
- ZIP code: 83806
- Area code: 208
- FIPS code: 16-09730
- GNIS feature ID: 2409886
- Website: www.cityofbovill.net

Bovill is a city in Latah County, Idaho, United States. As of the 2020 census, Bovill had a population of 191.

== History ==
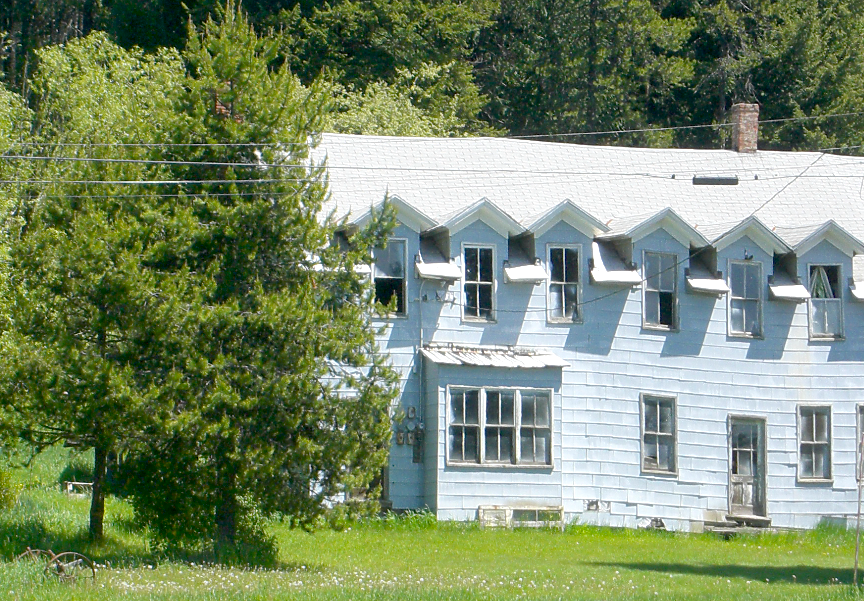
Historic Hotel Bovill

Bovill was named for a settler. Hugh Bovill was an Englishman who bought the Warren Meadows homestead in 1901 to ranch. With the rapid infusion of loggers, homesteaders, and sportsmen, Bovill and his wife Charlotte opened a hotel in 1903, which included a store and post office in 1907. The railroad arrived that same year and as logging activity increased nearby, the town became too wild for the couple and their two daughters, and they left for Coeur d'Alene in 1911; (Hugh died in 1935 in Oregon, Charlotte in 1947 in California).

On 15 April 1912, the workers at the Number 4 and Number 8 camp near Bovill of the Potlatch Lumber Company went on strike for better rations and a twenty-five cent per day pay raise. Notice of the strike was published in the Industrial Worker, a weekly newspaper of the Industrial Workers of the World which was published out of Spokane, Washington at the time.

The Bovill Opera House, at 2nd and Pine, was listed on the National Register of Historic Places in 2010.

== Geography ==
Bovill is located on the east bank of the Potlatch River.

According to the United States Census Bureau, the city has a total area of 0.19 square miles (0.49 km^{2}), all of it land.

== Demographics ==
Historical population
Census	Pop.	Note	%±
1920	589		—
1930	572		−2.9%
1940	447		−21.9%
1950	437		−2.2%
1960	357		−18.3%
1970	350		−2.0%
1980	289		−17.4%
1990	256		−11.4%
2000	305		19.1%
2010	260		−14.8%
2020	191		−26.5%
2019 (est.)	258		−0.8%
U.S. Decennial Census

=== 2010 census ===
As of the census of 2010, there were 260 people, 105 households, and 68 families residing in the city. The population density was 1,368.4 inhabitants per square mile (528.3/km^{2}). There were 127 housing units at an average density of 668.4 per square mile (258.1/km^{2}). The racial makeup of the city was 96.5% White and 3.5% from two or more races. Hispanic or Latino of any race were 0.4% of the population.

There were 105 households, of which 29.5% had children under the age of 18 living with them, 52.4% were married couples living together, 9.5% had a female householder with no husband present, 2.9% had a male householder with no wife present, and 35.2% were non-families. 27.6% of all households were made up of individuals, and 11.5% had someone living alone who was 65 years of age or older. The average household size was 2.48 and the average family size was 3.03.

The median age in the city was 43 years. 25.4% of residents were under the age of 18; 7.4% were between the ages of 18 and 24; 20.3% were from 25 to 44; 32% were from 45 to 64; and 15% were 65 years of age or older. The gender makeup of the city was 51.5% male and 48.5% female.

The median home price in Bovill was an estimated $72,500 in 2011.

=== 2000 census ===
As of the census of 2000, there were 305 people, 116 households, and 82 families residing in the city. The population density was 1,701.6 inhabitants per square mile (657.0/km^{2}). There were 128 housing units at an average density of 714.1 per square mile (275.7/km^{2}). The racial makeup of the city was 96.07% White, 0.33% Native American, 0.98% Asian, 0.33% from other races, and 2.30% from two or more races. Hispanic or Latino of any race were 2.95% of the population.

There were 116 households, out of which 36.2% had children under the age of 18 living with them, 62.9% were married couples living together, 6.0% had a female householder with no husband present, and 29.3% were non-families. 22.4% of all households were made up of individuals, and 8.6% had someone living alone who was 65 years of age or older. The average household size was 2.63 and the average family size was 3.13.

In the city, the population was spread out, with 28.2% under the age of 18, 6.9% from 18 to 24, 29.8% from 25 to 44, 27.2% from 45 to 64, and 7.9% who were 65 years of age or older. The median age was 36 years. For every 100 females, there were 106.1 males. For every 100 females age 18 and over, there were 102.8 males.

The median income for a household in the city was $36,875, and the median income for a family was $41,827. Males had a median income of $33,750 versus $21,875 for females. The per capita income for the city was $12,471. About 14.1% of families and 18.1% of the population were below the poverty line, including 24.0% of those under the age of eighteen and none of those 65 or over.

== Bovill in literature ==
In the 2009 novel Patriots: A Novel of Survival in the Coming Collapse, a handful of Midwestern people relocate from Chicago to a retreat near Bovill due to hyperinflation and subsequent economic collapse of the United States.
