= Idaho State Highway 9 =

State highway in Latah County, Idaho, United States

State Highway 9
- SH-9 highlighted in red

Route information
- Maintained by ITD
- Length: 13.522 mi (21.762 km)

Major junctions
- South end: SH-8 west of Deary
- North end: SH-6 west of Harvard

Location
- Country: United States
- State: Idaho
- Counties: Latah

Highway system
- Idaho State Highway System; Interstate; US; State
← SH-8	→ SH-11

State Highway 9 (SH-9) is a 13.522-mile (21.762 km) state highway in Latah County, Idaho, United States. It connects SH-8 just west of Deary with SH-6 near Harvard.

== Route description ==
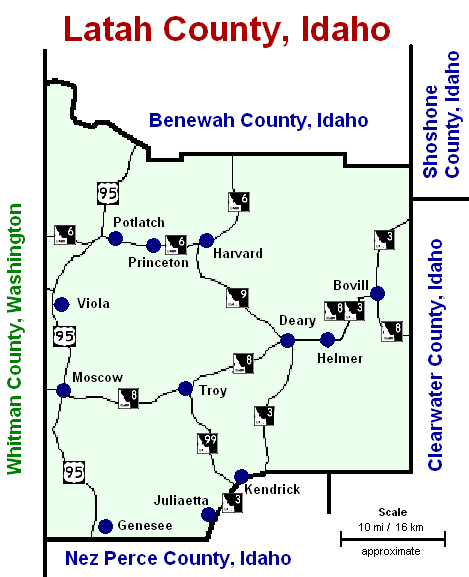
Major roads in Latah County with SH-9 in the center

SH-9 begins just west of Deary at an intersection with SH-8, which continues toward Moscow and Helmer. The highway travels north-northwesterly through rural areas along the eastern edge of the Palouse Range for its entire course, generally following a former railroad last used by the BNSF Railway. SH-9 passes south of Avon and through Stanford before reaching the Palouse River near its northern terminus at SH-6 just west of Harvard. SH-6 continues onward to Potlatch and Saint Joe National Forest from the intersection.

== History ==
The Lewis and Clark Highway, from Lewiston eastward to Lolo Pass, was designated State Highway 9 in 1916 and construction began in 1920. Upon its completion in 1962, it became U.S. Route 12.

SH-9 was the last state highway in Idaho to be paved (though, as of 2012, Idaho State Highway 29 and Idaho State Highway 64 still have unpaved sections).

== Major intersections ==
The entire route is in Latah County.

Location	mi	km	Destinations	Notes
	0.000	0.000	SH-8 – Deary, Bovill, Troy	Southern terminus
	13.522	21.762	SH-6 – Potlatch, St. Maries	Northern terminus
1.000 mi = 1.609 km; 1.000 km = 0.621 mi

== See also ==
- List of state highways in Idaho
