= Harvard, Idaho =

Unincorporated community in Idaho, United States

- Unincorporated community
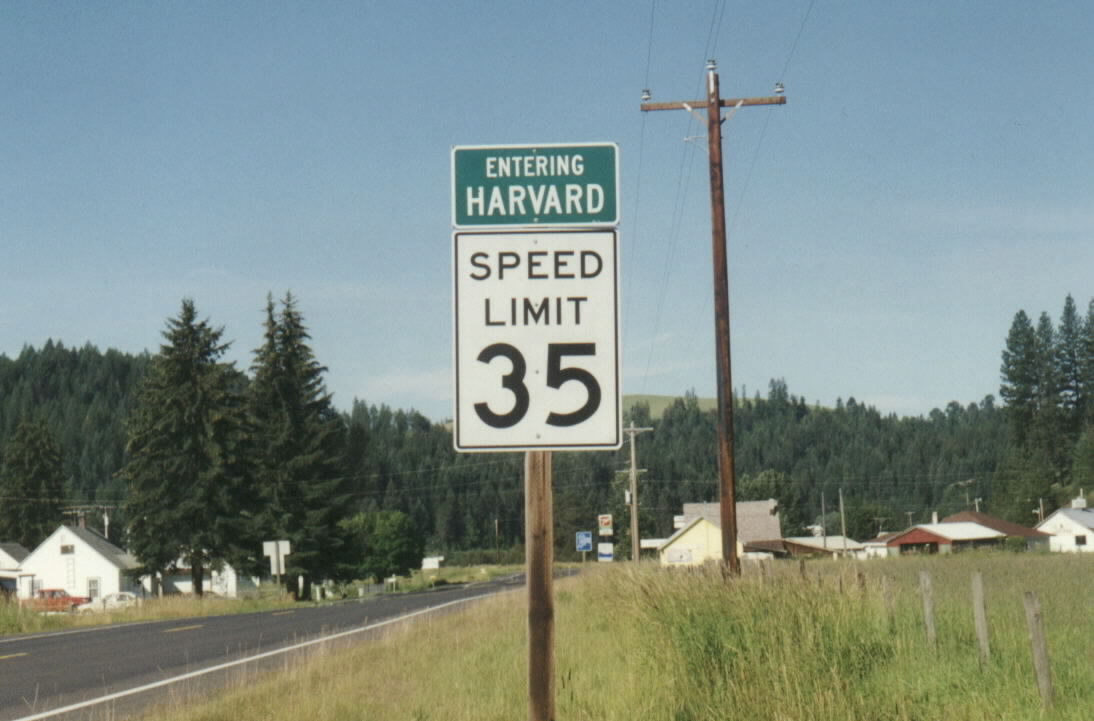
- Harvard in 1997

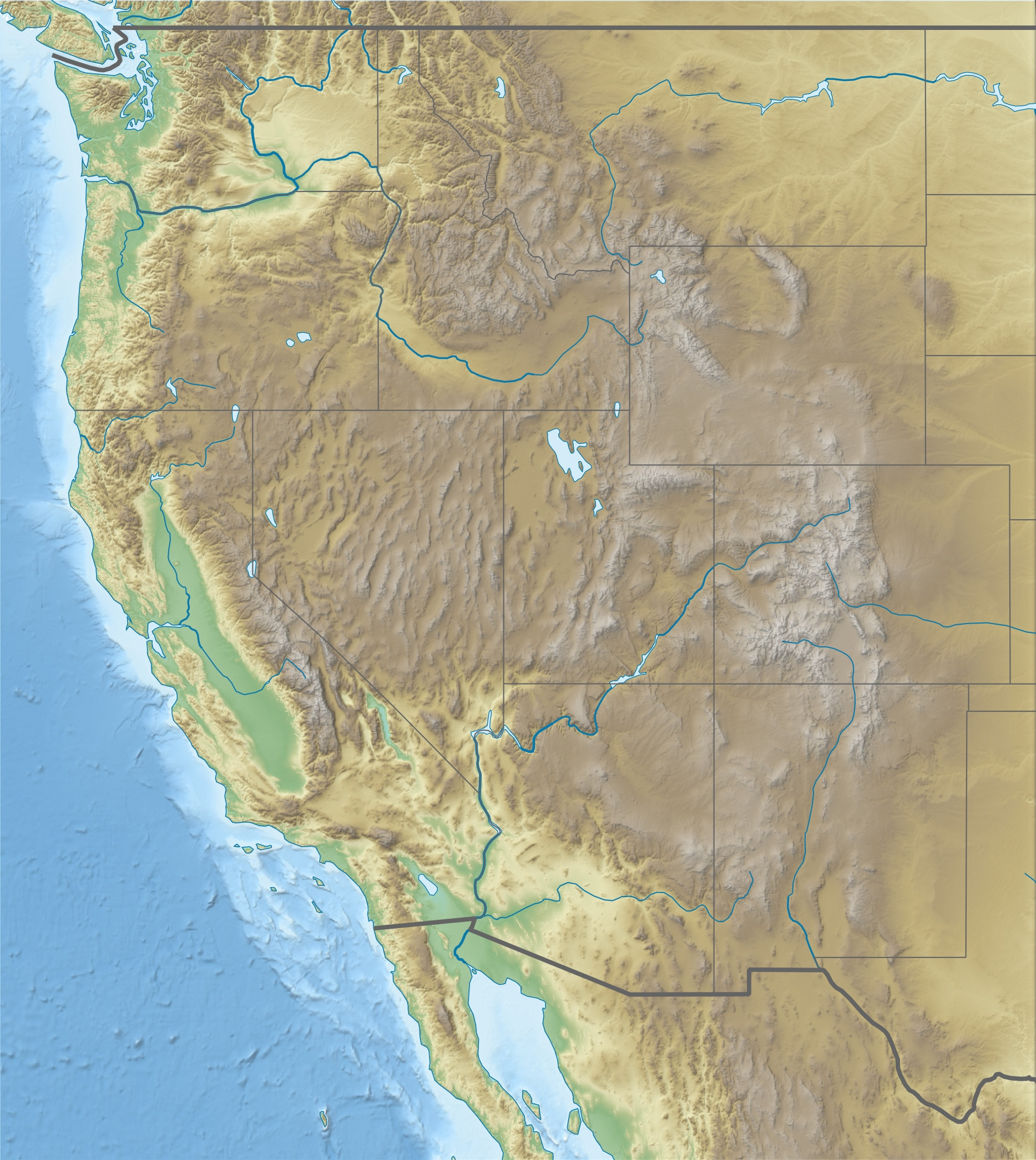
- Location within Idaho Location within USA West
- Coordinates: 46°55′03″N 116°43′47″W
- Country: United States
- State: Idaho
- County: Latah
- Elevation: 2,576 ft (785 m)
- Time zone: UTC-8 (Pacific (PST))
  - Summer (DST): UTC-7 (PDT)
- ZIP code: 83834
- Area codes: 208, 986
- GNIS feature ID: 396618

Harvard is an unincorporated community in the northwest United States, on the Palouse of north central Idaho in Latah County.

Located on the Palouse River, eight miles (13 km) east of Potlatch on State Highway 6, Harvard has a post office with ZIP code 83834.

Nearby is Camp Grizzly, a Boy Scout summer camp; it is approximately three miles (5 km) upstream to the northeast, at the base of the Hoodoo Mountains.

== History ==
Harvard was founded in 1906 when the Washington, Idaho and Montana Railway was extended to that point. The community was named after Harvard University, and its post office has been in operation since 1906.

The railroad slated it to be called "Canfield" after landowner Homer Canfield, who did not want the honor. He suggested "Harvard" as a complement to the existing Princeton, five miles (8 km) west, which was named after Princeton, Minnesota.

Other locations in the vicinity with collegiate names include Cornell, Purdue, Stanford, Vassar, Wellesley, and Yale. Some were intended, others were coincidental.

Harvard's population was estimated at 200 in 1909, and was 50 in 1960.
