= North–South Ski Bowl =

North-South Ski Bowl
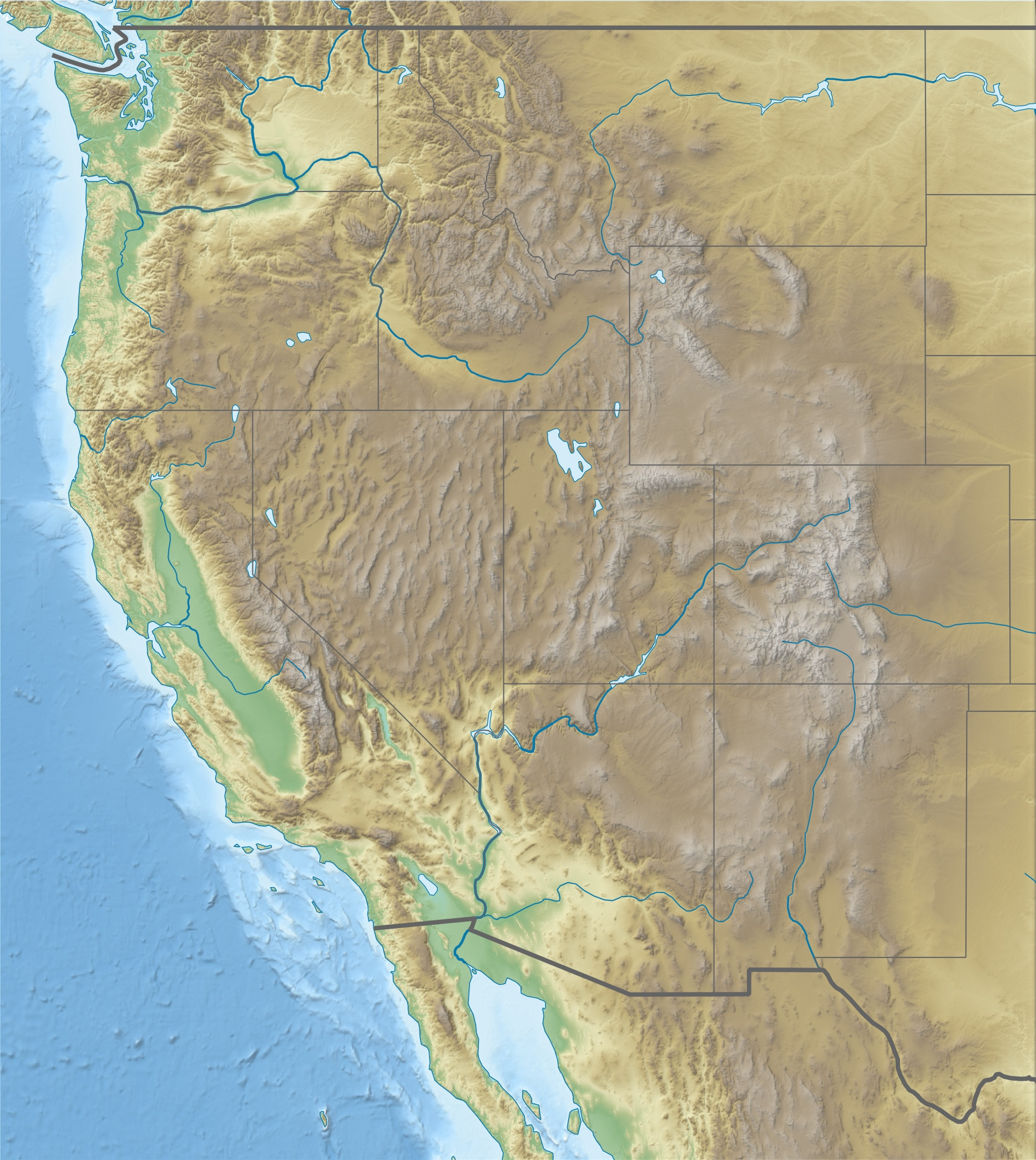
- Location in the western United States North-South Ski Bowl (Idaho)
- Location: St. Joe National Forest (Idaho Panhandle N.F.); Benewah County, Idaho, U.S.
- Nearest city: Emida – 10 mi (16 km); Moscow – 40 mi (65 km)
- Coordinates: 47.066°N 116.660°W
- Vertical: 398 ft (121 m)
- Top elevation: 3,788 ft (1,155 m) AMSL
- Base elevation: 3,390 ft (1,033 m)
- Skiable area: 28 acres (11 ha)
- Lift system: 1 chairlift, 1 surface tow
- Snowmaking: none
- Night skiing: 22 acres (9 ha)

North–South Ski Bowl was a modest ski area in the western United States, located in northern Idaho in the Hoodoo Mountains of southern Benewah County.

Its bowl-shaped slope in the Idaho Panhandle National Forest faced northeast and the vertical drop was just under 400 feet (120 m) on Dennis Mountain, accessed from State Highway 6, south of Emida and north of Harvard. An "upside-down" ski area, the parking lot and lodge were at the top, less than a mile east of the highway, formerly designated as 95A (U.S. 95 Alternate). The access road meets the highway at its crest ("Harvard Hill"), just under 3,600 feet (1,100 m), and climbs about two hundred feet (60 m); the border with Latah County is approximately two miles (3 km) south.

== History ==
With a day lodge built in the late 1930s by the Civilian Conservation Corps (CCC) through the Works Progress Administration (WPA), the ski area was developed by the U.S. Forest Service, and originally owned and operated by Washington State College (Pullman is approximately fifty miles (80 km) southwest, about an hour by vehicle). In the early 1950s, it was known as the "St. Joe Ski Bowl," and prior to that as the "Emida Ski Bowl." After a poor snow year in 1958, it was sold to a private owner, Fred Cramer and his brother, Merle, and a platter lift was added in 1959.

It was the primary training area for the WSU and UI intercollegiate ski teams, and included a ski jump. The Ramskull Ski club formed in 1960, named for the creek of the ski area. The road from the highway was improved and parking areas expanded in 1962.

Closed for the 1969–70 season, the students of WSU (ASWSU) regained ownership and operated North–South until 1980. Additions included a chairlift in 1970, and a new lodge in 1976, and the area was lit for night skiing. The area got into financial difficulty in 1979, and the students searched for a buyer. After leasing it to a private operator in 1980 for four seasons, ASWSU sold the area outright in 1984.

== Present day ==
With an aging chairlift and inconsistent snowfall at a low elevation, alpine skiing was discontinued in the 1990s. The entrance area near the highway is now a "Park 'n' Ski" area for cross-country skiing and the top of the former ski area is home to Palouse Divide Lodge, a private conference and retreat facility.

== See also ==
- Tamarack Ski Area – near Troy (defunct)
