= Idaho State Highway 66 =

State highway in Latah County, Idaho, United States

State Highway 66
- SH-66 highlighted in red

Route information
- Maintained by ITD
- Length: 0.992 mi (1,596 m)

Major junctions
- West end: Palouse Cove Road at Washington state line
- East end: US 95 near Viola

Location
- Country: United States
- State: Idaho
- Counties: Latah

Highway system
- Idaho State Highway System; Interstate; US; State
← SH-64	→ SH-67

State Highway 66 (SH-66) is a state highway located entirely within Latah County, Idaho, United States. It travels for less than one mile (1.6 km) from Palouse Cove Road at the Washington state line to U.S. Route 95 (US-95) north of Viola. The highway is maintained by the Idaho Transportation Department.

== Route description ==
SH-66 begins at the Washington state line as a continuation of Palouse Cove Road, which connects to the city of Palouse. From the state line, the highway travels southeast through a rural area and turns east to reach its terminus at US-95 north of Viola. The route is a two-lane undivided road for its entire length.

== Major intersections ==
The entire route is in Latah County.

Location	mi	km	Destinations	Notes
	0.000	0.000	Palouse Cove Road	Continuation into Washington
	0.992	1.596	US 95 – Potlatch, Moscow, Lewiston	Eastern terminus
1.000 mi = 1.609 km; 1.000 km = 0.621 mi
