= Onaway, Idaho =

- City
- Location of Onaway in Latah County, Idaho.
- Coordinates: 46°55′42″N 116°53′23″W
- Country: United States
- State: Idaho
- County: Latah

Area
  - Total: 0.15 sq mi (0.39 km^{2})
  - Land: 0.15 sq mi (0.39 km^{2})
  - Water: 0 sq mi (0.00 km^{2})
- Elevation: 2,615 ft (797 m)

Population (2020)
  - Total: 196
  - Density: 1,255.7/sq mi (484.81/km^{2})
- Time zone: UTC-8 (Pacific (PST))
  - Summer (DST): UTC-7 (PDT)
- ZIP code: 83855
- Area code: 208
- FIPS code: 16-58870
- GNIS feature ID: 2411322

Onaway is a city in Latah County, Idaho, United States. As of the 2020 census, Onaway had a population of 196.

The name sources from the mill works at nearby Potlatch to the west, as workers would frequent the bars after work. When a wife called and asked where her husband was, she would be told he was "Onaway" home. Onaway is located between Potlatch and Princeton on State Highway 6.

== Geography ==
According to the United States Census Bureau, the city has a total area of 0.15 square miles (0.39 km^{2}), all of it land.

== Demographics ==
Historical population
Census	Pop.	Note	%±
1960	191		—
1970	166		−13.1%
1980	254		53.0%
1990	203		−20.1%
2000	230		13.3%
2010	187		−18.7%
2020	196		4.8%
2019 (est.)	188		0.5%
U.S. Decennial Census

=== 2010 census ===
As of the census of 2010, there were 187 people, 85 households, and 63 families residing in the city. The population density was 1,246.7 inhabitants per square mile (481.4/km^{2}). There were 90 housing units at an average density of 600.0 per square mile (231.7/km^{2}). The racial makeup of the city was 100.0% White. Hispanic or Latino of any race were 1.1% of the population.

There were 85 households, of which 24.7% had children under the age of 18 living with them, 56.5% were married couples living together, 12.9% had a female householder with no husband present, 4.7% had a male householder with no wife present, and 25.9% were non-families. 22.4% of all households were made up of individuals, and 7.1% had someone living alone who was 65 years of age or older. The average household size was 2.20, and the average family size was 2.49.

The median age in the city was 48.8 years. 17.1% of residents were under the age of 18; 4.3% were between the ages of 18 and 24; 25.7% were from 25 to 44; 32.1% were from 45 to 64; and 20.9% were 65 years of age or older. The gender makeup of the city was 51.9% male and 48.1% female.

=== 2000 census ===
As of the census of 2000, there were 230 people, 83 households, and 63 families residing in the city. The population density was 1,546.4 inhabitants per square mile (597.1/km^{2}). There were 86 housing units at an average density of 578.2 per square mile (223.2/km^{2}). The racial makeup of the city was 94.78% White, 0.43% Native American, 0.43% Asian, and 4.35% from two or more races. Hispanic or Latino of any race were 3.48% of the population.

There were 83 households, out of which 37.3% had children under the age of 18 living with them, 65.1% were married couples living together, 7.2% had a female householder with no husband present, and 22.9% were non-families. 15.7% of all households were made up of individuals, and 8.4% had someone living alone who was 65 years of age or older. The average household size was 2.77, and the average family size was 3.06. In the city, the population was spread out, with 29.6% under the age of 18, 7.0% from 18 to 24, 27.0% from 25 to 44, 26.5% from 45 to 64, and 10.0% who were 65 years of age or older. The median age was 35 years. For every 100 females, there were 98.3 males. For every 100 females age 18 and over, there were 110.4 males.

The median income for a household in the city was $39,821, and the median income for a family was $44,464. Males had a median income of $35,357 versus $23,000 for females. The per capita income for the city was $15,211. About 6.0% of families and 9.4% of the population were below the poverty line, including 10.8% of those under the age of eighteen and 29.4% of those 65 or over.

== See also ==
- List of cities in Idaho
