= Tamarack Ski Area (Troy, Idaho) =

Ski area in Idaho, United States

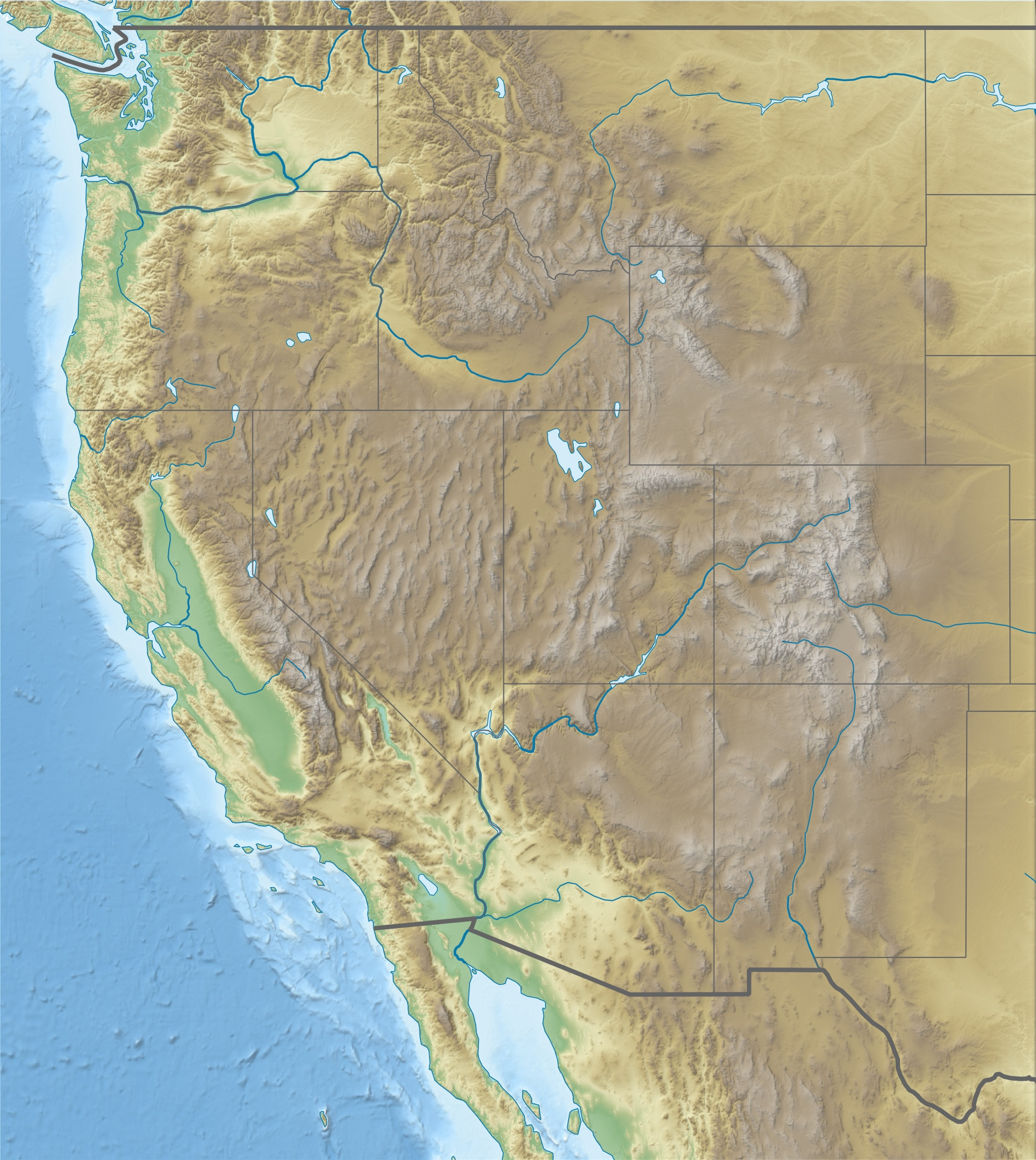
- Location in the western United States Location in Idaho
- Location: East Moscow Mountain; Latah County, Idaho, U.S.
- Nearest city: Troy - 7 mi (11 km); Moscow - 17 mi (27 km)
- Coordinates: 46.8029°N 116.8295°W
- Vertical: 600 ft (180 m)
- Top elevation: 4,400 ft (1,340 m) AMSL
- Base elevation: 3,800 ft (1,160 m)
- Lift system: 1 T-bar; 1 rope tow
- Snowmaking: none
- Night skiing: none

Tamarack Ski Area is a former ski area in the western United States, located in north central Idaho, seven miles (11 km) northwest of Troy in Latah County.

== History ==
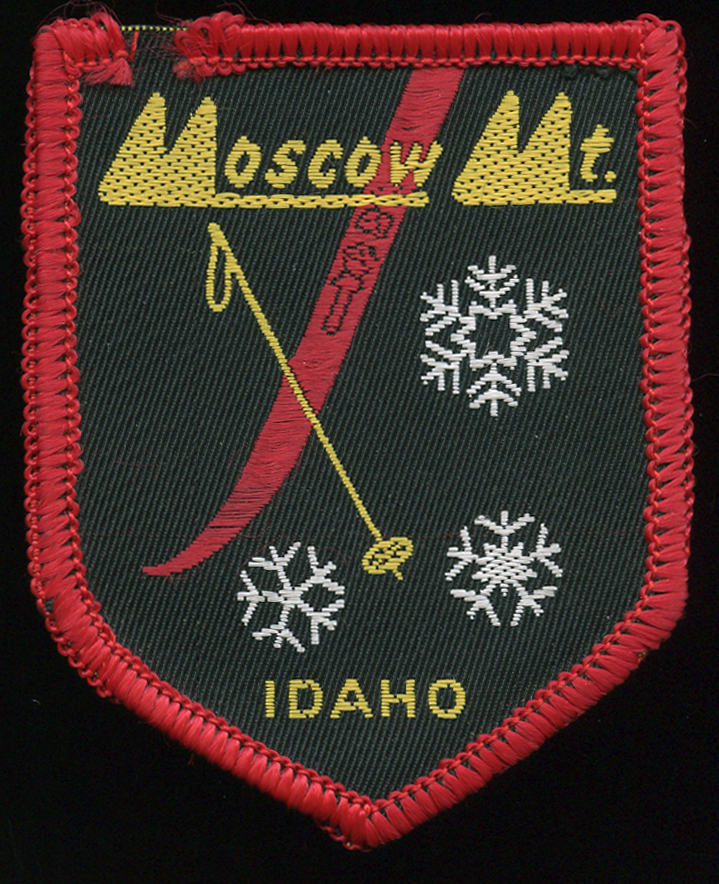
Tamarack Ski Area patch from the collection of Steven R. Shook.

The ski area opened in January 1966, just below the summit of East Moscow Mountain on Tamarack Road, its slopes faced east and southeast. The area had various owners and, due to varying snowfall, was open intermittently for several decades. The land on which the ski area operated was owned by the city of Troy. Known as "Moscow Mountain Ski Area" during its first few months, it was renamed Tamarack in the fall of 1966.

It operated two surface lifts: a T-bar and a rope tow, with a vertical drop of 600 feet (180 m). The lift-served summit was at an elevation of 4,400 ft (1,340 m) [[Height above mean sea level}above sea level]]; a three-story A-frame structure served as the day lodge. Tamarack's target market was Moscow and Pullman, Washington, and primarily its respective students at the University of Idaho and Washington State University.

Overlooking the Palouse region, the elevation at the lookout atop East Moscow Mountain is 4,721 ft (1,439 m) and the absolute summit of the mountain to the west is 4,983 ft (1,519 m).

== Termination ==
Owed back taxes, Latah County seized the leasehold improvements (equipment & buildings) and put up for auction in February 1992, but there were no takers for the minimum bid of $21,000. The city of Troy sued the leaseholders and entered in an agreement with the county to pay the back taxes after the sale of the T-bar lift in April, which started at a minimum bid of $1,900.

The lift was purchased by Cottonwood Butte ski area near Cottonwood; Tamarack's A-frame day lodge was later demolished and its foundation removed.

== See also ==
- North–South Ski Bowl – near Emida (defunct)
- Bald Mountain Ski Area – near Pierce (active)
- Ski Bluewood – near Dayton, Washington (active)
