= Emida, Idaho =

Unincorporated community in the state of Idaho, United States

- Town
- Location within Idaho
- Coordinates: 47°06′57″N 116°35′53″W
- Country: United States
- State: Idaho
- County: Benewah
- Elevation: 2,851 ft (869 m)

Population (2000)
  - Total: 684
- Time zone: UTC-8 (Pacific Time Zone)
  - Summer (DST): UTC-7
- ZIP code: 83830
- Area code: 208
- GNIS feature ID: 381459

Emida is a small unincorporated community in Benewah County, Idaho, United States, located on the east side of State Highway 6.

== History ==
The Coeur d’Alene people inhabited this area for thousands of years prior to the coming of white settlers. The native name of the area is Epschssups'n or “It has a little tail.”

The name Emida is a composite of three settlers: East, Miller, and Dawson.

Emida's population was 125 in 1960.

== Demographics ==
The 2000 census recorded a population of 684 with an average household income of $27,578. The median age in the tabulation area is 41.2 and the average household size is 2.51.

== Schools ==
Within the St. Maries School District #41, the town's children go to the K-6 Upriver school in Fernwood, then St. Maries Middle School and St. Maries High School in St. Maries. Emida formerly operated its own school, built in 1939.

== Ski area ==
Southwest of Emida and just east of Highway 6 is the site of North–South Ski Bowl, a former alpine ski area in the Hoodoo Mountains. Once owned by Washington State University in Pullman, and later by its students, it was also known as the St. Joe Ski Bowl, and the Emida Ski Bowl. With an aging chairlift and inconsistent snowfall at a low elevation, alpine skiing was discontinued in the 1990s. The access from the highway is now a "Park 'n Ski" area for cross-country skiing and the ski area is home to the Palouse Divide Lodge, a private retreat.
