= Onaway =

Onaway may refer to a location in the United States:

- Onaway, Idaho
- Onaway, Michigan
- Onaway (Jefferson, New Hampshire), a historic cottage in the Waumbek Cottages Historic District in Jefferson, New Hampshire
