= Vassar, Idaho =

Unincorporated community in Idaho, United States

Coordinates: 46°49′45″N 116°37′02″W

Vassar is an unincorporated community in Latah County, in the U.S. state of Idaho.

== History ==
The community was probably named for James R. Vassar, an early settler.
