= Moscow High School =

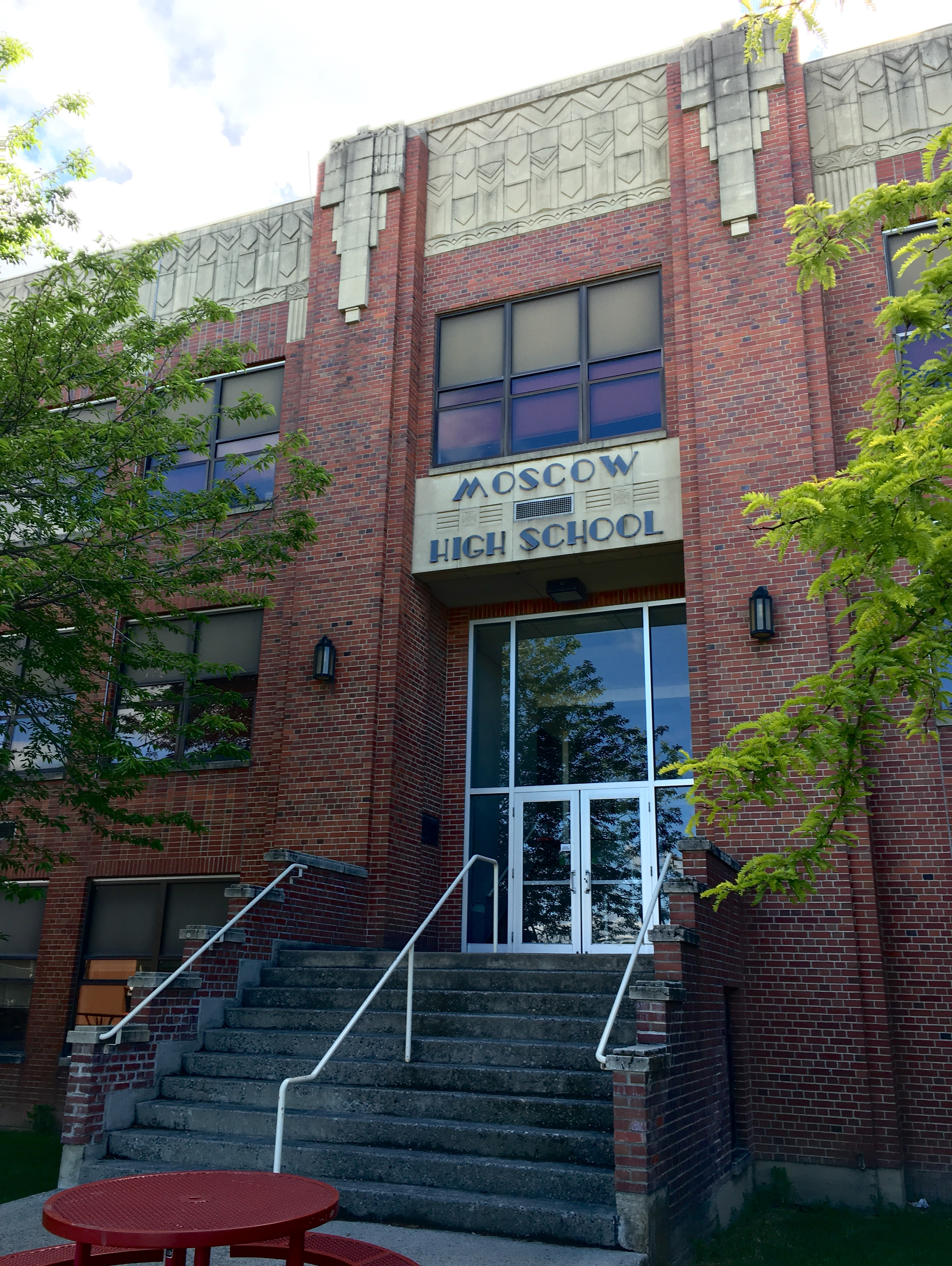
- West courtyard entrance in 2016

Location
- 402 E. Fifth Street; Moscow, Idaho 83843; United States; 46°43′55″N 116°59′49″W

Information
- Type: Public high school
- Motto: Pride of the North
- Established: 1892, 1939 (current)
- School district: Moscow S.D. (#281)
- NCES School ID: 160222000394
- Principal: Erik Perryman (2013–present)
- Teaching staff: 44.67 (FTE)
- Grades: 9–12 (10–12 1966–2012)
- Enrollment: 810 (2023-2024)
- Student to teacher ratio: 18.13
- Campus size: 3.9 acres (1.6 ha)
- Colors: Red, Black, & White
- Fight song: The Moscow Fight SOng
- Athletics: IHSAA Class 5A
- Athletics conference: Inland Empire League (5A)
- Mascot: Bear
- Rivals: Pullman, Lewiston
- Publication: Inner Visions (art & literary magazine)
- Yearbook: Bear Tracks
- Elevation: 2,620 ft (800 m) AMSL
- Website: mhs.msd281.org

Moscow High School (MHS) is a four-year public high school in Moscow, Idaho, United States. The flagship school of the Moscow School District serves grades 9–12. Since 2013, Erik Perryman has served as principal. MHS colors are red, black, and white, and the mascot is a bear.

The school district (which serves as the high school's attendance boundary) includes Moscow and Viola. On the Palouse in north central Idaho, Moscow is the home of the University of Idaho.

== Campus ==
Less than three blocks east of Main Street on a moderate slope, its current compact campus opened 87 years ago in 1939, with wings added in 1968 and 1991. The previous high school of 1912 is across Third Street to the north; it was used as the junior high until 1959 and is now the "1912 Center." The original high school of 1892 was on the site of the present north wing; it was later Whitworth grade school and was razed in 1939.

Originally a four-year high school, MHS was a senior high school (grades 10–12) for 46 years, beginning in 1966. The school district reconfigured in 2012 and Moscow High returned to a four-year school in August with the addition of the freshman class. A summer asbestos removal project was initiated in 2014 and extended into the school year due to delays.

An attempt to fund a new campus on the northeast edge of the city (east of Mountain View Park; 46.744°N 116.969°W) was defeated by voters 21 years ago in 2005. The levy needed a two-thirds majority to pass and was defeated with only 44% in favor. Twenty seven years earlier in 1978, the state education department's supervisor of support services completed a study of the campus and recommended that the site be sold and a new high school built elsewhere.

In the oldest part of Moscow, the MHS campus became the location of an archeological dig by the university's department of sociology and anthropology in autumn 2019.

== Athletics ==
Moscow's athletic teams compete in IHSAA Class 5A, the second-highest in the state, in the Inland Empire League (5A). MHS competed against the largest schools in Idaho in Class A-1 (now 6A) until the fall of 1979. It was dropped a classification level in 1976, but successfully appealed for three years to stay. Moscow opted not to petition in 1979 and went down to A-2 (now 4A), and moved between A-2 and A-1 (Div. II) until the new IHSAA classification system placed them in 4A in 2001. After another reclassification in 2024, 4A became 5A.

=== Baseball ===
Moscow's most successful run in athletics came in baseball under longtime head coach Gary Johnson. In an eight-season stretch from 1978 through 1985, the Bears were in seven state title games and won five, including three consecutive (1982–84). The Bears won their sixth state baseball championship in 2024, defeating perennial powerhouse Bishop Kelly 7–6 in the Idaho Class 4A championship game under head coach Griffin Rod, their first state baseball title since 1984.

=== Basketball ===
The early MHS basketball team won four straight Idaho titles (1917–20), and more recently, the girls' basketball team won three consecutive A-2 state championships (1992–94) and another in 1996 for four in five years. The boys team was an A2 state champion in 1980 finishing the season with a losing record. In the 1983–1984 season, the state of Idaho was the "test state" for the 3-point line for the entire nation for high schoolers. That season there was tremendous excitement which attracted large crowds to the games. That same year an unusual requirement from the state was created as there were only two teams in the league at that time; Moscow and Orofino. The state required the two teams to play a "Best of 3" series. Moscow won the Best of 3 district championship after losing both league games during the season. That team then had to play a "regional championship" at a neutral site. The Bears were an A-2 state finalist in 1996 and state champion again in 1997, winning their last twenty games.

=== Volleyball ===
The volleyball team was undefeated (29–0) in the fall of 2005 to claim their only state title.

=== Soccer ===
In 1999, the boys' soccer team went 16-5-1 (.750) and won the state title, defeating Boise High 1–0 in overtime.

In 2025, the girls' soccer team went 14-3-3 (.775) and won the state title, defeating Vallivue High 1-0 in the second overtime.

=== Football ===
Moscow's football program was strong in Class A-1 in the late 1960s and early 1970s; the 1968 Bears were undefeated at 9–0. The 1968 and 1969 teams both finished second in the state writers' polls to undefeated Borah of Boise. Moscow went 9–1 in 1971 and was fourth in the final poll, 9–0 in 1975 and again polled fourth. After the move down to A-2 in 1979 and the addition of playoffs, the Bears won state titles in 1981 and 1992.

=== Mascot ===
Exactly when the bear became the school mascot is not well documented, but the Lewiston Morning Tribune referred to the MHS basketball team as the "Bears" in early 1927. Alumnus and head coach Lyle Smith obtained a live bear cub for a mascot in 1941. The present school colors were noted in 1936.

=== Facilities ===
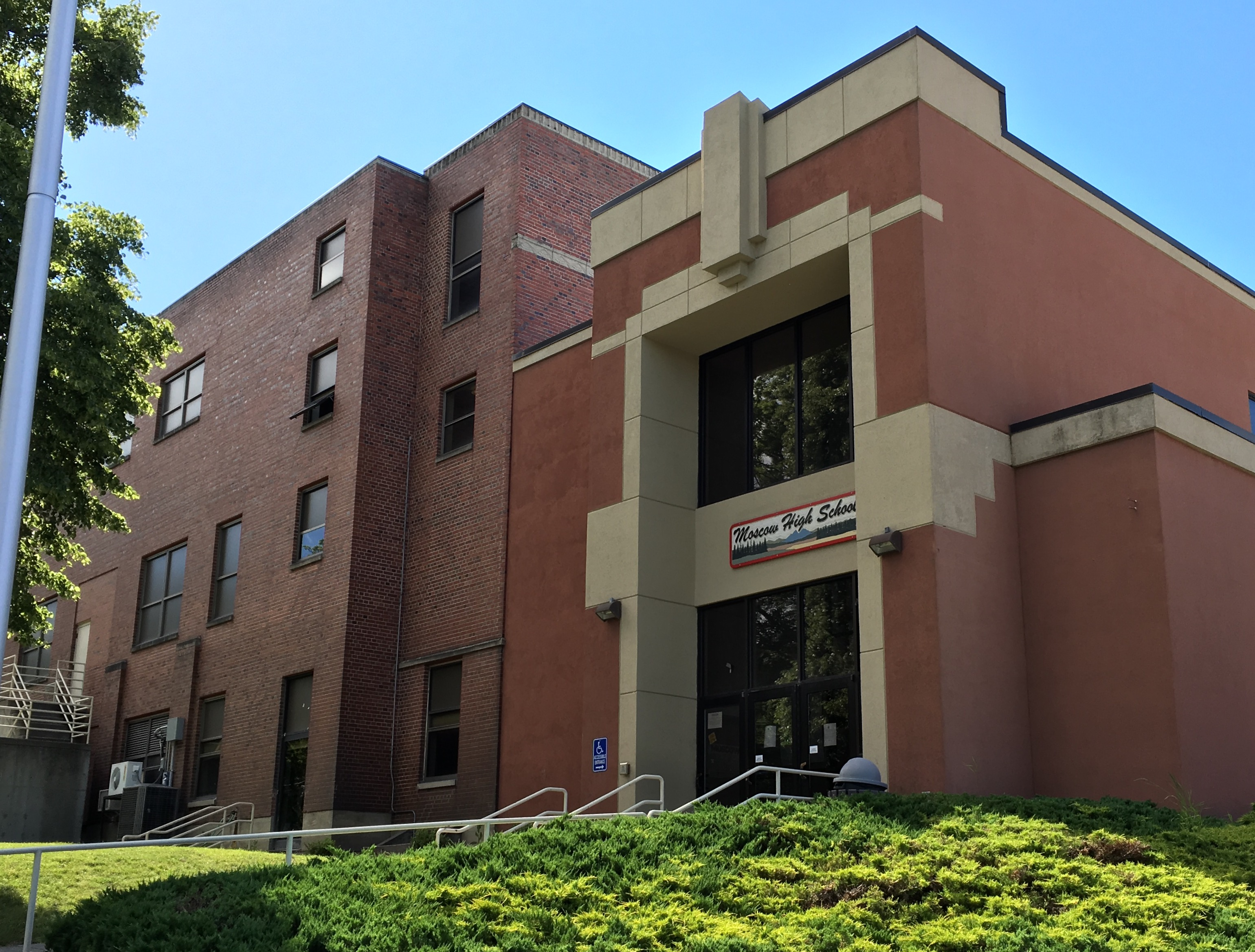
North street entry in 2016

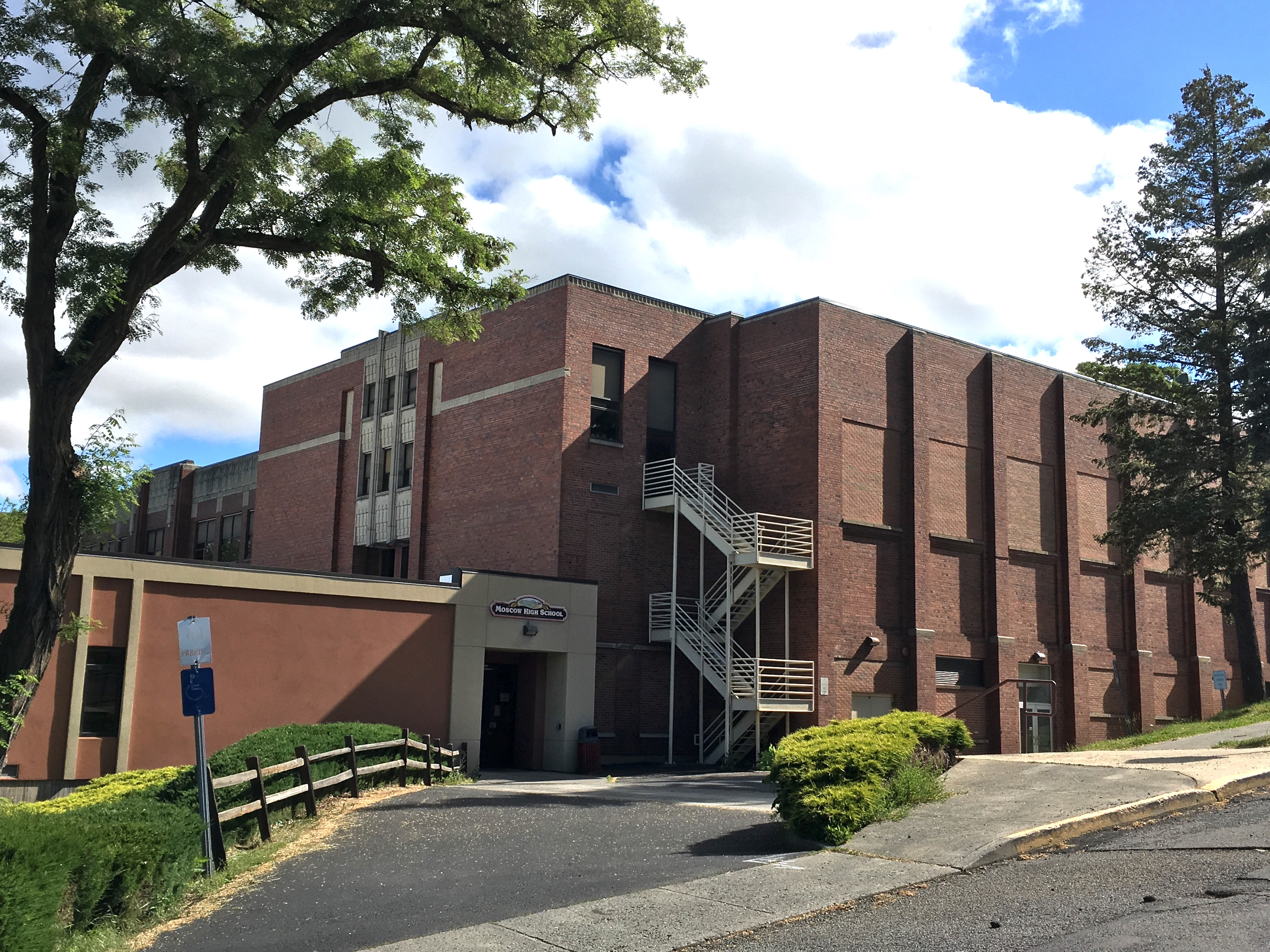
South street entry in 2016

Due to limited space on its 3.9-acre (1.6 ha) campus, the varsity athletic facilities are located approximately a mile (1.6 km) northeast at Bear Field (and Bear Den gym), adjacent to Moscow Middle School and the school district headquarters (46.739°N 116.982°W). In 1976 and 1979, Moscow played its home football games across town at the Kibbie Dome on the University of Idaho campus, and again in 1996, when the running track at Bear Field was being replaced. Opened 60 years ago in early 1966, the Bear Den was originally known as the fieldhouse.

State playoff and championship football games in all classifications are regularly held in the Kibbie Dome.

=== Rivals ===
Moscow's oldest rivalries are with Pullman, Lewiston, and Coeur d'Alene.

A longtime member of the Inland Empire League of north Idaho, MHS currently competes with Lakeland, Lewiston and Sandpoint in the IEL's 5A division. Lakeland (in Rathdrum) is about 100 miles (160 km) north of Moscow and Sandpoint is even further. (The IEL's 6A division has three teams: Coeur d'Alene, Lake City, and Post Falls.)

=== State titles ===
==== Boys ====
- Football (2): fall (A-2, now 3A) 1981, 1992 (official with introduction of playoffs, fall 1979 (A-1) 1978 (A-2))
- Soccer (1): fall (A-1, now 5A) 1999
- Basketball (10): (one class) 1917, 1918, 1919, 1920, 1923, 1933, 1934; (A-1, now 5A) 1972, (A-2, now 3A) 1980, 1997
- Baseball (6): (A-1, now 5A) 1978, (A-2, now 3A) 1980, 1982, 1983, 1984, (4A) 2024. (baseball records not kept by IHSAA; A-1 tournament started in 1971, A-2 in 1980)
- Track (1): (4A) 2008; also four co-titles (north): 1939–42
- Golf (2): (B, now 3A) 1997, (4A) 2009

==== Girls ====
- Volleyball (1): fall (4A) 2005
- Basketball (6): (A-2, now 3A) 1981, 1982, 1992, 1993, 1994, 1996
- Track (3): (A-2, now 3A) 1992, (4A) 2006, (5A) 2025
- Soccer (1): (5A) 2025
- Golf (2): (4A) 2010, 2011

== Club activities ==
- Environmental Club goes on a yearly "Turtle Trip" to a beach near Tomatlán, Mexico, to assist in the conservation of Olive ridley sea turtles.
- Knowledge Bowl and Science Bowl clubs participate in timed regional competitions in which teams attempt to answer questions before their opponents.

== Notable alumni ==
- Hec Edmundson – college basketball and track head coach at Idaho and Washington, state's first Olympian (track: 800 m, 1912), Class of 1906 (UI Prep)
- Guy Wicks – college basketball and baseball head coach at Idaho, Class of 1920 (circa)
- Lyle Smith – football head coach and athletic director at Boise State, Class of 1934
- Nancy Jackson - American alpinist, Class of 1972
- Kim Goetz – college basketball player, Class of 1975
- Dan Monson – college basketball head coach, Class of 1980
- Andrea Lloyd-Curry – professional basketball player, Women's Basketball Hall of Fame (inducted 2007), won gold at 1988 Olympics, Class of 1983
- Doug Riesenberg – NFL lineman, Super Bowl champion, Class of 1983
- Julia Gaines, percussionist, Class of 1987
- Megan Griffiths – filmmaker, Class of 1993
- Josh Ritter – critically acclaimed singer/songwriter, Class of 1995
- Samuel D. Hunter – playwright, Class of 2000
- James George – Emmy-award winning artist and entrepreneur, Class of 2004
- Shay Hatten - screenwriter noted for John Wick: Chapter 3, Army of Thieves, and other films Class of 2012
