= Viola, Idaho =

Unincorporated community in the state of Idaho, United States

Coordinates: 46°50′20″N 117°01′08″W

Viola is an unincorporated community and census-designated place in Latah County, Idaho, United States. It has a post office with a ZIP code of 83872, and lies on U.S. Route 95, south of its intersection with State Highway 66 and north of Moscow.

As of the 2020 census, Viola had a population of 135.

The community is in the Moscow School District, which operates Moscow High School.

== Notable people ==
- Dan Foreman, state senator
