= Princeton, Idaho =

Ceneus-designated place in Latah County, Idaho, United States

- Census-designated place
- Location in Latah County, Idaho

- Location in Idaho Location in the United States
- Coordinates: 46°54′55″N 116°49′53″W
- Country: United States
- State: Idaho
- County: Latah

Area
  - Total: 0.640 sq mi (1.66 km^{2})
  - Land: 0.637 sq mi (1.65 km^{2})
  - Water: 0.003 sq mi (0.0078 km^{2})
- Elevation: 2,520 ft (770 m)

Population (2020 census)
  - Total: 193
  - Density: 303/sq mi (117/km^{2})
- Time zone: UTC-8 (Pacific (PST))
  - Summer (DST): UTC-7 (PDT)
- ZIP code: 83857
- Area codes: 208, 986
- GNIS feature ID: 2585582

Princeton is a census-designated place in Latah County, Idaho, United States. As of the 2020 census, Princeton had a population of 193.

== Description ==
Princeton is located on Idaho State Highway 6 3 miles (4.8 km) east-southeast of Potlatch. Princeton has a post office with ZIP code 83857. As of the 2010 census, its population was 148.

== History ==
A post office called Princeton has been in operation since 1894. The community was named after Princeton, Minnesota, the native home of an early settler.

== See also ==
- List of census-designated places in Idaho
