= Roderick Asher =

American geologist and mining engineer (1931-1997)

Roderick R. Asher (1931-1997) was an American geologist and mining engineer, best known for his field work in Mexico, Alaska, and the Great Basin region of the United States as well as his published works.

== Early life and education ==
Roderick Asher was born in a road camp in Potlatch, Idaho, on May 7, 1931. He was the son of James F. Asher, a surveyor, and Mabel Roland, a homemaker. He grew up on Indian reservations in Idaho, Utah and Montana, where his father constructed roads for the federal government. He attended tribal schools and graduated from Dixon High School on the Flathead Indian Reservation in western Montana. He spent parts of the year on his grandparents' ranch near Spray, Oregon, which was primitive and had no indoor plumbing or electricity. He served in combat during the Korean War as an Army medic. He attended the University of Idaho and earned a B.S. in Geology in 1957 and a M.S. in Geology in 1968. He married Shirley Ferren, a photographer, on June 26, 1955.

== Career ==
Roderick Asher began his career in Republic, Washington, working underground in a gold mine. After working briefly as a geologist in Tucson, Arizona, he was employed by the Cerro de Pasco silver mines in Peru, where he worked from 1959 to 1962. After a brief stint as a mine surveyor in Grants, New Mexico, he was employed as a geologist for the Idaho Bureau of Mines, where he worked until 1967, living in Moscow and doing fieldwork and mineral surveys in remote Owyhee County in southwestern Idaho. His “Geology and Mineral Resources of a Portion of the Silver City Region, Owyhee County, Idaho” helped drive efforts to re-establish silver mining in the Delamar, Idaho area.

In 1967, he moved to Alaska, where he attained the position of chief geologist for the Alaska Bureau of Mines, Division of Mines and Geology in Fairbanks. He worked and camped in remote regions of western Alaska on the Seward Peninsula and in the 40-Mile Region near the Canadian border, conducting mineral evaluations for the state which he went on to publish.

In 1970, he left Alaska for Chihuahua, Mexico, where he worked for NL Industries as an exploration geologist, evaluating precious metal resources for the company in many remote regions of the Sierra Madres, often in areas only accessible by mule. In 1973, he moved to Golden, Colorado. Although based in Colorado, most of his work was in Mexico and South America for FMC Corporation and Tenneco. He also managed several mining exploration projects in Nevada and southern Idaho.

In 1984, he moved to Reno, Nevada, working as a geologist for Echo Bay, Pegasus Gold, Atlas, and Meridian Gold. He was active in the American Institute of Professional Geologists. He launched a consulting business in 1996.

=== Death and legacy ===
Roderick Asher was killed in a single vehicle accident on Interstate 80 on August 20, 1997 near Battle Mountain, Nevada, en route to a project near Ely while working as a consultant. His children include Bradley Asher (an independent scholar specializing in American history), James Asher (an educational administrator in Wisconsin), nd Curtis Asher (Dean of Libraries at California State University, Bakersfield). A scholarship for aspiring field geologists in Roderick Asher's name was established at the University of Idaho. His papers are held at the University of Wyoming, American Heritage Center.

== Selected publications ==
- Roderick R. Asher, Geology and Mineral Resources of a Portion of the Silver City Region, Owyhee County, Idaho (Pamphlet 138: Idaho Bureau of Mines and Geology, 1968).
- Roderick R. Asher, Volcanic Construction Materials in Idaho (Pamphlet 135: Idaho Bureau of Mines and Geology, 1965).
- Roderick R. Asher, Geological and Geochemical Study, Solomon C-5 quadrangle, Seward Peninsula, Alaska (Alaska Division of Mines and Geology, report no. 33, 1969)
- Roderick R. Asher, Geology and Geochemistry of the Belt Creek-Libby River area, Seward Peninsula, Alaska (Alaska Division of Mines and Geology, report no. 22, 1970)
- Roderick R. Asher, Geochemistry and geology, Boundary area, Fortymile District, Eagle A-1 quadrangle, Alaska (Alaska Division of Mines and Geology, Geochemical report no. 23, 1970)
