= Moscow School District =

School district in Idaho, United States

Moscow School District #281

Address
- 650 N. Cleveland Street Moscow, Idaho, 83843; United States

District information
- Type: Public
- Motto: Pride of the North
- Grades: K–12
- Superintendent: Shawn Tiegs
- Budget: $26 million

Students and staff
- Students: 2,388 (fall 2016)
- Staff: 300
- Athletic conference: Inland Empire League (Class 4A)
- Colors: Black & Red

Other information
- Website: www.msd281.org

The Moscow School District #281 is a public school district located in Moscow, Latah County, Idaho. It has three elementary schools, one middle school, one high school, and one alternative high school.

The district includes Moscow and Viola.

== Reconfiguration ==
During the summer of 2012, the district reconfigured from a 6–3–3 format to 5–3–4; the ninth grade was moved out of the junior high, which was converted to a middle school (grades 6–8). After 46 years as a three-grade senior high school, Moscow High School returned to a four-grade campus in August with the addition of freshman (class of 2016).

MHS was originally four years until September 1966, when the freshmen (class of 1970) in the district stayed for a third year at the newly expanded junior high, which had opened in 1959 with two grades.

Additionally, Russell Elementary School was closed in 2024, expanding West Park Elementary to K-5 instead of K-2 with Russell taking 3-5 like the previous years.

== Boundaries ==
The district's attendance boundary includes student housing facilities of the University of Idaho that have university students with dependent children, including South Hill Apartments and South Hill Vista Apartments.

The district (#281) extends beyond the Moscow city limits and is bounded by four other school districts: Pullman to the west at the state line, Potlatch School District #285 to the north, Troy School District #287 to east, and Genesee School District #282 to the south. Pullman has a similar enrollment, while the combined enrollment of the other three districts is about half of Moscow's.

== Proposed new high school ==
A $29 million bond levy election was brought before the voters in April 2005, with $20 million to fund a proposed new high school campus on the northeast edge of the city (46.744°N 116.969°W). Three quarters of the 40-acre (16 ha) site, adjacent to Mountain View Park, was to be donated by a Moscow family. The levy needed a two-thirds majority to pass, but was soundly defeated, with only 44% in favor.

The current high school opened in 1939 on a 4-acre (1.6 ha) site, and a single-floor annex was added in 1968, west of the auditorium. The addition of a second floor to the annex was proposed in the late 1980s, but the soil under its foundation was found to be unsuitable. A second annex, a two-floor wing, was added on the south side of campus in 1991, west of the gymnasium. With limited space on campus, the varsity athletic facilities are located at Moscow Middle School (46.739°N 116.982°W).

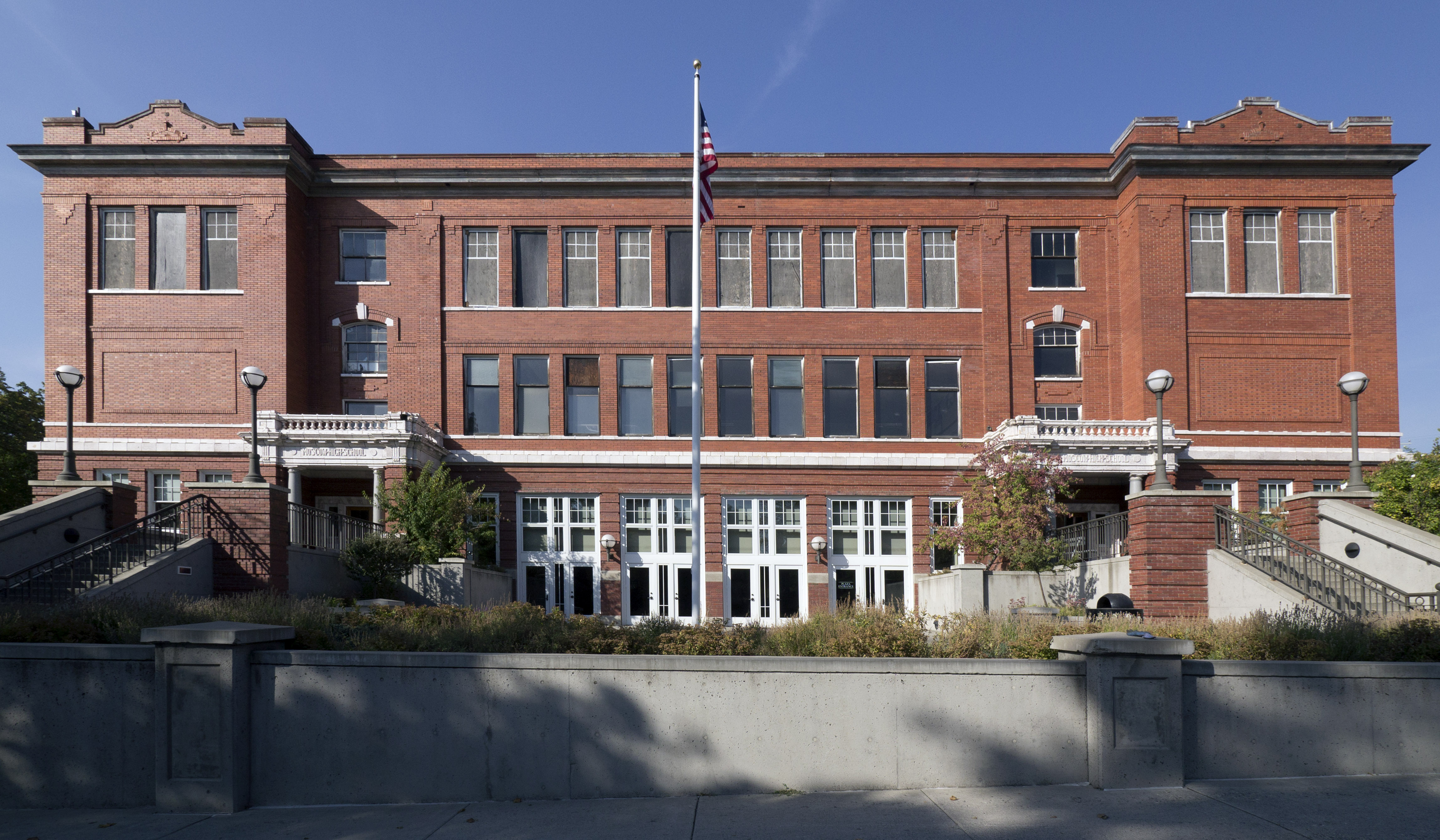
1912 Center in 2012; MHS until 1939

Prior to 1939, the high school was housed in the 1912 building to the north, across Third Street. The first high school of 1892 was on the present campus, southwest of Third & Adams streets, and was razed in 1939. Both of the former high schools were later known as "Whitworth." The 1912 building was used as the district's junior high for twenty years, until the present middle school opened in 1959. The school district used the 1912 building for administration offices until its new building was completed in 1996, north of the middle school. The 1912 building was sold to the city in 1998 and is now the "1912 Center."

== Schools ==
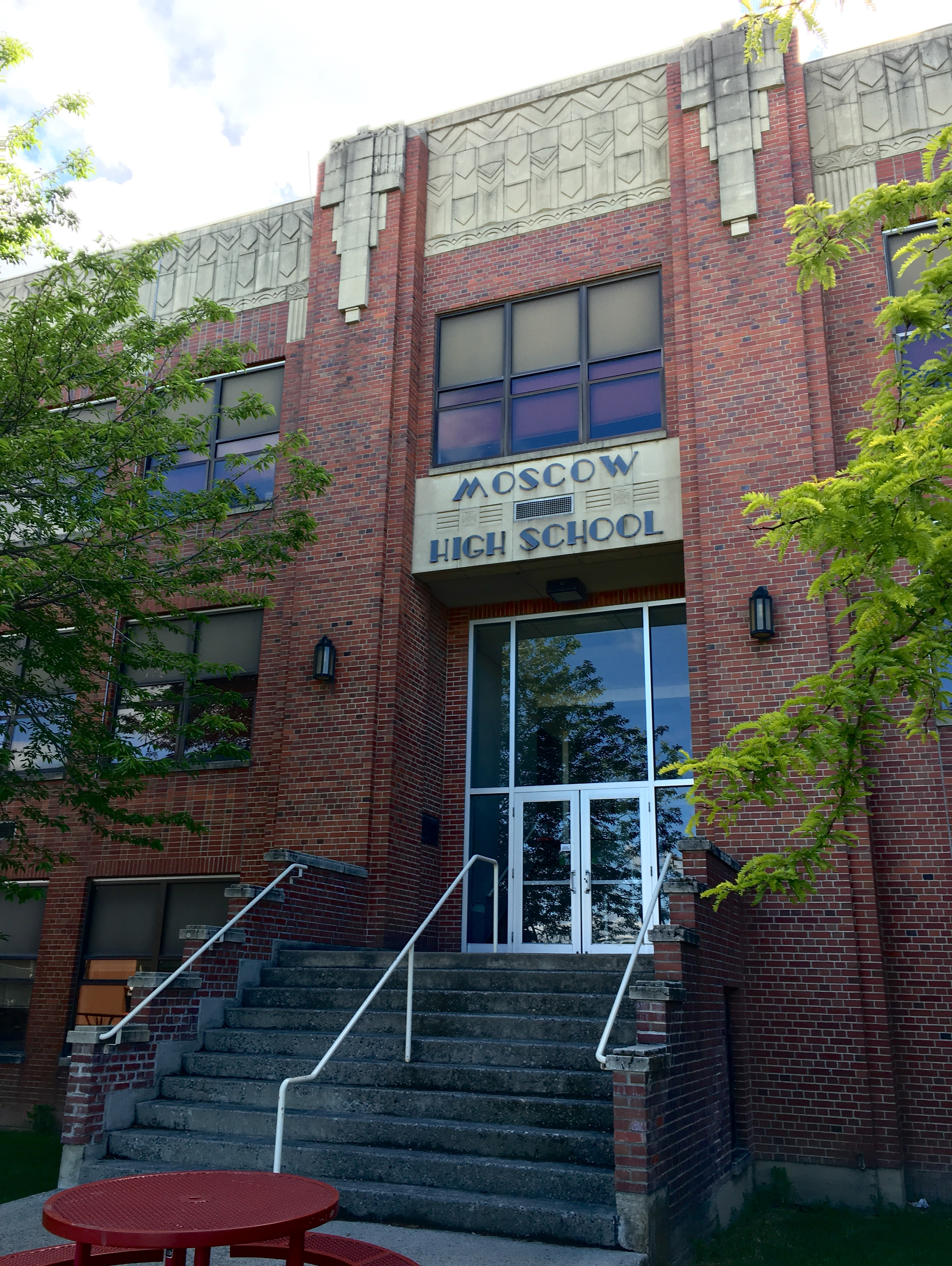
Moscow High School

High schools

- Moscow High School (9–12)
- Paradise Creek Regional High School (Alternative, 10–12)

Middle school

- Moscow Middle School (6–8)

Elementary schools

- A.B. McDonald Elementary School (K–5)
- West Park Elementary School (K–5)
- Lena Whitmore Elementary School (K–5)
