= Jane Goude =

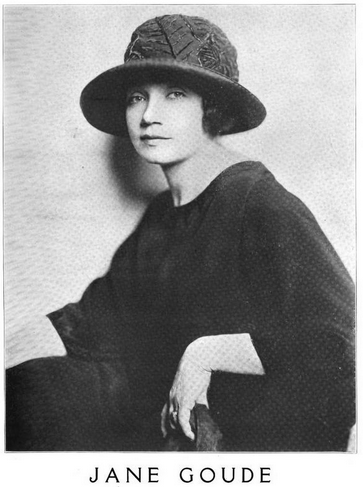
- Jane Goude, from a 1922 publication.
- Born: Genevieve Hazel Goude; November 4, 1891; Potlatch, Idaho
- Died: August 7, 1966 (aged 74)
- Occupation: Actor

Jane Goude (November 4, 1891 — August 7, 1966), born Genevieve Hazel Goude, was an American actress, Chautauqua performer, and clubwoman, billed as "The Girl from the Golden West".

== Early life ==
Genevieve Hazel Goude was born in Potlatch, Idaho, the daughter of Frank Elliott Goude and Carrie Jenkins Goude. She was raised by her Jenkins grandparents near Spokane, Washington after her mother died in 1892. By the time she was 17 years old, both her grandparents had also died, and she sewed to support herself, while studying at the Walton College of Expression in Spokane.

== Career ==
In the 1920s Goude toured nationally as "The Girl from the Golden West", giving dramatic readings and impersonations on the Chautauqua and lyceum circuits. In the 1930s she was based in Chicago, and traveled for the Redpath Lyceum Bureau as "special campaign director", working with local Chautauqua committees to book speakers and performers. She was director of the Cooperative Concert Association's national membership campaign, represented the Columbia Concerts Corporation, and spoke to civic groups around the United States.

By 1939 she was based in Los Angeles, and active in women's clubs there. Goudie had small roles in the films East Side of Heaven (1939) with Bing Crosby, That's Right—You're Wrong (1939) with Kay Kyser, The Doctor Takes a Wife (1940) with Loretta Young, Third Finger, Left Hand (1940) with Myrna Loy, Jackass Mail (1942) with Wallace Beery, and Orchestra Wives (1942) with Glenn Miller.

== Personal life ==
Goude died in Los Angeles, California in 1966, aged 74 years.
