= Avon, Idaho =

Unincorporated community in Idaho, United States

Coordinates: 46°49′34″N 116°36′50″W

Avon is an unincorporated community in Latah County, in the U.S. state of Idaho.

== History ==
A post office operated under the name Avon from 1891 until 1953. However, the community Avon moved to its current location in 1907 when a new railroad line missed the original townsite.

Avon's population was estimated at 100 in 1909.
