= Hoodoo Mountains =

Idaho mountain range

Coordinates: 47.03°N 116.49°W

Location in the United States
Location in Idaho

The Hoodoo Mountains are a mountain range in the northwest United States, in north central Idaho. They are part of the Clearwater Mountains and are the source of the Potlatch and Palouse rivers. Located in northeastern Latah County and southeastern Benewah County, the high point is Bald Mountain at 5,334 feet (1,626 m) above sea level. On the west slope of the northern Rocky Mountains, the Hoodoos transition into the adjoining Palouse region, to the southwest.

North–South Ski Bowl, a former alpine ski area, is in the north end of the range in Benewah County. Opened in the 1930s, the area was originally owned and operated by Washington State College (now Washington State University) in Pullman. Alpine operations were discontinued in the 1990s and it is now a "park'n'ski" area for cross-country skiing off State Highway 6.
