= Idaho State Highway 6 =

State highway in Idaho, United States

State Highway 6
- SH-6 highlighted in red

Route information
- Maintained by ITD
- Length: 40.645 mi (65.412 km)

Major junctions
- South end: SR 272 at Washington state line near Potlatch
- US 95 near Potlatch; SH-9 near Harvard
- North end: SH-3 near Santa

Location
- Country: United States
- State: Idaho
- Counties: Latah, Benewah

Highway system
- Idaho State Highway System; Interstate; US; State
← SH-5	→ SH-7

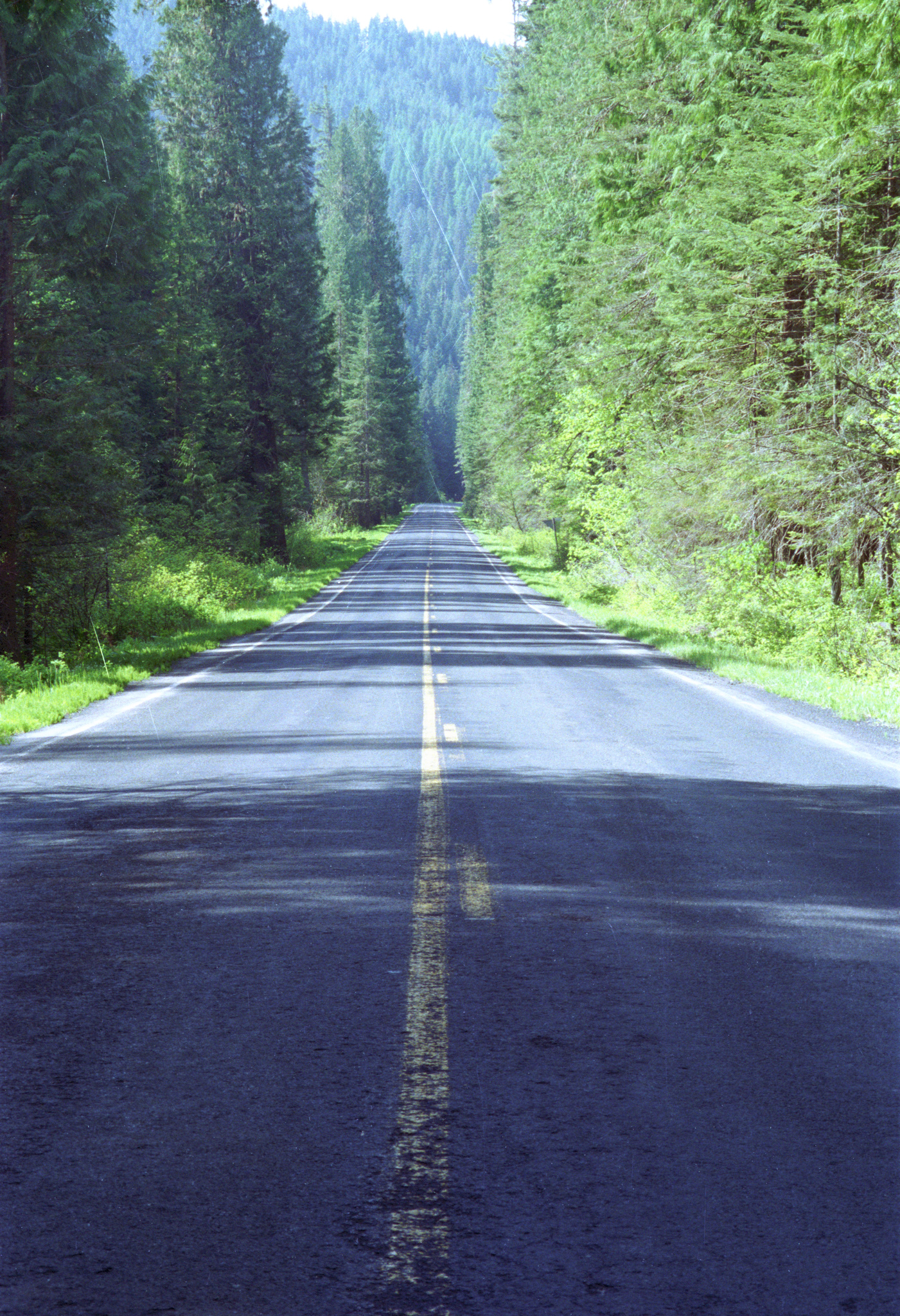
State Highway 6 (SH-6)

State Highway 6 (SH-6) is a state highway in northern Idaho running from the Washington state line near Potlatch to Santa. It is 40.645 miles (65.41 km) in length and generally runs southwest to northeast

== Route description ==
SH-6 begins at the Washington state line in Latah County as a continuation of Washington State Route 272, then heads east to an intersection with U.S. 95, with which it briefly overlaps before diverging and continuing east into Potlatch. It continues east to an intersection with SH-9 near Harvard.

SH-6 continues northeast and north across the Palouse River into Benewah County, generally north through White Pine Drive; and area of old-growth white pine trees in the Hoodoo Mountains in the St. Joe National Forest. It terminates at a junction with SH-3, west of Santa.

Between Harvard and Emida, the route crests at an elevation of about 3,600 feet (1,095 m) above sea level. This is a park 'n' ski lot (Palouse Divide) for cross-country skiing, and the turnoff to North–South Ski Bowl, a defunct alpine area which is now a private conference and retreat lodge.

Prior to the 1960s, SH-6 was signed as an alternate route of U.S. 95, which continued north along present-day SH-3.

== Major intersections ==
County	Location	mi	km	Destinations	Notes
Latah		0.000	0.000	SR 272 west – Palouse	Continuation into Washington
Latah		4.420	7.113	US 95 south – Lewiston	South end of US-95 overlap
Latah		5.590	8.996	US 95 north – Plummer, Coeur d'Alene	North end of US-95 overlap
Latah		15.448	24.861	SH-9 south – Deary	
Benewah		40.645	65.412	SH-3 – St. Maries, Coeur d'Alene, Clarkia	
1.000 mi = 1.609 km; 1.000 km = 0.621 mi: Concurrency terminus

== See also ==
- List of state highways in Idaho
- List of highways numbered 6
