= Stanford, Idaho =

Unincorporated community in Idaho, United States

Coordinates: 46°49′58″N 116°38′41″W

Stanford is an unincorporated community in Latah County, in the U.S. state of Idaho.

The community was probably named for Inman A. Stanford, an early settler.
