= Deary, Idaho =

- City
- Location of Deary in Latah County, Idaho

- Location of Deary in Idaho Deary, Idaho (the United States)
- Coordinates: 46°48′01″N 116°33′25″W
- Country: United States
- State: Idaho
- County: Latah

Area
  - Total: 0.66 sq mi (1.71 km^{2})
  - Land: 0.66 sq mi (1.70 km^{2})
  - Water: 0 sq mi (0.00 km^{2})
- Elevation: 2,871 ft (875 m)

Population (2020)
  - Total: 508
  - Density: 784.8/sq mi (303.01/km^{2})
- Time zone: UTC-8 (Pacific (PST))
  - Summer (DST): UTC-7 (PDT)
- ZIP code: 83823
- Area code: 208
- FIPS code: 16-20890
- GNIS feature ID: 2410306
- Website: www.dearyidaho.com

Deary is a city in Latah County, Idaho. As of the 2020 census, Deary had a population of 508. It is located 24 miles (39 km) east of Moscow and 43 miles (69 km) northeast of Lewiston.

== History ==
The settlement began as a waystation on the road to the forests at Bovill, Idaho. Owned by two African-Americans, Joe and Lou Wells, the waystation location was first called "Spud Hill", and then "Anderson".

The settlement was renamed "Deary" when the railroad was extended to that point. The town was founded in 1907, and named for William Deary, a businessperson in the lumber industry. A post office has been in operation at Deary since 1907.

== Geography ==
Deary is located at the base of Potato Hill, or as the locals call it, "Spud Hill" and close to outdoor recreation, including camping and fishing: between Spring Valley Reservoir and Moose Creek.

According to the United States Census Bureau, the city has a total area of 0.65 square miles (1.68 km^{2}), all of it land.

== Demographics ==
Historical population
Census	Pop.	Note	%±
1920	316		—
1930	295		−6.6%
1940	320		8.5%
1950	320		0.0%
1960	349		9.1%
1970	411		17.8%
1980	539		31.1%
1990	529		−1.9%
2000	552		4.3%
2010	506		−8.3%
2020	508		0.4%
2019 (est.)	516		2.0%
U.S. Decennial Census

=== 2010 census ===
As of the census of 2010, there were 506 people, 204 households, and 143 families residing in the city. The population density was 778.5 inhabitants per square mile (300.6/km^{2}). There were 221 housing units at an average density of 340.0 per square mile (131.3/km^{2}). The racial makeup of the city was 93.5% White, 0.2% African American, 1.0% Native American, 0.8% Asian, 0.8% from other races, and 3.8% from two or more races. Hispanic or Latino of any race were 2.2% of the population.

There were 204 households, of which 33.3% had children under the age of 18 living with them, 57.8% were married couples living together, 7.4% had a female householder with no husband present, 4.9% had a male householder with no wife present, and 29.9% were non-families. 21.6% of all households were made up of individuals, and 9.3% had someone living alone who was 65 years of age or older. The average household size was 2.48 and the average family size was 2.94.

The median age in the city was 39.3 years. 24.5% of residents were under the age of 18; 5.7% were between the ages of 18 and 24; 26% were from 25 to 44; 30% were from 45 to 64; and 13.6% were 65 years of age or older. The gender makeup of the city was 52.4% male and 47.6% female.

=== 2000 census ===
As of the census of 2000, there were 552 people, 214 households, and 156 families residing in the city. The population density was 921.6 inhabitants per square mile (355.8/km^{2}). There were 235 housing units at an average density of 392.4 per square mile (151.5/km^{2}). The racial makeup of the city was 96.20% White, 0.18% Native American, 0.54% Asian, 0.72% from other races, and 2.36% from two or more races. Hispanic or Latino of any race were 3.44% of the population.

There were 214 households, out of which 33.2% had children under the age of 18 living with them, 62.1% were married couples living together, 5.1% had a female householder with no husband present, and 27.1% were non-families. 21.0% of all households were made up of individuals, and 5.6% had someone living alone who was 65 years of age or older. The average household size was 2.58 and the average family size was 2.97.

In the city, the population was spread out, with 26.4% under the age of 18, 10.1% from 18 to 24, 27.2% from 25 to 44, 23.0% from 45 to 64, and 13.2% who were 65 years of age or older. The median age was 36 years. For every 100 females, there were 97.1 males. For every 100 females age 18 and over, there were 102.0 males.

The median income for a household in the city was $36,167, and the median income for a family was $40,750. Males had a median income of $31,875 versus $19,688 for females. The per capita income for the city was $16,244. About 7.3% of families and 8.7% of the population were below the poverty line, including 15.6% of those under age 18 and 5.6% of those age 65 or over.

== Education ==
Deary has one school, Deary Junior-Senior High School.

== See also ==
- List of cities in Idaho
