= Helmer, Idaho =

Unincorporated community in Idaho, United States

- Unincorporated community
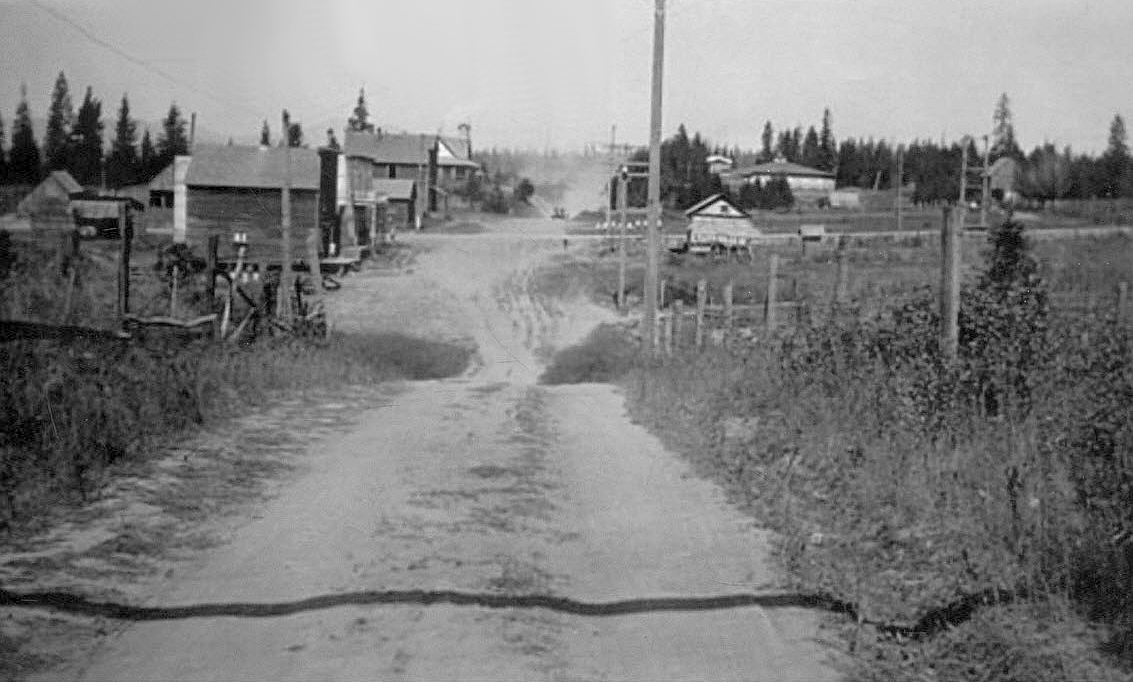
- Helmer, circa 1910

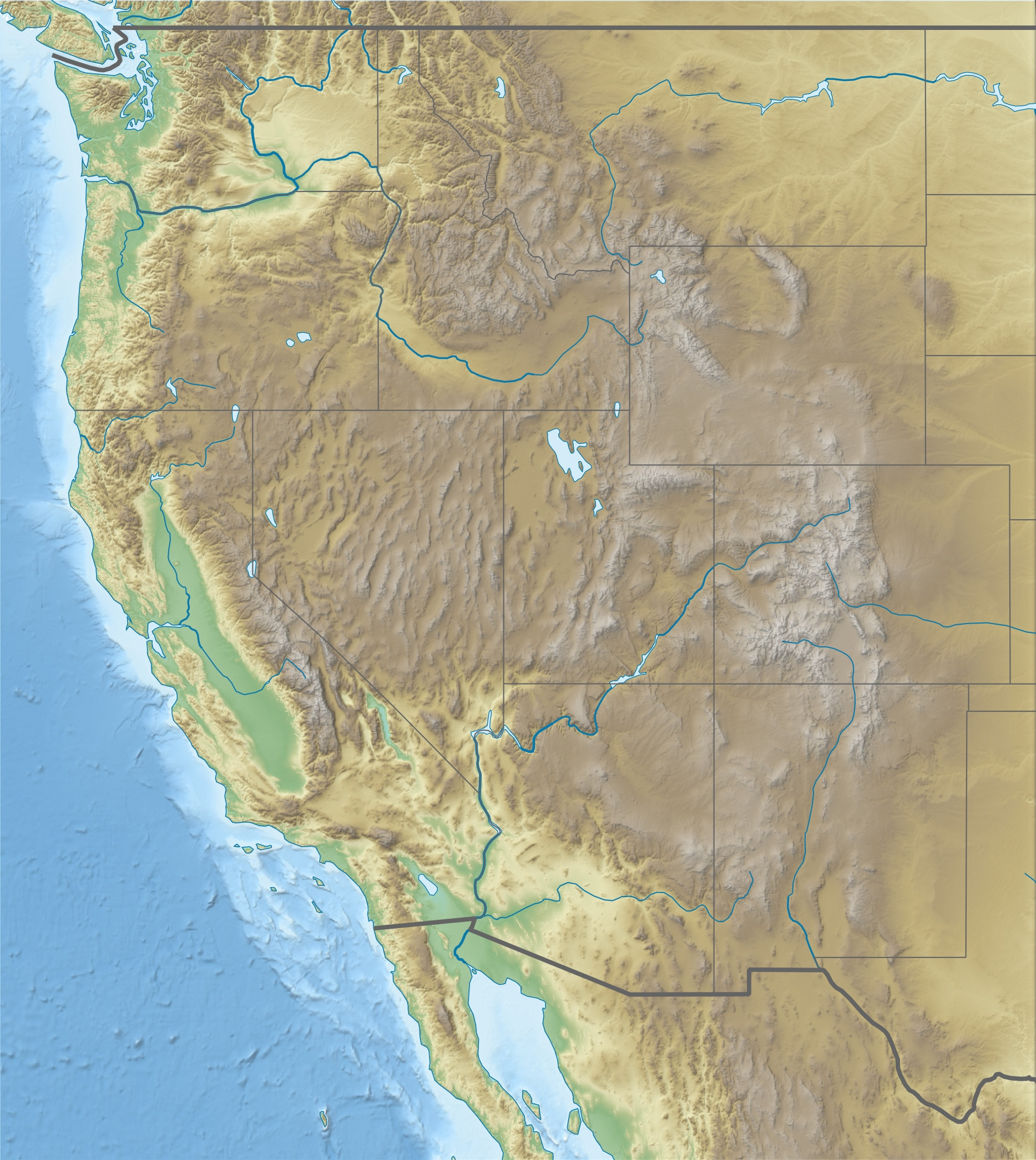
- Location within Idaho Location within USA West
- Coordinates: 46°48′03″N 116°28′13″W
- Country: United States
- State: Idaho
- County: Latah
- Elevation: 2,835 ft (864 m)
- Time zone: UTC-8 (Pacific (PST))
  - Summer (DST): UTC-7 (PDT)
- Area codes: 208, 986
- GNIS feature ID: 396643

Helmer is an unincorporated community in Latah County, Idaho, United States.

== History ==
Helmer was founded when the railroad was extended to that point. A post office was established at Helmer in 1907, and remained in operation until 1929.

Helmer's population was estimated at 50 in 1909, and was 30 in 1960.
