= Potlatch, Idaho =

- City
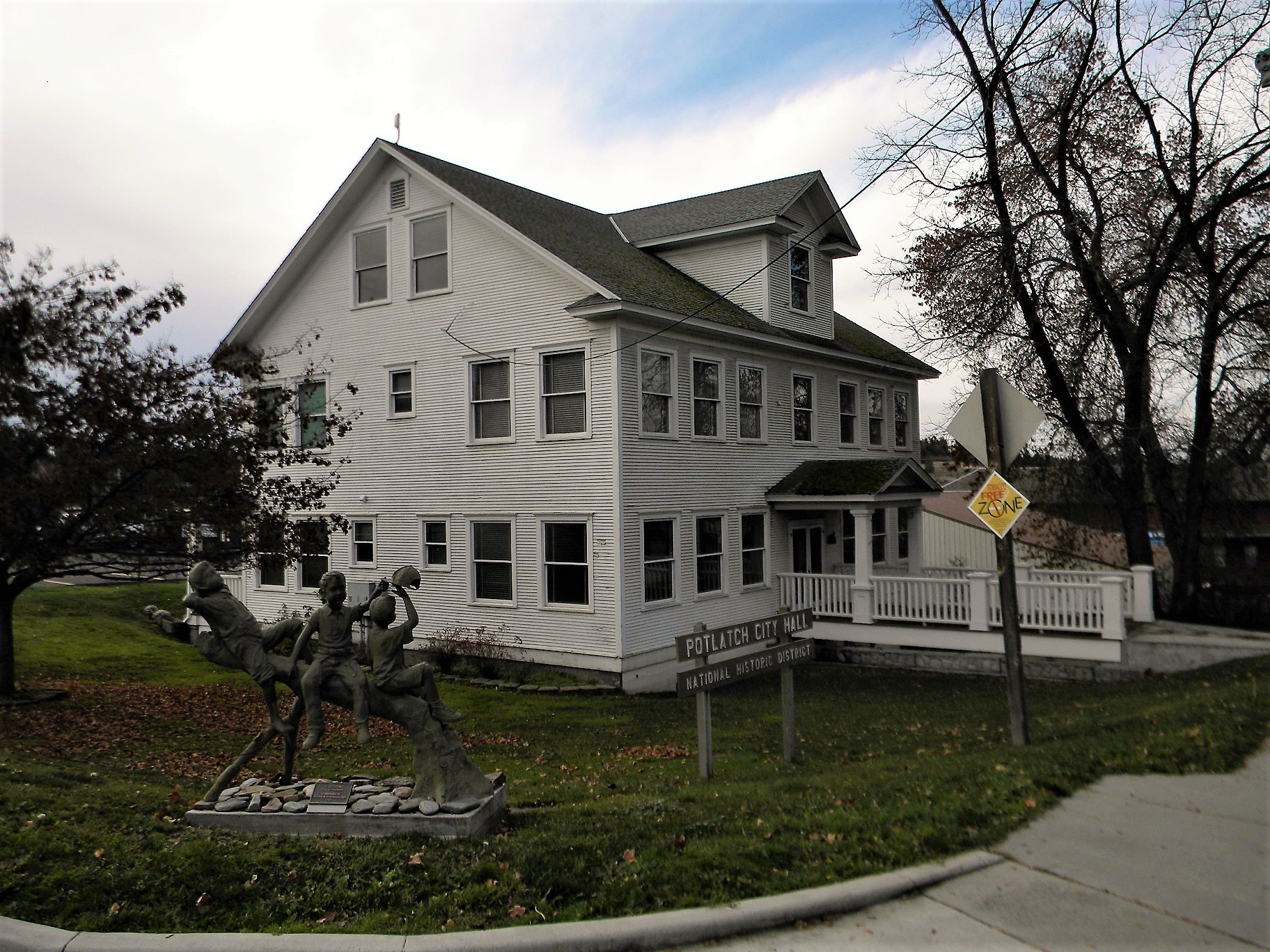
- Potlatch City Hall

- Location of Potlatch in Latah County, Idaho.
- Coordinates: 46°55′24″N 116°53′54″W
- Country: United States
- State: Idaho
- County: Latah

Area
  - Total: 0.42 sq mi (1.10 km^{2})
  - Land: 0.42 sq mi (1.10 km^{2})
  - Water: 0 sq mi (0.00 km^{2})
- Elevation: 2,572 ft (784 m)

Population (2020)
  - Total: 763
  - Density: 1,923/sq mi (742.4/km^{2})
- Time zone: UTC-8 (Pacific (PST))
  - Summer (DST): UTC-7 (PDT)
- ZIP code: 83855
- Area code: 208
- FIPS code: 16-64900
- GNIS feature ID: 2411478
- Website: www.cityofpotlatch.org

Potlatch is a city in the northwest United States, located in north central Idaho in Latah County, about six miles (10 km) east of the border with Washington. On the Palouse north of Moscow, it is served by State Highway 6, and bordered on the northeast by the small community of Onaway. As of the 2020 census, Potlatch had a population of 763.

== History ==
=== Company town ===
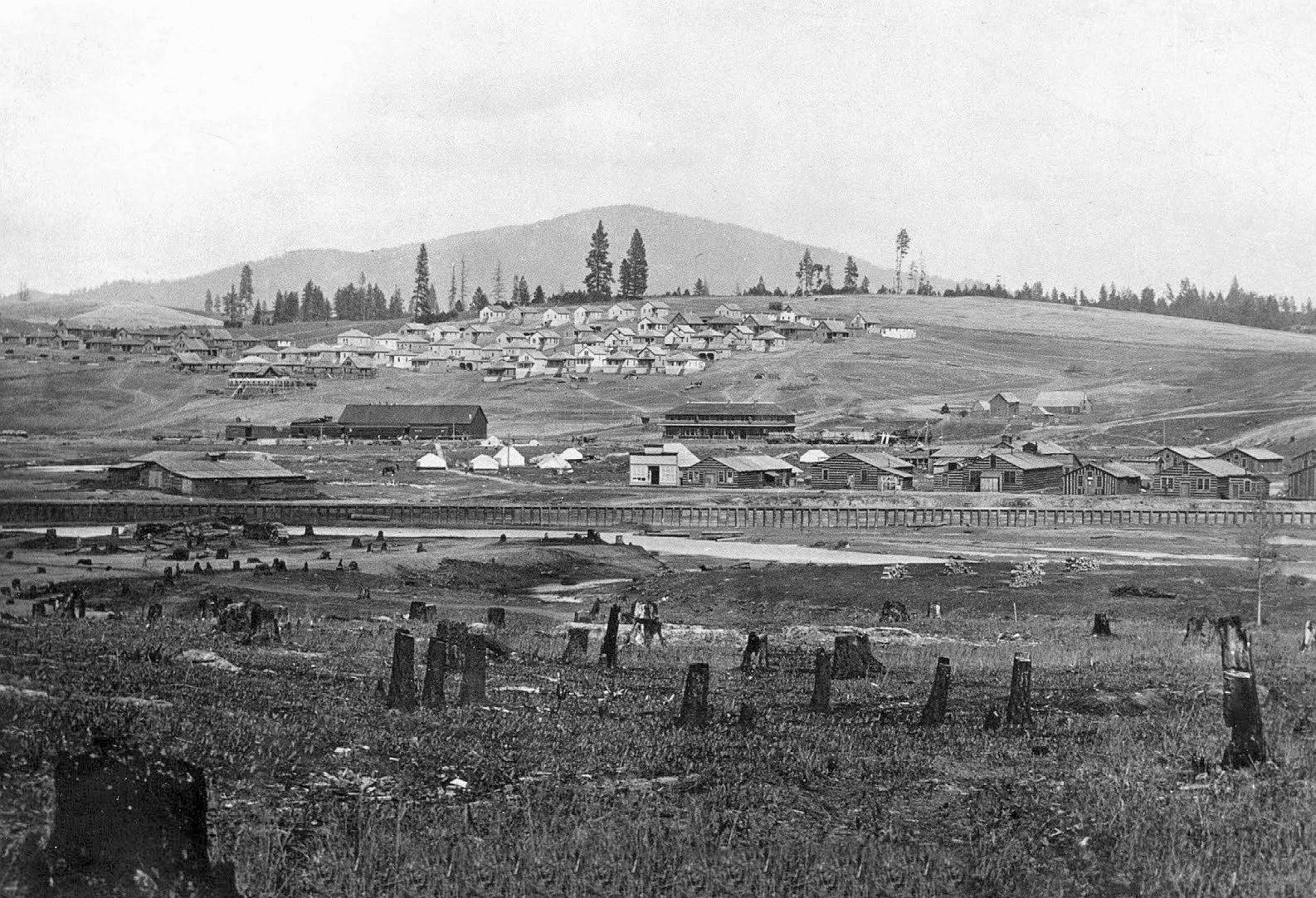
Potlatch (1906)

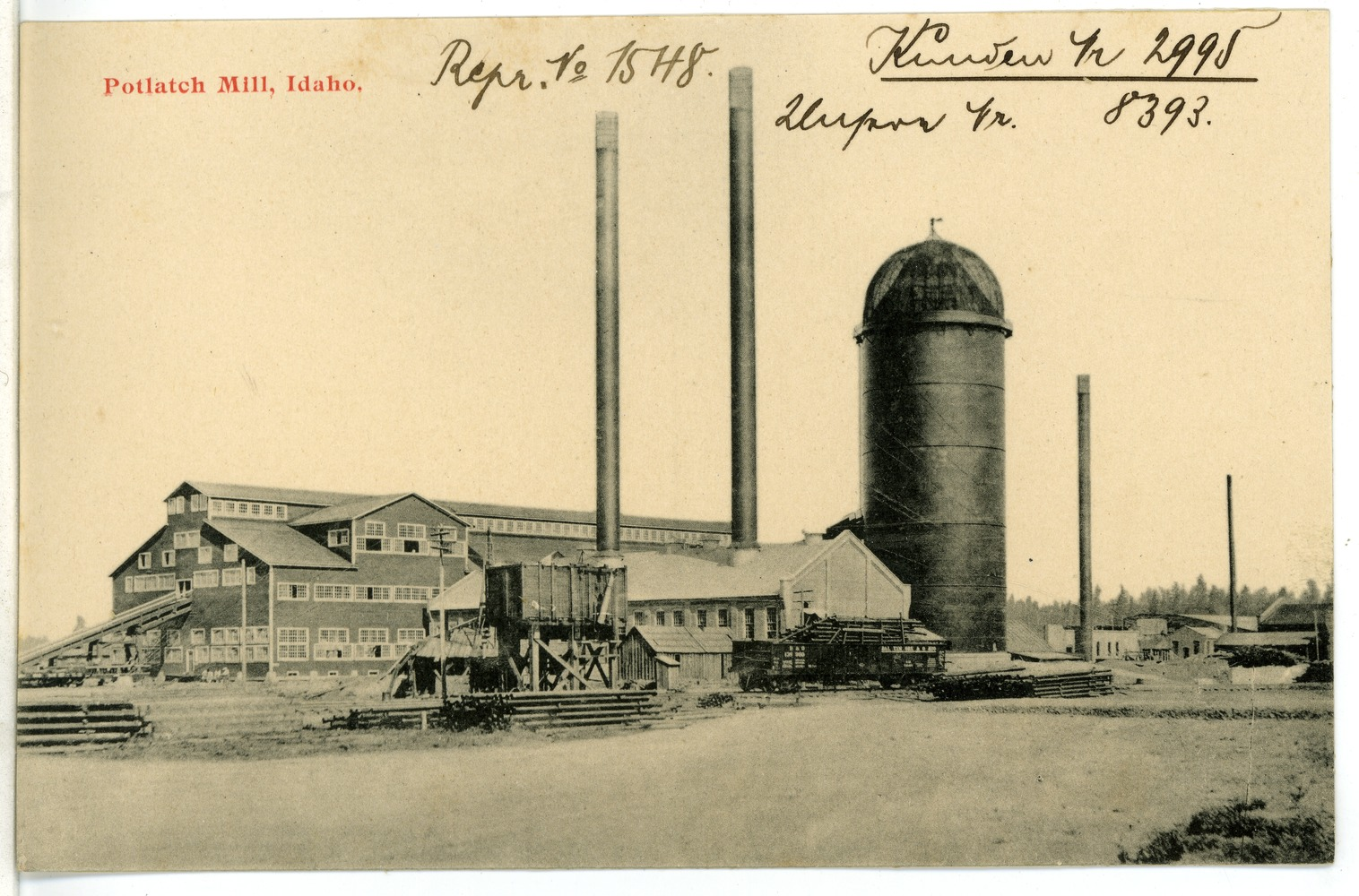
Potlatch Mill (1906)

In 1903, Frederick Weyerhaeuser incorporated the Potlatch Lumber Company (eventually becoming the Potlatch Corporation), naming his son Charles as the President. The directors of the company selected Canadian lumberman William Deary to build a mill somewhere within the company's timber holdings. The townsite was chosen because of proximity to the company's large holdings of Western White Pine on the Palouse River. Potlatch was chosen as the mill site, and in 1904, crews working under W.A. Wilkinson of Minnesota began constructing what would be the largest white pine sawmill in the world.

Because of the remote placement of the mill, Potlatch was built as a company town to provide housing and commerce for the mill. A total of 143 houses were built in 1906, with 58 more built the following year; other building constructed during that period include boarding houses, an ice house, a Catholic church, hotel, school, and general store.

The company developed and ran Potlatch on a model mostly patterned after that used by Pullman Company for its company town in Illinois. It provide police and fire protection, a school, churches, a hospital, an inexpensive company store, and recreational amenities. It banned prostitution, prohibited alcohol, and encouraged its workers to marry by allowing only married couples to rent the houses it owned. The paternalism was profitable, even though rents were low: during 1943 the company showed a profit of $59,000 for its "townsite" services. Less than a decade later, with labor costs significantly reducing its townsite profit, the mill sold most of the homes and other buildings it owned, and Potlatch was incorporated.

On the west side of town, the mill began operating on September 11, 1906, and continued for over seven decades. Due to a depressed economy and declining lumber prices, the mill closed in August 1981.

=== Following the mill's closure ===
In 1981, the mill was shut down, shortly after the town was sold to the residents. Five years later, part of the commercial district was listed on the National Register of Historic Places.

After the mill's closure, Potlatch became a bedroom community for the university towns of Moscow and Pullman, Washington.

Business and political leaders of Potlatch are making a concerted effort to attract companies involved in the firearms industry; they have set aside 26 acres (11 ha) for such businesses, located on the former site of the mill. Approximately a mile (1.6 km) west of the mill, State Highway 6 connects with U.S. Route 95, Idaho's primary north-south highway.

== Geography ==
According to the United States Census Bureau, the city has a total area of 0.43 square miles (1.11 km^{2}), all of it land. Potlatch is north of the confluence of Rock Creek and the Palouse River, on the edge of the Palouse ecoregion.

== Climate ==
Potlatch has a dry-summer humid continental climate (Dsb) according to the Köppen climate classification system.

Climate data for Potlatch, Idaho (1991–2020 normals, extremes 1915–present)
Month	Jan	Feb	Mar	Apr	May	Jun	Jul	Aug	Sep	Oct	Nov	Dec	Year
Record high °F (°C)	62 (17)	65 (18)	75 (24)	90 (32)	95 (35)	107 (42)	104 (40)	110 (43)	104 (40)	90 (32)	71 (22)	65 (18)	110 (43)
Mean daily maximum °F (°C)	37.3 (2.9)	41.0 (5.0)	48.0 (8.9)	55.9 (13.3)	65.2 (18.4)	70.6 (21.4)	82.0 (27.8)	83.7 (28.7)	74.1 (23.4)	59.0 (15.0)	44.3 (6.8)	36.2 (2.3)	58.1 (14.5)
Daily mean °F (°C)	31.4 (−0.3)	33.6 (0.9)	38.9 (3.8)	44.9 (7.2)	52.5 (11.4)	57.8 (14.3)	65.4 (18.6)	65.8 (18.8)	57.9 (14.4)	46.8 (8.2)	37.1 (2.8)	30.6 (−0.8)	46.9 (8.3)
Mean daily minimum °F (°C)	25.5 (−3.6)	26.1 (−3.3)	29.8 (−1.2)	33.8 (1.0)	39.9 (4.4)	45.0 (7.2)	48.9 (9.4)	47.8 (8.8)	41.6 (5.3)	34.6 (1.4)	29.9 (−1.2)	25.0 (−3.9)	35.7 (2.1)
Record low °F (°C)	−30 (−34)	−27 (−33)	−13 (−25)	15 (−9)	18 (−8)	25 (−4)	27 (−3)	25 (−4)	14 (−10)	9 (−13)	−16 (−27)	−29 (−34)	−30 (−34)
Average precipitation inches (mm)	2.76 (70)	2.08 (53)	2.80 (71)	2.33 (59)	2.48 (63)	1.60 (41)	0.84 (21)	0.75 (19)	0.95 (24)	2.16 (55)	2.85 (72)	2.90 (74)	24.50 (622)
Average snowfall inches (cm)	13.1 (33)	7.6 (19)	3.1 (7.9)	1.3 (3.3)	0.2 (0.51)	0.0 (0.0)	0.0 (0.0)	0.0 (0.0)	0.0 (0.0)	0.2 (0.51)	5.2 (13)	10.6 (27)	41.3 (105)
Average precipitation days (≥ 0.01 in)	10.4	9.1	10.4	9.4	8.4	7.0	3.5	2.7	4.1	8.0	10.5	9.5	93.0
Average snowy days (≥ 0.1 in)	4.9	3.2	1.9	0.4	0.1	0.0	0.0	0.0	0.0	0.1	1.9	4.0	16.5
Source: NOAA

== Demographics ==
In August 1906 the town had a population of about 1,000; and a year later, it reached around 1,500.

Historical population
Census	Pop.	Note	%±
1910	750		—
1920	1,505		100.7%
1930	1,500		−0.3%
1940	1,409		−6.1%
1950	1,105		−21.6%
1960	880		−20.4%
1970	871		−1.0%
1980	819		−6.0%
1990	790		−3.5%
2000	791		0.1%
2010	804		1.6%
2020	763		−5.1%
U.S. Decennial Census

=== 2010 census ===
As of the census of 2010, there were 804 people, 339 households, and 218 families residing in the city. The population density was 1,869.8 inhabitants per square mile (721.9/km^{2}). There were 368 housing units at an average density of 855.8 per square mile (330.4/km^{2}). The racial makeup of the city was 97.1% White, 0.1% African American, 0.1% Native American, 0.2% from other races, and 2.4% from two or more races. Hispanic or Latino of any race were 2.1% of the population.

There were 339 households, of which 35.7% had children under the age of 18 living with them, 49.3% were married couples living together, 10.9% had a female householder with no husband present, 4.1% had a male householder with no wife present, and 35.7% were non-families. 28.9% of all households were made up of individuals, and 13.9% had someone living alone who was 65 years of age or older. The average household size was 2.37 and the average family size was 2.92.

The median age in the city was 32.9 years. 28.4% of residents were under the age of 18; 7% were between the ages of 18 and 24; 28.7% were from 25 to 44; 21% were from 45 to 64; and 14.8% were 65 years of age or older. The gender makeup of the city was 49.6% male and 50.4% female.

=== 2000 census ===
As of the census of 2000, there were 791 people, 332 households, and 222 families residing in the city. The population density was 2,355.7 inhabitants per square mile (909.5/km^{2}). There were 357 housing units at an average density of 1,063.2 per square mile (410.5/km^{2}). The racial makeup of the city was 96.59% White, 0.88% Native American, 0.25% Asian, 1.26% from other races, and 1.01% from two or more races. Hispanic or Latino of any race were 1.39% of the population.

There were 332 households, out of which 34.3% had children under the age of 18 living with them, 51.5% were married couples living together, 12.0% had a female householder with no husband present, and 33.1% were non-families. 28.6% of all households were made up of individuals, and 13.9% had someone living alone who was 65 years of age or older. The average household size was 2.38 and the average family size was 2.96.

In the city, the population was spread out, with 30.0% under the age of 18, 6.6% from 18 to 24, 27.4% from 25 to 44, 21.1% from 45 to 64, and 14.9% who were 65 years of age or older. The median age was 36 years. For every 100 females, there were 95.8 males. For every 100 females age 18 and over, there were 91.7 males.

The median income for a household in the city was $28,021, and the median income for a family was $35,385. Males had a median income of $30,833 versus $21,964 for females. The per capita income for the city was $14,449. About 11.1% of families and 15.4% of the population were below the poverty line, including 17.1% of those under age 18 and 11.4% of those age 65 or over.

== Notable people ==
- Roderick Asher - geologist
- Guyle Fielder - former NHL player
- Jane Goude - actress, born in Potlatch
- Malcolm Renfrew - chemist
- Pat Shea - former NHL player

== See also ==
- Washington, Idaho and Montana Railway
