= Latah County, Idaho =

County in Idaho, United States

- County
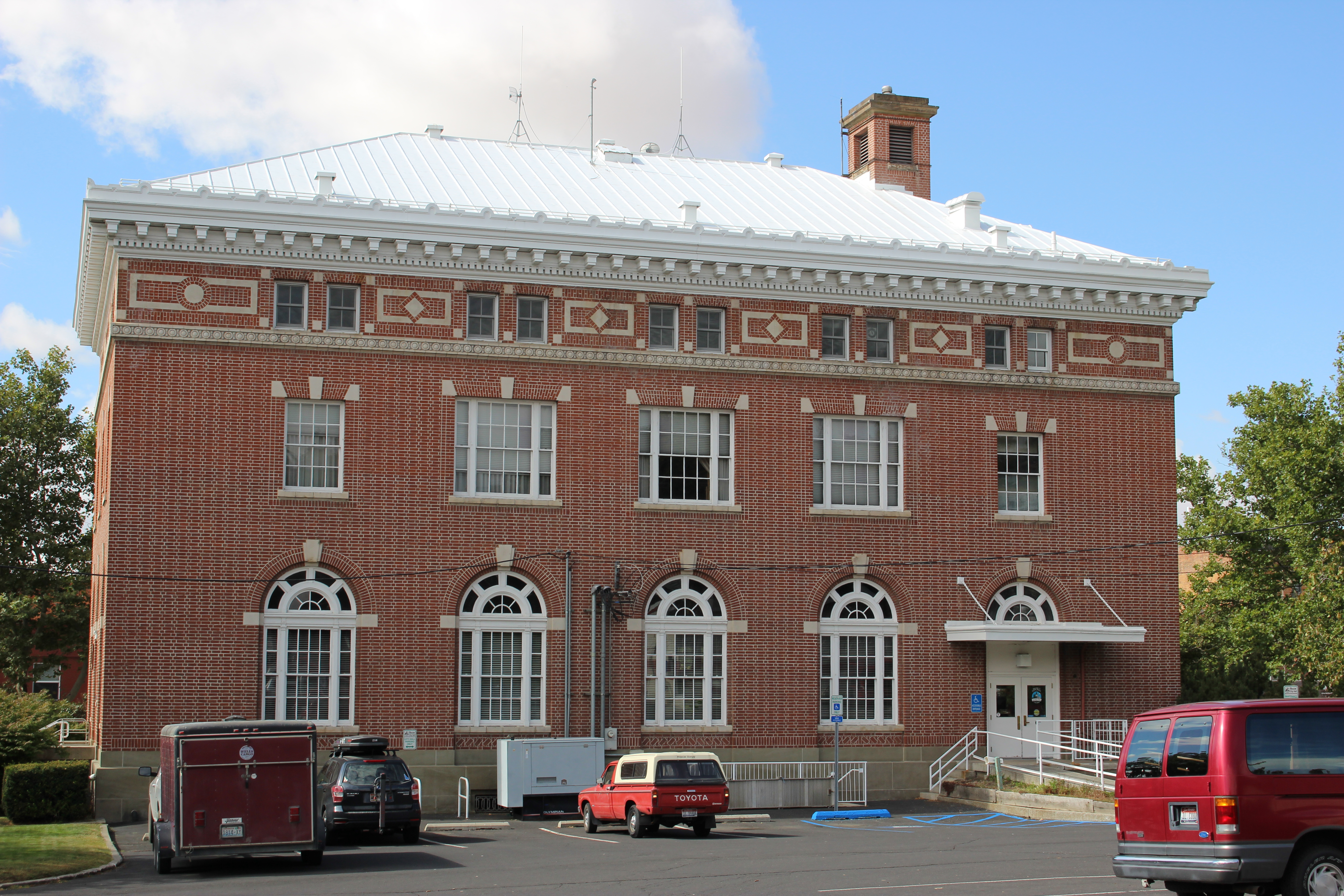
- Moscow Post Office and Courthouse

- Seal

- Location within the U.S. state of Idaho
- Coordinates: 46°50′24″N 116°40′36″W
- Country: United States
- State: Idaho
- Founded: May 14, 1888
- Named for: Latah Creek
- Seat: Moscow
- Largest city: Moscow

Area
  - Total: 1,077 sq mi (2,790 km^{2})
  - Land: 1,077 sq mi (2,790 km^{2})
  - Water: 0.9 sq mi (2.3 km^{2}) 0.09%

Population (2020)
  - Total: 39,517
  - Estimate (2025): 41,842 ▲
  - Density: 36.69/sq mi (14.17/km^{2})
- Time zone: UTC−8 (Pacific)
  - Summer (DST): UTC−7 (PDT)
- Congressional district: 1st
- Website: www.latah.id.us

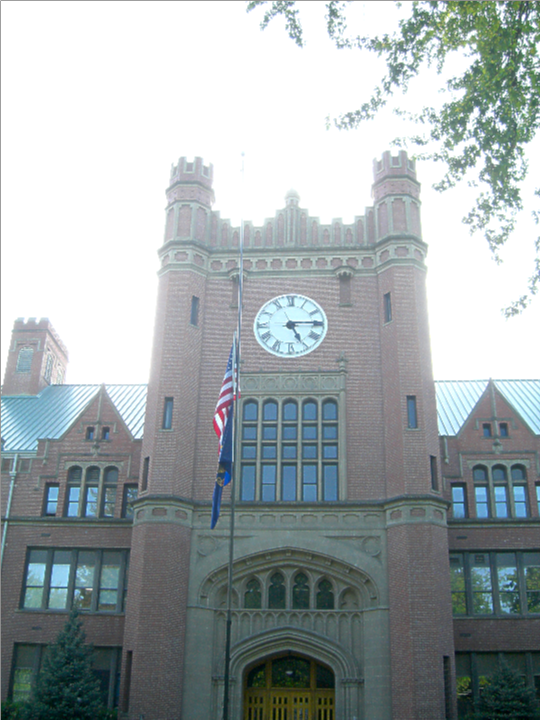
University of Idaho Administration Building (1909) in Moscow

Latah County (/ˈleɪtə/ LAY-tə) is a county located in the north central region of the U.S. state of Idaho. As of the 2020 census, the population was 39,517. The county seat and largest city is Moscow, the home of the University of Idaho, the state's flagship university.

The county was created in 1888 and named for Latah Creek in its northwest corner. The name was derived from two words in the Nez Perce language to evoke the sense of "the place of pine trees and sestle." The tribe found shade under the white pine trees for doing their work and stones suitable for use in pulverizing camas roots to process as one of their food staples.

Latah County comprises the Moscow, ID Micropolitan Statistical Area, which is included in the Pullman-Moscow, WA-ID Combined Statistical Area.

The county comprises the majority of the eastern portion of the Palouse, famous for its rolling hills and rich agriculture. Latah County is the only county in the U.S. established by an act of Congress; it was originally part of Nez Perce County, which was reluctant to lose its most populated area.

== History ==
=== Settlement ===
European-American settlement of the Palouse commenced in 1871. Development of population centers at Genesee and Moscow are the earliest followed by Juliaetta and Kendrick in the 1880s. The railroad's arrival in Moscow in 1885 led to its development as the primary population center of the county. The establishment of the University of Idaho at Moscow in 1889 also was significant in the city's continued growth. Settlement of Troy commenced in 1895 with Bovill being first settled by Lord Hugh Bovill in 1899. Construction of a railroad from Moscow to Bovill was completed in 1907 with the town of Deary developing in that year on the railroad. Potlatch was settled as a company town in 1905.

=== Development of cities ===
Moscow first shows in the 1880 census with a population of 76. It was incorporated as a village in 1887. Genesee was established as a town in 1889. Julieatta, Kendrick, and Troy were established as towns by the 1900 Census, with each incorporating as a village prior to 1910. Bovill and Deary were incorporated as villages prior to 1920. Potlatch and Onaway remained unincorporated as late as 1960. They were returned at the 1950 Census as a single unincorporated area.

=== County boundary history ===
The Idaho Territorial Legislature established the counties of Lah-Toh and Kootenai on December 22, 1864. Lah-Toh contained all of northern Idaho west of Shoshone County between the Clearwater River and 48° north latitude. Coeur d'Alene was named the county seat of Lah-Toh County. The legislature was well aware that settlement was lacking in the area to support a county government and established that the Governor could organize the county commission upon receipt of a petition from fifty residents. On January 9, 1867, the Fourth Idaho Legislature repealed the act creating the two counties, established the northern line of Nez Perce County to coincide with the present northern line of Latah County, and placed the remaining portion of Lah-Toh within the boundary of Kootenai County. Unaware of Lah-Toh's abolishment, residents of Moscow attempted to organize the county of Lah-Toh in 1878. Initially, the Governor granted the request, but later informed the residents that they were actually located within the boundary of Nez Perce County. The Idaho Territorial Legislature failed to address creation of a county for the residents of Moscow. As a result, Fred T. Dubois successfully petitioned on their behalf for the United States Congress to create the county. On May 14, 1888, Latah County with its seat at Moscow came into existence as the first and only U.S. county created by the United States Congress.

== Geography ==
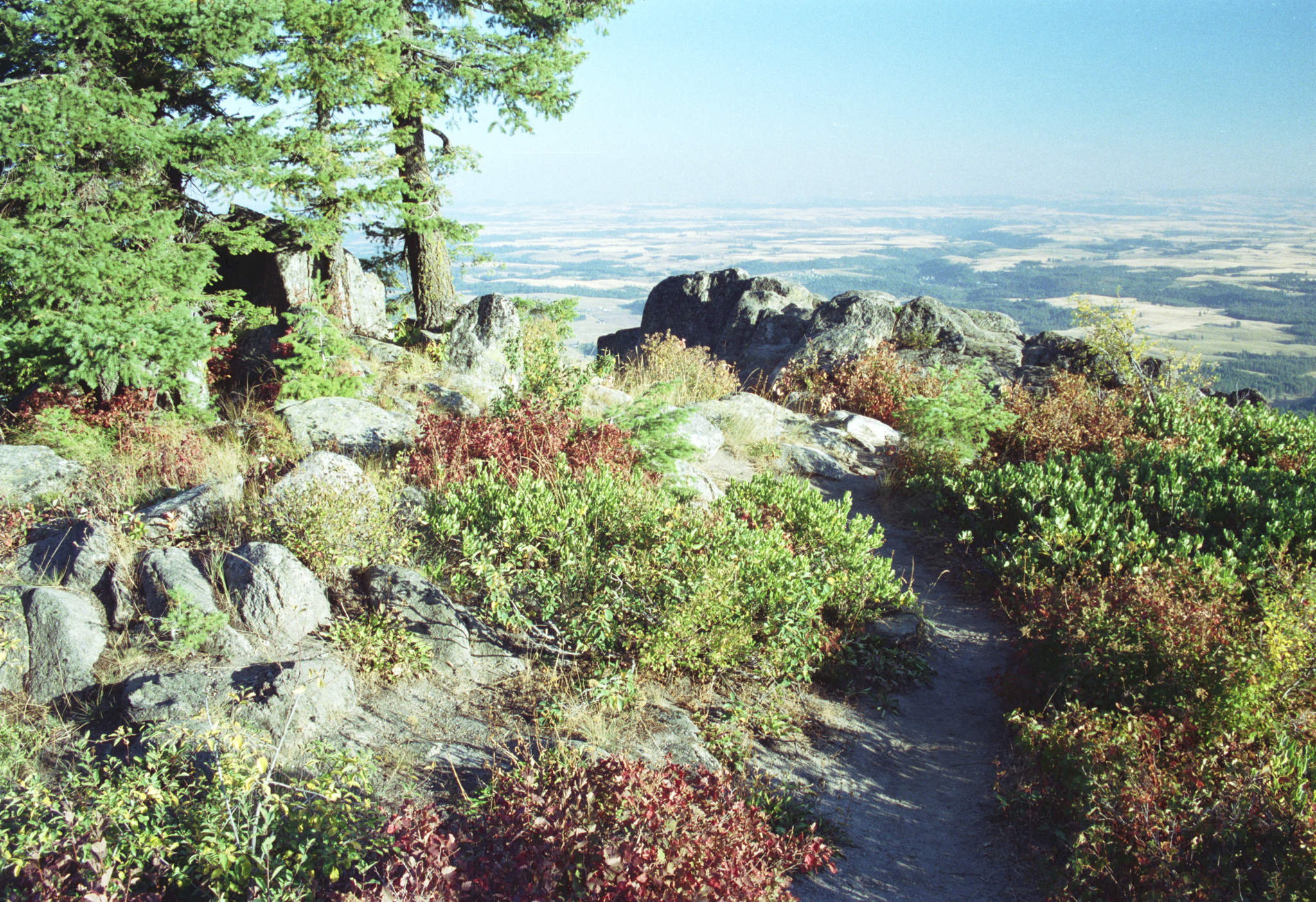
view from Moscow Mountain

According to the U.S. Census Bureau, the county has a total area of 1,077 square miles (2,790 km^{2}), of which 1,076 square miles (2,790 km^{2}) is land and 0.9 square miles (2.3 km^{2}) (0.09%) is water. It is part of the Palouse, a wide and rolling portion of the middle Columbia basin.

=== Adjacent counties ===
- Benewah County – north
- Shoshone County – northeast
- Clearwater County – east
- Nez Perce County – south
- Whitman County, Washington – west

=== Major highways ===
- US 95
- SH-3
- SH-6
- SH-8
- SH-9
- SH-99

=== National protected area ===
- St. Joe National Forest (part)

== Demographics ==
Historical population
| Census | Pop. | Note | %± |
|---|---|---|---|
| 1890 | 9,173 | | — |
| 1900 | 13,451 | | 46.6% |
| 1910 | 18,818 | | 39.9% |
| 1920 | 18,092 | | −3.9% |
| 1930 | 17,798 | | −1.6% |
| 1940 | 18,804 | | 5.7% |
| 1950 | 20,971 | | 11.5% |
| 1960 | 21,170 | | 0.9% |
| 1970 | 24,891 | | 17.6% |
| 1980 | 28,749 | | 15.5% |
| 1990 | 30,617 | | 6.5% |
| 2000 | 34,935 | | 14.1% |
| 2010 | 37,244 | | 6.6% |
| 2020 | 39,517 | | 6.1% |
| 2025 (est.) | 41,842 | ▲ | 5.9% |
U.S. Decennial Census; 1790–1960 1900–1990; 1990–2000 2010–2020 2020

=== Racial and ethnic composition ===
Latah County, Idaho – Racial and ethnic composition Note: the US Census treats Hispanic/Latino as an ethnic category. This table excludes Latinos from the racial categories and assigns them to a separate category. Hispanics/Latinos may be of any race.
| Race / Ethnicity (NH = Non-Hispanic) | Pop 1980 | Pop 1990 | Pop 2000 | Pop 2010 | Pop 2020 | % 1980 | % 1990 | % 2000 | % 2010 | % 2020 |
|---|---|---|---|---|---|---|---|---|---|---|
| White alone (NH) | 27,760 | 29,096 | 32,433 | 33,746 | 33,476 | 96.56% | 95.03% | 92.84% | 90.61% | 84.71% |
| Black or African American alone (NH) | 91 | 169 | 199 | 288 | 318 | 0.32% | 0.55% | 0.57% | 0.77% | 0.80% |
| Native American or Alaska Native alone (NH) | 133 | 192 | 239 | 218 | 263 | 0.46% | 0.63% | 0.68% | 0.59% | 0.67% |
| Asian alone (NH) | 322 | 700 | 729 | 773 | 968 | 1.12% | 2.29% | 2.09% | 2.08% | 2.45% |
| Native Hawaiian or Pacific Islander alone (NH) | x | x | 33 | 45 | 48 | x | x | 0.09% | 0.12% | 0.12% |
| Other race alone (NH) | 103 | 11 | 42 | 46 | 227 | 0.36% | 0.04% | 0.12% | 0.12% | 0.57% |
| Mixed race or Multiracial (NH) | x | x | 520 | 802 | 2,144 | x | x | 1.49% | 2.15% | 5.43% |
| Hispanic or Latino (any race) | 340 | 449 | 740 | 1,326 | 2,073 | 1.18% | 1.47% | 2.12% | 3.56% | 5.25% |
| Total | 28,749 | 30,617 | 34,935 | 37,244 | 39,517 | 100.00% | 100.00% | 100.00% | 100.00% | 100.00% |

=== 2020 census ===
As of the 2020 census, the county had a population of 39,517 and a median age of 31.0 years. 19.6% of residents were under the age of 18 and 14.7% of residents were 65 years of age or older.

For every 100 females there were 101.1 males, and for every 100 females age 18 and over there were 100.7 males age 18 and over.

The racial makeup of the county was 86.8% White, 0.8% Black or African American, 0.8% American Indian and Alaska Native, 2.5% Asian, 0.2% Native Hawaiian and Pacific Islander, 1.7% from some other race, and 7.3% from two or more races. Hispanic or Latino residents of any race comprised 5.2% of the population.

65.6% of residents lived in urban areas, while 34.4% lived in rural areas.

There were 16,063 households in the county, of which 24.6% had children under the age of 18 living with them and 24.7% had a female householder with no spouse or partner present. About 31.4% of all households were made up of individuals and 9.5% had someone living alone who was 65 years of age or older.

There were 17,259 housing units, of which 6.9% were vacant. Among occupied housing units, 54.4% were owner-occupied and 45.6% were renter-occupied. The homeowner vacancy rate was 1.3% and the rental vacancy rate was 5.1%.

=== 2010 census ===
As of the 2010 United States census, there were 37,244 people, 14,708 households, and 8,241 families residing in the county. The population density was 34.6 inhabitants per square mile (13.4/km^{2}). There were 15,988 housing units at an average density of 14.9 units per square mile (5.8 units/km^{2}). The racial makeup of the county was 92.8% white, 2.1% Asian, 0.8% black or African American, 0.6% American Indian, 0.1% Pacific islander, 1.0% from other races, and 2.5% from two or more races. Those of Hispanic or Latino origin made up 3.6% of the population. In terms of ancestry, 31.0% were German, 16.8% were English, 15.3% were Irish, 6.9% were Norwegian, 5.5% were Swedish, and 3.0% were American.

Of the 14,708 households, 25.1% had children under the age of 18 living with them, 46.3% were married couples living together, 6.1% had a female householder with no husband present, 44.0% were non-families, and 28.2% of all households were made up of individuals. The average household size was 2.32 and the average family size was 2.89. The median age was 28.3 years.

The median income for a household in the county was $36,974 and the median income for a family was $54,172. Males had a median income of $40,510 versus $31,223 for females. The per capita income for the county was $20,218. About 10.4% of families and 21.5% of the population were below the poverty line, including 18.7% of those under age 18 and 4.8% of those age 65 or over.

=== 2000 census ===
As of the 2000 census, there were 34,935 people, 13,059 households, and 7,770 families residing in the county. The population density was 32 people per square mile (12 people/km^{2}). There were 13,838 housing units at an average density of 13 units per square mile (5.0 units/km^{2}). The racial makeup of the county was 93.94% White, 0.59% Black or African American, 0.75% Native American, 2.10% Asian, 0.09% Pacific Islander, 0.77% from other races, and 1.76% from two or more races. 2.12% of the population were Hispanic or Latino of any race. 20.4% were of German, 13.5% English, 8.7% Irish, 7.8% American and 5.9% Norwegian ancestry.

There were 13,059 households, out of which 27.90% had children under the age of 18 living with them, 50.50% were married couples living together, 6.10% had a female householder with no husband present, and 40.50% were non-families. 26.30% of all households were made up of individuals, and 6.30% had someone living alone who was 65 years of age or older. The average household size was 2.38 and the average family size was 2.93.

In the county, the population was spread out, with 20.30% under the age of 18, 24.50% from 18 to 24, 26.90% from 25 to 44, 18.90% from 45 to 64, and 9.50% who were 65 years of age or older. The median age was 28 years. For every 100 females there were 107.50 males. For every 100 females age 18 and over, there were 108.10 males.

The median income for a household in the county was $32,524, and the median income for a family was $46,303. Males had a median income of $34,734 versus $24,886 for females. The per capita income for the county was $16,690. About 7.90% of families and 16.70% of the population were below the poverty line, including 10.20% of those under age 18 and 5.40% of those age 65 or over. Forty percent of all workers in Latah County work for the University of Idaho or Washington State University in nearby Pullman.

== Government and politics ==
United States presidential election results for Latah County, Idaho
| Year | Republican | | Democratic | | Third party(ies) | |
| Year | No. | % | No. | % | No. | % |
|---|---|---|---|---|---|---|
| 1892 | 1,242 | 45.46% | 0 | 0.00% | 1,490 | 54.54% |
| 1896 | 1,036 | 35.46% | 1,870 | 64.00% | 16 | 0.55% |
| 1900 | 2,013 | 50.11% | 2,004 | 49.89% | 0 | 0.00% |
| 1904 | 3,287 | 70.25% | 940 | 20.09% | 452 | 9.66% |
| 1908 | 3,101 | 56.12% | 1,802 | 32.61% | 623 | 11.27% |
| 1912 | 904 | 17.32% | 1,507 | 28.87% | 2,809 | 53.81% |
| 1916 | 2,777 | 44.99% | 2,811 | 45.54% | 584 | 9.46% |
| 1920 | 3,855 | 71.09% | 1,568 | 28.91% | 0 | 0.00% |
| 1924 | 3,053 | 52.28% | 1,949 | 33.37% | 838 | 14.35% |
| 1928 | 4,472 | 71.84% | 1,681 | 27.00% | 72 | 1.16% |
| 1932 | 3,079 | 45.61% | 3,554 | 52.64% | 118 | 1.75% |
| 1936 | 2,838 | 38.05% | 4,359 | 58.45% | 261 | 3.50% |
| 1940 | 3,971 | 46.72% | 4,494 | 52.87% | 35 | 0.41% |
| 1944 | 3,526 | 49.78% | 3,514 | 49.61% | 43 | 0.61% |
| 1948 | 3,805 | 48.23% | 3,810 | 48.30% | 274 | 3.47% |
| 1952 | 5,440 | 62.51% | 3,254 | 37.39% | 8 | 0.09% |
| 1956 | 5,024 | 57.71% | 3,682 | 42.29% | 0 | 0.00% |
| 1960 | 4,789 | 50.81% | 4,636 | 49.19% | 0 | 0.00% |
| 1964 | 3,475 | 39.83% | 5,249 | 60.17% | 0 | 0.00% |
| 1968 | 4,708 | 51.59% | 3,782 | 41.44% | 636 | 6.97% |
| 1972 | 6,043 | 55.35% | 4,548 | 41.66% | 327 | 3.00% |
| 1976 | 6,846 | 54.90% | 5,314 | 42.61% | 310 | 2.49% |
| 1980 | 6,967 | 46.78% | 5,037 | 33.82% | 2,888 | 19.39% |
| 1984 | 7,709 | 57.10% | 5,571 | 41.27% | 220 | 1.63% |
| 1988 | 6,367 | 48.47% | 6,544 | 49.82% | 225 | 1.71% |
| 1992 | 5,353 | 32.78% | 7,233 | 44.29% | 3,744 | 22.93% |
| 1996 | 6,311 | 38.74% | 7,741 | 47.52% | 2,238 | 13.74% |
| 2000 | 8,161 | 53.30% | 5,661 | 36.97% | 1,489 | 9.73% |
| 2004 | 8,686 | 49.48% | 8,430 | 48.03% | 437 | 2.49% |
| 2008 | 7,988 | 44.59% | 9,195 | 51.32% | 733 | 4.09% |
| 2012 | 7,589 | 44.32% | 8,306 | 48.51% | 1,229 | 7.18% |
| 2016 | 7,265 | 39.98% | 8,093 | 44.53% | 2,815 | 15.49% |
| 2020 | 9,472 | 45.96% | 10,236 | 49.67% | 902 | 4.38% |
| 2024 | 10,669 | 51.78% | 9,039 | 43.87% | 898 | 4.36% |

Latah County has long been one of the most politically competitive counties in Idaho, while the state as a whole is strongly Republican.

On January 3, 2017, the county had 21,723 registered voters; 10,629 (47%) are not registered by party, 6,965 (32%) are Republicans, 4,116 (19%) are Democrats, 290 are Libertarians, and 83 belong to the Constitution Party. Latah is one of seven Idaho counties where non-affiliated voters do outnumber Republicans. Like every Idaho county, Democrats rank third in terms of registered voter strength. In the state, Latah ranks fourth in percentage of non-affiliated voters, second in lowest percentage of Republicans, and third in percentage of Democrats.

From January 2014 to January 2016, Republicans increased their share of Latah voters by 9.88% while Democrats increased their share of voters by 7.23%. This trend is consistent with the three-year statewide trend where Republicans increased their overall share of voters by 15.6%, compared to 3.23% for Democrats. The county ranks ninth for total number of registered voters and fifth within the 1st Congressional District.

Latah was one of two Idaho counties to vote for Hillary Clinton in 2016 with 8,093 votes (44.5%), compared to 7,265 (40.0%) for Donald Trump and 2,798 (15.5%) for various other candidates.

Similar to statewide results, Senator Ted Cruz of Texas carried Latah County in the Republican primary of 2016, and Donald Trump trailed by 1,208 votes. Senator Bernie Sanders of Vermont won the Democratic county caucus with 84% of the vote.

County residents voted Republican in the 2000 and 2004 presidential elections, but at a lower rate than the rest of the state. George W. Bush carried Latah County in 2000 with 53.3% of the vote, but fell to 49.5% in 2004 as the Democratic share increased from 37.0% to 48.0%. Ralph Nader received 6.5% of the vote in 2000, but was not on the ballot in 2004. Barack Obama carried the county 51.9% to 45.1% in 2008 over John McCain, and won 49.6% to 45.3% in 2012 over Mitt Romney.

In 2006, Latah County voted 55.05% against HJR 2, which amended the Idaho Constitution to outlaw same-sex marriage; the measure passed with 63.35% of the statewide vote. Blaine County, with the resort area of Sun Valley and the state's sole Democratic stronghold (since 1992), was the only other county to reject HJR 2.

On the precinct level, Democrats generally carry the university city of Moscow by moderate margins, and the rural remainder of the county is strongly Republican.

The county is part of the first congressional district and is joined with Benewah County (to the north) in the fifth legislative district at the state level.

== Flora and fauna ==
There are numerous species of plants and animals within Latah County. There are a variety of tree species within the county including Western White Pine. Faunal species include the Clay-colored sparrow and Rough-Skinned Newt.

== Communities ==
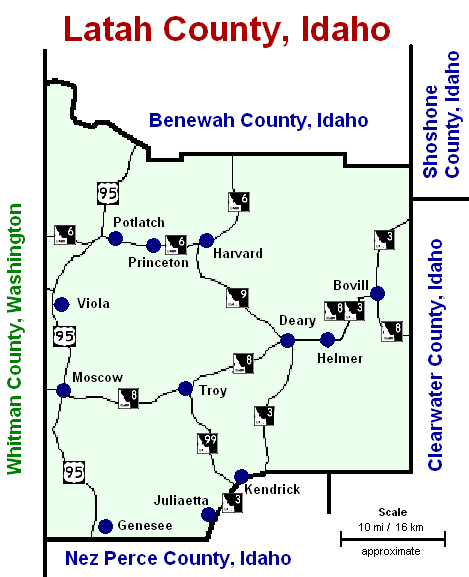

=== Cities ===
- Bovill
- Deary
- Genesee
- Juliaetta
- Kendrick
- Moscow
- Onaway
- Potlatch
- Troy

=== Census-designated place ===
- Princeton
- Viola

=== Unincorporated communities ===
- Avon
- Harvard
- Helmer
- Joel

=== Ghost towns ===
- Avon
- Blaine
- Brickaville
- Collins
- Cora
- Cornwall
- Crescent
- Estes
- Freeze
- Hampton
- Lenville
- Linden
- Nora
- Park
- Pine Creek
- Taney
- Thorn Creek
- Woodfell

== Education ==
School districts include:

- Genesee Joint School District 282
- Kendrick Joint School District 283
- Moscow School District 281
- Potlatch School District 285
- Troy School District 287
- Whitepine Joint School District 288

Higher education includes the University of Idaho and New Saint Andrew’s College.

== See also ==
- National Register of Historic Places listings in Latah County, Idaho
