= National Register of Historic Places listings in Adams County, Washington =

Location of Adams County in Washington

This list presents the full set of buildings, structures, objects, sites, or districts designated on the National Register of Historic Places in Adams County, Washington, and offers brief descriptive information about each of them. The National Register recognizes places of national, state, or local historic significance across the United States. Out of over 90,000 National Register sites nationwide, Washington is home to approximately 1,500, and 12 of those are found in Adams County.

This National Park Service list is complete through NPS recent listings posted March 21, 2025.

== Current listings ==
	Name on the Register	Image	Date listed	Location	City or town	Description
1	Adams County Courthouse	Adams County Courthouse	December 7, 2018 (#100003256)	210 W. Broadway Ave. 47°07′38″N 118°22′56″W	Ritzville	
2	Bassett Hardware Co. Store	Bassett Hardware Co. Store	May 15, 2022 (#100007729)	305 South Main St. 46°45′02″N 118°18′58″W	Washtucna	
3	Dr. Frank R. Burroughs House	Dr. Frank R. Burroughs House	November 20, 1975 (#75001838)	408 West Main Avenue; 47°07′31″N 118°22′59″W	Ritzville	
4	Denver and Rio Grande Western Railroad Business Car No. 101	Denver and Rio Grande Western Railroad Business Car No. 101	June 16, 1988 (#88000740)	In Bruce, Washington, about 6 miles (9.7 km) east of Othello; 46°50′09″N 119°02′56″W	Othello	
5	Nelson H. Greene House	Nelson H. Greene House	March 7, 1980 (#80003996)	502 South Adams Street; 47°07′22″N 118°22′34″W	Ritzville	
6	Ritzville Carnegie Library	Ritzville Carnegie Library	August 3, 1982 (#82004192)	302 West Main Avenue; 47°07′35″N 118°22′55″W	Ritzville	Also a contributing property to Ritzville Historic District.
7	Ritzville High School	Ritzville High School	May 19, 1994 (#94000476)	7th Avenue, between South Columbia Street and South Division Street; 47°07′25″N 118°22′19″W	Ritzville	Building demolished in 2013.
8	Ritzville Historic District	Ritzville Historic District	May 2, 1990 (#90000676)	Roughly bounded by Broadway Avenue, North Division Street, West Railroad Avenue, and North Adams Street; 47°07′37″N 118°22′51″W	Ritzville	
9	Seivers Brothers Ranchhouse and Barn	Seivers Brothers Ranchhouse and Barn	June 19, 1979 (#79002524)	On Providence Road, about 6.5 miles (10.5 km) southeast of Lind; 46°54′43″N 118°30′31″W	Lind	
10	Spokane, Portland and Seattle Railway Company-Cow Creek Viaduct	Spokane, Portland and Seattle Railway Company-Cow Creek Viaduct	December 31, 2018 (#100003278)	Milepost 304.4 former SP&S RR line 46°50′34″N 118°08′37″W	Ankeny vicinity	
11	Spokane, Portland and Seattle Railway Company Bridge 291.4--O.W.R.&N. Crossing-Washtucna	Spokane, Portland and Seattle Railway Company Bridge 291.4--O.W.R.&N. Crossing-Washtucna	December 31, 2018 (#100003279)	Milepost 291.4, former SP&S line crossing Yeisley Rd. 46°45′09″N 118°17′58″W	Washtucna vicinity	
12	Strap Iron Corral	Strap Iron Corral	August 1, 1975 (#75001837)	On Cow Creek, about 5.8 miles (9.3 km) north of Hooper; 46°50′19″N 118°07′36″W	Hooper	

== See also ==
- National Register of Historic Places listings in Washington state
- Listings in neighboring counties: Franklin, Grant, Lincoln, Whitman
- Historic preservation
- History of Washington (state)
- Index of Washington (state)-related articles
