= A. J. Christoff =

American football coach

Biographical details
- Born: November 18, 1944 (age 81); Ritzville, Washington, U.S.
- Education: University of Idaho (1971); Oregon State University (1972)

Playing career
- 1968–1971: Idaho
- Positions: Linebacker, defensive end

Coaching career (HC unless noted)
- 1972: Oregon State (GA)
- 1973–1974: New Mexico (DB/RC)
- 1975–1976: Idaho (AHC/DC/DB)
- 1977–1978: Oregon (ILB)
- 1979–1982: Oregon (DC/DB)
- 1983: Stanford (DC/DB)
- 1984–1985: Notre Dame (DC/DB)
- 1986: Georgia Tech (DB)
- 1987–1989: Alabama (DB)
- 1990–1994: UCLA (DB)
- 1995–1998: Colorado (DC/DB)
- 2000: USC (LB)
- 2001–2002: Cincinnati (DC)
- 2003–2004: Stanford (DC/DB)
- 2005: San Francisco 49ers (DB)
- 2006: Stanford (DC/DB)
- 2007–2011: VMI (DC)

Andrew James Christoff (born November 18, 1944) is an American football coach. He was defensive coordinator for 18 seasons at six schools—Idaho, Oregon, Stanford, Notre Dame, Colorado and Cincinnati.

From Ritzville, Washington, Christoff graduated from Ritzville High School in 1963, and was recruited to play at Idaho under head coach Dee Andros. He received a bachelor's degree in education from the University of Idaho in 1967 and a completed master's degree at Oregon State University in 1970.
