= Washington, Idaho and Montana Railway =

Railway in Washington and Idaho

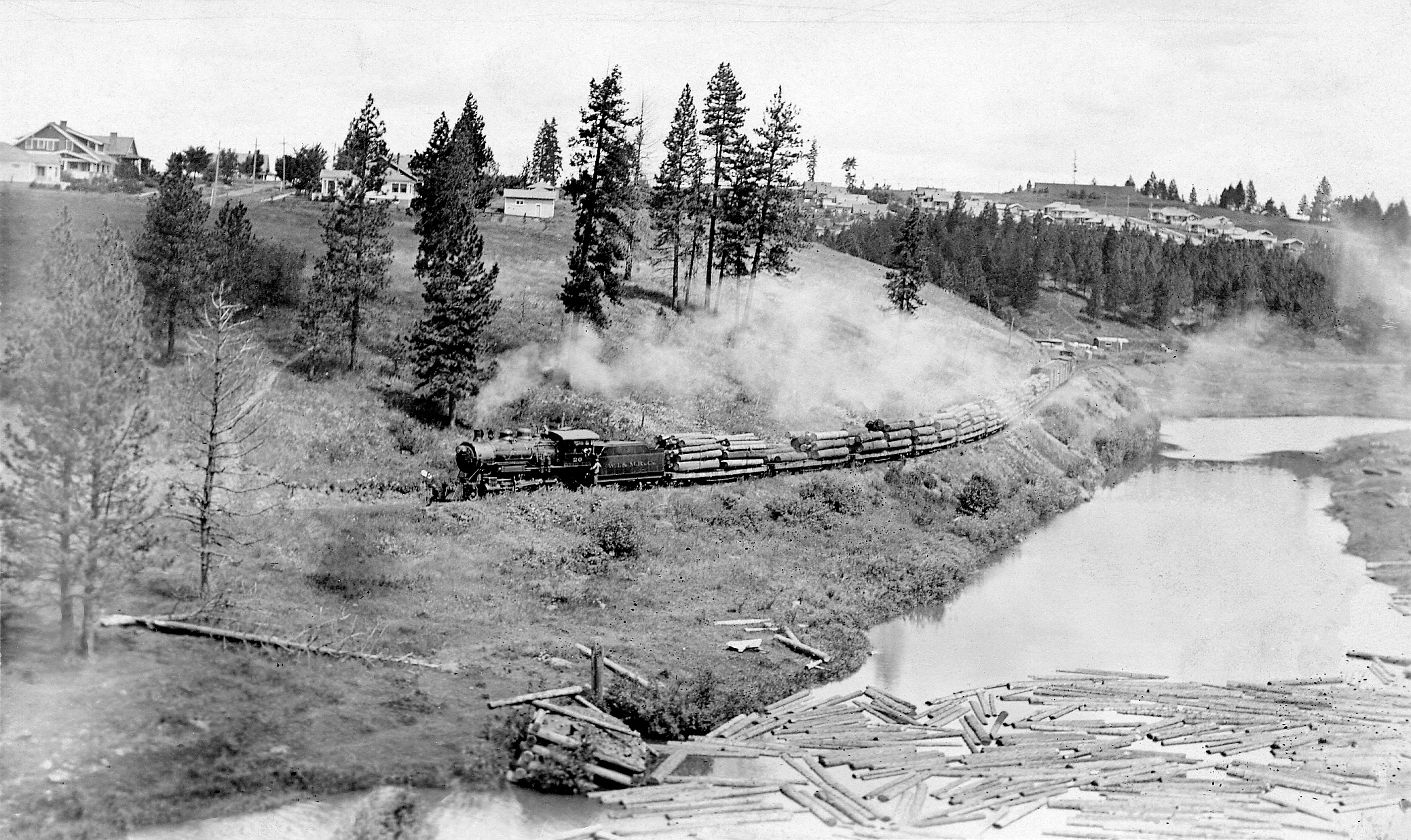
A Washington, Idaho and Montana Railway train beside the Palouse River, bringing logs to the mill at Potlatch, Idaho (circa 1910)

The Washington, Idaho and Montana Railway is a short-line railroad in the northwest United States, described as "a single-track standard gauge steam railroad" that runs between Bovill, Idaho and Palouse, Washington. Construction began 121 years ago in May 1905 by the Potlatch Lumber Company as a logging railroad, but it also carried other freight, passengers, and mail. By the end of that year, twenty miles (32 km) of track had been laid, and by the end of 1906, the track reached Bovill.

Although the railway was to extend into Montana, these plans were abandoned, for two main reasons. The first was a 1910 forest fire along the North Fork of the Clearwater River, which destroyed valuable timber and the second was an agreement between Chicago, Milwaukee & Puget Sound railway (which operated into Montana) and the Washington, Idaho & Montana railway for joint use of tracks at Bovill and a division of rates.

Engine 1 of the railroad and a railroad depot is preserved in the Commercial Historic District of Potlatch, Idaho, which is listed on the National Register of Historic Places. One of the line's original passenger cars, combine car 306, which served the railroad from 1909 until being sold and converted into an outbuilding on a farm in the 1950s, was restored in 2020 and now serves as an Airbnb near Deary, Idaho.

In February 2026, service on the railroad resumed for the first time since 2018. Its only customer in 2018, Bennet Lumber Products, purchased the line and leased it to Washington, Idaho & Montana Railway LLC.
