= Nelson H. Greene House =

Historic house in Washington, United States

- U.S. National Register of Historic Places
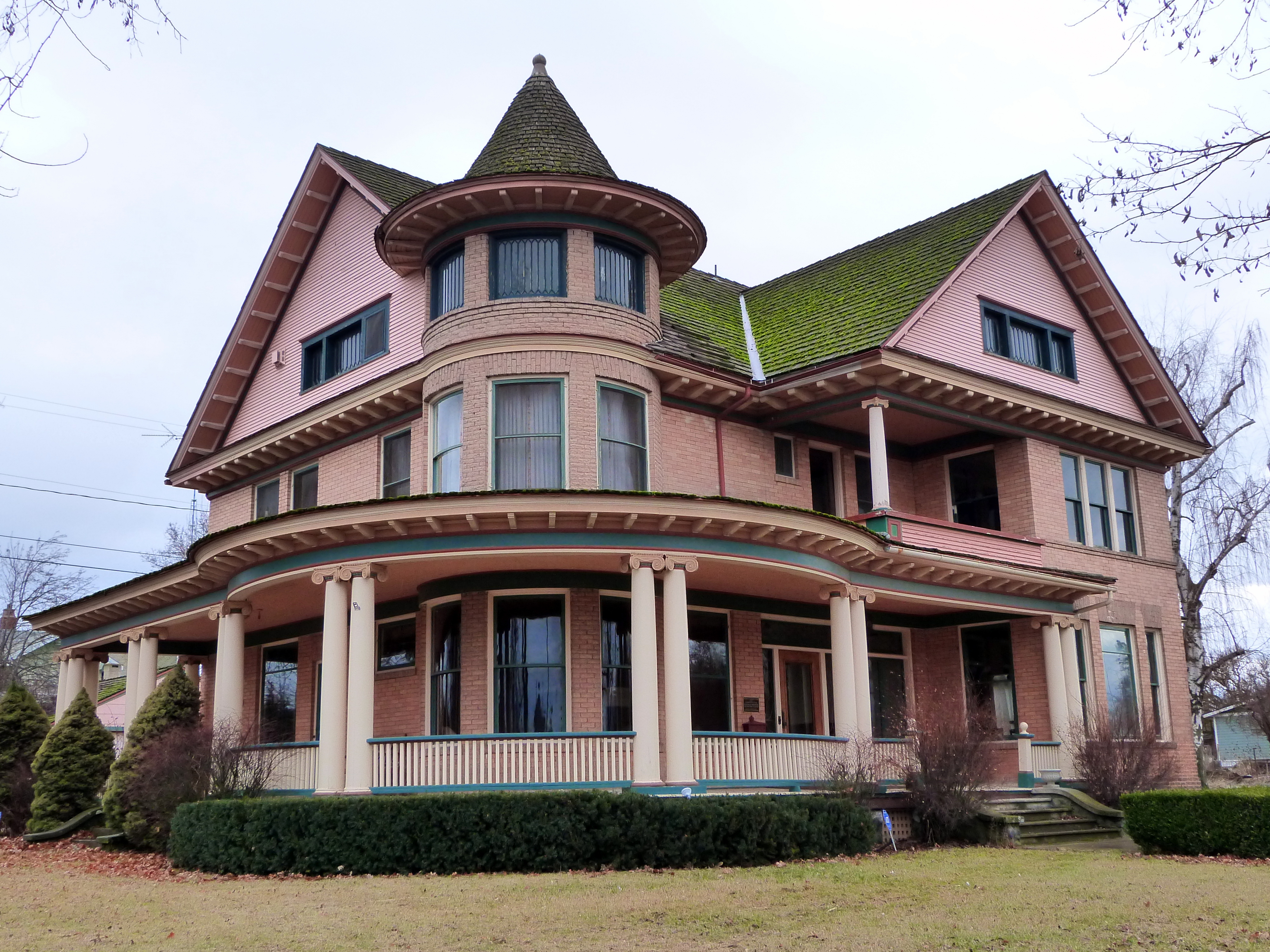
- The house's exterior in 2015

- Location within Washington (state)
- Location: 502 South Adams Street, Ritzville, Washington
- Coordinates: 47°07′22″N 118°22′34″W
- Area: 0.344 acres (0.139 ha)
- Built: 1902
- Architect: C. Ferris White
- Architectural style: Classical Revival, Queen Anne
- NRHP reference No.: 80003996
- Added to NRHP: March 7, 1980

The Nelson H. Greene House, located in Ritzville, Washington, United States, is a house listed on the National Register of Historic Places. It was designed for former Ritzville mayor Nelson H. Greene by prominent Spokane architect C. Ferris White.

== See also ==
- National Register of Historic Places listings in Washington
