= Ritzville Carnegie Library =

- U.S. National Register of Historic Places
- U.S. Historic district – Contributing property
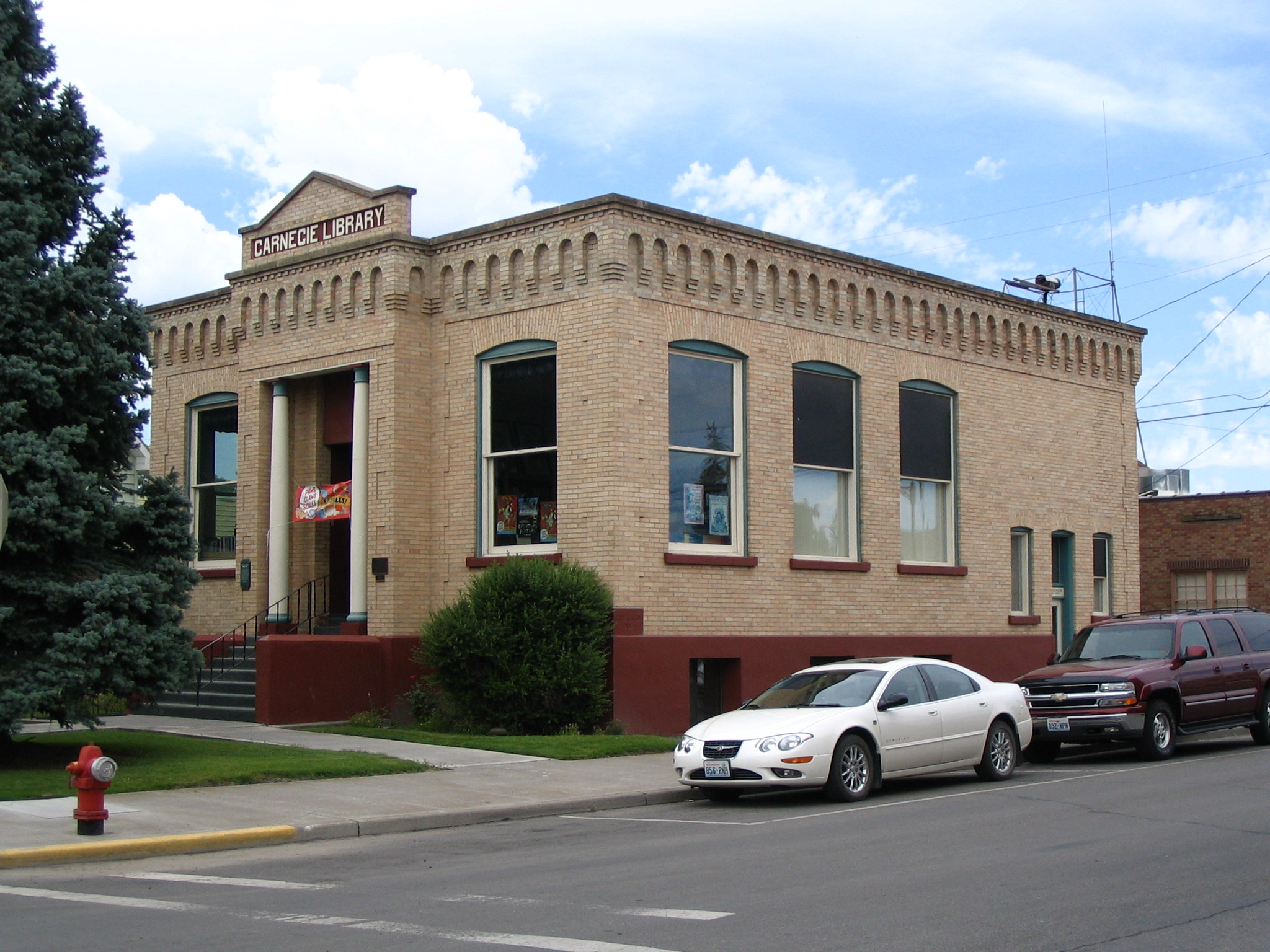
- Ritzville Carnegie Library in 2007

- Location within Washington (state)
- Location: 302 West Main Avenue, Ritzville, Washington
- Coordinates: 47°07′35″N 118°22′55″W
- Area: less than one acre
- Built: 1907
- Architect: Preusse & Zittel
- Part of: Ritzville Historic District (ID90000676)
- MPS: Carnegie Libraries of Washington TR
- NRHP reference No.: 82004192

Significant dates
- Added to NRHP: August 3, 1982
- Designated CP: May 2, 1990

The Ritzville Carnegie Library, located in Ritzville, Washington, is a building listed on the National Register of Historic Places. It was built in 1907 with a grant from Andrew Carnegie and still operates as Ritzville's library. It was designed by the Spokane architectural firm of Preusse & Zittel.

Daniel Buchanan created a library in 1902 when he donated 268 books to the town, and a small library was created above a store. In 1903, the town allocated $1000 toward the maintenance of the library. By 1906, the citizens of Ritzville had convinced Carnegie to help, and he pledged $10,000 toward a permanent library if the town secured and maintained a location for it. At that time, Ritzville was the smallest town in the United States to receive financial assistance from Carnegie for a library. Its basement was used for town council meetings.

== See also ==
- National Register of Historic Places listings in Adams County, Washington
