= C. Ferris White =

American architect

Clarence Ferris White (August 22, 1867 – August 28, 1932) was a prolific architect in the Pacific Northwest. He designed more than 1,100 buildings, including 63 schools, in the State of Washington. His largest project was the design of the company town of Potlatch, Idaho in 1905. Several of his works are listed on the United States National Register of Historic Places.

== Biography ==
White was born in Chicago, Illinois in 1867 and was educated in the Chicago public school system. He began his architectural career working as a draftsman in the offices of W. W. Meyers, Sprague & Newell, and W. W. Clay. He moved to Spokane, Washington, in 1890 and began working in the office of Herman Preusse. Shortly thereafter, he started working for C. B. Seaton, with whom he later formed the partnership Seaton & White. He operated the partnership's office in what later became Bellingham, Washington until April 1892, when the partnership with Seaton ended. From 1892 to 1896, White conducted an architectural practice at Everett, Washington. While in Everett, White designed numerous public school buildings and business blocks. In November 1896, he returned to Spokane, working in partnerships with Seaton, then W. A. Alexander, and later A. E. Permaine, Oscar Huber and John W. Strack. By the turn of the century, White was in solo practice, remaining as such until 1904.

White was married in April 1898 to Florence Adelaide Sargent (born April 1869). He moved for a time to California's Inland Empire due to his wife's ill health, leaving his Spokane practice under the supervision of Alfred Jones. His wife died in 1903 and in 1905 White returned to his practice in Spokane. White married Sara T. Lawrence in 1920. In 1923, he left his practice in Spokane, and relocated to Everett, Washington with his wife. He continued to reside in Everett until his death and worked as an architect there, designing structures including the Labor Temple built in 1929, the Sevenich House built in 1930, and a mortuary (at Pacific & Wetmore Avenues) completed in 1932. White was a member of the Elks, the Spokane Athletic Club, the Inland Club, and the Coeur d'Alene Boat Club. He was also active in politics as an organizer of the "silver wing" of the Republican Party of Snohomish County, Washington. He died in August 1932 at Everett, Washington.

== Works ==
White designed more than 1,100 buildings in the State of Washington, including 63 schools. His largest commission was obtained in 1905 when he was hired by the Potlatch Corporation, a lumber company, to design a company town that became Potlatch, Idaho. White sought to design a model town. In ten months at Potlatch, he "had under contract work amounting to five hundred thousand dollars." He designed over 300 buildings comprising "the entire town except the mill." His works in Potlatch included many that have been listed on the United States National Register of Historic Places, including "working men's cottages, ranging in price from five hundred to two thousand dollars, and for the officers of the company ... residences ranging in price from two to eight thousand dollars." His works in Potlatch also included a hotel, a theater, churches, depots, schools, a theater/opera house, and company store.

=== Selected works ===
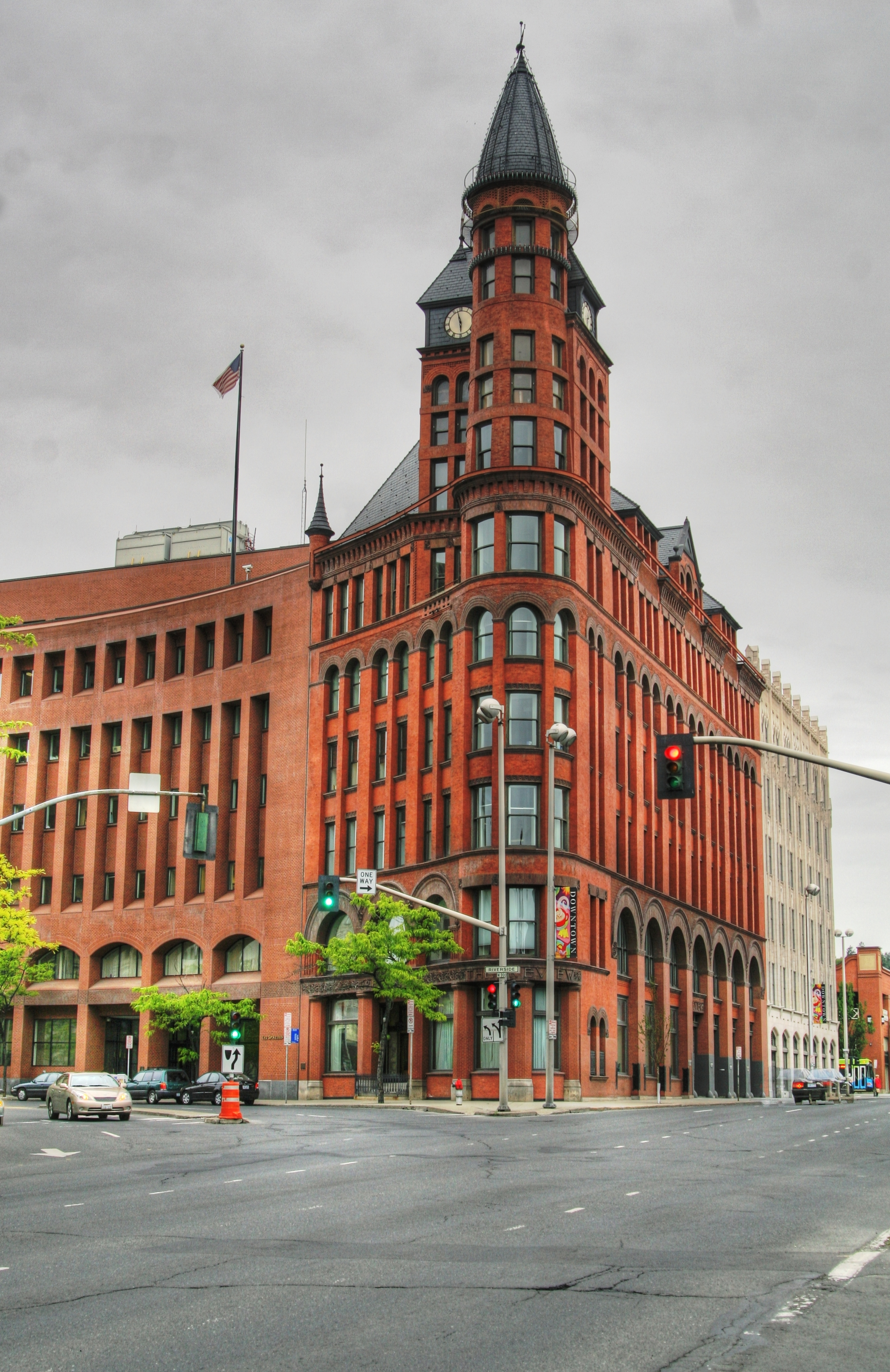
The Spokesman-Review Building in Spokane designed by White and Seaton

White's works include (with attribution):

Works in Spokane

- Transient Hotel (also known as Minnesota Building), 423 W. 1st Avenue, Spokane, Washington
- Waldo Paine House, Spokane, Washington
- The Spokesman-Review Building in Spokane, Washington (with C. B. Seaton)
- Old Exposition Building, Spokane, Washington (with C. B. Seaton)
- Frank H. Graves Residence, Spokane, Washington
- T. W. Spencer Residence, Spokane, Washington
- George W. Wooster Residence, Spokane, Washington
- A. T. Kendrick House, Cliff Park, Spokane, Washington

Works in Potlatch

- Three-Room House, 940 Cedar Street, Potlatch, Idaho (White, C. Ferris), NRHP-listed
- Boarding House, 850 Pine Street, Potlatch, Idaho (White, C. Ferris), NRHP-listed
- One or more works in Commercial Historic District, roughly Pine Street between Seventh and Fifth Streets, Potlatch, Idaho (White, C. Ferris), NRHP-listed
- One or more works in Nob Hill Historic District, roughly bounded by Fourth, Spruce, Third, and Cedar Streets, Potlatch, Idaho (White, C. Ferris), NRHP-listed
- One or more works in Workers' Neighborhood Historic District, roughly Spruce Street between Eighth and Fifth Streets, Potlatch, Idaho (White, C. Ferris), NRHP-listed

Other works'

- Nelson H. Greene House, Ritzville, Washington, NRHP-listed.
- Labor Temple, from 1930, 2812 Lombard Avenue, in the Hewitt Avenue Historic District, Everett, Washington
- State Normal Building, Cheney, Washington (with C. B. Seaton)
- Sorrento Apartments (1911)
