= Seivers Brothers Ranchhouse and Barn =

- U.S. National Register of Historic Places
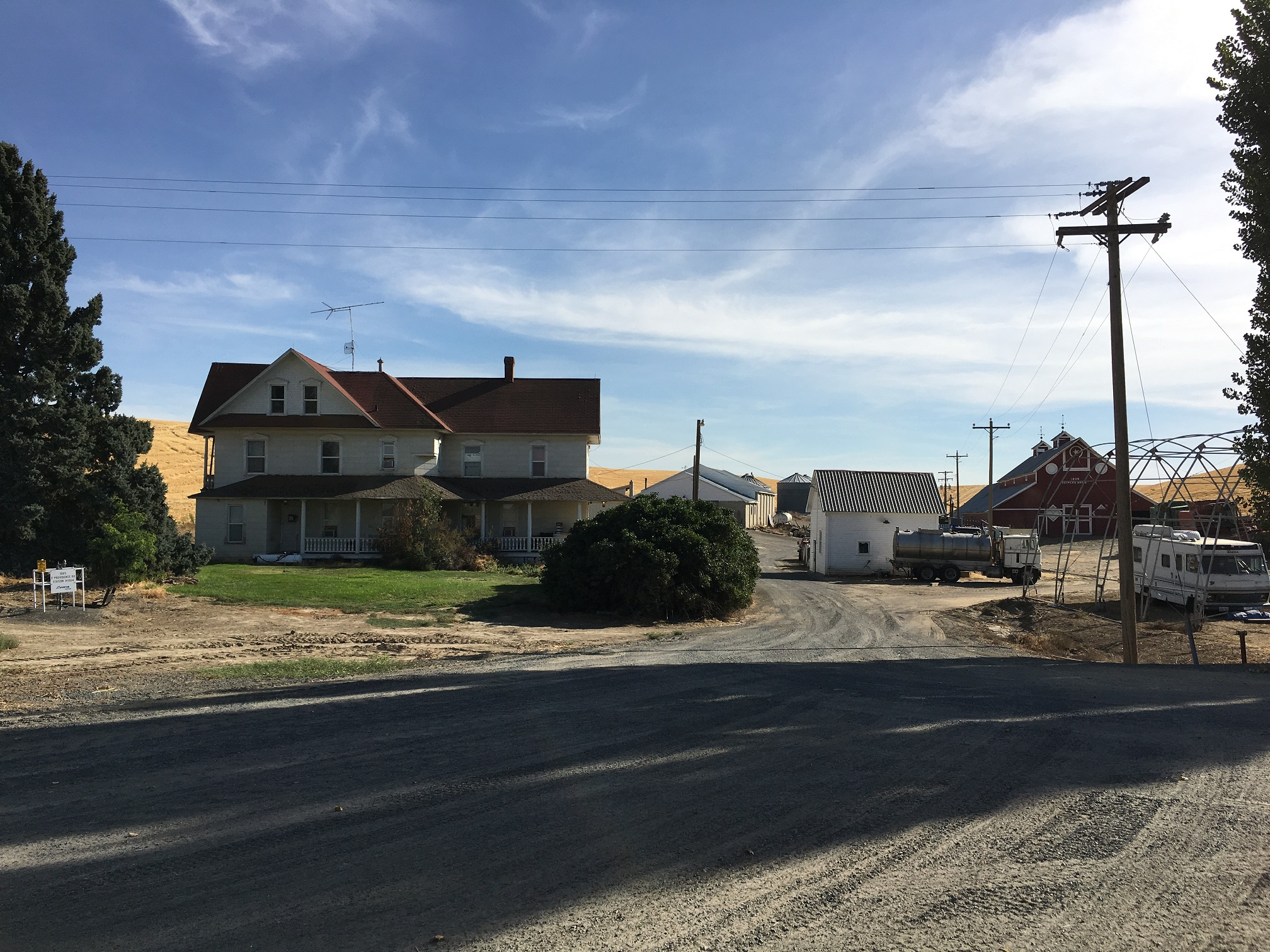

- Location within Washington (state)
- Location: On Providence Road, about 6.5 miles (10.5 km) southeast of Lind
- Nearest city: Lind, Washington
- Coordinates: 46°54′43″N 118°30′31″W
- Area: 2.75 acres (1.11 ha)
- Built: 1905
- Architect: P. Barnum; Ed Crumbley; Nicholas Seivers; Peter Seivers
- NRHP reference No.: 79002524
- Added to NRHP: June 19, 1979

The Seivers Brothers Ranchhouse and Barn, located about 6.5 miles (10.5 km) southeast of Lind, Washington, is a historic farmstead, comprising a barn, built in 1905 by P. Barnum, and the ranchouse, completed in 1910 by the Seivers brothers and Ed Crumbley.

The property was listed on the National Register of Historic Places in 1979.

== See also ==
- National Register of Historic Places listings in Washington
