= Ritzville Historic District =

Historic district in Washington, United States

- U.S. National Register of Historic Places
- U.S. Historic district
- Location within Washington (state)

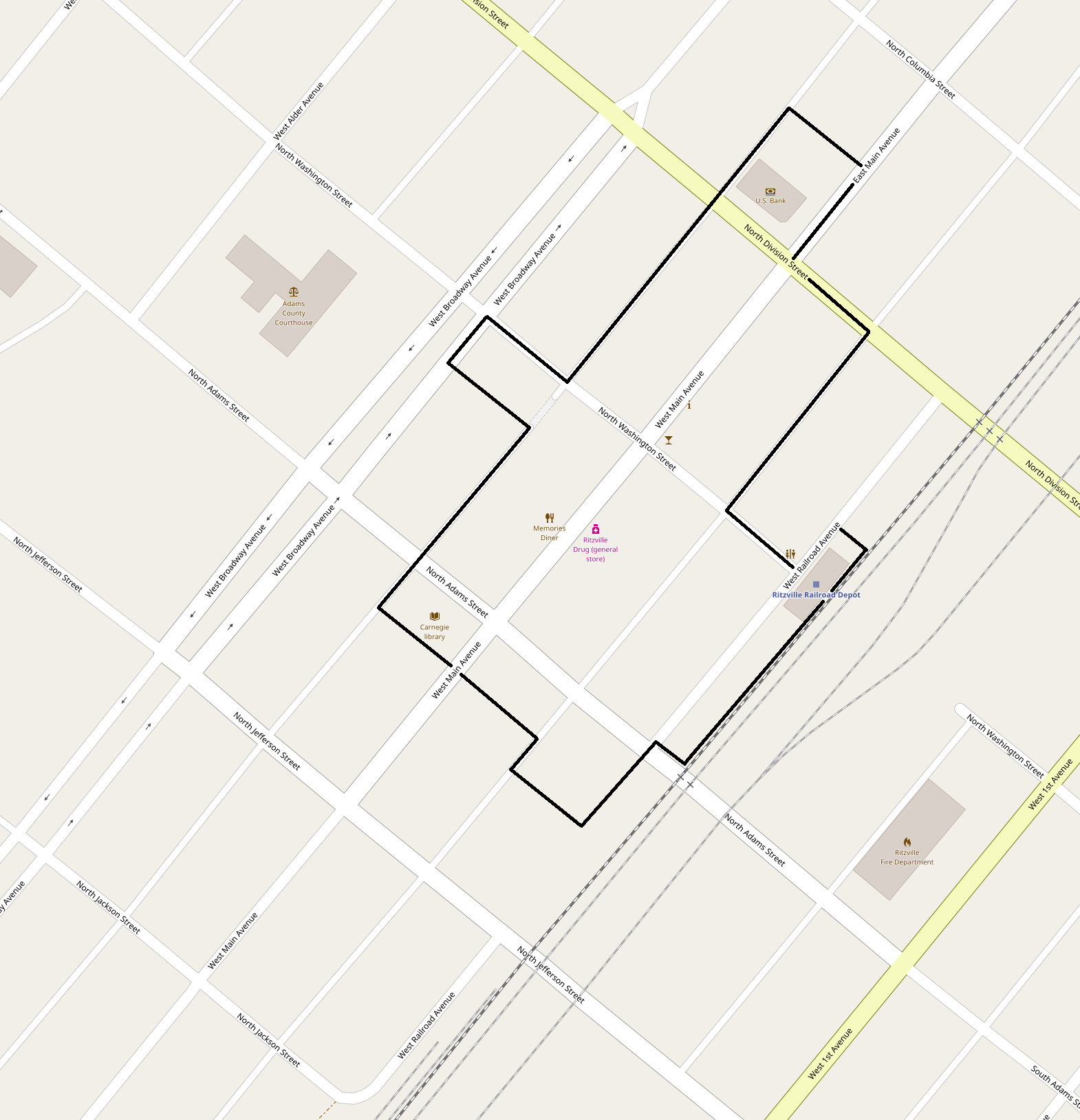
- Location: Roughly bounded by Broadway Avenue, North Division Street, West Railroad Avenue, and North Adams Street, Ritzville, Washington
- Coordinates: 47°07′37″N 118°22′51″W
- Area: 8 acres (3.2 ha)
- Architect: Tinnel Brothers; Et al.
- Architectural style: Late 19th and 20th Century Revivals, Vernacular commercial
- NRHP reference No.: 90000676
- Added to NRHP: May 2, 1990

The Ritzville Historic District, located in Ritzville, Washington, is a district listed on the National Register of Historic Places. The district encompasses 3 blocks of Ritzville's main business district and contains 27 contributing and 11 noncontributing properties.

== Contributing Properties ==
The historical district contains a total of 27 contributing properties, built between 1889 and 1935:

- The Ritzville Carnegie Library, also known as Ritzville Public Library, at 302 West Main Avenue, 47°07′35″N 118°22′55″W, built 1907.
- The Ritzville Hotel, 220 West Main Avenue, 47°07′35″N 118°22′54″W, built 1910.
- The George H. Lemman Building, also known as the B&J Restaurant, 214 West Main Avenue, 47°07′36″N 118°22′54″W, built c. 1905.
- The F.G. Spanjer Building, 208 West Main Avenue, 47°07′37″N 118°22′53″W, built 1898.
- The Ritzville Trading Company Buildings block, at 202 West Main Avenue, 201 and 203 West Broadway Avenue, 47°07′37″N 118°22′53″W, built 1898.
- The H.E. Gritman Building, at corner of West Main Avenue and North Washington Street, 47°07′38″N 118°22′51″W, built 1902.
- The William Snyder Building, at 116 West Main Avenue, 47°07′38″N 118°22′51″W, built 1899.
- The O.R. Haight Building, at 114 West Main Avenue, 47°07′38″N 118°22′51″W, built 1901.
- The A&C Bakery building, at 102 and 104 West Main Avenue, 47°07′39″N 118°22′50″W, built 1910.
- The Pioneer State Bank, now U.S. Bank, at 101 East Main Avenue, 47°07′40″N 118°22′49″W, built 1901.
- The Ritz Theater, at 107 East Main Avenue, 47°07′40″N 118°22′48″W, built c. 1935.
- The Hanson Flower's building, at 105 West Main Avenue, 47°07′38″N 118°22′48″W, built c. 1905.
- The Burt's Hardware building, at 107 West Main Avenue, 47°07′38″N 118°22′48″W, built c. 1905.
- The Sears building, at 109 and 111 West Main Avenue, 47°07′37″N 118°22′49″W, built between 1910 and 1920.
- The N.H. Greene Building, at 119 West Main Avenue, 47°07′37″N 118°22′50″W, built 1889.
- The German American Bank, now Columbia Bank, at 201 West Main Avenue, 47°07′36″N 118°22′50″W, built 1904.
- The Orris Dorman Building, at 203 and 205 West Main Avenue, 47°07′36″N 118°22′51″W, built 1904.
- The A.F. Rosenoff Building, at 207 West Main Avenue, 47°07′35″N 118°22′51″W, built 1901.
- The Myers Dry Goods Store Building, at 209 and 211 West Main Avenue, 47°07′35″N 118°22′51″W, built c. 1901–1904.
- The building at 213 West Main Avenue, 47°07′35″N 118°22′52″W, built c. 1901–1904.
- The Adams County Bank Building, at 301 West Main Avenue, 47°07′33″N 118°22′53″W, built 1892.
- The Kalkwarf Motor Company Building, 101 to 107 North Adams Street, 47°07′32″N 118°22′53″W, built 1910.
- The E.D. Gilson Building, at 218 West Railroad Avenue, 47°07′34″N 118°22′51″W, built 1904.
- The Journal Building, at 214 and 216 West Railroad Avenue, 47°07′34″N 118°22′50″W, built c. 1910–1920.
- The Kalkwarf Hardware Store, at 210 West Railroad Avenue, 47°07′34″N 118°22′50″W, built c. 1910–1920.
- The Northern Pacific Railway Depot, now hosting the Railroad Depot Museum, at 201 West Railroad Avenue, 47°07′35″N 118°22′48″W, built 1909–1910.

== See also ==
- National Register of Historic Places listings in Washington
