= Hewitt Avenue Historic District =

Historic district in Washington, United States

- U.S. National Register of Historic Places
- U.S. Historic district
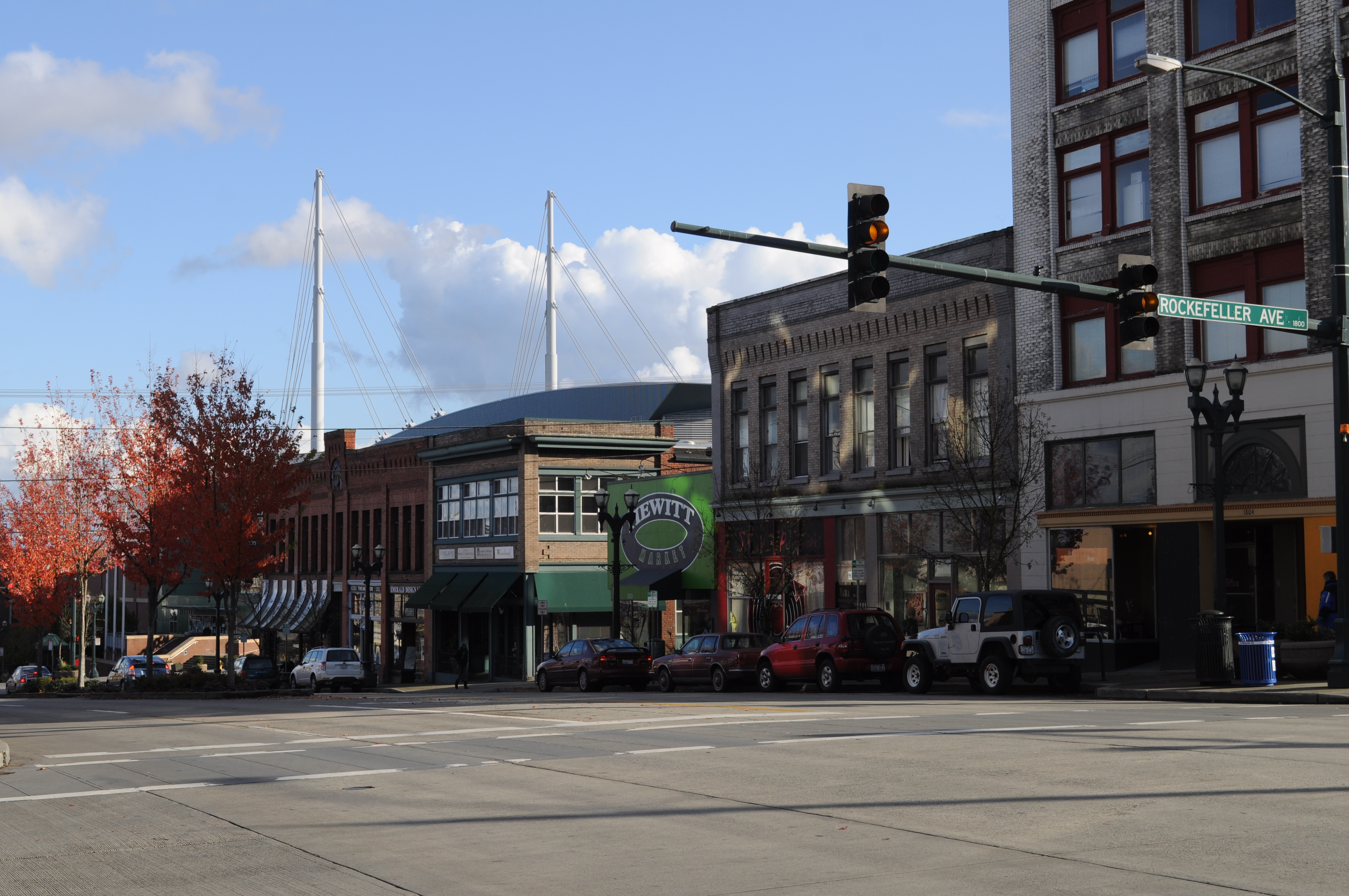
- South side of the 1800 block of Hewitt Avenue

- Location within Washington (state) Location within the United States
- Location: 1620-1915 Hewitt Ave. and portions of Wetmore, Rockefeller, Oakes, and Lombard Ave., Everett, Washington
- Coordinates: 47°58′45″N 122°12′19″W
- NRHP reference No.: 10001020
- Added to NRHP: December 13, 2010

The Hewitt Avenue Historic District is a section of downtown Everett in Washington, that was listed on the National Register of Historic Places in 2010.

It includes the Labor Temple, at 2812 Lombard Avenue, an "eclectic" building built in 1930 which was designed by architect C. Ferris White.

It also includes works by architects Benjamin F. Turnbull, Morrison & Stimson, Clayton Wilson, and A.F. Heide and work built by Howard S. Wright, contractor. A pair of early 20th century buildings were demolished in 2002 to make way for the Everett Events Center, an indoor sports arena and convention center at the southwest side of Hewitt Avenue and Broadway. The Hewitt Avenue Historic District was added to the National Register of Historic Places in 2011 and commemorated with new street signs in 2013.
