= Combine demolition derby =

Demolition derby featuring combine harvesters

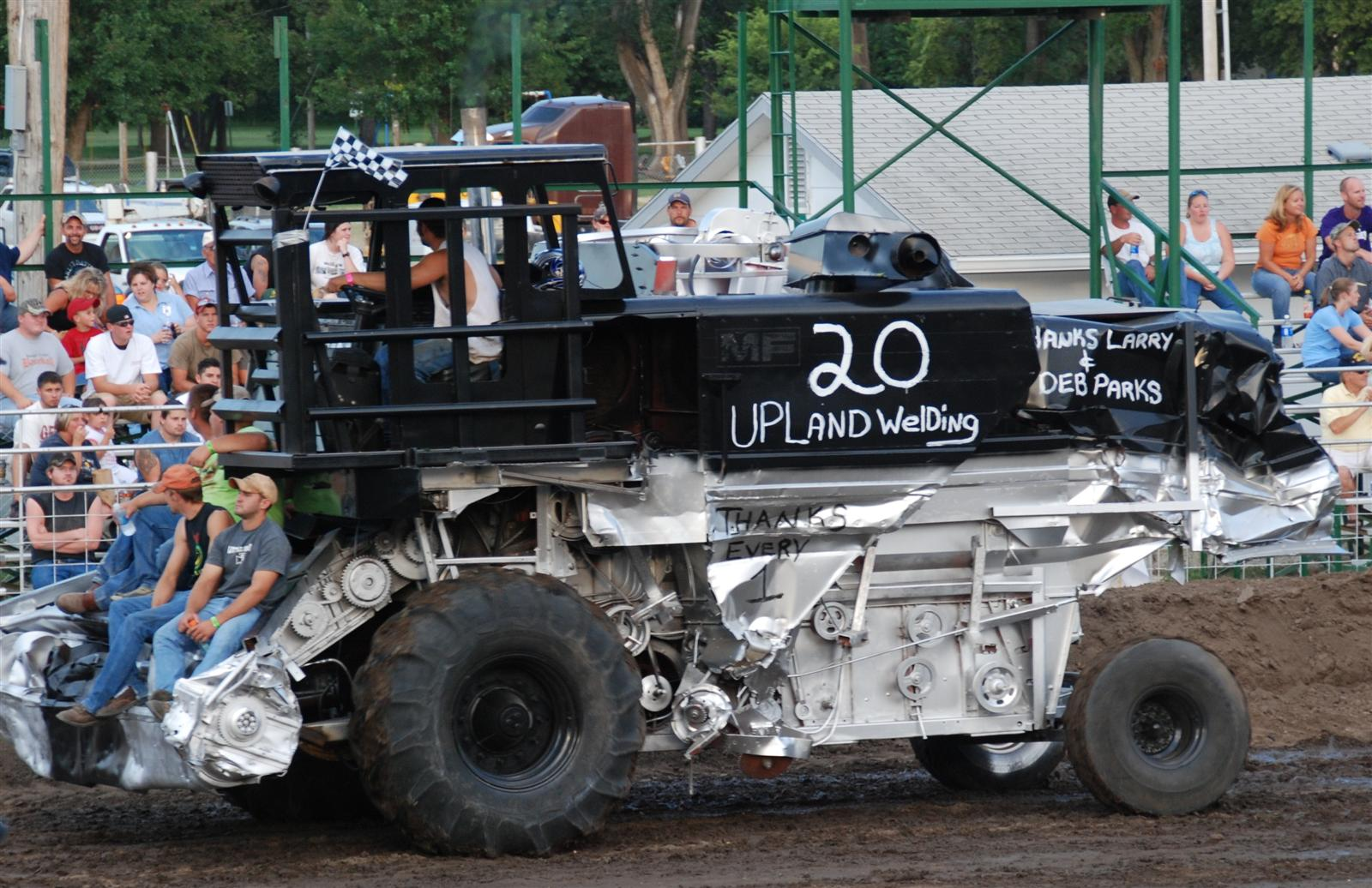
A contestant in a combine demolition derby

A combine demolition derby is a demolition derby in which combine harvesters are used.

Three combines about to begin a heat at the Columbiana County Fair

Derbies sometimes last for up to three hours. Competitors typically remove heavy or unneeded parts of the combines before competitions and reinforce the front, or header, of the vehicle. A vehicle is deemed eliminated once its header section is destroyed or the combine is immobilized. Competitors attempt to use the header to pop other vehicle's tires, rupture their drive belts, or tear off their header. The competitions can end in ties if the only remaining machines become inextricably tangled together. The competition in Lind, Washington often includes multiple heats, including rounds for event veterans, rookies, and consolation rounds for losers. In Michigan, there is a derby circuit with competitions in several towns.

Competitors use old worn-out combines for the competitions; the use of new combines would be prohibitively expensive. Many, but not all, of the contestants are farmers. Some of the combines used date from the 1960s. The vehicles used in competition often are 15 feet (4.6 m) tall and weigh up to 15,000 pounds (6,800 kg). Some competitions enforce rules about the height of the header, tire standards, age of the contestants, and the location and contents of the gas tank. Most combines are given colorful nicknames by their owners. Many combine owners elaborately decorate their combines. Prizes are sometimes awarded for most impressively decorated combine. Though some competitions offer prizes of $1,500, it is expensive to modify and maintain the combines and some winners lose money overall.

Though the events are usually safe, during the 1999 event in Lind, one competitor suffered a broken leg after falling from his combine. This event led to more rules being enforced at the event, including a prohibition on concrete filled headers.

== Bibliography ==
Palahniuk, Chuck (2005). "Demolition". Stranger than Fiction: True Stories. Random House. ISBN 978-0-385-72222-3.
