= Commercial Historic District (Potlatch, Idaho) =

Historic district in Idaho, United States

- U.S. National Register of Historic Places
- U.S. Historic district
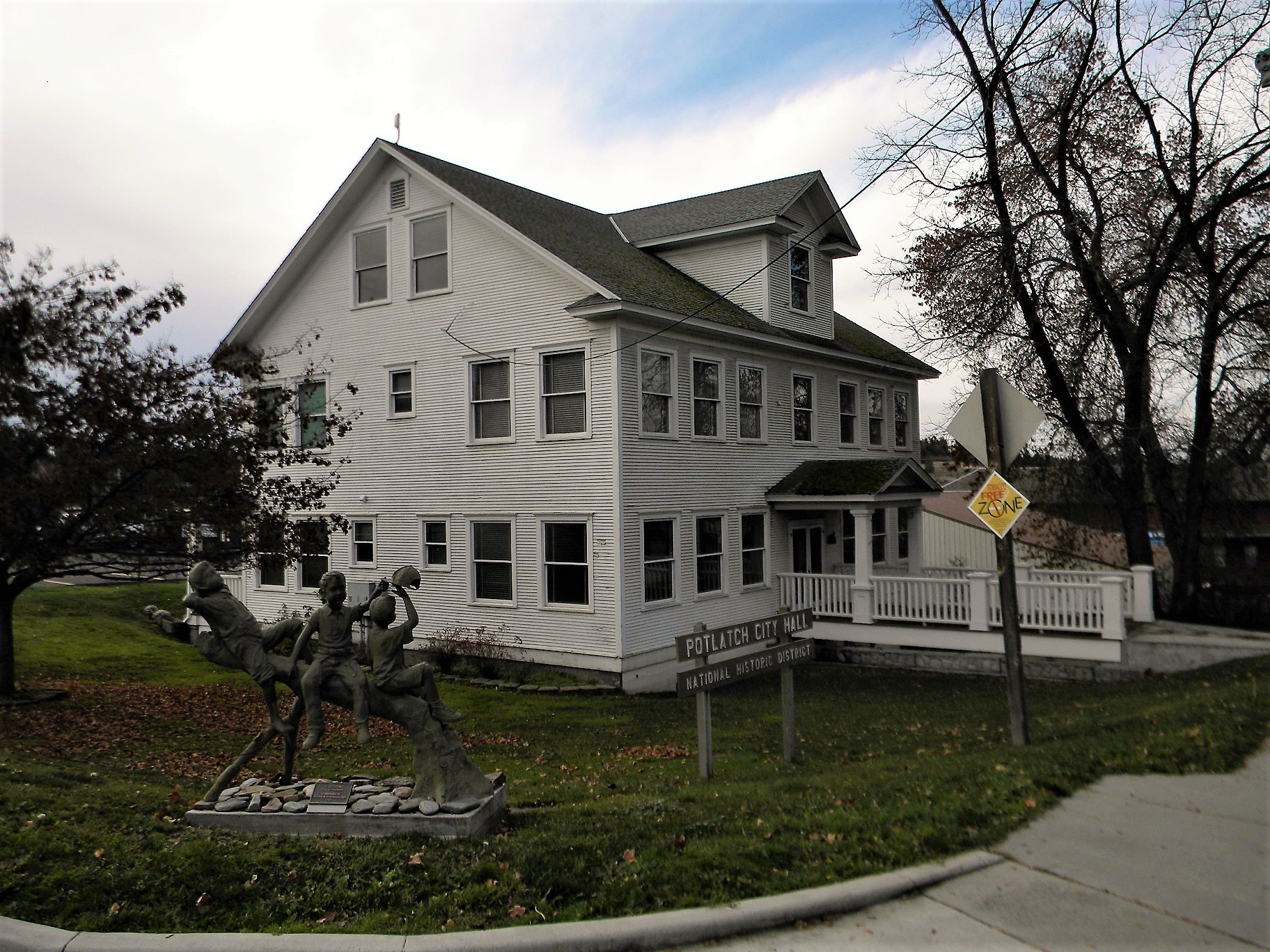
- Administration building / Potlatch City Hall

- Location within Idaho Location within the United States
- Location: Roughly Pine St. between Seventh and Fifth Sts., Potlatch, Idaho
- Coordinates: 46°55′17″N 116°54′04″W
- Area: 1 acre (0.40 ha)
- Built: 1906
- Architect: White, C. Ferris; Homes, AM
- MPS: Potlatch MRA
- NRHP reference No.: 86002201
- Added to NRHP: September 11, 1986

The Commercial Historic District in Potlatch, Idaho, United States, was listed on the National Register of Historic Places in 1986. In 1986, it included seven contributing buildings and a contributing object. It includes work by architect C. Ferris White and work by A.M. Homes.

It includes seven buildings of the administrative center of historic Potlatch, which was a company town of the Potlatch Lumber Company, plus some additional objects. Specifically, it includes:

- Washington. Idaho and Montana Railway Depot (1906), a two-story west-facing building, the first major building completed in Potlatch, designed by C. Ferris White

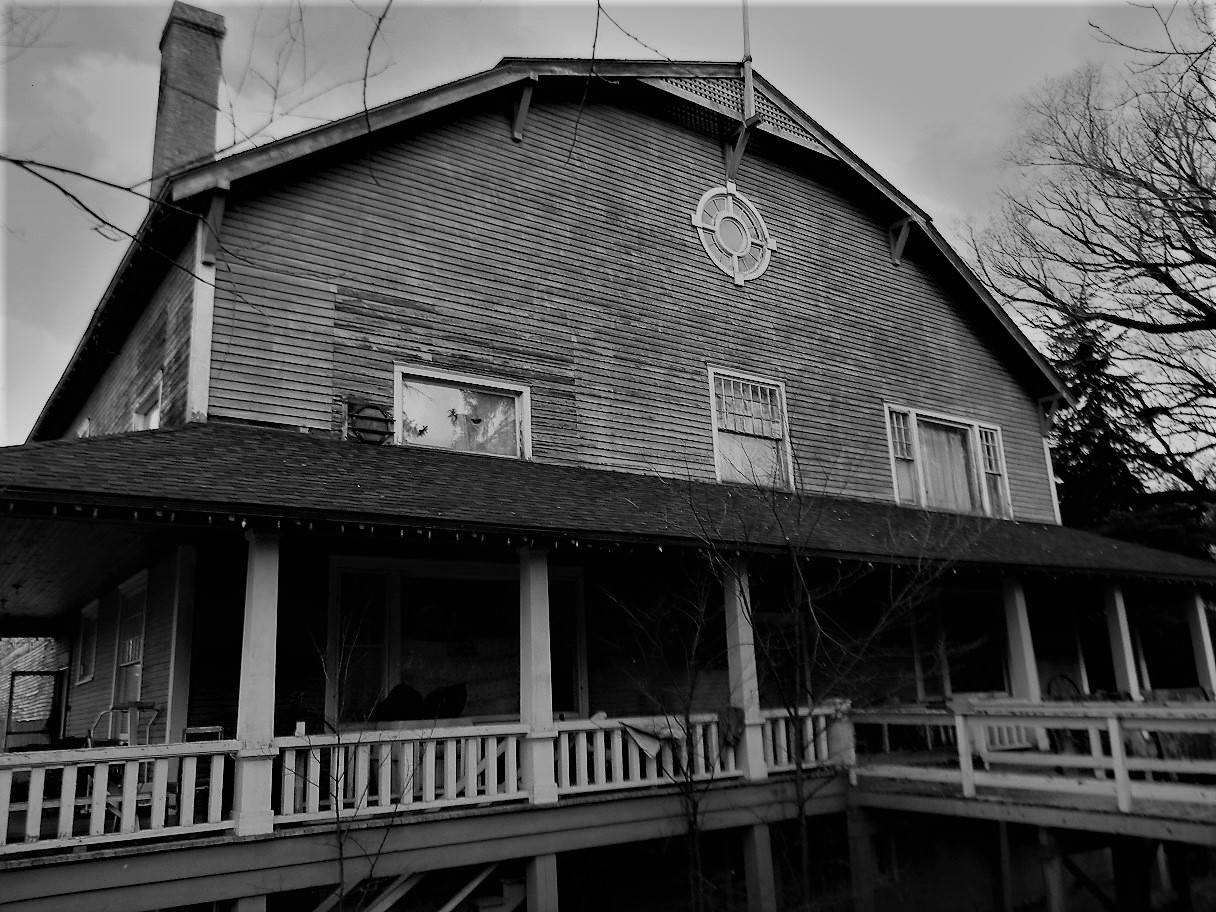
Gymnasium building

- Gymnasium building (1916), a two-story frame building designed by architect A. M. Holmes, the largest building in Potlatch. South facing, with a gambrel roof, it has an open porch on its east, south, and west sides supported by 16 Doric columns.
- Implement Store, a two-story frame building with a gambrel roof. Served as storage warehouse for the lumber company's Townsite Department, the maintenance department for the town.
- Administrative Office (1917), a two-and-one-half-story frame building which was the main administrative office building for the lumber company, and in the 1950s became city hall.
- Storage Building, a two-and-one-half-story building with a metal roof on a concrete foundation
- Produce Cellar (1910 or 1911), with capacity for 25 railroad carloads, a 40 feet (12 m) by 60 feet (18 m) structure built into the side of a hill, with brick walls and a metal gambrel roof.
- Creamery (probably 1906), a one-story building with a hipped metal roof, sided with clapboard, west-facing, adjacent to the depot building to its south.
- a large boulder monument to William Deary
- Engine 1 of the Washington, Idaho and Montana Railway.

The city of Potlatch offers a free walking tour guide, "A Walking Tour of the Potlatch Commercial District" at the city hall, at 195 6th Street. The guide is provided by the Potlatch Historical Society.

== See also ==
- National Register of Historic Places listings in Latah County, Idaho
