= Ritzville High School =

- U.S. National Register of Historic Places
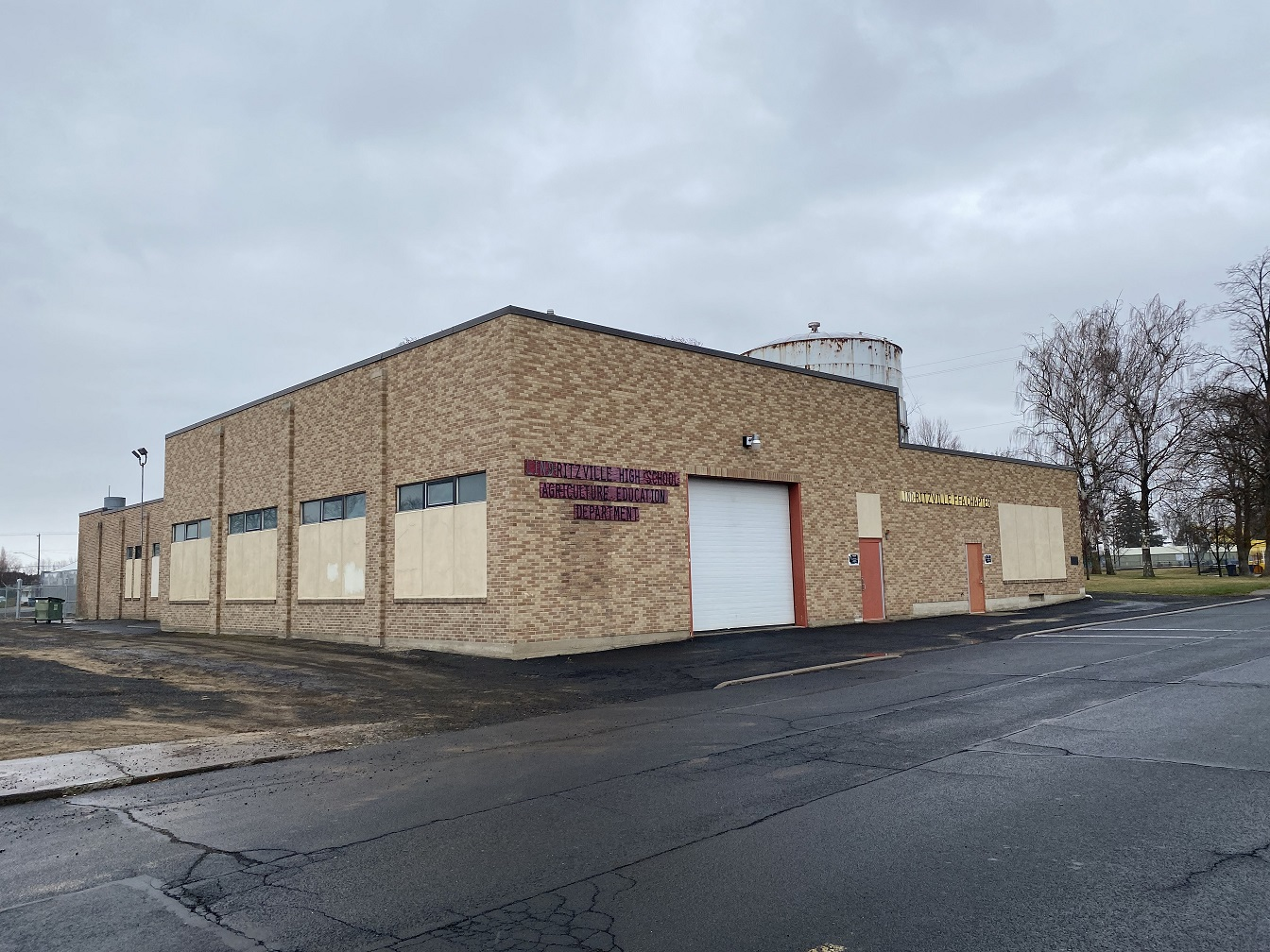
- Agriculture Education Building still standing at the site

- Location within Washington (state)
- Location: East 7th Avenue, between South Columbia Street and South Division Street, Ritzville, Washington
- Coordinates: 47°07′25″N 118°22′19″W
- Area: less than one acre
- Built: 1927
- Architect: George Melville Rasque
- Architectural style: Late Gothic Revival
- NRHP reference No.: 94000476
- Added to NRHP: May 19, 1994

Ritzville High School, also known as Old Ritzville High School, was a public high school located in Ritzville, Washington. It has been listed on the National Register of Historic Places in 1994. The building was abandoned in 1983 and its demolition was begun on August 17, 2013, and was completed a few days later.

The current Ritzville High School building is located nearby and is operated by the Ritzville School District. In 2012 it was merged with Lind High School to become Lind-Ritzville High School. In May 2013 it had an enrollment of 345 students.

== See also ==
- Loren G. McCollom
- National Register of Historic Places listings in Washington
