= PotlatchDeltic =

American diversified forest products company

PotlatchDeltic Corporation
- Type: Public
- Traded as: Nasdaq: PCH; S&P 400 Component
- Industry: Forestry; Real estate
- Founded: 1903; 123 years ago as Potlach Lumber
- Headquarters: Spokane, Washington
- Key people: Eric Cremers (CEO, president); Jerald Richards (CFO)
- Products: Lumber, Plywood
- Revenue: ▲$1.337 billion (2021)
- Operating income: ▲$551 million (2021)
- Net income: ▲$423 million (2021)
- Total assets: ▲$2.535 billion (2021)
- Total equity: ▲$1.526 billion (2021)
- Number of employees: 1,299 (2021)
- Subsidiaries: Potlatch TRS
- Website: potlatchdeltic.com

PotlatchDeltic Corporation (originally Potlatch Corp) is an American diversified forest products company based in Spokane, Washington.

It manufactures and sells lumber, panels and particleboard and receives revenue from other assets such as mineral rights and the leasing of land as well as the sale of land considered expendable. In February 2018, Potlatch acquired Deltic Timber Corp., a smaller Arkansas-based timber company. Following the merger, the company was renamed PotlatchDeltic Corporation. In 2021, the company harvested 5,515,000 tons of lumber. In 2022, PotlatchDeltic merged with CatchMark Timber Trust, Inc.

== History ==
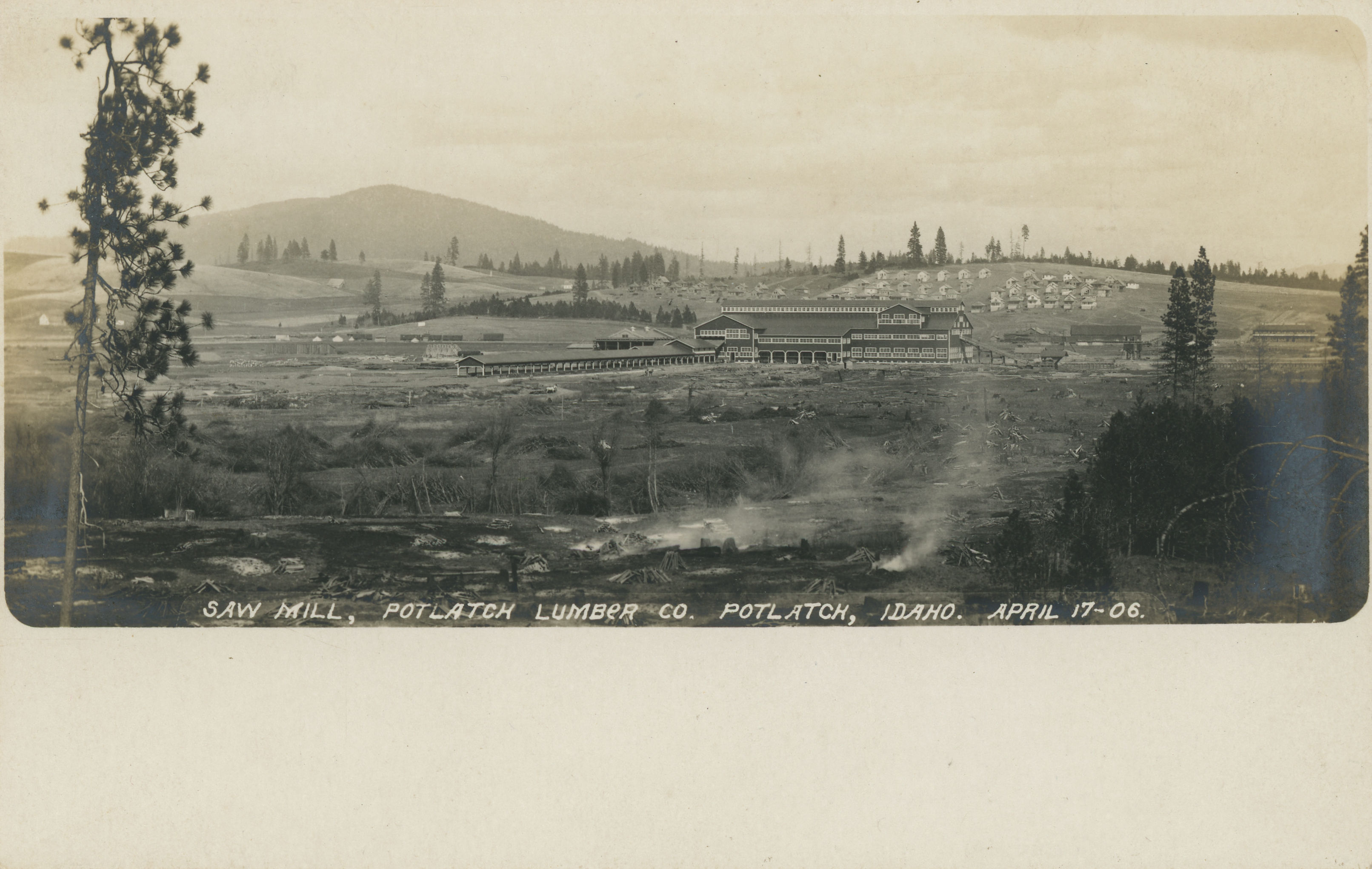
Sawmill in Potlatch, Idaho, in April 1906

=== Origins ===
The Potlatch Lumber Company was incorporated in 1903 with an authorized capital of $3.0 million by a consortium of lumber investors, including William Deary of Northland Pine Company, Henry Turrish of Wisconsin Log and Lumber, and Frederick Weyerhaeuser, who was also an investor in Deary's Northland Pine business. Frederick Weyerhaeuser's son Charles A. Weyerhaeuser became the company's first President and held that role until his death in 1930, while Deary was named the company's General Manager. Potlatch planned a lumber mill on the Palouse River in north central Idaho and began construction in 1905, completing it in 1906.

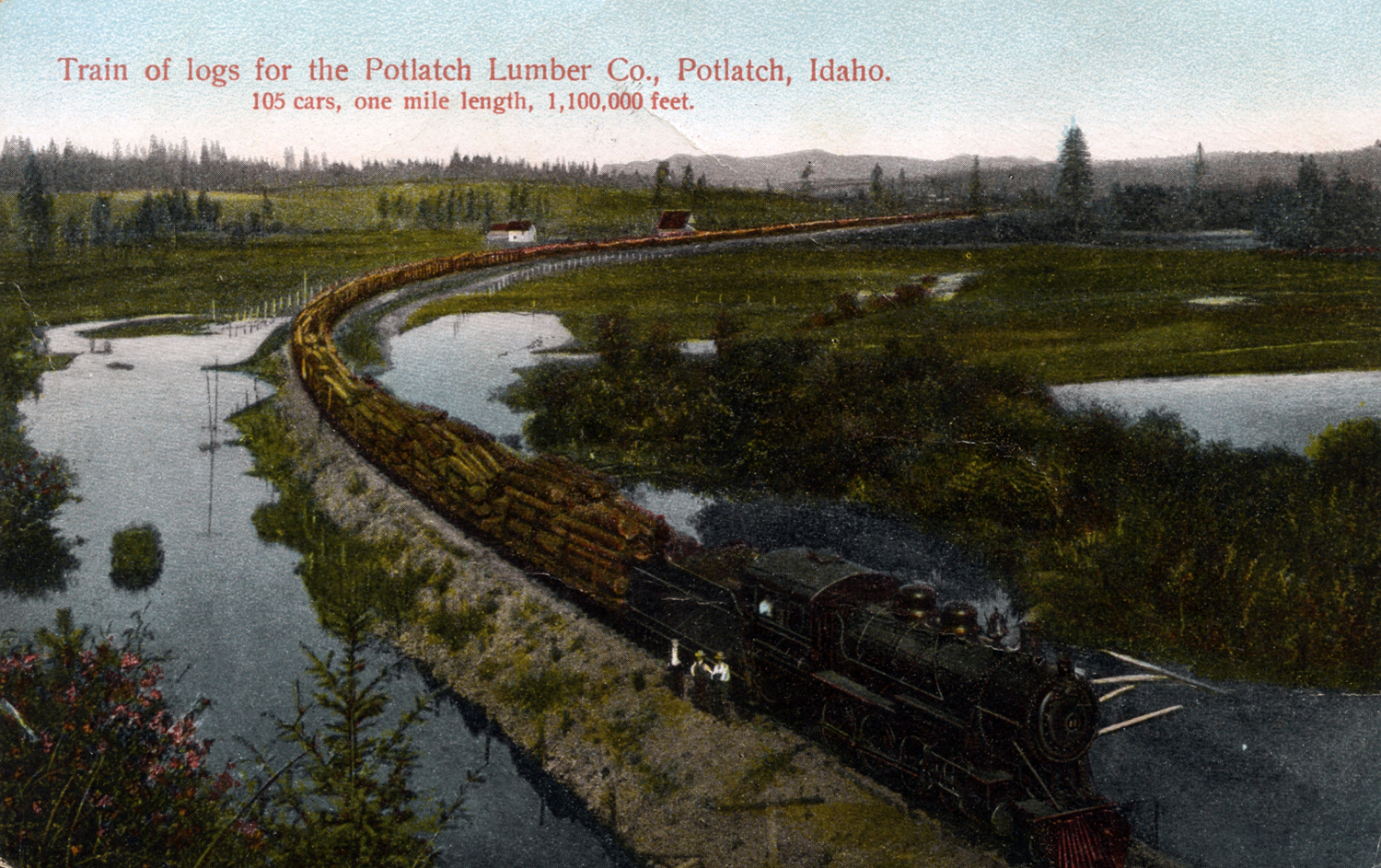
Log train outside Potlatch, circa 1907

The company town of Potlatch was built to serve the mill, and over 200 buildings were designed by architect C. Ferris White for the firm. The town soon became the second biggest in Latah County (behind Moscow), and the firm was the biggest taxpayer in Idaho for some years. Its commercial district, which includes the main administrative building of the company, was listed on the National Register of Historic Places in 1986. William Deary also oversaw the building of a logging railroad connecting the mill to the Milwaukee Road's Pacific Extension; the town of Deary, also in Latah County, was named after him.

In 1931, the company became Potlatch Forests, Inc. (PFI) after acquiring the operations of neighboring Clearwater Timber and Edward Rutledge Timber companies, which were facing financial difficulties as a result of lumber oversupply during the Great Depression. After the acquisitions, the company operated the original Potlatch mill as well as a sawmill in Elk River, Idaho (opened by Potlatch in 1907, closed in 1930), the Clearwater sawmill in Lewiston (opened in 1927), and the Rutledge sawmill in Coeur d'Alene (opened in 1916, closed in 1987).

=== Sustainable forest management ===
John Philip (Phil) Weyerhaeuser, Jr., nephew of Charles A. Weyerhaeuser, became president of PFI in 1931. Previously, as general manager of Clearwater Timber, he began the first program of sustainable forest management for timber as a crop in the United States. PFI continued this program and Phil Weyerhaeuser implemented it on a larger scale when he joined the family Weyerhaeuser Timber Company in 1933.

After Phil Weyerhaeuser's departure, C.L. Billings took over as PFI's general manager. During his tenure, which lasted until 1949, PFI continued to develop and practice sustained yield forest management in the Inland Northwest. PFI began paying out dividends in 1940.

=== Postwar expansion ===
PFI grew significantly during the postwar economic expansion, broadening its product portfolio and enlarging its manufacturing and sales footprint nationally. Notably:

- In 1950, PFI started up its first pulp and paperboard mill at the site of the Lewiston sawmill
- In 1953, PFI acquired a paper mill in Pomona, California, and entered the tissue business
- In 1958, PFI acquired Southern Lumber Company and Bradley Lumber Company, based in Warren, Arkansas
- In 1963, PFI began producing private label tissue products from its Lewiston mill
- In 1964, PFI acquired Northwest Paper Company, based in Cloquet, Minnesota
- In 1964, PFI moved its executive offices from Lewiston to San Francisco, California
- In 1968, PFI purchased a plywood plant in St. Maries, Idaho
- In 1973, PFI became Potlatch Corporation, reflecting its diversification and expansion
- In 1977, Potlatch built its second pulp and paperboard mill in Arkansas City, Arkansas, naming it the Cypress Bend Mill

=== Modern day ===
The Potlatch mill operated until mid-August 1981, and the company announced that mill closure would be permanent in 1983. In 1985, Canadian businessman Samuel Belzberg's First City Financial Corporation attempted a takeover of the company. Potlatch eventually bought back the corporation's 1.1 million shares, paying $8.1 million and ending the takeover bid. With the buyback, the stock returned to the control of the Weyerhaeuser family, the descendants of the original founder.

The Rutledge mill in Coeur d'Alene operated through October 1987; the site was acquired by Duane Hagadone the following year in a three-way land swap, and became the golf course (1991) of the Coeur d'Alene Resort. Its buildings were allowed to be burned in June 1988; local fire departments used it as a training exercise.

After 32 years in San Francisco, California, corporate headquarters of Potlatch were moved from One Maritime Plaza to downtown Spokane in 1997; from 1931 to 1965, the company was based in Idaho at Lewiston.

In March 2002, Potlatch sold its Cloquet, Minnesota, pulp and printing papers facilities and associated assets to Sappi Limited for $480 million. This sale marked its exit from the coated printing papers business. Sappi closed the coated paper plant in Brainerd, MN and moved the production to its own plants in Maine at Skowhegan and Westbrook.

In 2006, Potlatch restructured to form a real estate investment trust (REIT). In this restructuring all of the company's manufacturing operations are held by a wholly owned subsidiary, allowing the company to refocus on managing their large land holdings in Oregon, Idaho, Minnesota, and Arkansas.

In February 2018, Potlatch acquired Deltic Timber Corp., a smaller Arkansas-based timber company. Following the merger, the company was renamed PotlatchDeltic Corporation. The merged companies owned 2 million acres of timber in total.

In October 2025, Potlatch and Rayonier agreed to a "merger of equals" in an all-stock deal that would create a $7.1 billion forestry company. The combined entity is expected to own roughly 4.2 million acres of timberland in the US—second only to Weyerhaeuser.

== Properties ==
The company owns 2,100,000 acres (3,300 sq mi; 8,500 km^{2}) of timberland in rural Alabama, Arkansas, Georgia, Idaho, Louisiana, Mississippi, and South Carolina. Its forest products are processed at seven company-owned facilities.

== Spin-off of Clearwater Paper ==
In 2008, Clearwater Paper Corporation, previously a subsidiary of Potlatch, was created on December 9 via a spin-off with headquarters in Spokane; Gordon L. Jones, a vice-president of Potlatch, was the new company's president and CEO.

Shares of Clearwater Paper (NYSE:CLW) stock were distributed to Potlatch shareholders at a ratio of 1 share of Clearwater stock for every 3.5 shares of Potlatch stock held, with fractional shares paid in cash. Clearwater stock began trading on December 16, 2008.

In August 2012, since Clearwater Paper's stock had failed to rise, the company prepared to split in two and sell one or both businesses.
