= Lind, Washington =

Lind
- Town
- Lind, Washington
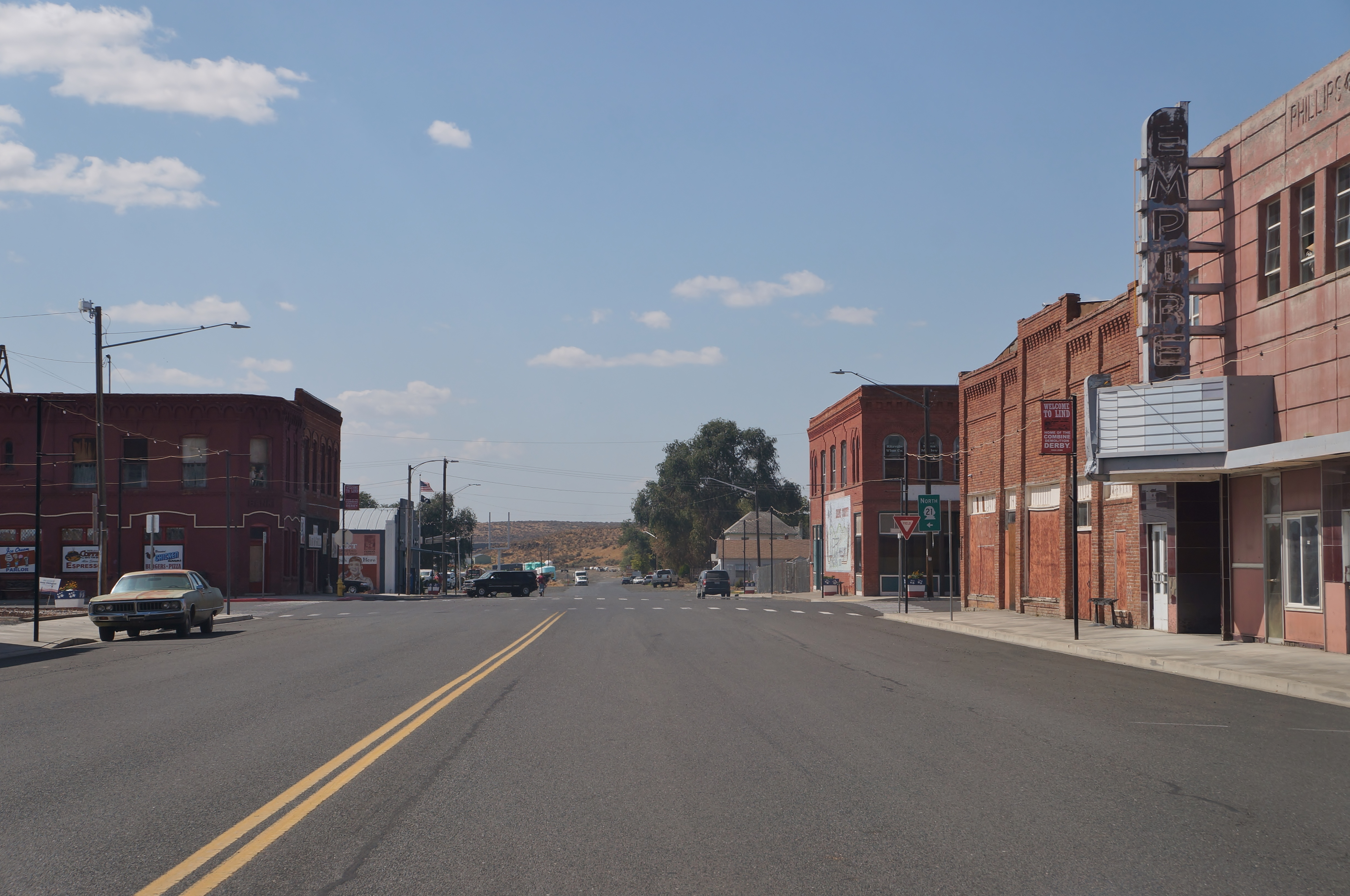
- East 2nd Avenue in Lind

- Location of Lind, Washington
- Coordinates: 46°58′12″N 118°37′30″W
- Country: United States
- State: Washington
- County: Adams

Government
  - Type: Mayor–council
  - Mayor: Paula Bell

Area
  - Total: 1.10 sq mi (2.86 km^{2})
  - Land: 1.10 sq mi (2.86 km^{2})
  - Water: 0 sq mi (0.00 km^{2})
- Elevation: 1,362 ft (415 m)

Population (2020)
  - Total: 535
  - Density: 509.7/sq mi (196.81/km^{2})
- Time zone: UTC-8 (Pacific (PST))
  - Summer (DST): UTC-7 (PDT)
- ZIP code: 99341
- Area code: 509
- FIPS code: 53-39510
- GNIS feature ID: 2412899
- Website: lindwa.com

Lind is a town in Adams County, Washington, United States. The population was 535 at the 2020 census, a 5.1% decrease over the preceding census.

== History ==
Lind was first settled in 1888 on a relatively barren area along the Northern Pacific Railway's main line by the Neilson Brothers, James and Dugal. The site had previously been selected in 1881 for a station (an old boxcar) and section house and was named Lind by the railroad although the exact origin of that name has been lost. In the autumn of 1888 the Neilson Brothers built the first Lind residence and two years later they built and stocked a store and resumed postal service which until then had been processed in Ritzville and tossed off in town by passing trains. James Neilson became the first postmaster. The first school opened in 1889 with six students in attendance. The Neilson Brothers platted the town site on June 7, 1890, which consisted of only four square blocks. The Panic of 1893 would stave off any further development of the town site until the turn of the century.

By 1899 the panic was starting to wear off and the local wheat crop, of high quality, was growing in demand. Lind began to expand in size. A new post office and saloon were built and a lumber yard was started and by the end of the year, the population was nearing 100. By the end of 1901, several brick buildings were being constructed for a bank and other stores and hundreds of temporary dwellings were constructed by settlers. A new school and three churches were built. Between 1898 and 1903, Lind grew immensely to a population of about 600 and saw the opening of many more stores, restaurants, a second bank, real estate offices and a newspaper, The Lind Leader. Lind was incorporated on January 26, 1902. Dugal Neilson was elected mayor while his brother James was elected treasurer.

The Milwaukee Road would later lay its tracks through the south side of town, which is now the John Wayne Pioneer Trail.

When the Neilson brothers platted the town site of Lind, they named all of the north to south streets to eventually spell out their surname. The town only grew large enough to spell "Neilso".

The local Jr./Sr. High School has changed mascots many times some of which are Lind Bulldogs, Lind-Kahlotus Blue Devils, Lind-Ritzville Broncos, and the current Lind-Ritzville-Sprague Broncos which is classified as a 2B school according to the WIAA. Old time rival the Rearden Indians has been kept, but due to the great success with the local football program, it has been the very challenging Colfax Bulldogs. Also, due to state funding, the local high school will move to the nearby town of Ritzville, WA. The middle school remains at Lind as same with Ritzville.

On August 4, 2022, the entire town was ordered to evacuate due to an approaching wildfire, which destroyed 10 homes. Local highways were also shut down while firefighters moved into the area to control the wildfire.

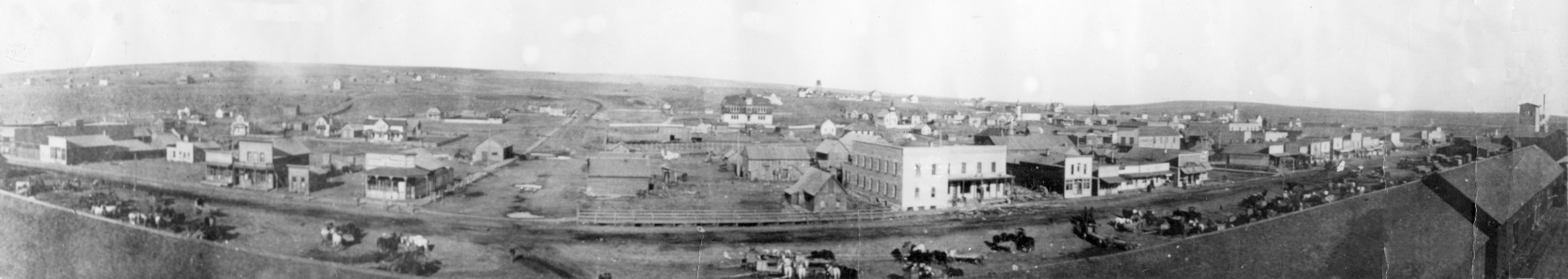
Lind, 1906

== Geography ==
Lind is located near the geographical center of Adams County. It is situated within the shallow Lind Coulee, which forms part of the border between a rich agricultural region and the Channeled Scablands and just east of where the Paha and McElroy Coulees branch off to the north. Lind is located 5 miles west of Highway 395 where it intersects with Lind - Ralston and Lind - Kahlotus road, officially known as SR 21, in an area known as East Lind on maps, located at the base of the Paha Coulee. from the east, SR 21 passes through the center of town by becoming East 2nd Avenue then turning left on to North I Street then right onto North 1st Street. As the highway turns north, Lind - Hatton and Lind - Warden Roads branch off to the west.

According to the United States Census Bureau, the town has a total area of 1.07 square miles (2.77 km^{2}), all of it land.

=== Climate ===
According to the Köppen Climate Classification system, Lind has a semi-arid climate, abbreviated "BSk" on climate maps.

Climate data for Lind, Washington (1991–2020 normals, extremes 1931–present)
Month	Jan	Feb	Mar	Apr	May	Jun	Jul	Aug	Sep	Oct	Nov	Dec	Year
Record high °F (°C)	62 (17)	67 (19)	76 (24)	92 (33)	100 (38)	114 (46)	111 (44)	113 (45)	102 (39)	91 (33)	72 (22)	62 (17)	114 (46)
Mean daily maximum °F (°C)	37.8 (3.2)	44.3 (6.8)	54.0 (12.2)	62.5 (16.9)	72.4 (22.4)	79.2 (26.2)	89.2 (31.8)	88.2 (31.2)	78.6 (25.9)	62.9 (17.2)	46.6 (8.1)	36.7 (2.6)	62.7 (17.1)
Daily mean °F (°C)	32.1 (0.1)	36.6 (2.6)	43.5 (6.4)	49.7 (9.8)	57.8 (14.3)	64.0 (17.8)	71.9 (22.2)	71.2 (21.8)	62.7 (17.1)	50.3 (10.2)	38.8 (3.8)	31.3 (−0.4)	50.8 (10.4)
Mean daily minimum °F (°C)	26.5 (−3.1)	28.9 (−1.7)	33.0 (0.6)	36.9 (2.7)	43.1 (6.2)	48.7 (9.3)	54.6 (12.6)	54.2 (12.3)	46.8 (8.2)	37.7 (3.2)	31.0 (−0.6)	25.8 (−3.4)	38.9 (3.8)
Record low °F (°C)	−26 (−32)	−22 (−30)	1 (−17)	11 (−12)	20 (−7)	29 (−2)	32 (0)	32 (0)	22 (−6)	4 (−16)	−16 (−27)	−20 (−29)	−26 (−32)
Average precipitation inches (mm)	1.29 (33)	0.88 (22)	1.05 (27)	0.83 (21)	0.86 (22)	0.69 (18)	0.34 (8.6)	0.24 (6.1)	0.34 (8.6)	0.92 (23)	1.29 (33)	1.40 (36)	10.13 (257)
Average snowfall inches (cm)	6.5 (17)	2.0 (5.1)	0.7 (1.8)	0.1 (0.25)	0.0 (0.0)	0.0 (0.0)	0.0 (0.0)	0.0 (0.0)	0.0 (0.0)	0.0 (0.0)	1.1 (2.8)	4.2 (11)	14.6 (37)
Average precipitation days (≥ 0.01 in)	11.0	8.0	8.1	6.8	6.5	4.9	2.1	2.0	2.9	6.7	11.1	11.1	81.2
Average snowy days (≥ 0.1 in)	3.3	1.8	0.6	0.1	0.0	0.0	0.0	0.0	0.0	0.0	1.0	4.0	10.8
Source: NOAA

== Demographics ==
Historical population
Census	Pop.	Note	%±
1910	831		—
1920	724		−12.9%
1930	730		0.8%
1940	679		−7.0%
1950	796		17.2%
1960	697		−12.4%
1970	622		−10.8%
1980	567		−8.8%
1990	472		−16.8%
2000	582		23.3%
2010	564		−3.1%
2020	535		−5.1%
U.S. Decennial Census

=== 2020 census ===
As of the census of 2020 there were 535 people, 182 households, and 108 families residing in the town. The population density was 478.9 inhabitants per square mile (184.9/km^{2}). The racial makeup of the town was 86.6% White, 0.8% Native American, and 12.6% from two or more races.

There were 182 households, of which 31.3% had children under the age of 18 living with them, 37.9% were married couples living together, 21.4% had a male householder with no spouse present, and 40.7% were non-families. 26.9% of all households were made up of individuals, and 12.1% had someone living alone who was 65 years of age or older. The average household size was 2.8 and the average family size was 3.12.

The median age in the town was 32.4 years. 24.8% of residents were under the age of 18; 11.6% were between the ages of 18 and 24; 21.2% were from 25 to 44; 30.6% were from 45 to 64; and 11.8% were 65 years of age or older. The gender makeup of the town was 47.9% male and 52.1% female.

=== 2010 census ===
As of the 2010 census, there were 564 people, 234 households, and 151 families residing in the town. The population density was 527.1 inhabitants per square mile (203.5/km^{2}). There were 276 housing units at an average density of 257.9 per square mile (99.6/km^{2}). The racial makeup of the town was 87.9% White, 1.6% African American, 1.4% Asian, 6.4% from other races, and 2.7% from two or more races. Hispanic or Latino of any race were 11.2% of the population.

There were 234 households, of which 28.2% had children under the age of 18 living with them, 46.6% were married couples living together, 13.2% had a female householder with no husband present, 4.7% had a male householder with no wife present, and 35.5% were non-families. 29.1% of all households were made up of individuals, and 13.7% had someone living alone who was 65 years of age or older. The average household size was 2.41 and the average family size was 2.98.

The median age in the town was 43.1 years. 24.1% of residents were under the age of 18; 9.6% were between the ages of 18 and 24; 18.6% were from 25 to 44; 29.5% were from 45 to 64; and 18.1% were 65 years of age or older. The gender makeup of the town was 51.2% male and 48.8% female.

=== 2000 census ===
As of the 2000 census, there were 582 people, 230 households, and 161 families residing in the town. The population density was 566.3 people per square mile (218.2/km^{2}). There were 307 housing units at an average density of 298.7 per square mile (115.1/km^{2}). The racial makeup of the town was 90.89% White, 0.52% Native American, 0.17% Asian, 7.22% from other races, and 1.20% from two or more races. Hispanic or Latino of any race were 11.86% of the population.

There were 230 households, out of which 33.9% had children under the age of 18 living with them, 57.0% were married couples living together, 8.7% had a female householder with no husband present, and 29.6% were non-families. 27.0% of all households were made up of individuals, and 13.9% had someone living alone who was 65 years of age or older. The average household size was 2.53 and the average family size was 3.05.

In the town, the age distribution of the population shows 29.6% under the age of 18, 4.5% from 18 to 24, 26.3% from 25 to 44, 22.7% from 45 to 64, and 17.0% who were 65 years of age or older. The median age was 38 years. For every 100 females, there were 100.0 males. For every 100 females age 18 and over, there were 91.6 males.

The median income for a household in the town was $40,147, and the median income for a family was $40,938. Males had a median income of $33,625 versus $18,000 for females. The per capita income for the town was $16,948. About 8.2% of families and 11.5% of the population were below the poverty line, including 18.3% of those under age 18 and 4.1% of those age 65 or over.

== Arts and culture ==
Lind is the home of a combine demolition derby that is held annually in June. It has received much publicity over the past couple years when it was featured in Playboy's 50th Year Anniversary Special Edition issue, Discovery Channel, the movie "Always", Hamish and Andy (Australia), ESPN, KHQ's "The Derby", and also in Stranger Than Fiction: True Stories by Chuck Palahniuk. It has also been featured on CMT. Lind also is surrounded by fields of wheat. About half are owned by Russian-German Mennonite and Hutterites farmers.
