= National Register of Historic Places listings in Washington =

National Register of Historic Places listings in Washington may refer to:

- National Register of Historic Places listings in Washington state
- National Register of Historic Places listings in Washington, D.C.
