= Ritzville, Washington =

- City
- City of Ritzville
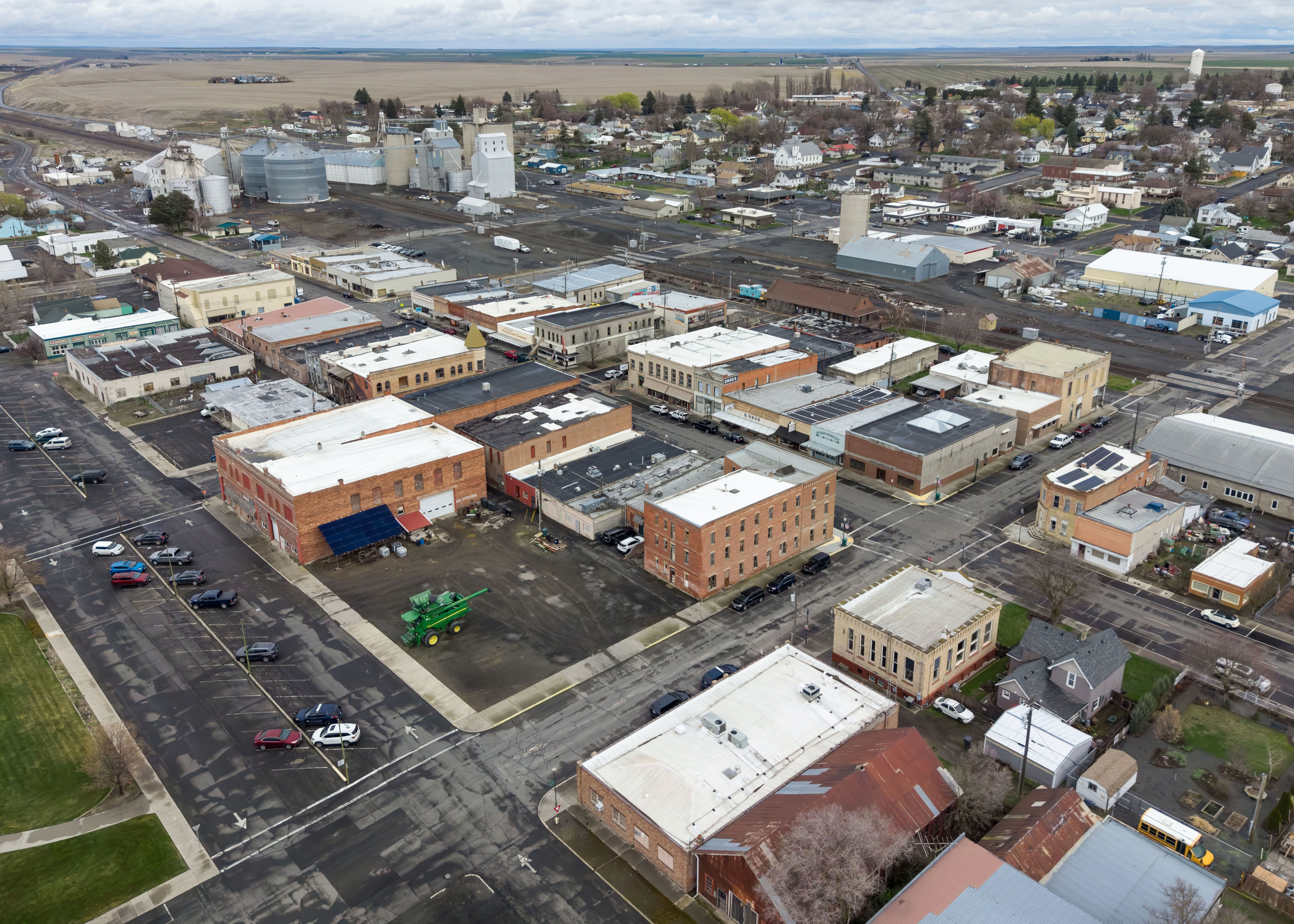
- Downtown Ritzville

- Location of Ritzville, Washington
- Coordinates: 47°7′35″N 118°22′30″W
- Country: United States
- State: Washington
- County: Adams

Government
  - Type: Mayor–council
  - Mayor: Scott Yaeger

Area
  - Total: 1.75 sq mi (4.53 km^{2})
  - Land: 1.75 sq mi (4.53 km^{2})
  - Water: 0 sq mi (0.00 km^{2})
- Elevation: 1,860 ft (570 m)

Population (2020)
  - Total: 1,767
  - Density: 1,010/sq mi (390/km^{2})
- Time zone: UTC-8 (Pacific (PST))
  - Summer (DST): UTC-7 (PDT)
- ZIP code: 99169
- Area code: 509
- FIPS code: 53-58725
- GNIS feature ID: 2410959
- Website: City of Ritzville

Ritzville (/ˈrɪtsvɪl/) is a city in Adams County, Washington, United States. The population was 1,767 at the 2020 census. It is the county seat of Adams County. The city is part of the Othello, WA Micropolitan Area, which comprises all of Adams County, and is part of the larger Moses Lake-Othello, WA Combined Statistical Area.

== History ==
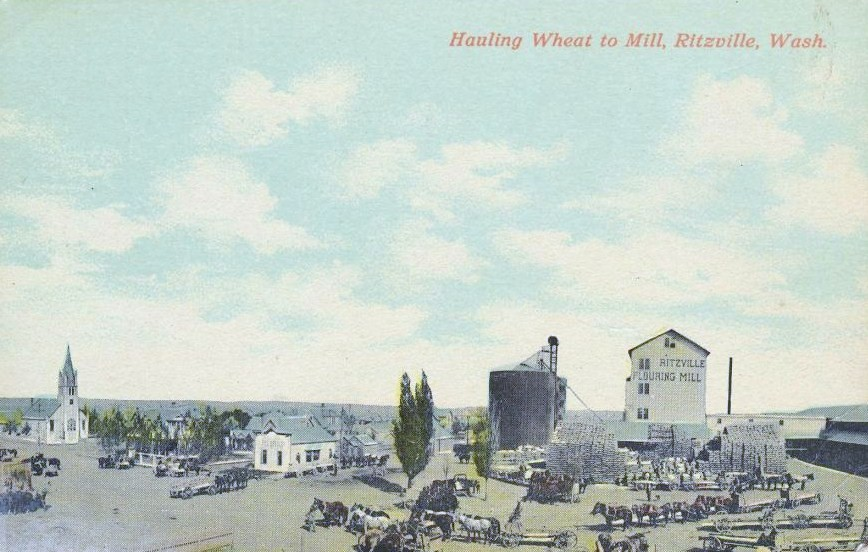
Hauling Wheat to Mill, Ritzville c. 1908

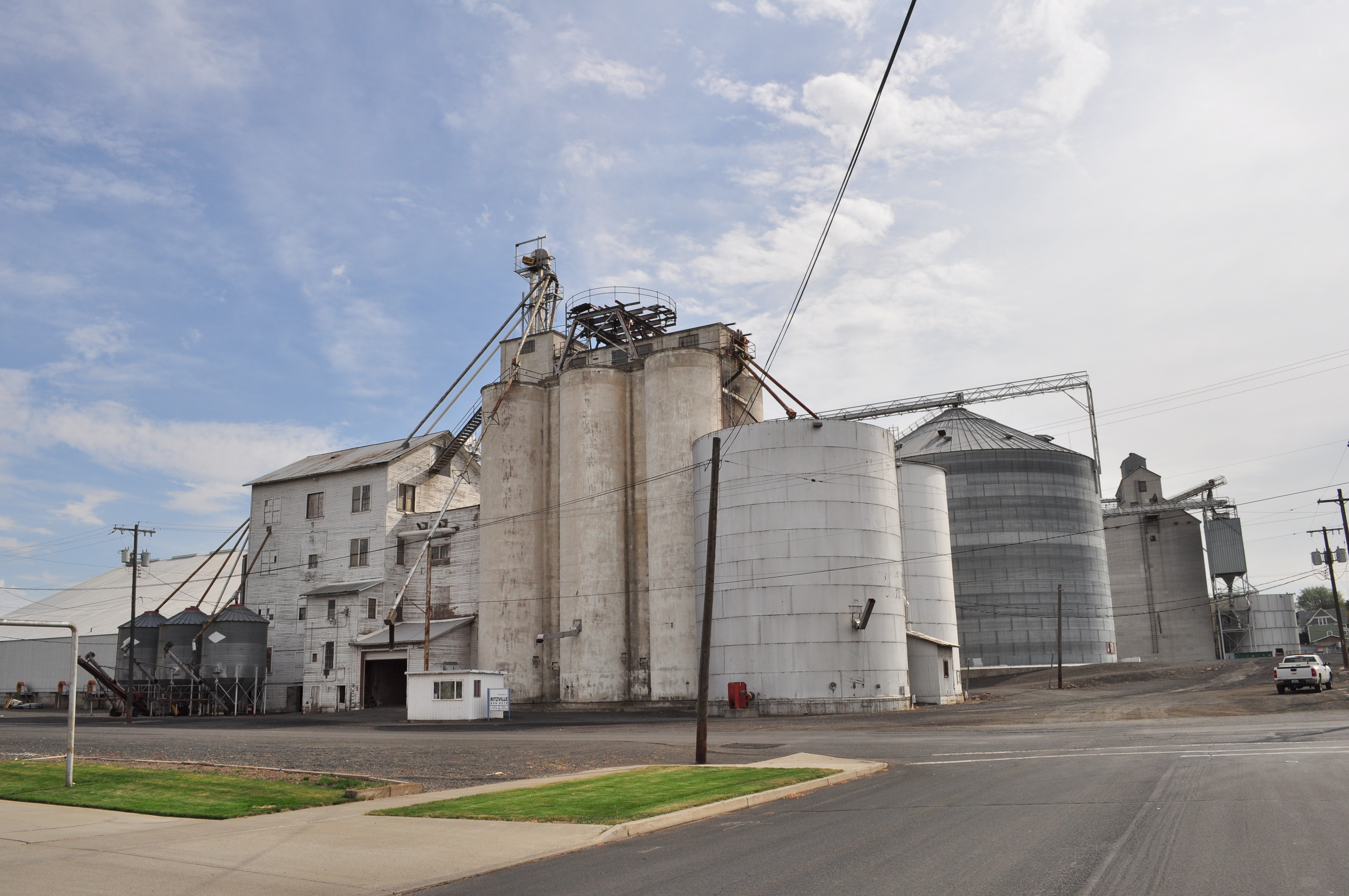
Grain elevator, 2014. Wheat remains the key to Ritzville's economy.

The first settler in what would become modern Ritzville was William McKay in 1880. The town was named, however, after Phillip Ritz, who had settled south of modern Ritzville two years earlier. Ritz had come to Walla Walla in 1861 and established a large orchard just outside of town known as Ritz, which consisted of over 100,000 trees of all types, including many fruit trees and shrubbery. Starting in 1866, he worked extensively to establish a second transcontinental railroad. His orchard business entailed many trips across the country by wagon, these trips gave him great political contact and influence.

By December 1880, Ritzville's townsite had been platted by John W. Sprague on behalf of his company, The Northern Pacific Railway. In 1881, McKay built the first house on the townsite. The Northern Pacific grade was under construction in the vicinity, and McKay's home was used as a makeshift hotel for the workers and associated transients.

With the railroad came a new wave of settlers to the area. In the summer of 1881, McKay erected the first store, and the railroad built a depot nearby, which also served as a hotel, theater, and meeting hall. At that time, the fledgling village had a population of around 50, and the school consisted of a lean-to against a house. The town's water supply was the railroad tank because it was not thought that water could be found in the ground. The first religious services in Adams County were held in Ritzville in April 1882 at the McKay Home, and the First Congregational Church was soon organized. A church was built in 1885. The post office was established in 1883 by J.L. Johnson of Walla Walla. He also purchased McKay's store. Soon afterwards, many more businesses were founded. The town had begun to establish itself as a significant wheat shipping center within the Big Bend Country, and its growth continued steadily throughout the decade.

As the town's reliance on the railroad water tank became unsustainable, efforts were undertaken to locate an underground water source. Initial attempts were unsuccessful; however, a viable well was eventually discovered approximately 1-mile (1.6 km) east of the original town site. In response, most property owners agreed to relocate closer to the new water source, except for a large hotel, which was not feasible to move. Subsequently, water was also located at the original site, allowing the town to remain in place. By 1887, Ritzville supported a growing commercial and civic infrastructure, including three general merchandise stores, one drugstore, one saloon, two blacksmith shops, two lumber yards, two livery stables, one harness shop, two hotels, and a large two-story wooden schoolhouse serving approximately 100 students.

On June 6, 1888, a fire caused by a defective flue wiped out nearly all of the business section of town. Ritzville had no fire department at the time, and its citizens were unable to combat the flames effectively. Rebuilding got underway quickly, resulting in the town's first brick building in 1889, built by the town's first mayor, N.H. Greene. It still stands and is currently part of the Ritzville Historic District.

Following the rebuilding from the fire, Ritzville was incorporated as a town in 1888 and was officially re-incorporated as a city on July 17, 1890, after Washington became a state. The first banking institution, The Adams County Bank (later First National Bank), would follow in April 1891. After another downtown fire in 1894, a waterworks system was installed at a cost of $20,000. The first permanent Adams County courthouse was also built in 1892.

After the Panic of 1893 had subsided in 1898, Ritzville was experiencing another boom, with demand for property rising and scores of buildings being built. Telephone service was established in August 1899. By the turn of the century, the population had exceeded 1,200. The town finally received a volunteer fire department in 1901, with equipment funded by the citizens. Also in 1901, Ritzville received the title of the greatest wheat shipping point in the world. Between August of that year and August 1902, approximately 1,967,725 bushels of wheat were received in Ritzville warehouses for shipment, and 1,990 rail cars of wheat and flour were billed out. These numbers would only be exceeded in 1902. On January 17, 1902, Ritzville was electrified for the first time, run by a steam-powered dynamo.

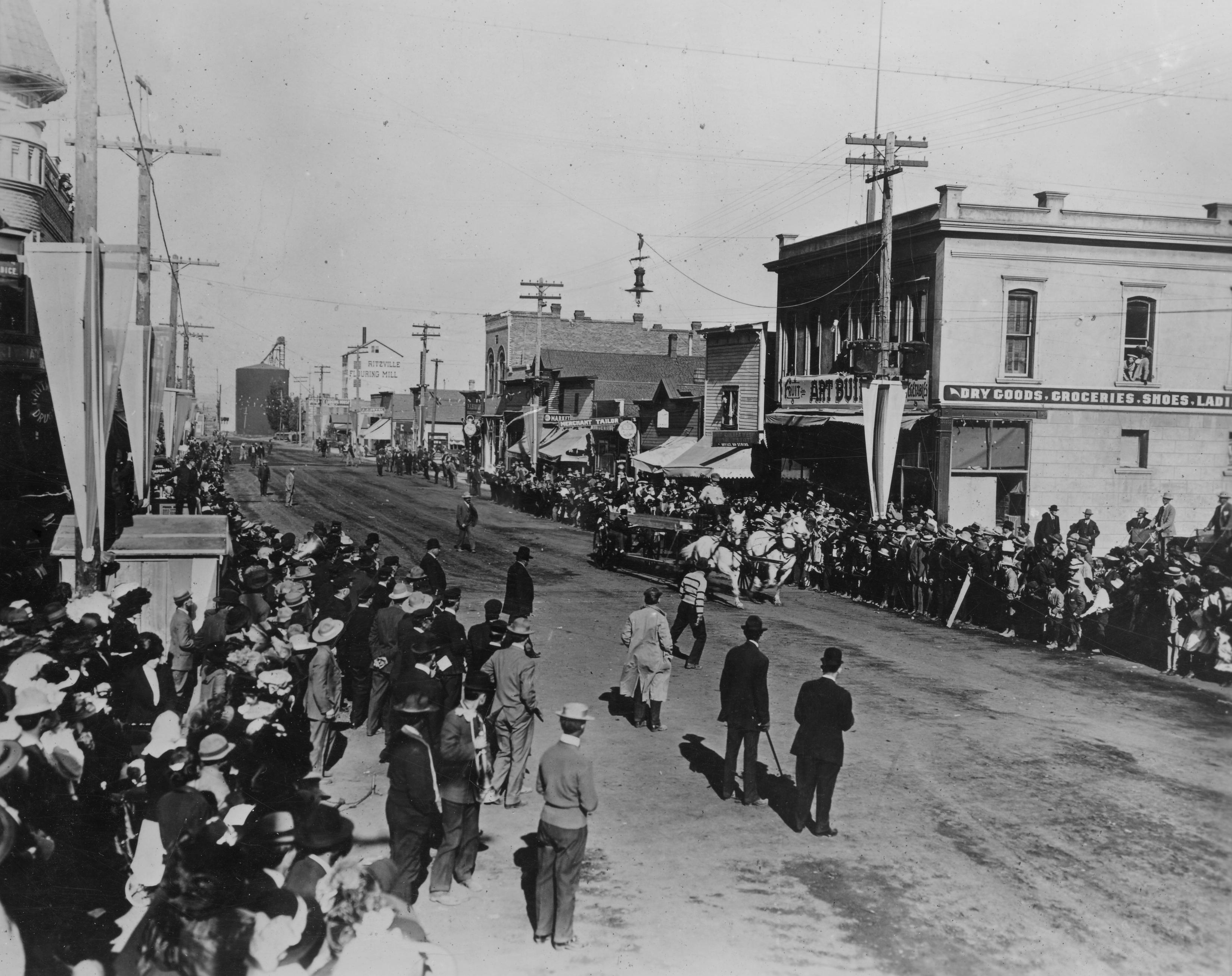
Parade, circa 1913.

A chamber of commerce was formed in 1903, and the following year, the courthouse was doubled in size. The city received a Carnegie library in 1907, the only one in Adams County. It still serves as the town's library today. By the time of The Great Depression, growth had slowed, and Ritzville settled in as a small town.

In the 1960s, Interstate 90 was constructed around the south end of town, replacing U.S. Route 10 and re-routing U.S. Route 395 and its traffic away from downtown. The town's arrested development from then on preserved it and formed the core of the designated Ritzville Historic District in 1990.

== Geography ==
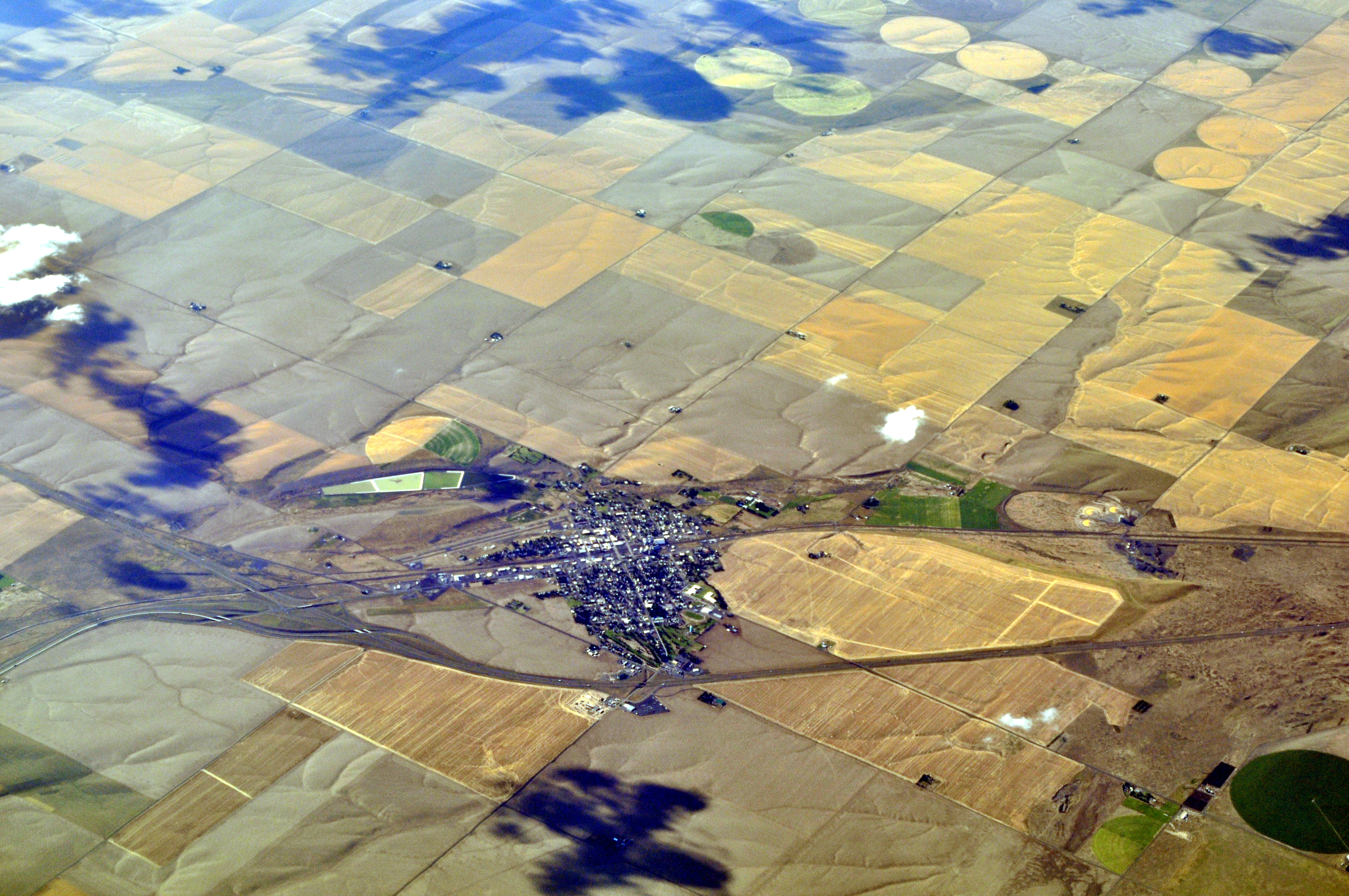
Aerial view of Ritzville, 2013

Ritzville is located along Paha Creek at the northern end of the Paha Coulee, approximately 53 miles (85 km) southwest of Spokane on Interstate 90 / U.S. Route 395. According to the United States Census Bureau, the city has a total area of 1.70 square miles (4.40 km^{2}), all of it land.

=== Climate ===
Ritzville experiences a semi-arid climate (Köppen BSk). Annual precipitation averages 11.9 in (30.2 cm). The average temperature in January is 27 °F (−3 °C), and in July it is 69 °F (21 °C). Annual snowfall averages just under 20 inches (50 cm).

Climate data for Ritzville, Washington (1991–2020 normals, extremes 1916–present)
Month	Jan	Feb	Mar	Apr	May	Jun	Jul	Aug	Sep	Oct	Nov	Dec	Year
Record high °F (°C)	60 (16)	66 (19)	77 (25)	92 (33)	99 (37)	110 (43)	111 (44)	112 (44)	103 (39)	93 (34)	70 (21)	62 (17)	112 (44)
Mean daily maximum °F (°C)	35.8 (2.1)	41.8 (5.4)	51.0 (10.6)	59.7 (15.4)	69.1 (20.6)	76.2 (24.6)	86.7 (30.4)	86.1 (30.1)	76.6 (24.8)	61.5 (16.4)	45.2 (7.3)	35.2 (1.8)	60.4 (15.8)
Daily mean °F (°C)	29.8 (−1.2)	33.9 (1.1)	40.4 (4.7)	46.7 (8.2)	55.2 (12.9)	61.5 (16.4)	70.1 (21.2)	69.7 (20.9)	61.4 (16.3)	49.0 (9.4)	36.9 (2.7)	29.3 (−1.5)	48.7 (9.3)
Mean daily minimum °F (°C)	23.9 (−4.5)	25.9 (−3.4)	29.8 (−1.2)	33.8 (1.0)	41.3 (5.2)	46.8 (8.2)	53.4 (11.9)	53.3 (11.8)	46.1 (7.8)	36.4 (2.4)	28.7 (−1.8)	23.4 (−4.8)	36.9 (2.7)
Record low °F (°C)	−23 (−31)	−24 (−31)	0 (−18)	11 (−12)	21 (−6)	29 (−2)	33 (1)	32 (0)	20 (−7)	5 (−15)	−14 (−26)	−21 (−29)	−24 (−31)
Average precipitation inches (mm)	1.64 (42)	1.12 (28)	1.33 (34)	0.96 (24)	1.19 (30)	0.89 (23)	0.41 (10)	0.32 (8.1)	0.43 (11)	1.08 (27)	1.58 (40)	1.80 (46)	12.75 (324)
Average snowfall inches (cm)	5.9 (15)	1.9 (4.8)	1.2 (3.0)	0.1 (0.25)	0.0 (0.0)	0.0 (0.0)	0.0 (0.0)	0.0 (0.0)	0.0 (0.0)	0.0 (0.0)	2.4 (6.1)	4.2 (11)	15.7 (40)
Average precipitation days (≥ 0.01 in)	12.0	9.0	9.3	7.8	7.4	5.9	2.5	2.7	3.7	7.1	11.4	11.9	90.7
Average snowy days (≥ 0.1 in)	4.7	2.2	1.0	0.1	0.0	0.0	0.0	0.0	0.0	0.0	2.0	4.8	14.8
Source: NOAA

== Demographics ==
Historical population
Census	Pop.	Note	%±
1900	761		—
1910	1,859		144.3%
1920	1,900		2.2%
1930	1,777		−6.5%
1940	1,748		−1.6%
1950	2,145		22.7%
1960	2,173		1.3%
1970	1,876		−13.7%
1980	1,800		−4.1%
1990	1,725		−4.2%
2000	1,736		0.6%
2010	1,673		−3.6%
2020	1,767		5.6%
U.S. Decennial Census

=== 2020 census ===
As of the 2020 census, Ritzville had a population of 1,767. The median age was 45.2 years, with 20.4% of residents under the age of 18 and 24.2% 65 years of age or older. For every 100 females there were 104.5 males, and for every 100 females age 18 and over there were 102.6 males age 18 and over.

The 2020 census reported 0.0% of residents lived in urban areas, while 100.0% lived in rural areas.

The 2020 census counted 778 households in Ritzville, of which 26.7% had children under the age of 18 living in them. Of all households, 41.3% were married-couple households, 23.9% were households with a male householder and no spouse or partner present, and 28.1% were households with a female householder and no spouse or partner present. About 35.3% of all households were made up of individuals and 19.2% had someone living alone who was 65 years of age or older.

The 2020 census counted 872 housing units, of which 10.8% were vacant. The homeowner vacancy rate was 3.0% and the rental vacancy rate was 5.8%.

Racial composition as of the 2020 census
Race	Number	Percent
White	1,531	86.6%
Black or African American	5	0.3%
American Indian and Alaska Native	19	1.1%
Asian	13	0.7%
Native Hawaiian and Other Pacific Islander	0	0.0%
Some other race	50	2.8%
Two or more races	149	8.4%
Hispanic or Latino (of any race)	126	7.1%

=== 2010 census ===
As of the 2010 census, there were 1,673 people, 751 households, and 444 families residing in the city. The population density was 984.1 inhabitants per square mile (380.0/km^{2}). There were 902 housing units at an average density of 530.6 per square mile (204.9/km^{2}). The racial makeup of the city was 94.5% White, 0.1% African American, 0.8% Native American, 0.5% Asian, 2.4% from other races, and 1.7% from two or more races. Hispanic or Latino of any race were 5.7% of the population.

There were 751 households, of which 23.0% had children under the age of 18 living with them, 46.1% were married couples living together, 8.7% had a female householder with no husband present, 4.4% had a male householder with no wife present, and 40.9% were non-families. 36.2% of all households were made up of individuals, and 18% had someone living alone who was 65 years of age or older. The average household size was 2.15 and the average family size was 2.75.

The median age in the city was 48.1 years. 20.6% of residents were under the age of 18; 6.4% were between the ages of 18 and 24; 19.2% were from 25 to 44; 30.5% were from 45 to 64; and 23.3% were 65 years of age or older. The gender makeup of the city was 48.8% male and 51.2% female.

=== 2000 census ===
As of the 2000 census, there were 1,736 people, 777 households, and 470 families residing in the city. The population density was 1,347.8 people per square mile (198.4/km^{2}). There were 873 housing units at an average density of 677.8 per square mile (261.3/km^{2}). The racial makeup of the city was 95.79% White, 0.35% African American, 0.58% Native American, 0.58% Asian, 0.86% from other races, and 1.84% from two or more races. Hispanic or Latino of any race were 2.36% of the population.

There were 777 households, out of which 24.1% had children under the age of 18 living with them, 48.5% were married couples living together, 8.9% had a female householder with no husband present, and 39.4% were non-families. 36.4% of all households were made up of individuals, and 17.6% had someone living alone who was 65 years of age or older. The average household size was 2.15 and the average family size was 2.75.

In the city, the age distribution of the population shows 21.7% under the age of 18, 5.1% from 18 to 24, 21.8% from 25 to 44, 26.3% from 45 to 64, and 25.1% who were 65 years of age or older. The median age was 46 years. For every 100 females, there were 93.5 males. For every 100 females age 18 and over, there were 86.3 males.

The median income for a household in the city was $32,560, and the median income for a family was $40,240. Males had a median income of $32,500 versus $21,083 for females. The per capita income for the city was $18,308. About 8.4% of families and 14.3% of the population were below the poverty line, including 20.1% of those under age 18 and 8.6% of those age 65 or over.

== Arts and culture ==
Places listed on the National Register of Historic Places include:

- The Burroughs (Dr. Frank R.) House
- The Northern Pacific Railroad Depot
- The Greene (Nelson H.) House
- Ritzville Carnegie Library
- Ritzville High School
- Ritzville Historic District

The Burroughs House and the National Pacific Depot have both been ceded to the city and maintained as museums by volunteers.

The New Ritz Theatre was opened in 1937, designed by Bjarne Moe. It maintains the original architecture and seating arrangement for 400 patrons.

Ritzville hosts the largest annual rodeo in eastern Washington.

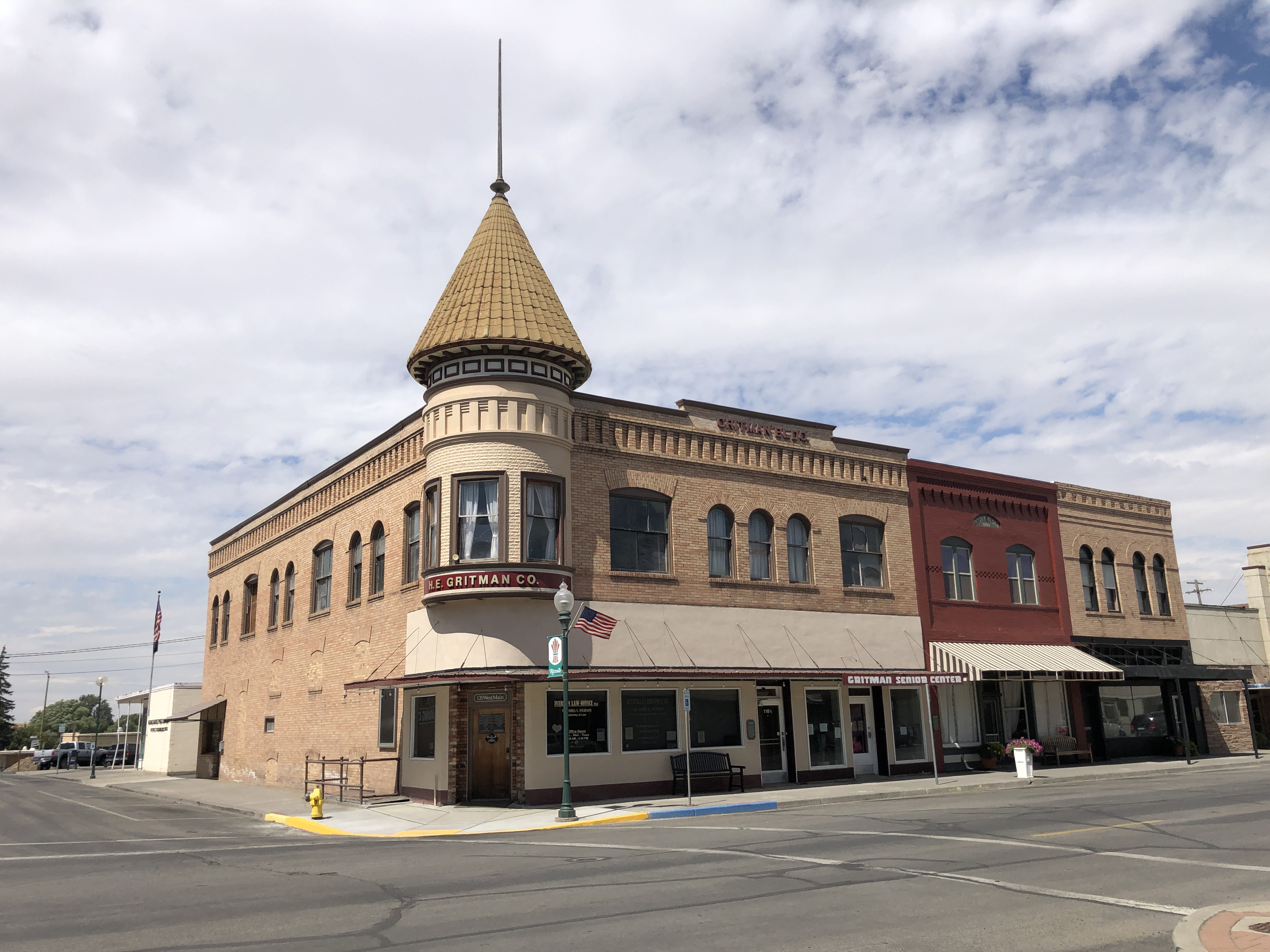
Gritman Building

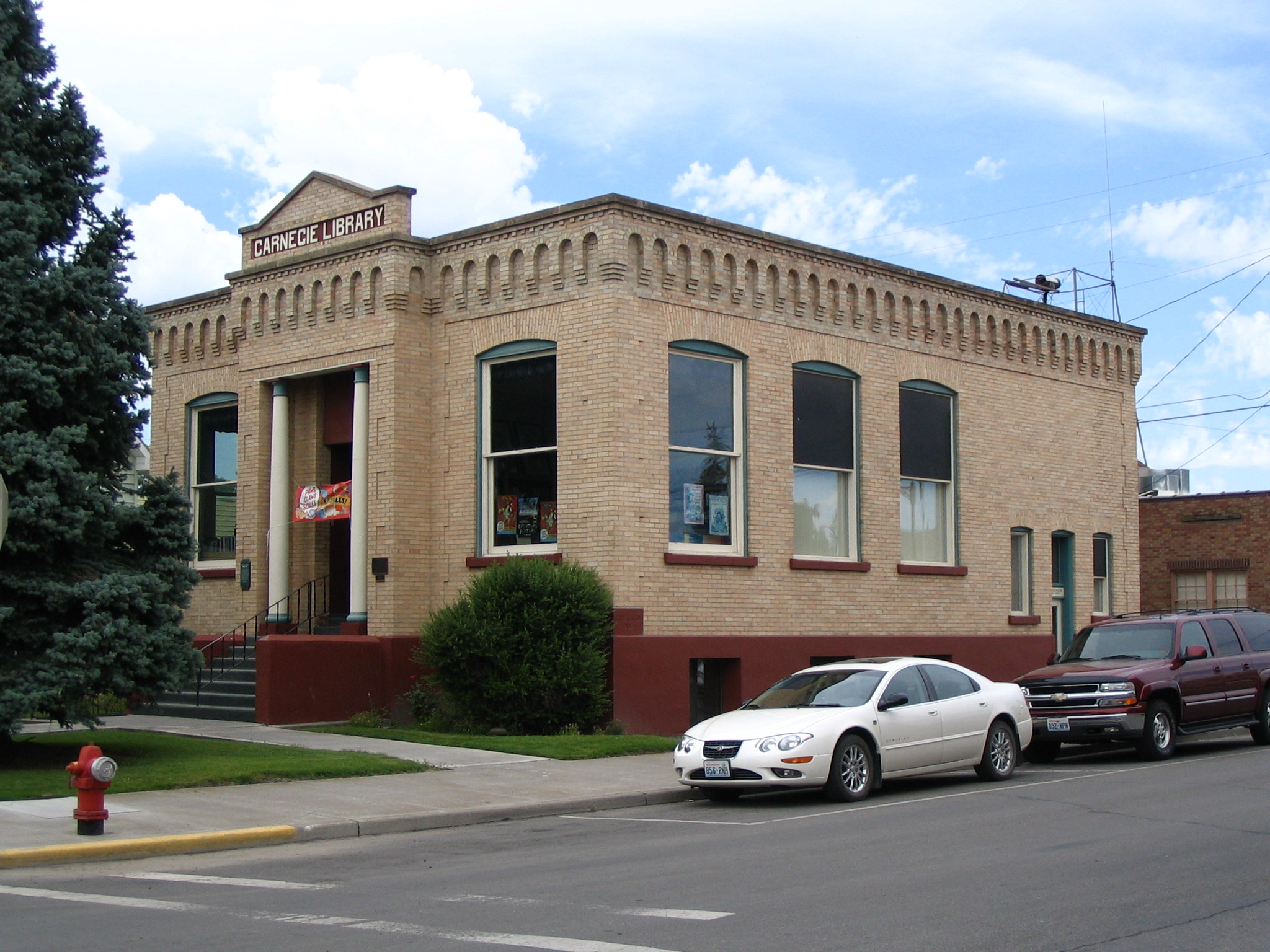
Ritzville Carnegie Library

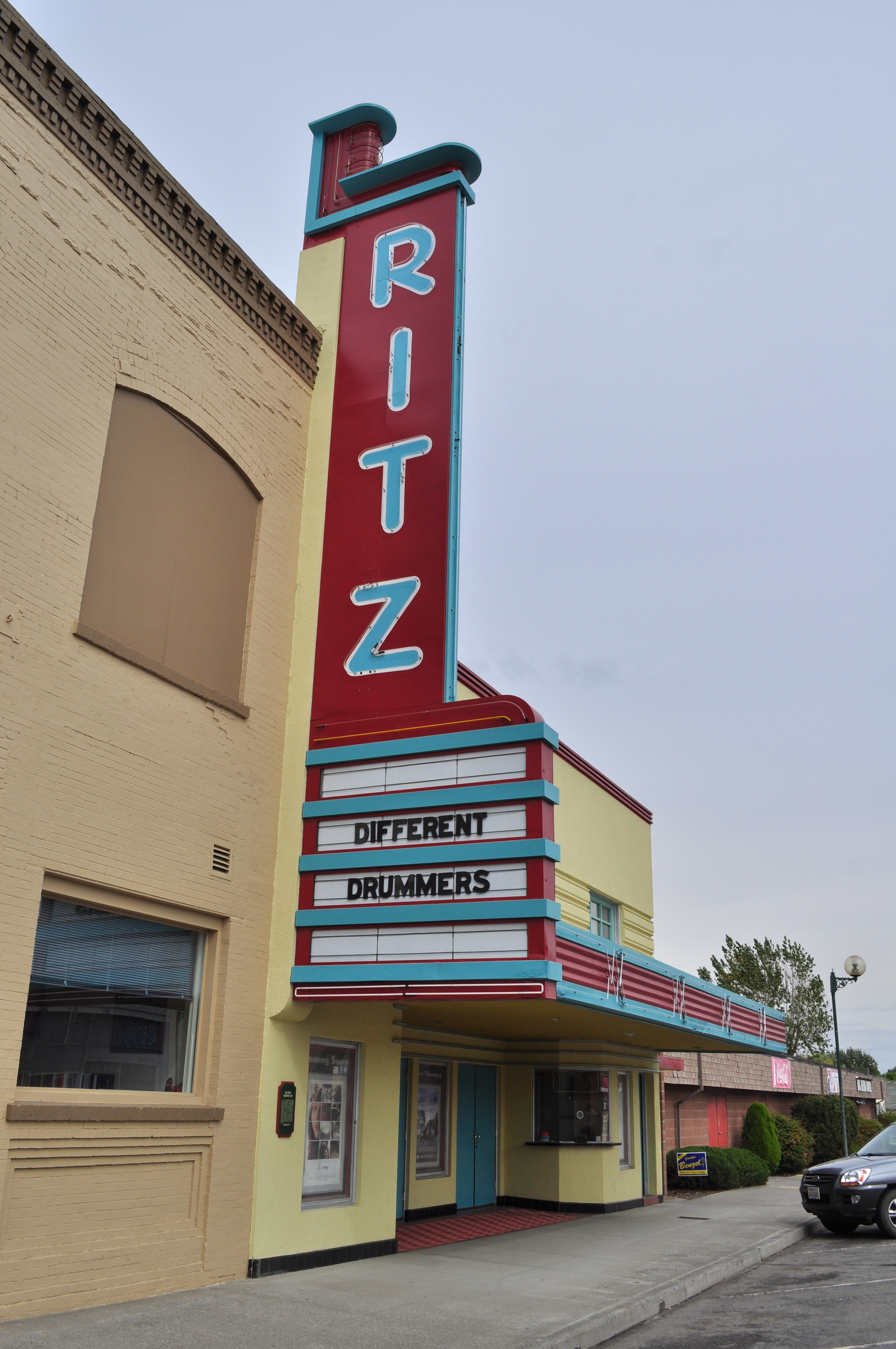
Ritz Theatre

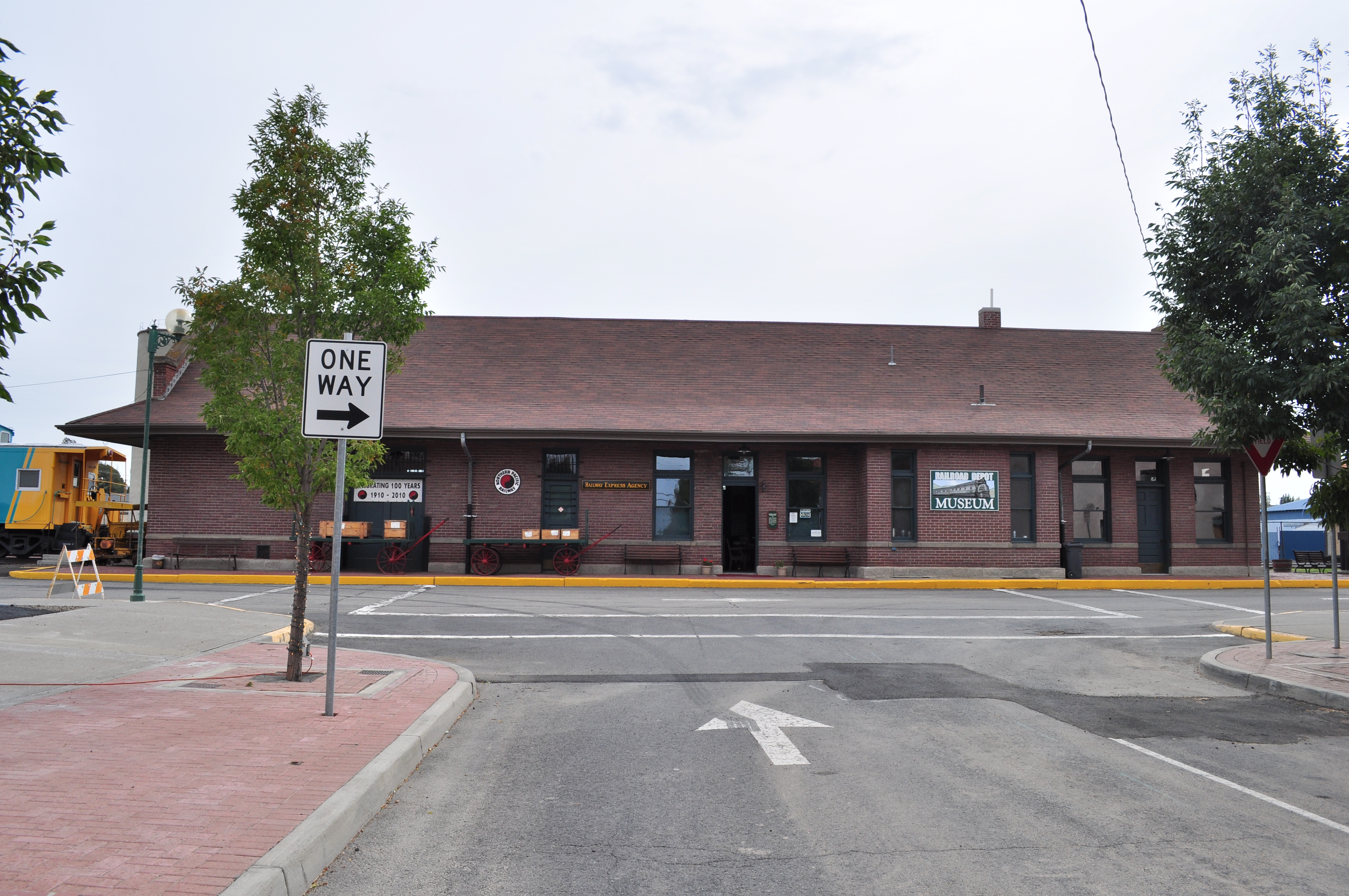
Northern Pacific Railway Depot
