= List of Odd Fellows buildings =

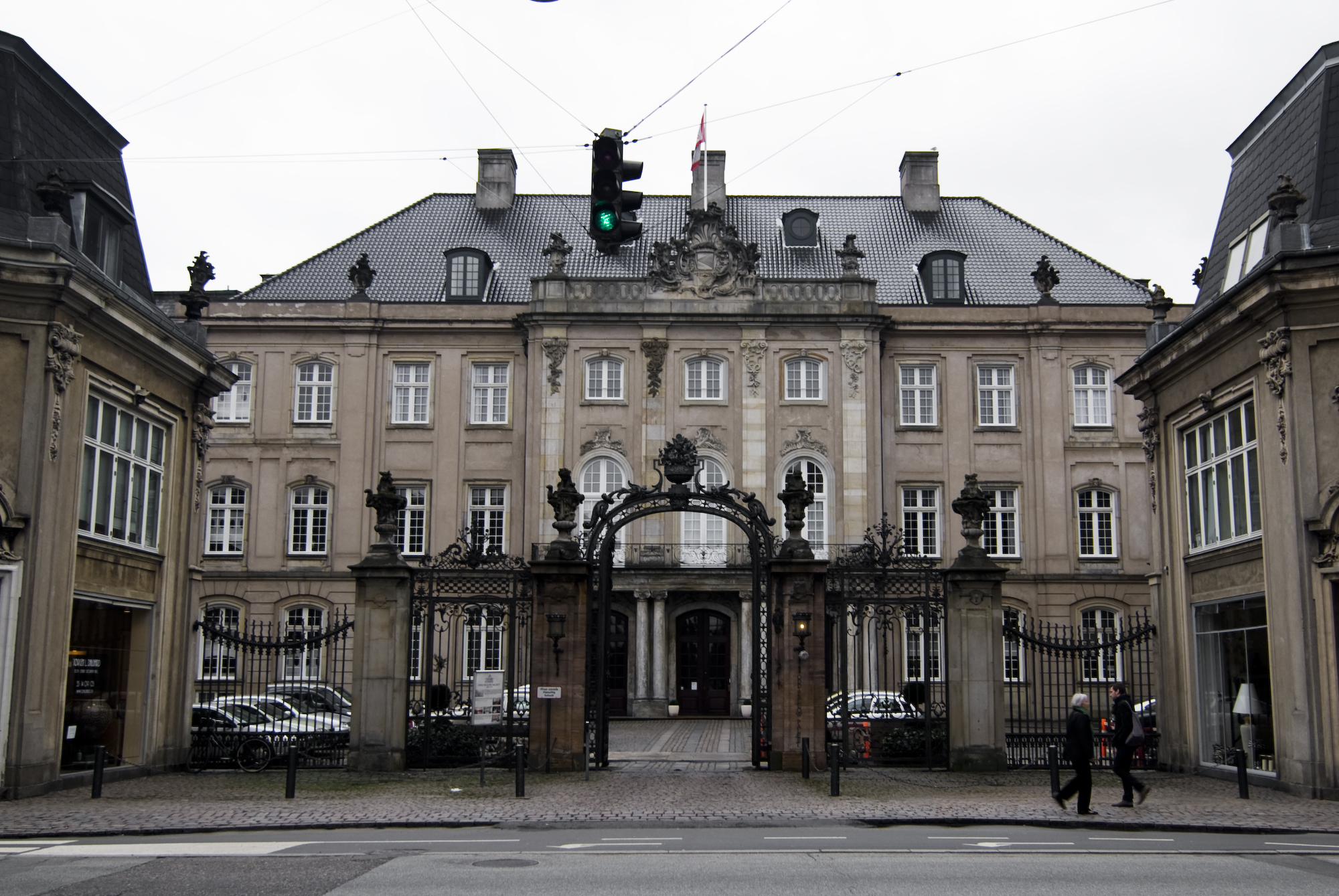
Odd Fellows Mansion, Copenhagen, Denmark (Independent Order of Odd Fellows).

This is a list of notable Odd Fellows buildings, sometimes called "Odd Fellows Hall", "Independent Order of Odd Fellows Building", "IOOF Building", "Odd Fellows Lodge" and variations. Also included is a List of Odd Fellows cemeteries, some of which include contributing buildings.

There are many hundreds of Odd Fellows associated buildings; this list only aims to feature the most significant ones architecturally or otherwise. For the part of the United States, it is intended to cover all that have been documented in the National Register of Historic Places or similar historic registry.

Several of the listed buildings are retirement homes.

There is a building in Three Oaks, Michigan. The engraved granite marker reads:

Three Oaks 1909 IOOF Lodge 44

== Australia ==
(ordered by state then city or town)

Building	Image	Dates	Location	City, state	Notes
Baroona Hall		1883-83-built 1992-QHR-listed	15-17 Caxton Street, Petrie Terrace; 27.4645°S 153.0131°E	Brisbane, Queensland	Designed by Richard Gailey; has also been known as Caxton Street Hall, Josephsons Clothing Factory, and United Brothers Lodge.
Cook Shire Hall		1907 built 1997 QHR-listed	Helen Street; 15.4706°S 145.2502°E	Cooktown, Shire of Cook, Queensland	Replaced a 1907 hurricane-destroyed building; built for the Loyal Captain Cook Lodge of the North Queensland Branch of the Manchester Unity Independent Order of Oddfellows Friendly Society. Served as the Lodge's hall and meeting venue until at least 1936.
Glennie Hall		1880-1891-built <2001-QHR-listed	66 Albion Street; 28.2181°S 152.035°E	Warwick, Southern Downs Region, Queensland	Single-storey masonry hall built 1880-81 and extended 1891 for the Royal Rose of Warwick Manchester Unity Independent Order of Odd Fellows (MUIOOF) Lodge. Classical architecture; known also as Odd Fellows Hall
Oddfellows Home Hotel		1876-built 2004-QHR-listed	Wood and Wantley Streets; 28.2191°S 152.0252°E	Warwick, Southern Downs Region, Queensland	Boarding hotel built by a prominent member of the Rose Lodge of Oddfellows in Warwick.
IOOF Building (Adelaide)		1963-completed		Adelaide, South Australia	First HQ of the Grand Lodge of South Australia of the IOOF was at 11-13 Flinders Street; replaced by purpose-built 47 Gawler Place, completed in 1963.
Norfolk Hotel a.k.a. Oddfellows Hotel		1887-opened	47, South Terrace; 32°3′25.49″S 115°44′57.92″E	Fremantle, Western Australia, Western Australia	Victorian Georgian-style building known for most of its existence as Oddfellows Hotel
Wanslea (I/National Order of Oddfellows Orphanage)	try Wanslea	1905-built 1996-WA-listed	78 & 80 Railway St	Cottesloe, Western Australia	Federation Free Style two storey red brick orphanage
RAOB Lodge (Harbour Master's House, Oddfellows Building)	try RAOB Lodge		283 Marine Tce	Geraldton, Western Australia	
Oddfellows Hall (Leederville) a.k.a. IOOF Buffaloes Lodge	try IOOF Buffaloes Lodge		217 Oxford St	Leederville, Western Australia	
			3 Oddfellow St	Toodyay, Western Australia	
Jager Stores			111-113 Stirling Terrace	Toodyay, Western Australia	Has also been known as Toodyay Newsagency, Markets, Drapery & Craft

== Canada ==
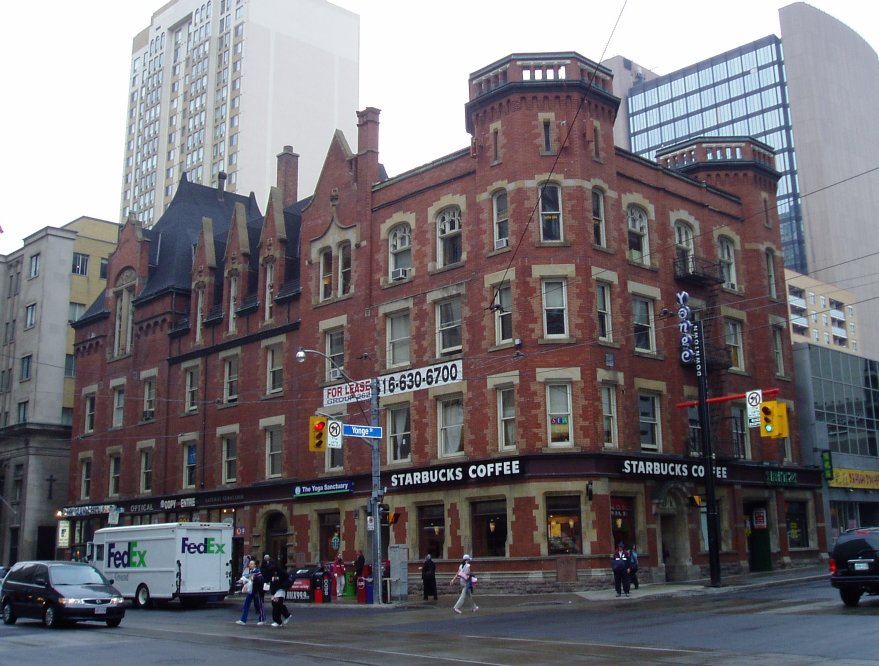
IOOF Hall, Toronto

- IOOF Hall (Toronto), Ontario, at 43°39′41.56″N 79°23′0.16″W
- Odd Fellows Temple (Saskatoon)

== Denmark ==
Building	Image	Built	Odd Fellows property	Location	Country	Description
Odd Fellows Mansion, Copenhagen		1751	1900	Copenhagen	Denmark	
Kong Hroar Loge No. 26					Denmark	Once the home of Bishop Hertz (d. 1825), is adjacent to the Roskilde Cathedral. It was purchased by the IOOF in 1930.

== Finland ==
Building	Image	Built	Odd Fellows property	Location	Country	Description
Helsinki Odd Fellow House				Bulevarden 11 A, 00120 Helsingfors, Finland	Finland	Swedish speaking Lodges
Helsinki Odd Fellow House				Vuorimiehenkatu 23 b, 00140 Helsinki, Finland	Finland	Finnish speaking Lodges
Turku Odd Fellow House		2011	2011	Rätiälänkatu 2, Turku, Finland	Finland	In the Odd Fellow House in Turku there is space for 11 Lodges which have their meetings on the weeknights at 19.00. In Turku there are both Swedish and Finnish speaking Lodges, in this Odd Fellow House the Finnish speaking Lodges have their meetings. The special thing in this Odd Fellow House in Finland is that it is the only building which is built from the beginning for the Odd Fellow Lodges meetings.
Turku Odd Fellow House				Auragatan 1 B, 20100 ÅBO (Turku)	Finland	Swedish speaking lodges in Turku (Åbo) have their meetings in this Odd Fellow House.

== New Zealand ==
Building	Image	Built	Odd Fellows property	Location	Country	Description
Oddfellows Hall (Reefton)				56 Bridge Street, Reefton	New Zealand	New Zealand Historic Places Trust/West Coast Category II historic place #3035.

== Sweden ==
Building	Image	Built	Odd Fellows property	Location	Country	Description
Banér Palace		18th century	1922	Stockholm	Sweden	

== United States ==
(ordered by state then city)

The International Order of Odd Fellows was established in the U.S. in 1819. In 1834, "the Odd Fellows of North America separated from the English order."

=== Alaska ===
Building	Image	Built	NRHP listed	Location	City, state	Notes
Oddfellows Hall (Fairbanks, Alaska)		1907	1980 NRHP	825 1st Avenue	Fairbanks, Alaska	

See also Media related to Odd Fellows buildings in Alaska at Wikimedia Commons

=== Arizona ===
Building	Image	Built	NRHP listed	Location	City, state	Notes
IOOF Building (Kingman, Arizona)		1912	1986	208 North Fifth Street; 35°11′22″N 114°3′0″W	Kingman, Arizona	Mission/Spanish Revival architecture
Oddfellows Home				Safford, Arizona		

See also Media related to Odd Fellows buildings in Arizona at Wikimedia Commons

=== Arkansas ===
Building	Image	Built	NRHP listed	Location	City, state	Notes
Independent Order of Odd Fellows Building (Benton, Arkansas)		1913	2004	123-125 North Market; 34°33′58″N 92°35′16″W	Benton, Arkansas	Early Commercial architecture

See also Media related to Odd Fellows buildings in Arizona at Wikimedia Commons

=== California ===
Building	Image	Built	NRHP listed	Location	City, state	Notes
Arroyo Grande IOOF Hall		1902	1991	128 Bridge St. 35°7′20″N 120°34′38″W	Arroyo Grande, California	Romanesque
Oddfellows Hall		1894	2011	1226&1/2 Lincoln Way	Auburn, California	Three-story red brick Italianate home of IOOF Lodge No. 7, founded in 1852. Henry T. Holmes, builder of the Hall, was a '49er and a founding father of Auburn.
IOOF building			1961 NHLD CP; 1961 NRHP CP		Bodie, California	Included in Bodie Historic District
IOOF Lodge No. 355		1917 built	2007 NRHP	18819 East CA 88; 38°11′30″N 121°5′6″W	Clements, California	
Odd Fellows Hall (Eureka, California)		1883 built	1978 NRHP	123 F St. 40°48′17″N 124°9′54″W	Eureka, California	Second Empire architecture
Odd Fellows Hall (Ferndale, California)		1875	1992	425-431 Main Street; 40°34′36.35″N 124°15′48.71″W	Ferndale, California	Victorian False-front
Fullerton Odd Fellows Temple		?	2002	112 E. Commonwealth Ave. 33°52′13″N 117°55′25″W	Fullerton, California	Early Commercial architecture
Gabilan Lodge No. 372-Independent Order of Odd Fellows		1914	1986	117 Fourth St. 36°30′28″N 121°26′33″W	Gonzales, California	Classical Revival architecture
Odd Fellows Hall (La Grange, California)		1855	1979	Yosemite Blvd. 37°39′48″N 120°27′41″W	La Grange, California	Vernacular Greek Revival architecture
I.O.O.F. Hall (Mokelumne Hill, California)		1854		Center Street; 38°18′7.77″N 120°42′21.52″W	Mokelumne Hill, California	Expanded in 1861 to add Odd Fellows meeting space. Became what is believed to be first 3-story building in inland California. California Historical Landmark-listed
Odd Fellows Temple (Pasadena, California)		1933	1985	120 N. El Molino Ave. 34°08′53″N 118°08′12″W	Pasadena, California	Late 19th and 20th Century Revivals architecture, Spanish Colonial Revival architecture
Odd Fellows Building (Red Bluff, California)		1883 built	1976 NRHP	342 Oak St. 40°10′36″N 122°14′3″W	Red Bluff, California	Late Victorian, Italianate architecture
Independent Order of Odd Fellows Building (San Diego, California)		1882	1978	32°42′42″N 117°9′31″W	San Diego, California	Late 19th and 20th Century Revivals architecture in the Gaslamp district of San Diego.
Odd Fellows Lodge No. 365		1972		401 N. Hagar St. 34.28754°N 118.43774°W	San Fernando, California	
Odd Fellows Temple		1986 NRHP CP	26 7th Street; 37.78012°N 122.41245°W	San Francisco, California	Contributing in Market Street Theatre and Loft District	
Old School House				36.84542°N 121.53767°W	San Juan Buatista, California	Old School House and IOOF hall
Odd Fellows Hall (Santa Ana, California)		1906	1983	309-311 N. Main St. 33°44′51″N 117°51′59″W	Santa Ana, California	
I.O.O.F. Lodge No. 55 Hall (Weaverville, Trinity County, California) aka John Cole Building			1971 NRHP CP	40°43′52″N 122°56′27″W	Weaverville, California	Historic American Buildings Survey-listed and included in Weaverville Historic District
I.O.O.F. Hall (Woodbridge, California)		1861	1982	Main St. 38°9′17″N 121°17′59″W	Woodbridge, California	Early Commercial architecture
I.O.O.F. Building (Woodland, California)		1905	1982	723 Main St. 38°40′40″N 121°46′11″W	Woodland, California	Mission/Spanish Revival architecture

See also Media related to Odd Fellows buildings in California at Wikimedia Commons

=== Colorado ===
Building	Image	Built	NRHP listed	Location	City, state	Notes
IOOF Building		1899 built	NRHP CP		Boulder, Colorado	Included in Boulder Historic District?
IOOF Hall (De Beque, Colorado)		1900	1993	Jct. of 4th St. and Curtis Ave. 39°20′0″N 108°12′51″W	De Beque, Colorado	Late 19th and Early 20th Century American Movements architecture
Englewood IOOF Lodge No. 138 Building			2021 NRHP	3421-27 South Broadway; 39.6546°N 104.9877°W	Englewood, Colorado	
Longmont Lodge #29		1907	2017 NRHP CP	434 Main St	Longmont, Colorado	Contributing in Downtown Longmont Historic District. See Facebook Page.
Meeker I.O.O.F. Lodge—Valentine Lodge No. 47		1897	2014	400 Main St. 40°02′15″N 107°54′40″W	Meeker, Colorado	
Russell Gulch IOOF Hall		1895	2011	81 Russell Gulch Road; 39°46′48″N 105°32′05″W	Russell Gulch, Colorado	

See also Media related to Odd Fellows buildings in Colorado at Wikimedia Commons

=== Delaware ===
Building	Image	Built	NRHP listed	Location	City, state	Notes
Centreville Hall	Centreville Hall	1876	1983	5725 Kennett Pike; 39°49′16″N 75°37′0″W	Centreville, Delaware	Included in the Centreville Historic District
Odd Fellows Lodge		1851 built		65 E. Main St. 39°40′59″N 75°45′03″W	Newark, Delaware	Home of Oriental Lodge #12, which received its charter in 1847.

See also Media related to Odd Fellows buildings in Delaware at Wikimedia Commons

=== Florida ===
Building	Image	Built	NRHP listed	Location	City, state	Notes
Odd Fellows Home (Gainesville, Florida)		1893 built			Gainesville, Florida	"Odd Fellows Home was built in 1893 as a tuberculosis sanatorium for Odd Fellows and Rebekahs. It was subsequently used as a girls school and as the city hospital. In 1914 it became a rest home for aged Odd Fellows and an orphanage. The home was closed in 1966."

See also Media related to Odd Fellows buildings in Florida at Wikimedia Commons

=== Georgia ===
Building	Image	Built	NRHP listed	Location	City, state	Notes
Odd Fellows Building and Auditorium	Odd Fellows Building and Auditorium, Atlanta, Georgia	1912-13	1975	228-250 Auburn Ave., N.E. 33°45′20″N 84°22′46″W	Atlanta, Georgia	Tudor Revival architecture and skyscraper Included in the Sweet Auburn Historic District of Atlanta, Georgia

See also Media related to Odd Fellows buildings in Georgia (U.S. state) at Wikimedia Commons

=== Idaho ===
Building	Image	Built	NRHP listed	Location	City, state	Notes
Independent Order of Odd Fellows Hall (Ashton, Idaho)	Independent Order of Odd Fellows Hall, Ashton, Idaho	1907	1997	601 Main St. 44°4′18″N 111°26′49″W	Ashton, Idaho	Early Commercial architecture
Blackfoot I.O.O.F. Hall		1905	1979	57 Bridge St.43°11′22″N 112°20′41″W	Blackfoot, Idaho	
Ada Odd Fellows Temple		1903	1982	109-115 1/2 N. 9th St. 43°36′58″N 116°12′15″W	Boise, Idaho	Renaissance architecture, Late Medieval architecture
Chinese Odd Fellows Building		1911	1982	610-612 Front St. 43°36′49″N 116°12′7″W	Boise, Idaho	Designed by Tourtellotte and Hummel
Rosedale Odd Fellows Temple				1755 Broadway	Boise, Idaho	
I.O.O.F. Lodge 97		1902 built			Boise, Idaho	Contributing in Hyde Park Historic District
Buhl IOOF Building		1919	1984	1014-16 Main St. 42°35′56″N 114°45′35″W	Buhl, Idaho	Benjamin Morgan Nisbet designed; Early Commercial architecture, Chicago style
Caldwell Odd Fellow Home for the Aged		1920	1982	N. 14th Ave. 43°40′0″N 116°40′20″W	Caldwell, Idaho	Tourtellotte and Hummel-designed; Late 19th and 20th Century Revivals architecture, Second Renaissance Revival architecture
I.O.O.F. Hall (Challis, Idaho)		1896	1980	521 Main Ave. 44°30′17″N 114°13′59″W	Challis, Idaho	Queen Anne
I.O.O.F. Building (Idaho City, Idaho)					Idaho City, Idaho	
I.O.O.F. Building (Idaho Falls, Idaho)		1909	1984	393 N. Park Ave. 43°52′28″N 112°2′49″W	Idaho Falls, Idaho	Romanesque Revival architecture
Montpelier Odd Fellows Hall		1898	1978	843 Washington St. 42°19′2″N 111°18′27″W	Montpelier, Idaho	Renaissance architecture
Odd Fellows Hall (Salmon, Idaho)		1874	1978	516 Main St. 45°10′32″N 113°53′32″W	Salmon, Idaho	Greek Revival architecture
Salmon Odd Fellows Hall		1907	1978	510-514 Main St. 45°10′32″N 113°53′32″W	Salmon, Idaho	Classical Revival architecture

See also Media related to Odd Fellows buildings in Idaho at Wikimedia Commons

=== Illinois ===
Building	Image	Built	NRHP listed	Location	City, state	Notes
Independent Order of Odd Fellows (I.O.O.F) Monitor Lodge No. 235					Bone Gap, Illinois	
Polo Independent Order of Odd Fellows Lodge No. 197		1902	2004	117 W. Mason St. 41°59′13″N 89°34′38″W	Polo, Illinois	Classical Revival
Independent Order of Odd Fellows (I.O.O.F) Monitor Lodge No. 747					Casey, Illinois	

See also Media related to Odd Fellows buildings in Illinois at Wikimedia Commons

=== Indiana ===
Building	Image	Built	NRHP listed	Location	City, state	Notes
					Brook, Indiana	
					Brookston, Indiana	
I.O.O.F. Lodge (Chesterton, Indiana)		c.1905 built	1999 NRHP CP		Chesterton, Indiana	Contributing in Chesterton Commercial Historic District
Calumet Lodge IOOF Lodge No. 601		1916		177-79 State St.	Hammond, Indiana	
					Morgantown, Indiana	Contributing in Morgantown Historic District (Morgantown, Indiana)
I.O.O.F. Building (Stinesville, Indiana)		1894	1995 NRHP CP	8201 Main Street	Stinesville, Indiana	Main contributing building in Stinesville Commercial Historic District
Hall of Tell City Lodge, No. 206, IOOF		1894	1992	701 Main St. 37°57′3″N 86°46′12″W	Tell City, Indiana	Romanesque Revival architecture
Palace Lodge		1892	1984	Center and Main Sts. 38°22′58″N 87°12′57″W	Winslow, Indiana	Joint project of local Odd Fellows and Knights of Pythias chapters.

See also Media related to Odd Fellows buildings in Indiana at Wikimedia Commons
More in Media related to Independent Order of Odd Fellows in Indiana at Wikimedia Commons to clear out.

=== Iowa ===
Building	Image	Built	NRHP listed	Location	City, state	Notes
Cedar Falls Independent Order of Odd Fellows		1902	1997	401-403 Main St. 42°32′5″N 92°26′41″W	Cedar Falls, Iowa	Late 19th and 20th Century Revivals architecture
Wupperman Block/I.O.O.F. Hall		1859	1983	508-512 Brady St. 41°31′30″N 90°34′26″W	Davenport, Iowa	Renaissance Revival architecture
					Dunlap, Iowa	
I.O.O.F. Hall (Garnavillo, Iowa)		1860	1979	Centre St. 42°52′5″N 91°14′10″W	Garnavillo, Iowa	Greek Revival architecture
IOOF Building (Lisbon, Iowa)		1900	?	122 W. Main St; 41°55′17″N 91°23′11″W	Lisbon, Iowa	Currently owned by a medical equipment company.
IOOF Building (Maquoketa, Iowa)		1886	1991	103 N. Main; 42°4′9″N 90°39′54″W	Maquoketa, Iowa	Late Victorian architecture
Odd Fellows Hall (Monticello, Iowa)		1871	1985	203 W. 1st St. 42°14′16″N 91°11′27″W	Monticello, Iowa	Italianate architecture
Onawa IOOF Opera House		1907	1990	1023 Tenth Ave. 42°1′32″N 90°5′47″W	Onawa, Iowa	Romanesque Revival architecture
Odd Fellows Hall (Troy Mills, Iowa)		1900	1985	Troy Mills Rd. 42°17′20″N 91°40′57″W	Troy Mills, Iowa	Italianate architecture
I.O.O.F. Valley Junction Lodge Hall No. 604		1898	2017 NRHP CP	West Des Moines, Iowa	Individually listed and contributing in Valley Junction Commercial Historic District	Italianate architecture

See also Media related to Odd Fellows buildings in Iowa at Wikimedia Commons

=== Kansas ===
Building	Image	Built	NRHP listed	Location	City, state	Notes
IOOF Lodge (Alton, Kansas)		1885	2002	Jct. of Nicholas and Mill Sts. 39°27′21″N 98°56′53″W	Alton, Kansas	NRHP-listed

See also Media related to Odd Fellows buildings in Kansas at Wikimedia Commons

=== Kentucky ===
Building	Image	Built	NRHP listed	Location	City, state	Notes
					Clay, Kentucky	
Independent Order of Odd Fellows Hall (Williamstown, Kentucky)		1910	2025	113 N. Main Street; 38°38′14.0″N 84°33′38.2″W	Williamstown, Kentucky	
Odd Fellows Hall (Covington, Kentucky)		1856	1980	Fifth Street and Madison Avenue; 39°5′9.07″N 84°30′37.75″W	Covington, Kentucky	Center of Covington's civic and political life for most of the Victorian era. When the American Civil War ended, victorious Union General Ulysses S. Grant was honored at a reception there.
Odd Fellows Temple (Lexington, Kentucky)		1870	1980	115-119 W. Main St. 38°2′48″N 84°29′52″W	Lexington, Kentucky	Designed or built by Cincinnatus Shryock, with Second Empire architecture, Italianate architecture
Odd Fellows Temple (Frankfort, Kentucky)		1871	1982	313-319 St. Clair St. 38°2′48″N 84°29′52″W	Frankfort, Kentucky	Built by Independent Order of Odd Fellows, Capital Lodge #6, with Second Empire architecture, Italianate architecture
Odd Fellows Building (Owensboro, Kentucky)		1895	1986	200-204 W. Third St. 37°46′24″N 87°6′44″W	Owensboro, Kentucky	Beaux Arts architecture, Italian Renaissance architecture
Odd Fellows Building (Pikeville, Kentucky)		1915	1984	333 2nd St. 37°28′50″N 82°31′6″W	Pikeville, Kentucky	Served as a warehouse and as a business
Odd Fellows Building (Princeton, Kentucky)		1900	1988	100-102 East Court Square. 37°06′31.3″N 87°52′54.1″W	Princeton, Kentucky	Contributing property of the Princeton Downtown Commercial District.
Hopkinsville Odd Fellows Building		1902	1979	E 9th Street & S Virginia Street. 36°51′55.1″N 87°29′15.2″W	Hopkinsville, Kentucky	Contributing property of the Hopkinsville Commercial Historic District.

See also Media related to Odd Fellows buildings in Kentucky at Wikimedia Commons

=== Maine ===
Building	Image	Built	NRHP listed	Location	City, state	Notes
Albion IOOF Hall		1813		22 Main St.	Albion, Maine	Building houses Albion's Town Office.
Brooklin IOOF Hall		1896	1990	SR 175; 44°15′55″N 68°34′51″W	Brooklin, Maine	Second Empire architecture
Odd Fellows-Rebekah Hall (Cornish, Maine)		1902	1983	High St. 43°48′14″N 70°48′12″W	Cornish, Maine	architecture
Odd Fellows Block (Lewiston, Maine)		1876	1986	182-190 Lisbon Street; 44°5′44″N 70°13′1″W	Lewiston, Maine	Gothic architecture
Star of Hope Lodge		1885	1982	Main St. 44°2′52″N 68°49′59″W	Vinalhaven, Maine	Second Empire
West Paris Lodge No. 15, I.O.O.F.		1876-80	2012	221 Main Street; 44°19′33″N 70°34′21″W	West Paris, Maine	Italianate architecture

See also Media related to Odd Fellows buildings in Maine at Wikimedia Commons

=== Maryland ===
Building	Image	Built	NRHP listed	Location	City, state	Notes
Odd Fellows Hall (Baltimore, 1831)		1831		30 North Gay St	Baltimore, Maryland	First Odd Fellows Hall in the United States. Demolished in 1890.
Odd Fellows Hall (Baltimore, 1891)		1891	1980	300 Cathedral St. 39°17′35″N 76°37′2″W	Baltimore, Maryland	Romanesque Revival architecture
Odd Fellows Lodge (Bel Air, Maryland)		1852	1975	21 Pennsylvania Ave. 39°32′13″N 76°20′56″W	Bel Air, Maryland	Greek Revival architecture
Grand United Order of Odd Fellows, Sandy Spring Lodge #6430		1920s		1308 Olney-Sandy Spring Rd; 39°8′52.58″N 77°1′52.96″W	Sandy Spring, Maryland	"Two-story, gable-fronted frame structure that is an important part of the area's African American history. Designated a Preserve America Steward in August 2010."

See also Media related to Odd Fellows buildings in Maryland at Wikimedia Commons

=== Massachusetts ===
Building	Image	Built	NRHP listed	Location	City, state	Notes
Odd Fellows' Hall (Beverly, Massachusetts)		1874	1978	184-192 Cabot Street; 42°32′52.4″N 70°52′45.16″W	Beverly, Massachusetts	Gothic architecture
Odd Fellows' Hall (Buckland, Massachusetts)		1877	1979	1-5 State Street; 42°36′14″N 72°44′23″W	Buckland, Massachusetts	
Odd Fellows Hall (Cambridge, Massachusetts)		1884	1982	536 Massachusetts Avenue	Cambridge, Massachusetts	Romanesque Revival architecture
Odd Fellows Building (Malden, Massachusetts)		1907	1988	442 Main Street; 42°25′45″N 71°4′2″W	Malden, Massachusetts	Late 19th and 20th Century Revivals architecture, Other architecture
Odd Fellows' Home (Worcester, Massachusetts)		1890	1980	40 Randolph Rd. 42°17′56″N 71°47′51″W	Worcester, Massachusetts	Late Victorian architecture

See also Media related to Odd Fellows buildings in Massachusetts at Wikimedia Commons

=== Michigan ===
Building	Image	Built	NRHP listed	Location	City, state	Notes
Clark Memorial Hall		1888	1985	120–124 S. Winter St. 41°53′55″N 84°02′18″W	Adrian, Michigan	Also known as the Adrian I.O.O.F. Hall, built for the Adrian Lodge of the Odd Fellowship branch of the Odd Fellows. Victorian architecture.
I.O.O.F. Centennial Building		1876	2015	150 E. Chisholm St. 45°03′40″N 83°25′57″W	Alpena, Michigan	Italianate architecture
Odd Fellows Valley Lodge No. 189 Building		?	2010	1900 Broadway Ave. 43°34′11″N 83°53′38″W	Bay City, Michigan	
Detroit Odd Fellows Temple		1874		1208 Randolph St.	Detroit, Michigan	Victorian architecture, 1980 NRHP-listed part of district
Spiritual Israel Church and Its Army Temple		1911	2014	9375 Amity St. 42°21′52″N 82°59′13″W	Detroit, Michigan	Classical Revival architecture
Wyandotte Odd Fellows Temple		1911	2009	81 Chestnut St. 42°12′19″N 83°8′58″W	Wyandotte, Michigan	

See also Media related to Odd Fellows buildings in Michigan at Wikimedia Commons

=== Minnesota ===
Building	Image	Built	NRHP listed	Location	City, state	Notes
IOOF Hall (Longfellow Minneapolis)		1909		3000 27th Ave. South	Minneapolis, Minnesota	The former meeting hall building in the Longfellow neighborhood was destroyed by arson during the George Floyd protests in Minneapolis–Saint Paul on May 28, 2020.
IOOF Hall (NE Minneapolis)		1891		401 East Hennepin Ave.	Minneapolis, Minnesota	Development of historic storefronts as a part of general rehabilitation of a three-story fraternal block built in 1891 at 401 East Hennepin Avenue near downtown Minneapolis.
Strangers Refuge Lodge Number 74, IOOF		1902	2006	119 S. Broadway Ave. 43°53′35″N 93°29′36″W	New Richland, Minnesota	Has served as a meeting hall, as an auditorium, as a music facility, and as a theater

See also Media related to Odd Fellows buildings in Minnesota at Wikimedia Commons

=== Missouri ===
Building	Image	Built	NRHP listed	Location	City, state	Notes
Independent Order of Odd Fellows Building		1931		39°40′N 93°38′W	Dawn, Missouri	The last purpose for the building was for Three D Home Repair, Plumbing, Backhoe, and Trenching service with a name and phone number to call.
Iron Lodge No. 107. I.O.O.F.		1873	2013 NRHP-listed	133 N. Main St.37°35′59″N 90°37′48″W	Ironton, Missouri	Three-story brick building with Italianate and Greek Revival design elements. Built to serve primarily as a meeting place for fraternal lodges.
IOOF Liberty Lodge No. 49		1923	1992	16-18 E. Franklin St. 39°14′50″N 94°25′10″W	Liberty, Missouri	Moderne architecture, Early 20th-century commercial architecture
St. Charles Odd Fellows Hall		1878	1987	117 S. Main; 38°46′50″N 90°28′54″W	St. Charles, Missouri	Second Empire architecture
IOOF Building (West Plains, Missouri)			Courthouse Square	West Plains, Missouri	Included in Courthouse Square Historic District (West Plains, Missouri)	

See also Media related to Odd Fellows buildings in Missouri at Wikimedia Commons

=== Montana ===
Building	Image	Built	NRHP listed	Location	City, state	Notes
IOOF Hall and Fromberg Co-operative Mercantile Building		1906	1993	123 W. River St. 45°23′31″N 108°54′31″W	Fromberg, Montana	Has served as a department store and as a meeting hall
IOOF Hall (Stevensville, Montana)		1912	1991	217-219 Main St. 46°30′37″N 114°5′35″W	Stevensville, Montana	
IOOF Lodge (Thompson Falls, Montana)		1901	1986	520 Main St. 47°35′36.4″N 115°20′36.8″W	Thompson Falls, Montana	

See also Media related to Odd Fellows buildings in Montana at Wikimedia Commons

=== Nebraska ===
Building	Image	Built	NRHP listed	Location	City, state	Notes
IOOF Hall and Opera House		1913	1988	Main St. 40°19′21″N 98°35′42″W	Bladen, Nebraska	
IOOF Temple Building		1894	1987	523 E St. 40°8′14″N 97°10′47″W	Fairbury, Nebraska	Romanesque Revival architecture
IOOF Opera House		1893	1988	N. Third and B Sts. 40°52′46″N 97°53′9″W	Hampton, Nebraska	A two-part commercial block building.

See also Media related to Odd Fellows buildings in Nebraska at Wikimedia Commons

=== Nevada ===
Building	Image	Built	NRHP listed	Location	City, state	Notes
Austin Masonic and Odd Fellows Hall		1867	2003	105 Main St. 39°29′34″N 117°4′10″W	Austin, Nevada	Has served as a meeting hall and as a business
I.O.O.F. Building, Mason Valley		1914	1983	1 S. Main St. 38°59′2″N 119°10′11″W	Yerington, Nevada	NRHP-listed

See also Media related to Odd Fellows buildings in Nevada at Wikimedia Commons

=== New Jersey ===
Building	Image	Built	NRHP listed	Location	City, state	Notes
Old Fellows Hall			1995 NRHP CP	34 Main St.	Clinton, New Jersey	Contributing in Clinton Historic District (Clinton, New Jersey)

See also Media related to Odd Fellows buildings in New Jersey at Wikimedia Commons

=== New York ===
Building	Image	Built	NRHP listed	Location	City, state	Notes
Mohegan Manor		1910		58 Oswego Street; 43°9′33.75″N 76°19′57.37″W	Baldwinsville, New York	Designed by Ward Wellington Ward as an Odd Fellows hall.
IOOF Hall (Hunter, New York)		1913	2002	6325 Main St. 42°12′43″N 74°13′3″W	Hunter, New York	Queen Anne
Nathan Comstock Jr. House		1823–1829, 1907		299 Old Niagara Road; 42°11′14″N 78°40′47″W	Lockport, New York	Greek Revival architecture; housed the Odd Fellows Orphanage from 1907 to 1944.
Odd Fellows Hall (New York, New York)		1847	1983	165-171 Grand Street; 40°43′11″N 73°59′53″W	New York, New York	Italianate, Queen Anne, Anglo-Italianate architecture
Odd Fellows Windmill		1892		194-10 109th. Ave. 40°42′17.22″N 73°45′44.49″W	Hollis, New York	Queen Anne
Odd Fellows Lodge and Temple		1887	2014	212 Ash St., 823 N. Townsend St. 43°03′38″N 76°09′53″W	Syracuse, New York	Romanesque Revival

See also Media related to Odd Fellows buildings in New York at Wikimedia Commons

=== North Carolina ===
Building	Image	Built	NRHP listed	Location	City, state	Notes
Odd Fellows Lodge (Goldsboro, North Carolina)		1901	1978	111-115 N. John St. 35°22′59″N 77°59′27″W	Goldsboro, North Carolina	Classical Revival architecture, Romanesque Revival architecture
Odd Fellows Building (Raleigh, North Carolina)		1923	1997	19 W Hargett St. 35°46′40″N 78°38′24″W	Raleigh, North Carolina	Skyscraper with Late 19th and Early 20th Century American Movements architecture, Classical Revival architecture

See also Media related to Odd Fellows buildings in North Carolina at Wikimedia Commons

=== North Dakota ===
Building	Image	Built	NRHP listed	Location	City, state	Notes
Odd Fellows Block (Grand Forks, North Dakota)		1888	1982	23-25 S. 4th St. 47°55′26″N 97°1′47″W	Grand Forks, North Dakota	Romanesque Revival architecture

See also Media related to Odd Fellows buildings in North Dakota at Wikimedia Commons

=== Ohio ===
Building	Image	Built	NRHP listed	Location	City, state	Notes
Chester Town Hall (Chesterville, Ohio)		1867	1979	Sandusky and Short Sts. 40°28′48″N 82°40′57″W	Chesterville, Ohio	Italianate architecture Built as an Odd Fellows Hall
International Order of Odd Fellow Building			1978 CP	101-1/2 East Main St. 39.60164°N 82.94497°W	Circleville, Ohio	Included in Circleville Historic District
Odd Fellows Temple (East Liverpool, Ohio)		1907	1985	120 W. Sixth St. 40°37′16″N 80°34′50″W	East Liverpool, Ohio	
Odd Fellows Hall (Hilliard, Ohio)		1883	1988	4065 Main St. 40°2′5″N 83°9′32″W	Hilliard, Ohio	Italianate architecture
Odd Fellows Hall (Portsmouth, Ohio)		1871	1987	500-506 Court St. 38°44′3″N 83°0′2″W	Portsmouth, Ohio	Italianate architecture
Odd Fellows Hall (Sandusky, Ohio)		1889	2003	231 West Washington Row	Sandusky, Ohio	Queen Anne, Romanesque Revival architecture
Relief Lodge No. 148		1869	1999	405 South Main Street; 39°33′07″N 84°13′59″W	Springboro, Ohio	Italianate
Odd Fellows' Home for Orphans, Indigent and Aged		1898	1980	404 E. McCreight Ave. 39°56′23″N 83°47′59″W	Springfield, Ohio	Renaissance Revival architecture, Chateauesque architecture

See also Media related to Odd Fellows buildings in Ohio at Wikimedia Commons

=== Oklahoma ===
Building	Image	Built	NRHP listed	Location	City, state	Notes
Aline IOOF Lodge No. 263		1930	1984	Off Main and Broadway; 36°30′35″N 98°26′58″W	Aline, Oklahoma	One of four NRHP-listed IOOF buildings in the county
I.O.O.F. Hall (Alva, Oklahoma)		1905	1984	527 Barnes St. 36°48′12″N 98°39′59″W	Alva, Oklahoma	Plains Commercial architecture
I.O.O.F. Building of Buffalo		1917	1983	110 W. Turner St. 36°50′07″N 99°37′53″W	Buffalo, Oklahoma	Plains Commercial architecture
Carmen IOOF Home		1906	1984	36°35′43″N 98°27′43″W	near Carmen, Oklahoma	
Carmen IOOF Lodge No. 84		1902	1984	Main and 4th St. 36°34′45″N 98°27′30″W	Carmen, Oklahoma	Served as a professional building, as a clubhouse, and as a specialty store
Oklahoma Odd Fellows Home at Checotah		1902	2001	211 West North St. 35°28′46″N 101°31′15″W	Checotah, Oklahoma	Romanesque Revival architecture, Bungalow/Craftsman architecture
Cherokee IOOF Lodge No. 219		1931	1984	Grand Ave. and 2nd St. 36°45′23″N 98°21′25″W	Cherokee, Oklahoma	One of four Alfalfa County Odd Fellows buildings that were subject of a 1983 study.

See also Media related to Odd Fellows buildings in Oklahoma at Wikimedia Commons

=== Oregon ===
Building	Image	Built	NRHP listed	Location	City, state	Notes
Adams Odd Fellows Hall		1886	1994	190 Main St. 45°46′3″N 118°33′44″W	Adams, Oregon	Italianate architecture
IOOF Building (Ashland, Oregon)		1879	1978	49-57 N. Main St. 42°11′50″N 122°42′54″W	Ashland, Oregon	Served as a clubhouse and as a specialty store
Enterprise I.O.O.F. Hall		1920	2012	105 NE 1st St. 45°25′34″N 117°16′33″W	Enterprise, Oregon	
Harrisburg Odd Fellows Hall		1882	1992	190 Smith St. 44°16′20″N 123°10′12″W	Harrisburg, Oregon	Italianate architecture
IOOF-Paris Fair Building		1906	1990	315 Oak St. 45°42′30″N 121°31′18″W	Hood River, Oregon	Early Commercial architecture
Lake Oswego Odd Fellows Hall		1890	1979	Durham and Church Sts. 45°24′50″N 122°39′39″W	Lake Oswego, Oregon	Has served as a professional building, as a clubhouse, as a meeting hall, and as a specialty store
Odd Fellows Building (Portland, Oregon)		1922	1980	1019 SW 10th Ave. 45°31′5″N 122°40′56″W	Portland, Oregon	Late Gothic Revival architecture
Chemeketa Lodge No. 1 Odd Fellows Buildings		1900	1988	185-195 High St. NE; 44°56′26.08″N 123°2′14.03″W	Salem, Oregon	Romanesque Revival architecture

See also Media related to Odd Fellows buildings in Oregon at Wikimedia Commons

=== Pennsylvania ===
Building	Image	Built	NRHP listed	Location	City, state	Notes
Loyal Order of Odd Fellows		1860		5619 Germantown Ave.	Philadelphia, Pennsylvania	Significant contribution to the NRHP Colonial Germantown Historic District - Note: Not an IOOF building.
Morgantown Odd Fellows Hall		1868		3172-3176 Main Street	Morgantown, Pennsylvania	Contributing building in Morgantown Historic District - District NRHP-listed 1995
Strasburg Odd Fellows		1856		Strasburg Historic District	Strasburg, Pennsylvania	In the NRHP Strasburg Historic District

See also Media related to Odd Fellows buildings in Pennsylvania at Wikimedia Commons

=== Rhode Island ===
Building	Image	Built	NRHP listed	Location	City, state	Notes
Oddfellows' Hall (East Providence, Rhode Island)		1889	1980	Warren Avenue; 41°49′1″N 71°22′56″W	East Providence, Rhode Island	Shingle Style architecture

See also Media related to Odd Fellows buildings in Rhode Island at Wikimedia Commons

=== South Dakota ===
Building	Image	Built	NRHP listed	Location	City, state	Notes
Odd Fellows Home of Dell Rapids		1910	2010	100 W. 10th St.	Dell Rapids, South Dakota	
IOOF Hall (Fairburn, South Dakota)		1917	1995	Main St. 43°41′08″N 103°12′39″W	Fairburn, South Dakota	Contributing building in Fairburn Historic Commercial District
Odd Fellows Building (Gary, South Dakota)		1898	1976	Main St. 44°47′34″N 96°27′24″W	Gary, South Dakota	Has served as a clubhouse and as a meeting hall

See also Media related to Odd Fellows buildings in South Dakota at Wikimedia Commons

=== Texas ===
Building	Image	Built	NRHP listed	Location	City, state	Notes
I.O.O.F. Lodge (Corsicana, Texas)		c.1900 built	1995 NRHP CP	100 W. Third Ave. 32.09644°N 96.46572°W	Corsicana, Texas	Italianate-influenced. Contributing in Corsicana Commercial Historic District. Later an event center.
I.O.O.F. Lodge (Galveston, Texas)					Galveston, Texas	
Plano National Bank-I.O.O.F. Lodge			2017 NRHP CP		Plano, Texas	Contributing in Plano Downtown Historic District.

See also Media related to Odd Fellows buildings in Texas at Wikimedia Commons

=== Utah ===
Building	Image	Built	NRHP listed	Location	City, state	Notes
Odd Fellows Hall (Beaver, Utah)		1903	1983	33-35 N. Main St. 38°16′29″N 112°38′29″W	Beaver, Utah	Early Commercial architecture
IOOF Relief Home		1890	1984	232 Woodside Ave. 40°38′27″N 111°29′41″W	Park City, Utah	
Independent Order of Odd Fellows Hall (Salt Lake City, Utah)		1891	1977	39 W. Market St. 40°45′41″N 111°53′30″W	Salt Lake City, Utah	Richardsonian Romanesque architecture

See also Media related to Odd Fellows buildings in Utah at Wikimedia Commons

=== Vermont ===
Building	Image	Built	NRHP listed	Location	City, state	Notes
Odd Fellows Block		1874 built		109 Railroad Street	St. Johnsbury, Vermont	Second Empire in style; contributing in St. Johnsbury Historic District

See also Media related to Odd Fellows buildings in Vermont at Wikimedia Commons

=== Virginia ===
Building	Image	Built	NRHP listed	Location	City, state	Notes
Odd Fellows Hall (Alexandria, Virginia)		?	2004	411 S. Columbus St. 38°48′11.3″N 77°2′57.24″W	Alexandria, Virginia	Second Empire architecture
Odd Fellows Hall (Blacksburg, Virginia)		1905	2005	203 Gilbert St. 37°14′9″N 80°25′16″W	Blacksburg, Virginia	Historically a meeting hall
Odd Fellows Hall (Occoquan, Virginia)		1889			Occoquan, Virginia	

See also Media related to Odd Fellows buildings in Virginia at Wikimedia Commons

=== Washington ===
Building	Image	Built	NRHP listed	Location	City, state	Notes
Oddfellows Building					Aberdeen, Washington	
Independent Order of Odd Fellows (IOOF) Hall No. 148		1895	1999	3940 Tolt Ave. 47°38′39″N 121°54′51″W	Carnation, Washington	
Cheney Odd Fellows Hall		?	1990	321 First St. 47°29′12″N 117°34′30″W	Cheney, Washington	Late Victorian architecture, vernacular commercial architecture
Opera House and IOOF Lodge		?	1997	151 W. 1st Ave. 48°32′40″N 117°54′18″W	Colville, Washington	Classical Revival architecture
IOOF Hall, Everett, Washington		?	1912	2813-2815 Wetmore Avenue	Everett, Washington	Contributing building in Hewitt Avenue Historic District
I.O.O.F. Hall (Port Angeles, Washington)					Port Angeles, Washington	
Oddfellows Hall (Seattle, Washington)		?		East Pine and 10th Streets; 47°36′54.14″N 122°19′11.18″W	Seattle, Washington	Renaissance Revival architecture; a "cultural nucleus and point of convergence for community and arts organizations"
Oddfellows Hall (Selah, Washington)					Selah, Washington	
Stanwood IOOF Public Hall		1902	2002	27128 102nd Ave. NW; 48°14′35″N 122°22′11″W	Stanwood, Washington	Western falsefront architecture
Odd Fellows Building (Toppenish, Washington)					Toppenish, Washington	
Vashon Odd Fellows Hall		1912		19704 Vashon Highway SW	Vashon Island, Washington	Built in 1912, designated a King County and/or local landmark in 1985

See also Media related to Odd Fellows buildings in Washington (state) at Wikimedia Commons

=== West Virginia ===
Building	Image	Built	NRHP listed	Location	City, state	Notes
IOOF Lodge Building (Marlinton, West Virginia)		1905	2000	Jct. of 8th St. and Second Ave. 38°16′40″N 80°5′38″W	Marlinton, West Virginia	Italianate architecture
IOOF Lodge Building (Shinnston, West Virginia)		1906	1998	In Shinnston Historic District at corner of Pike and Walnut Streets; 39°23′43″N 80°18′5″W	Shinnston, West Virginia	
Odd Fellows Temple Building (Welch, West Virginia)		1929	1992	43-63 Mc Dowell St; 37°25′52″N 81°35′07″W	Welch, West Virginia	Art Deco architecture
Sharon Lodge No. 28 IOOF		1897	1982	316 5th St. 39°15′55″N 81°33′37″W	Parkersburg, West Virginia	Romanesque Revival architecture
I.O.O.F. Lodge # 329 Building (Iuka, West Virginia)		1882		Laurel Run Rd. 39°30′53.6″N 80°47′23.5″W	Iuka, West Virginia	Built originally as a one-room school with a Lodge upstairs; a new school was built in 1925, and the Board of Education sold the building to Lodge #329, and the bottom floor (school room) was converted into a country store. The Lodge closed in 1945, when it consolidated with Middlebourne Lodge #69. The building has been abandoned for several years and is in very deteriorated shape.

See also Media related to Odd Fellows buildings in West Virginia at Wikimedia Commons

=== Wisconsin ===
Building	Image	Built	NRHP listed	Location	City, state	Notes
Former Odd Fellows Building		1890s		220 Fourth Avenue West	Ashland, Wisconsin	Romanesque Revival architecture, although re-sided with modern aluminum siding. Currently used as a commercial business building.
Independent Order of Odd Fellows-Lodge No. 189 Building		1887	1999	1335 Main St. 45°5′42″N 87°37′18″W	Marinette, Wisconsin	Late 19th and 20th Century Revivals architecture

See also Media related to Odd Fellows buildings in Wisconsin at Wikimedia Commons

=== Wyoming ===
Building	Image	Built	NRHP listed	Location	City, state	Notes
Odd Fellows Hall (Big Horn, Wyoming)		1894	1980	Jackson St. 44°40′46″N 106°59′27″W	Big Horn, Wyoming	
Odd Fellows Building (Casper, Wyoming)		1952		136 S. Wolcott St. 42°51′5″N 106°19′27″W	Casper, Wyoming	

See also Media related to Odd Fellows buildings in Wyoming at Wikimedia Commons

== Cemeteries ==
Building	Image	estab.	NRHP listed	Location	City, state	Description
Odd Fellows Cemetery (San Francisco, California)		?			San Francisco, California	Former cemetery; location of the Neptune Society Columbarium
Greenlawn Memorial Park (Colma, California)		1933		1100 El Camino Real	Colma, California	In 1933, 26,000 bodies from the Oddfellows Cemetery in San Francisco were moved here. San Francisco had previously passed an ordinance to prohibit the sale of cemetery lots or permit any further burials within the city.
Odd Fellows Cemetery (Sonora, California)		1856			Sonora, California	Currently reported in disrepair.
Odd Fellows Rest Cemetery		1849	1980	Canal Street & City Park Avenue; 29°58′53″N 90°6′39″W	New Orleans, Louisiana	Renaissance architecture, Exotic Revival architecture
Odd Fellows and Confederate Cemetery		?	1988	Corner of Cemetery and Commerce Sts. 33°46′28″N 89°48′39″W	Grenada, Mississippi	Gothic architecture, Romanesque Revival architecture, Classical architecture
Odd Fellows Cemetery (Starkville, Mississippi)		?	1990	Jct. of US 82 and Henderson St. 33°28′0″N 88°49′15″W	Starkville, Mississippi	
Odd Fellows' Cemetery		?		Along Round Bottom Rd. 39°7′38.1″N 84°21′20.5″W	Near Newtown, Ohio	Notable for being site of Odd Fellows' Cemetery Mound, an ancient Indian mound and an NRHP-listed archeological site
Medford IOOF Cemetery		1890	1989	Siskiyou Blvd. at Highland Dr.	Medford, Oregon	Late 19th and 20th Century Revivals architecture, Art Deco architecture, Modernistic architecture
Odd Fellows Cemetery		1849		24th and Diamond Streets; 39°59′12.5″N 75°10′21.99″W	Philadelphia, Pennsylvania	Acquired by the Philadelphia Housing Authority in 1950 for construction of a housing project; burials were re-interred at other Odd Fellows cemeteries
Odd Fellows Cemetery (Clarksville, Tennessee)		1898		North Ford Street; 36°32′55.2″N 87°22′06.8″W	Clarksville, Tennessee	Former Odd Fellows cemetery and Odd Fellows Home site.
Odd Fellows Cemetery Plot (of Mount Hope Cemetery)		about 1900		Along Sanborn Avenue	Ashland, Wisconsin	The Odd Fellows Section, located near the center of Mount Hope Cemetery
Odd Fellows Cemetery		1890		3640 Whittier Blvd, Los Angeles, CA 90023	Los Angeles, CA	In the Boyle Heights, a neighborhood in Los Angeles, California
