= Odd Fellows' Home =

Odd Fellows' Home or Odd Fellows Home may refer to:

in the United States

(by state then city)

- Caldwell Odd Fellow Home for the Aged, Caldwell, Idaho, NRHP-listed
- Odd Fellows' Home (Worcester, Massachusetts), NRHP-listed
- Odd Fellows' Home for Orphans, Indigent and Aged, Springfield, Ohio, NRHP-listed
- Carmen IOOF Home, Carmen, Oklahoma, NRHP-listed
- Oklahoma Odd Fellows Home at Checotah, Checotah, Oklahoma, NRHP-listed
- IOOF Relief Home, Park City, Utah, NRHP-listed

== See also ==
- List of Odd Fellows buildings
- Odd Fellows Hall (disambiguation)
