= Odd Fellows Home of Dell Rapids =

- U.S. National Register of Historic Places
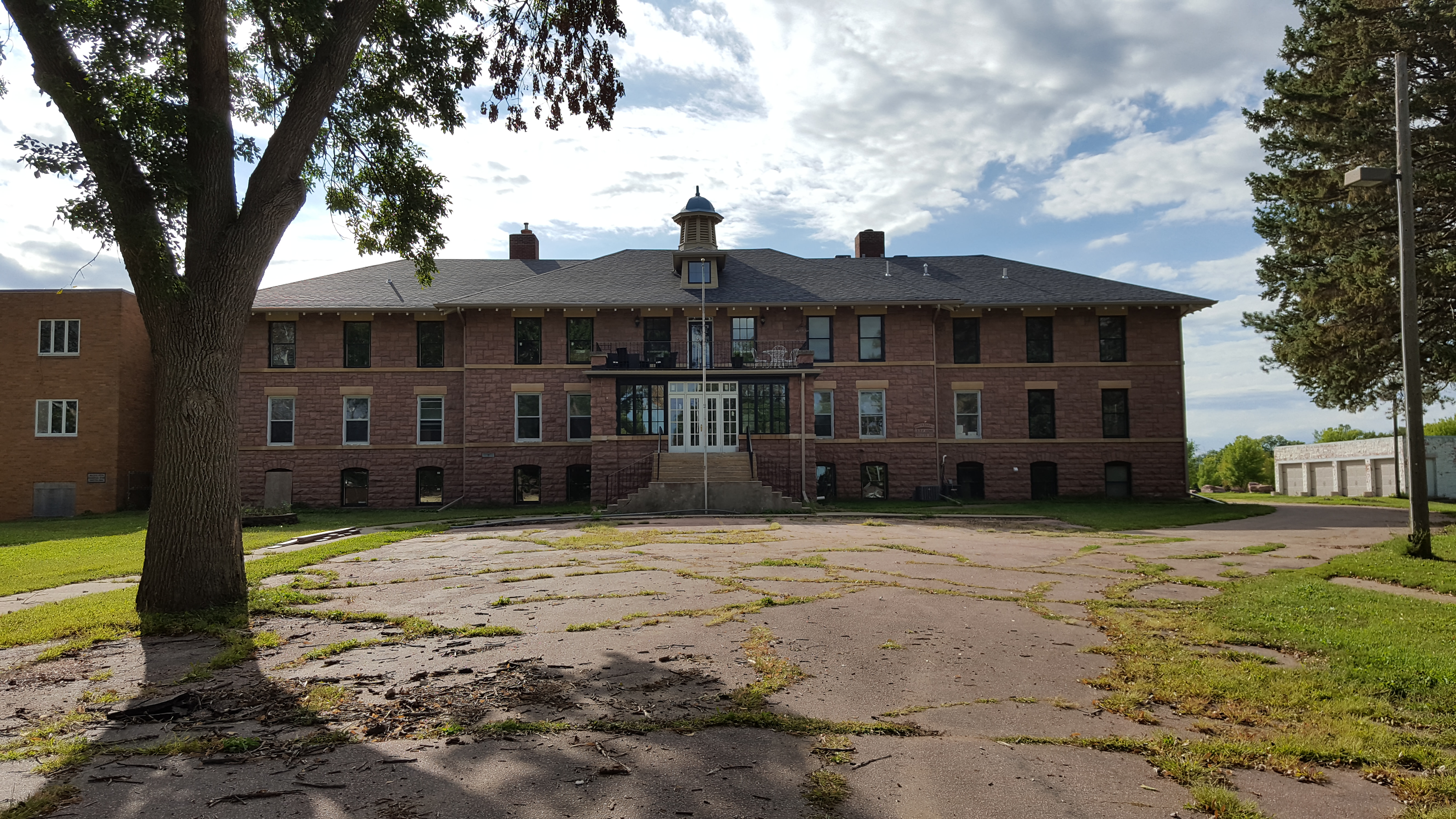
- Odd Fellows Home of Dell Rapids in 2016

- Location within South Dakota Location within the United States
- Location: 100 West 10th Street; Dell Rapids, South Dakota
- Coordinates: 43°49′45.16″N 96°43′06.24″W
- Area: 3.3 acres (1.3 ha)
- Built: 1910
- Architect: Joseph Schwarz
- Architectural style: Renaissance Revival
- NRHP reference No.: 12000037
- Added to NRHP: February 21, 2012

The Odd Fellows Home of Dell Rapids, also known as the I.O.O.F. Home, is a historic Independent Order of Odd Fellows lodge and former orphanage in Dell Rapids, South Dakota. It was listed on the National Register of Historic Places in 2012, with four contributing resources: the main building, a power plant, the front gate, and an apple orchard.
