= I.O.O.F. Hall (Woodbridge, California) =

- U.S. National Register of Historic Places
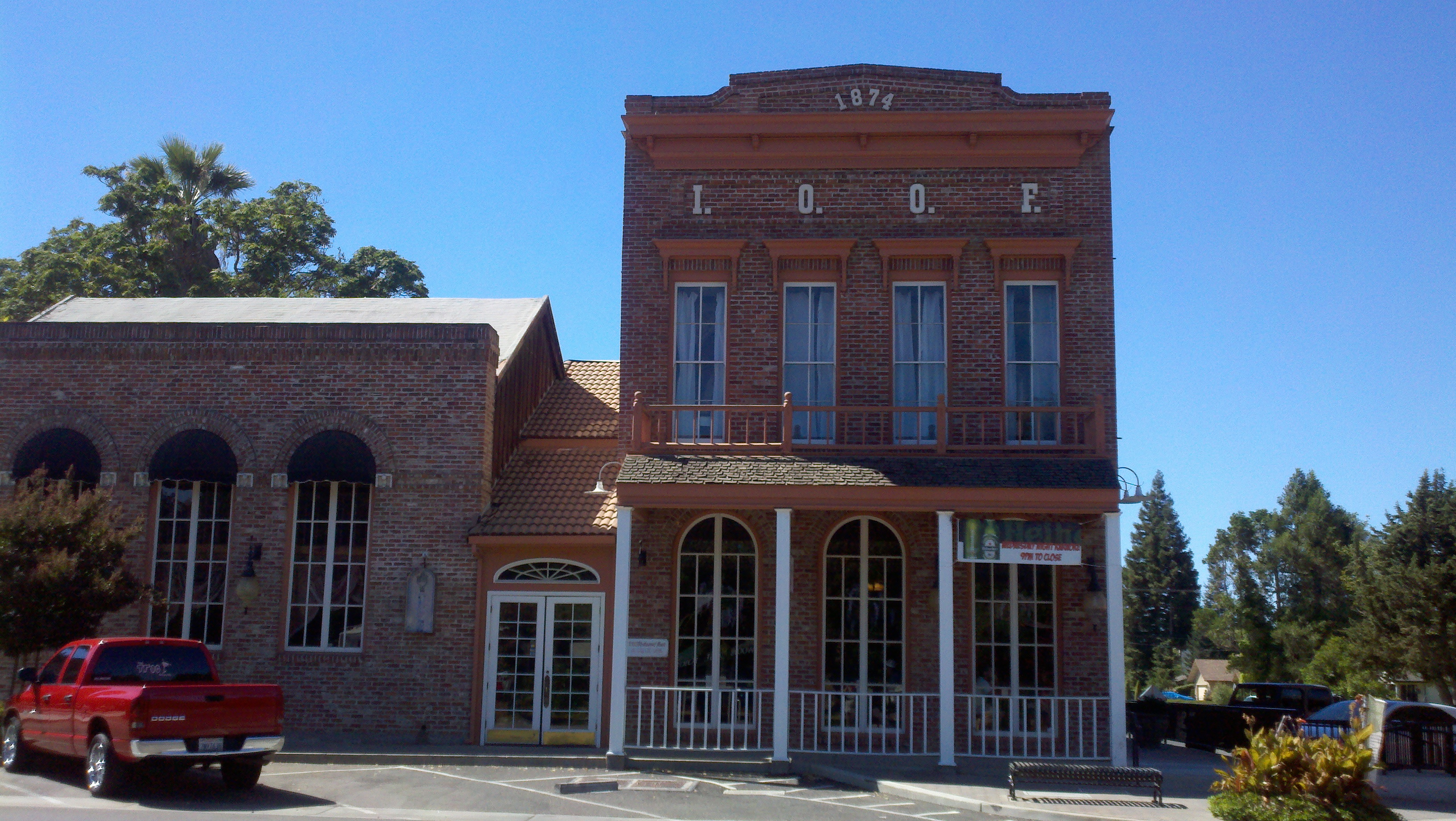

- Location within California Location within the United States
- Location: Main St., Woodbridge, California
- Coordinates: 38°9′17″N 121°17′59″W
- Area: less than one acre
- Built: 1861, 1874
- Architectural style: Early Commercial
- NRHP reference No.: 82002257
- Added to NRHP: April 22, 1982

The I.O.O.F. Hall in Woodbridge, California is a historic Odd Fellows hall and commercial block building that was built in 1861 and expanded in 1874 in Early Commercial architectural style. It served historically as a clubhouse and as a business. It was listed on the National Register of Historic Places in 1982.

It is a two-story brick rectangular block building. Exterior detail on the building, believed to have been wooden, has been lost: an upper cornice, window heads, and a belt course between the two floors. The date "1874" and the letters "I.O.O.F." remain.

It was built as a one-story brick building, the Lavinsky Store, in 1861, then expanded in 1874 to add a second story to accommodate the Odd Fellows' meeting hall.
