= Meeker I.O.O.F. Lodge—Valentine Lodge No. 47 =

- Meeker I.O.O.F. Lodge-Valentine Lodge No. 47
- U.S. National Register of Historic Places
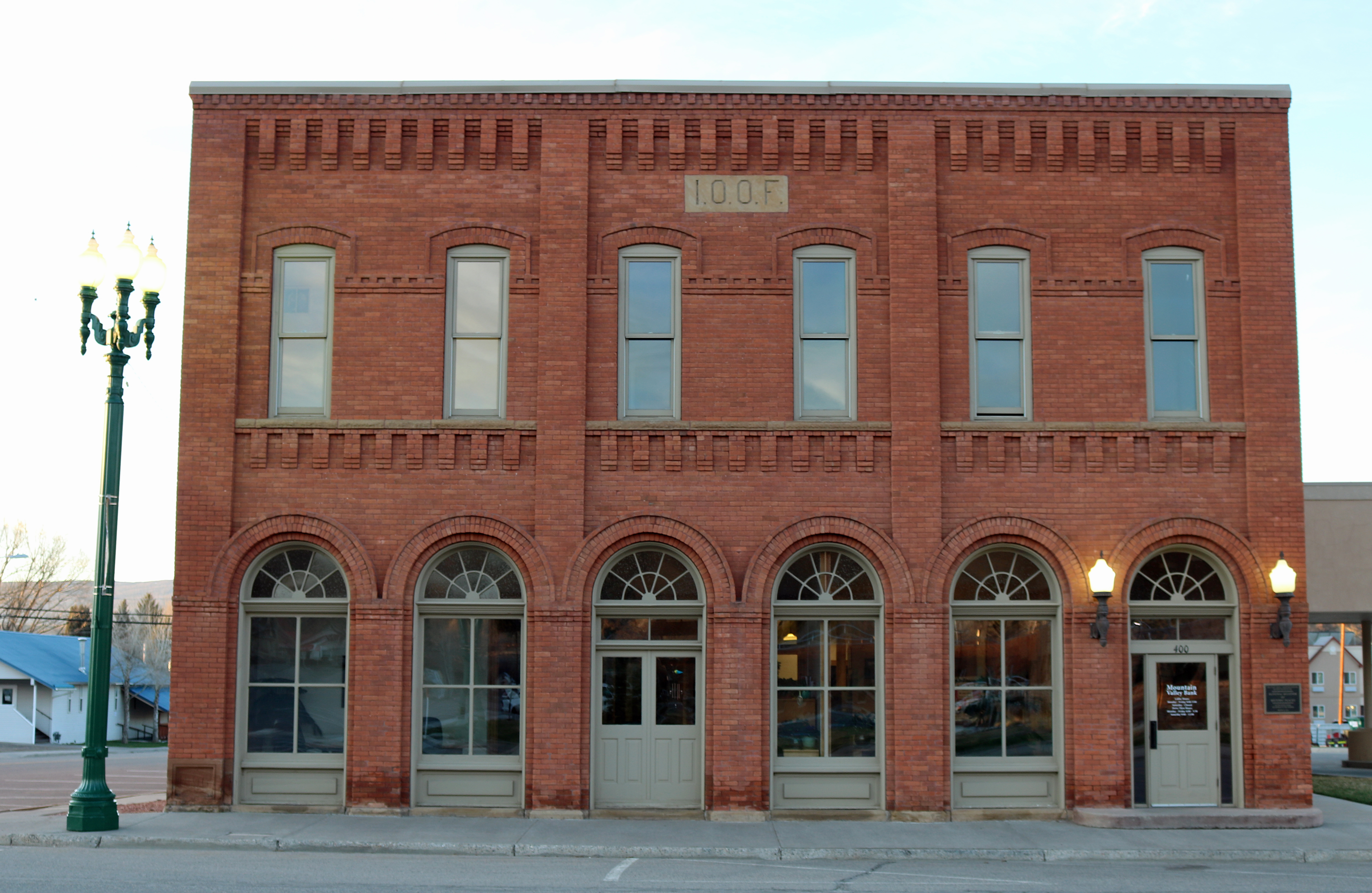

- Location within Colorado
- Location: 400 Main St., Meeker, Colorado
- Coordinates: 40°02′15″N 107°54′40″W
- Area: less than one acre
- Built: 1896-97
- Built by: John Rourke - Brick Contractor; J.H. Beard- Foundation Supervision; E. D. Hayden- Stone Master Mechanic; Harry Niblock- Woodwork
- Architect: Herman Pfeiffer
- NRHP reference No.: 14000060
- Added to NRHP: March 19, 2014

The Meeker I.O.O.F. Lodge—Valentine Lodge No. 47, at 400 Main St. in Meeker, Colorado, was built in 1896. It was listed on the National Register of Historic Places in 2014.

It is a two-story brick building, one of the first such in Meeker, with a one-story section at its rear. The front part was used as a commercial space and other purposes on the first floor, lodge space for the Odd Fellows local group on the second floor; the rear was available as a community room where dances were sometimes held.

It has also been known as Rooney's Hall and as the Star Theatre.

In 2004 the building was purchased by the Mountain Valley Bank, which was renovating it for use as a bank branch.
