= IOOF Opera House =

- U.S. National Register of Historic Places
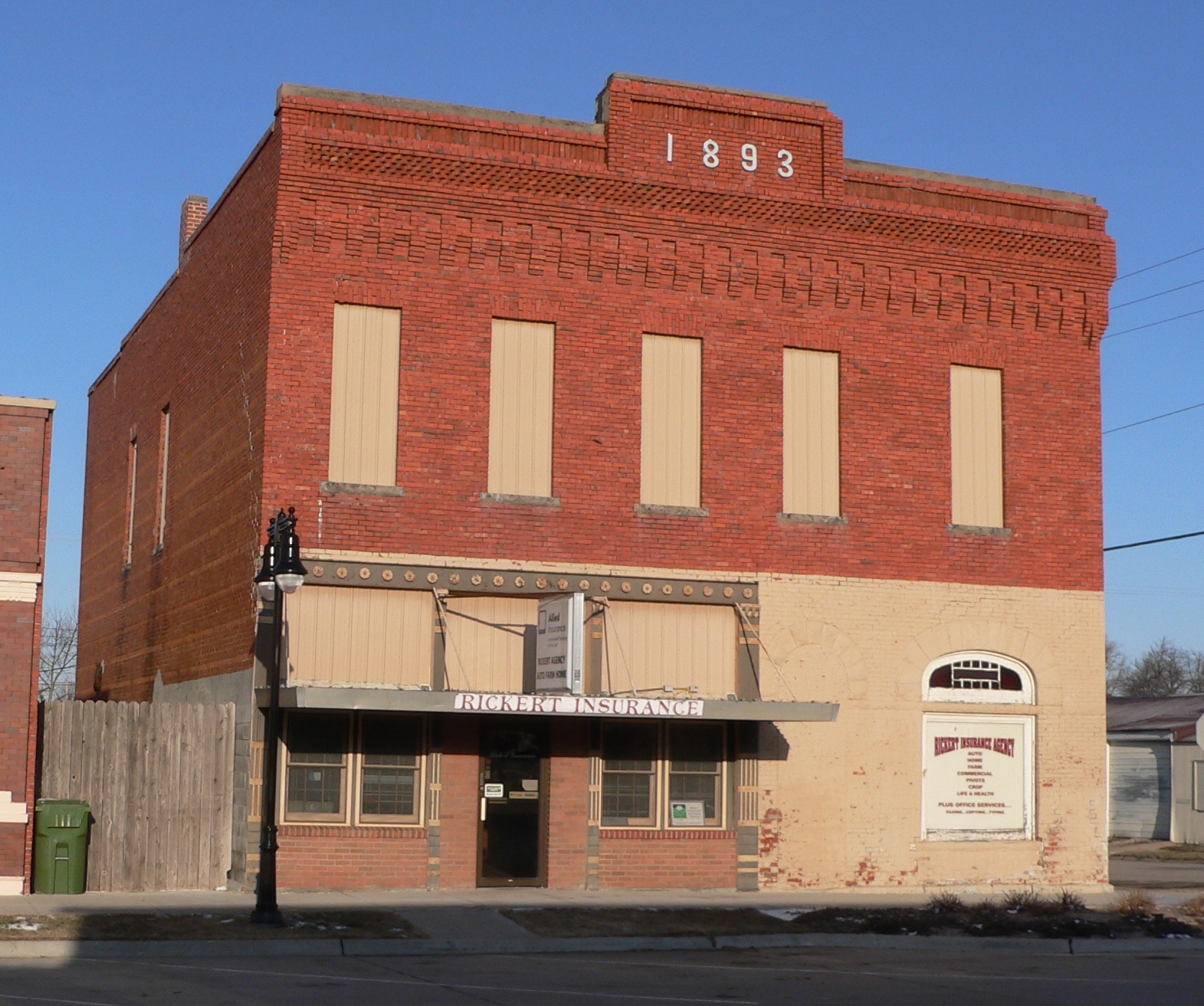

- Location within Nebraska Location within the United States
- Location: N. Third and B Sts., Hampton, Nebraska
- Coordinates: 40°52′46″N 97°53′9″W
- Built: 1880, 1893
- MPS: Opera House Buildings in Nebraska 1867-1917 MPS
- NRHP reference No.: 88000952
- Added to NRHP: September 28, 1988

The IOOF Opera House in Hampton, Nebraska, United States, is a 40-foot (12 m) by 65-foot (20 m) building that was built in 1880 and was leased to the International Order of Odd Fellows (IOOF) chapter in 1893. (Note: The NRHP registration document states once that it was built in 1880, but notes that "1893" is written on the parapet of the building, without explaining the discrepancy.) In 1988, when it was nominated for the National Register of Historic Places, it was the only two-story building in the retail business area of Hampton.

It was deemed significant at the state level in the areas of the performing arts; entertainment/recreation; and social history, as a well-preserved example of an opera house building in Nebraska.

Its decline was partly because Aurora, Nebraska, 6 miles away, and Grand Island, Nebraska, 26 miles away, offered more entertainment choices to car-owning residents.

It is a "two-part commercial block" building that served historically as a meeting hall, as a theater, as a specialty store, as a music facility, and as a financial institution. It was listed on the National Register of Historic Places in 1988.
