= Oddfellows Hall (Auburn, California) =

- U.S. National Register of Historic Places
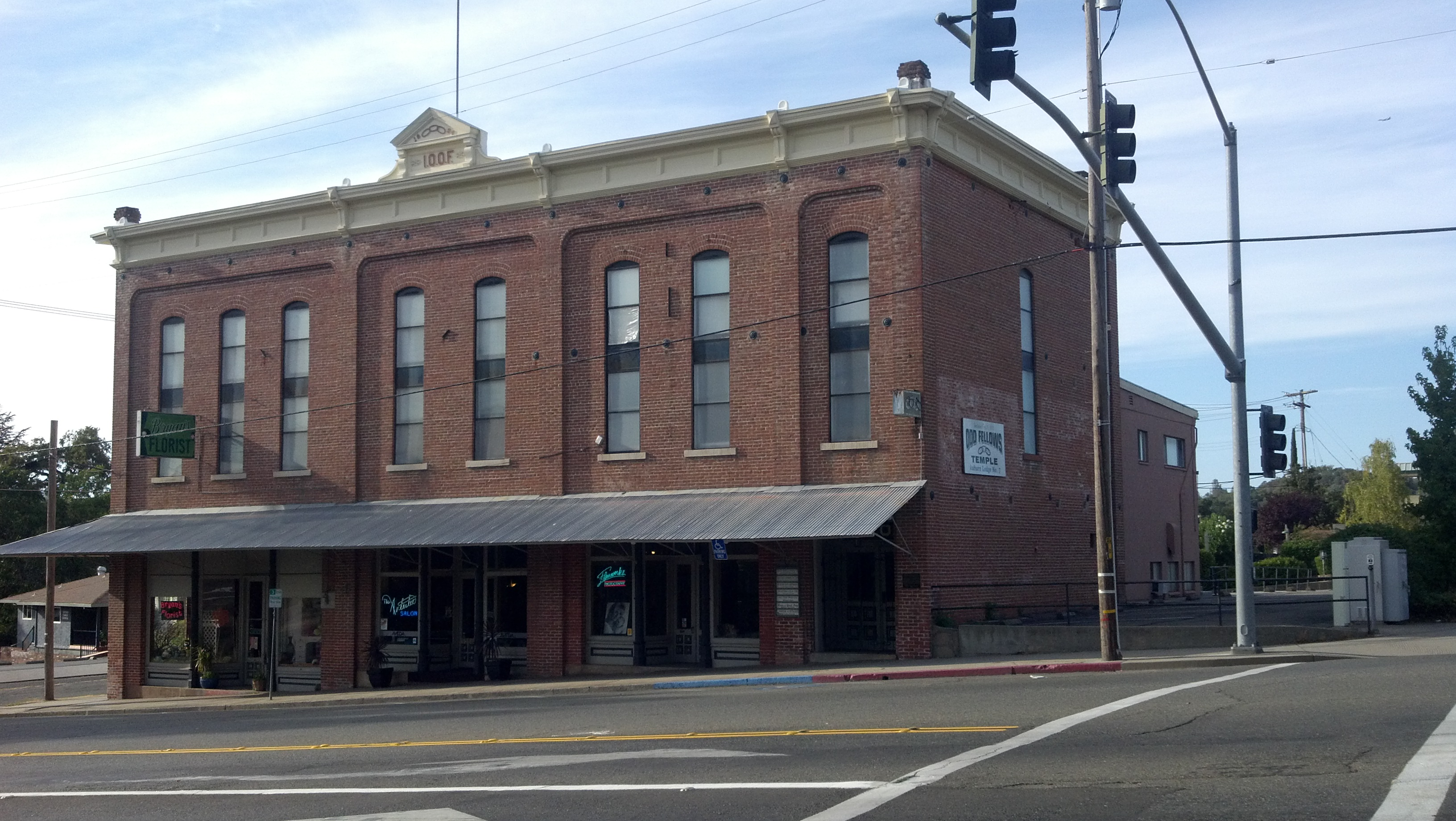

- Location within California
- Location: 1256 Lincoln Way, Auburn, California
- Coordinates: 38.897847°N 121.074972°W
- Area: less than one acre
- Built: 1894
- Built by: Henry T. Holmes
- Architectural style: Italianate
- MPS: Auburn, CA MPS
- NRHP reference No.: 11000940
- Added to NRHP: December 19, 2011

The Oddfellows Hall in Auburn, California, at 1256 Lincoln Way, was built in 1894. It was listed on the National Register of Historic Places in 2011.

It is a three-story red brick Italianate home of IOOF Lodge No. 7, founded in 1852. Henry T. Holmes, builder of the Hall, was a '49er and a founding father of Auburn.
