= Odd Fellows Lodge and Temple =

- U.S. National Register of Historic Places
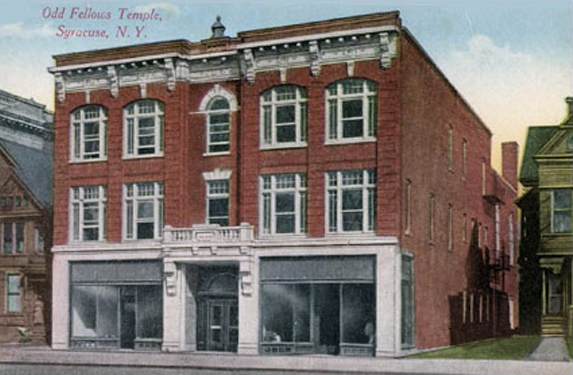
- 1915 postcard image

- Location within New York Location within the United States
- Location: 212 Ash St., 823 N. Townsend St., Syracuse, New York
- Coordinates: 43°03′34.6″N 76°09′04.0″W
- Area: 0.16 acres (0.065 ha)
- Built: 1887, 1892
- Architectural style: Romanesque Revival
- NRHP reference No.: 14000128
- Added to NRHP: April 7, 2014

Odd Fellows Lodge and Temple, also known as the Lincoln Lodge, is a historic Odd Fellows Lodge located near Downtown Syracuse, Onondaga County, New York. It was built in 1887, and is a three-story, Romanesque Revival style brick building. It features decorative brickwork and was expanded before 1892. It housed a public library on the first floor, lodge related dwellings on the second floor, and the Odd Fellows meeting hall on the third. It was originally a German-speaking Lodge and vacated the building in 1945.

It was listed on the National Register of Historic Places in 2014.
