= I.O.O.F. Building (Idaho Falls, Idaho) =

- U.S. National Register of Historic Places
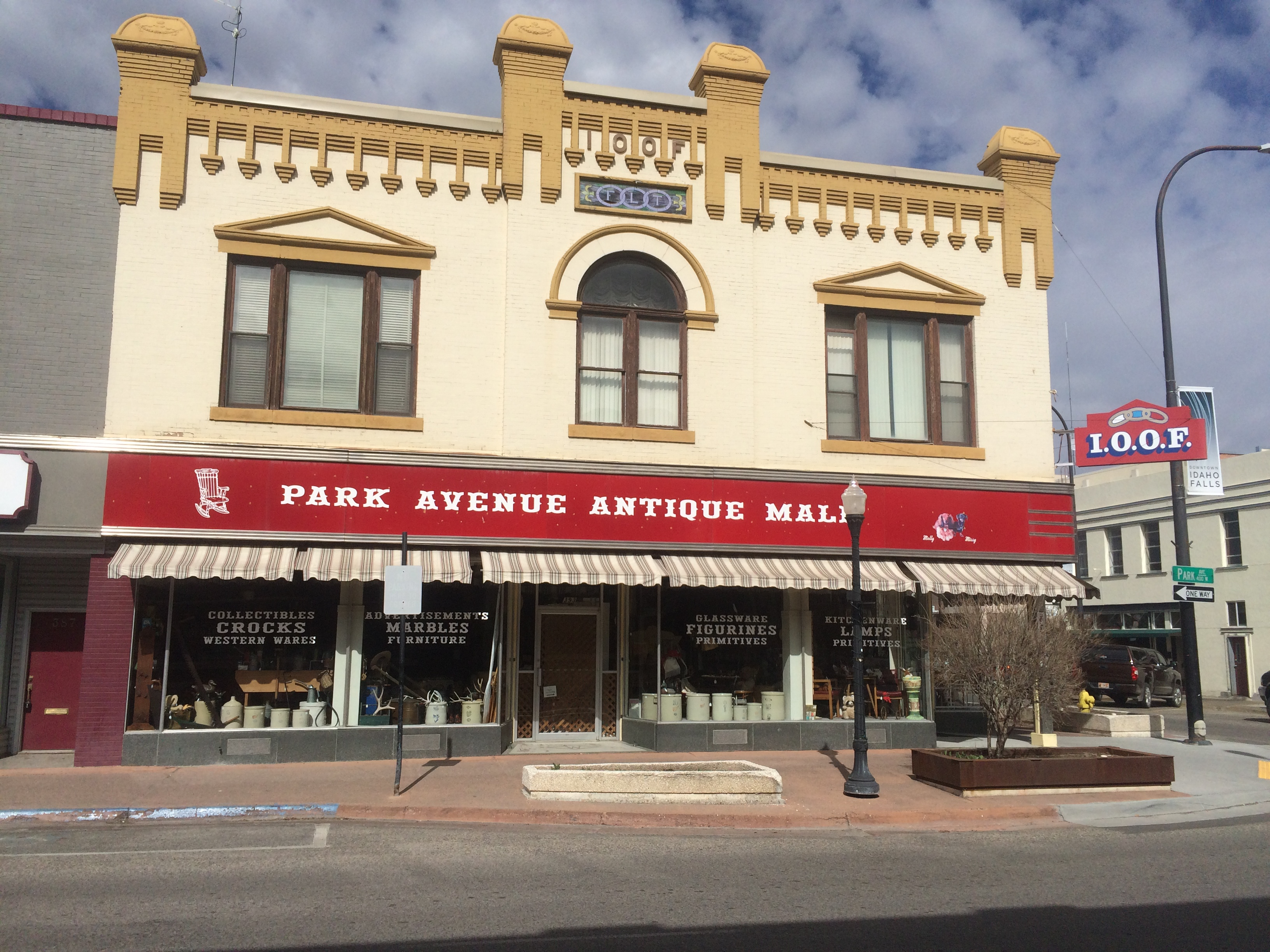

- Location within Idaho Location within the United States
- Location: 393 N. Park Ave., Idaho Falls, Idaho
- Coordinates: 43°29′33.1″N 112°2′27.1″W
- Area: less than one acre
- Built: c.1909
- Architectural style: Romanesque Revival
- MPS: Idaho Falls Downtown MRA
- NRHP reference No.: 84001090
- Added to NRHP: August 30, 1984

The I.O.O.F. Building is a building in Idaho Falls, Idaho, United States. It was built in Romanesque Revival style in c.1909, and served historically as a clubhouse for the local International Order of Odd Fellows chapter, which was formed by 1892.

The building was listed on the National Register of Historic Places in 1984.

It is one of a number of Idaho Falls buildings studied in 1984 and listed on the National Register. The Hasbrouck Building is the one other relatively pure Romanesque Revival building in that group.
