= Independent Order of Odd Fellows-Lodge No. 189 Building =

- Independent Order of Odd Fellows--Lodge #189 Building
- U.S. National Register of Historic Places
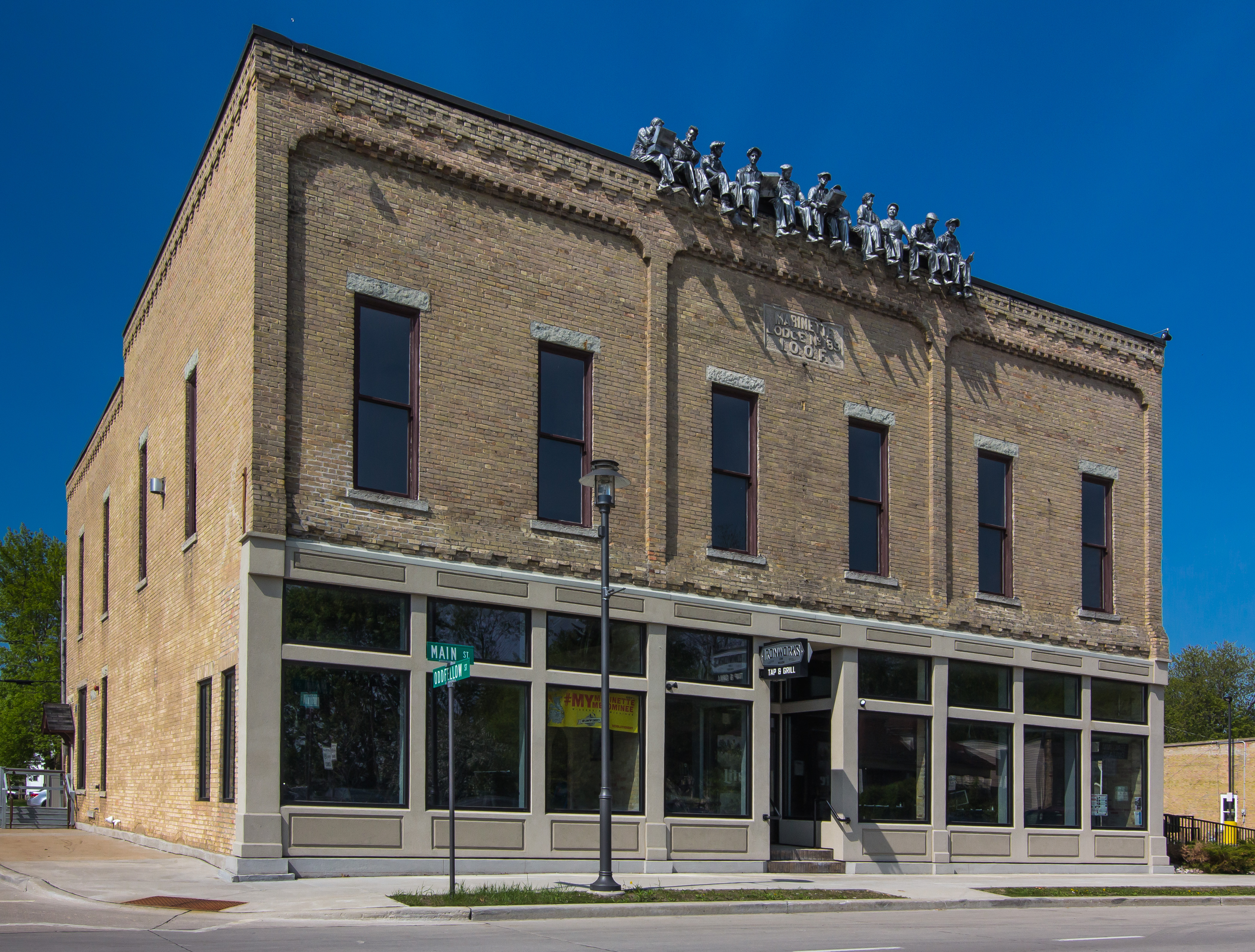

- Location within Wisconsin Location within the United States
- Location: 1335 Main St. Marinette, Wisconsin
- Coordinates: 45°5′42″N 87°37′18″W
- Area: less than one acre
- Built: 1887
- Architectural style: Late 19th and 20th Century Revivals
- NRHP reference No.: 98001597
- Added to NRHP: January 7, 1999

The Independent Order of Odd Fellows-Lodge No. 189 Building, in Marinette, Wisconsin, was built in 1887. It was listed on the National Register of Historic Places in 1999. It served historically as a meeting hall and as a restaurant.

It's a two-story cream-city brick commercial building with stone and brick details. It has a shed roof behind a modest projecting parapet. Its second story has six bays; its first floor historically was three storefronts divided by two-story brick piers. All of its historic windows are approximately 7 feet (2.1 m) tall by 3 feet (0.91 m) wide and have original one-over-one double hung windows.
