= Odd Fellows Hall (Baltimore, 1891) =

Historic building in Maryland, USA

- U.S. National Register of Historic Places
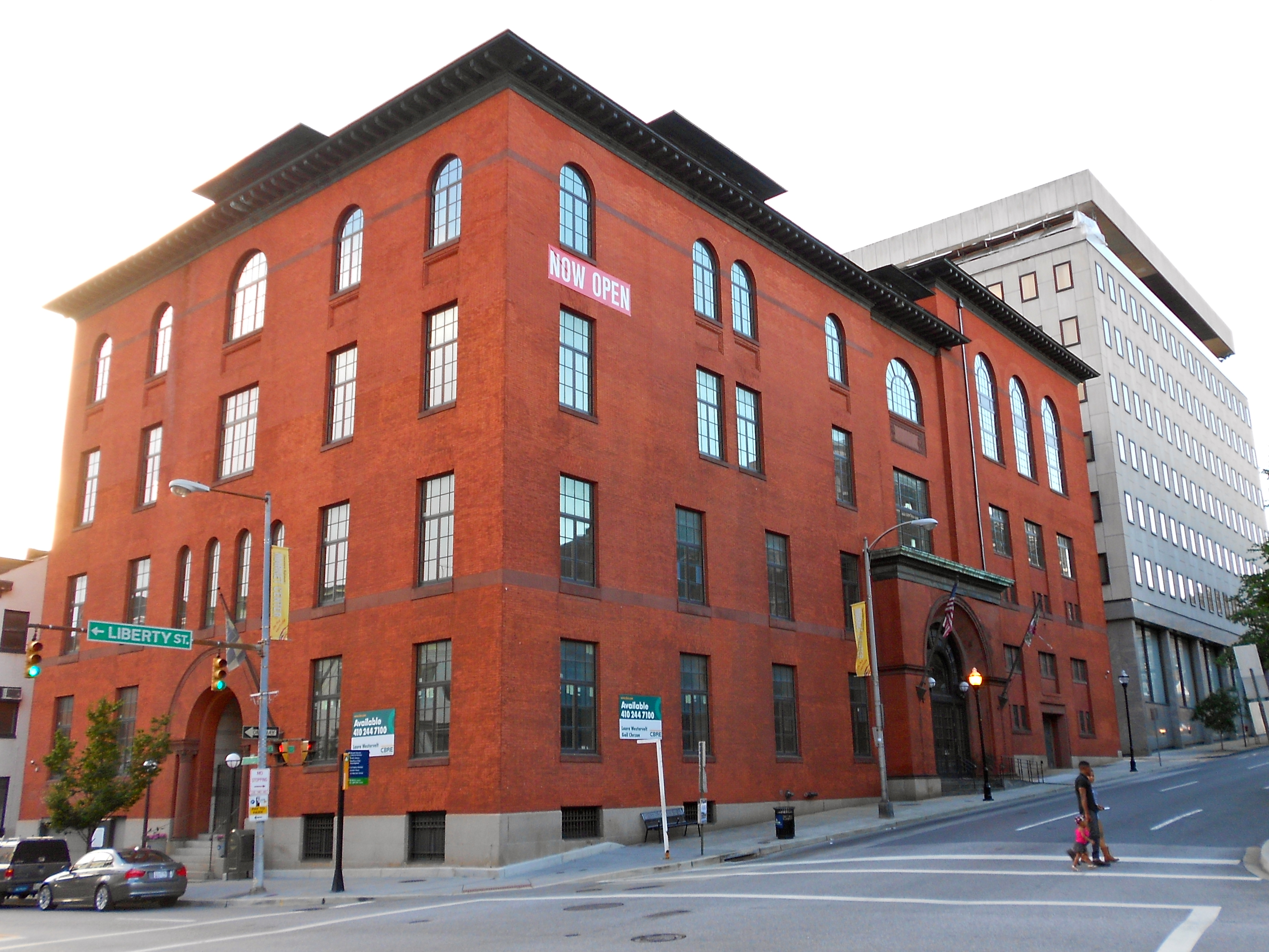
- Odd Fellows Hall, May 2012

- Location within Baltimore Location within Maryland Location within the United States
- Location: 300 Cathedral St., Baltimore, Maryland
- Coordinates: 39°17′35.7″N 76°37′1.2″W
- Area: 0.3 acres (0.12 ha)
- Built: 1891
- Architect: Davis, Frank E.
- Architectural style: Romanesque
- NRHP reference No.: 80001789
- Added to NRHP: March 25, 1980

The Odd Fellows Hall in Baltimore, Maryland, United States, is a historic building that was the meeting place of the Independent Order of Odd Fellows fraternal organization, and is now an apartment building. It was built in 1891 and is a five bay structure featuring a central arched entrance with brownstone Romanesque columns and architraves. In the late 1970s, an adaptive reuse project retained most of its exterior architectural character while providing modern office space in the renovated interior.

Odd Fellows Hall was listed on the National Register of Historic Places in 1982.
