= Odd Fellows Hall (Portsmouth, Ohio) =

- U.S. National Register of Historic Places
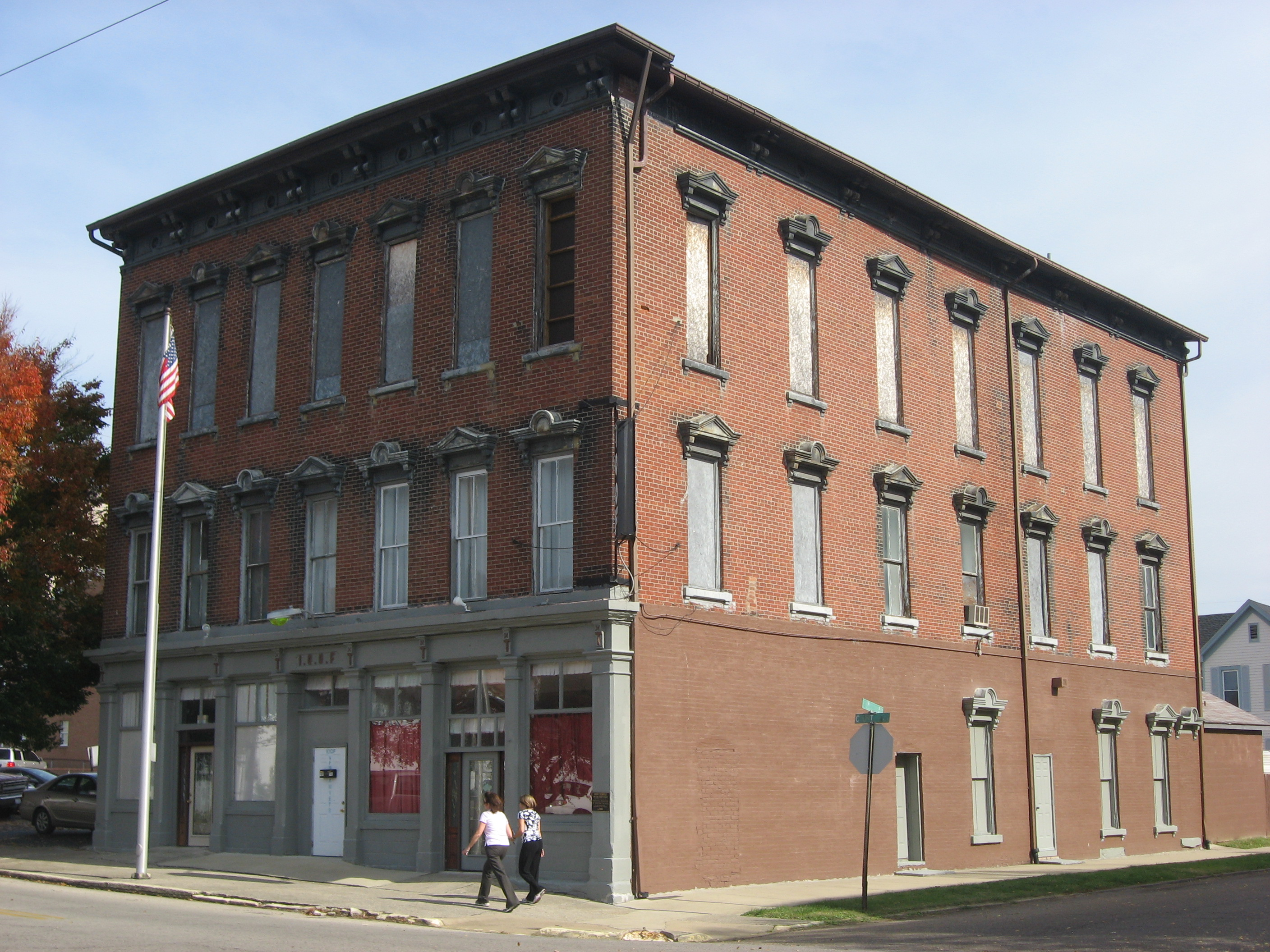
- Front and southern side

- Location within Ohio Location within the United States
- Location: 500-506 Court St., Portsmouth, Ohio
- Coordinates: 38°44′3″N 83°0′2″W
- Area: Less than 1 acre (0.40 ha)
- Built: 1871
- Architectural style: Italianate
- NRHP reference No.: 87002090
- Added to NRHP: December 8, 1987

The Odd Fellows Hall in Portsmouth, Ohio is an Odd Fellows building.

It was built in 1871 in Italianate style. It served historically as a meeting hall. It was listed on the National Register of Historic Places in 1987. The Orient Lodge No. 337, Independent Order of Odd Fellows, no longer owns this building and property; Charles Euton Real Estate now owns it. Orient Lodge No. 337, Independent Order of Odd Fellows, was declared defunct on April 28, 2023, following the failure of Secretary John Burgess to submit the 2022 Annual Report to the Grand Lodge of Ohio. For many years, the members were striving to keep this lodge going and had a lack of interest from the community for them to get new members for their lodge. All this lodge was more worried about was having members to play poker and wasn’t even worried about keeping this lodge open to get new members.

Scioto Lodge No. 31 consolidated with Orient Lodge No. 337 in 1985, strengthening its membership and continuing its fraternal work. Orient Lodge No. 337 was originally instituted on June 2, 1858, and served the community for more than 160 years.

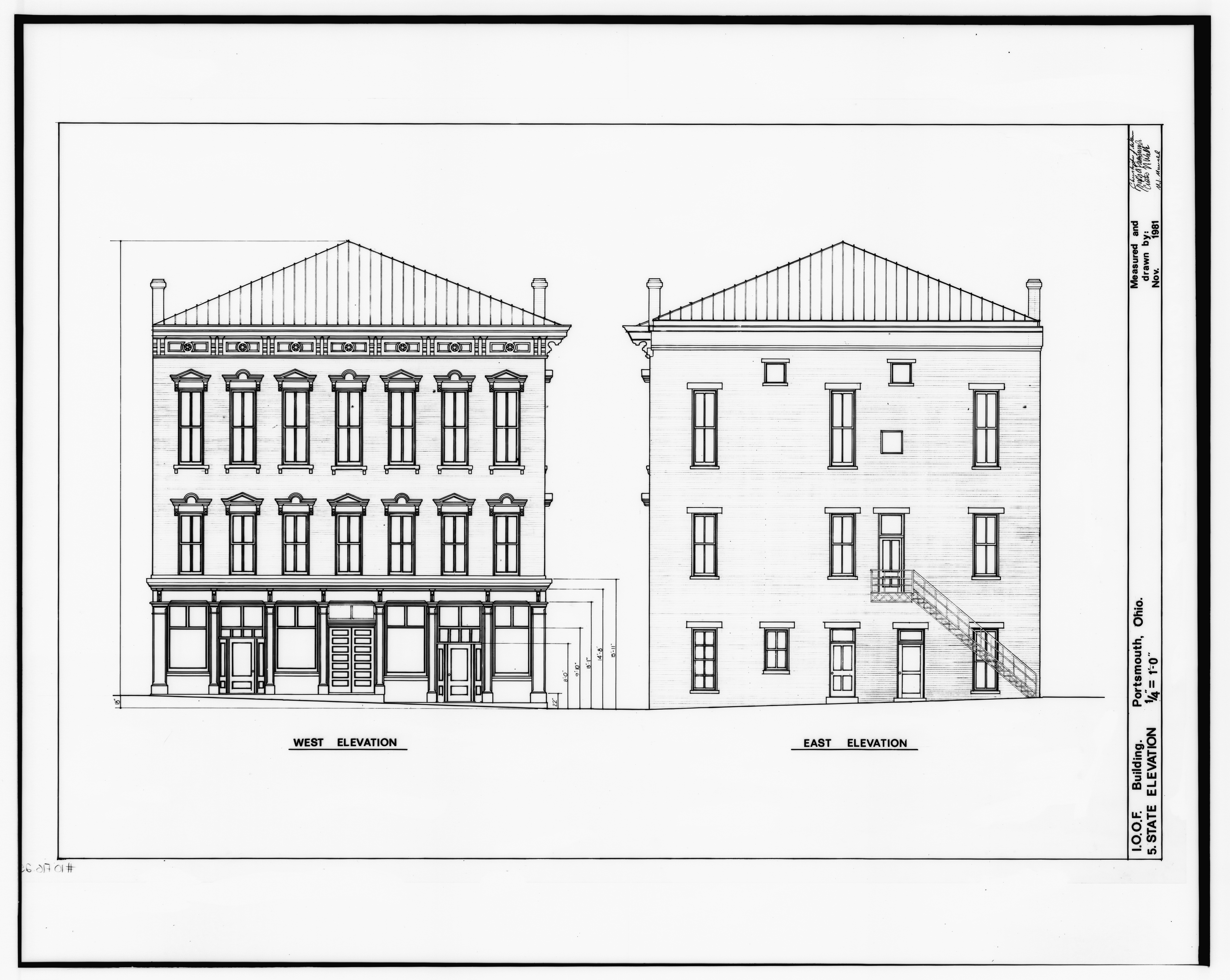
West and east elevations, HABS drawings

It is a three-story building on the corner of Fifth Street and Court Street and has a projecting cornice.

It was built in 1880 by the local I.O.O.F. chapter (Scioto Lodge No. 31), which was chartered on June 5th, 1844. It is notable as a rare surviving example in Portsmouth of an intact Italianate commercial building. Doorways and windows on its first floor are set off by stone columns that appear to be Tuscan order, which support a plain entablature. On January 1, 1987, it was transferred over to the Orient Lodge No. 337, On January 21, 2009, Howard and Kathryn Sanford purchased it. On March 21, 2012, it was purchased by Sonny Rentals LLC. On June 15, 2017, it was turned over to Sonny Rentals LLC. and on January 16, 2019, it was turned over to Board of County Commissioners.
