= Odd Fellows Hall (Alexandria, Virginia) =

Historic building in Virginia, US

- U.S. National Register of Historic Places
- Virginia Landmarks Register
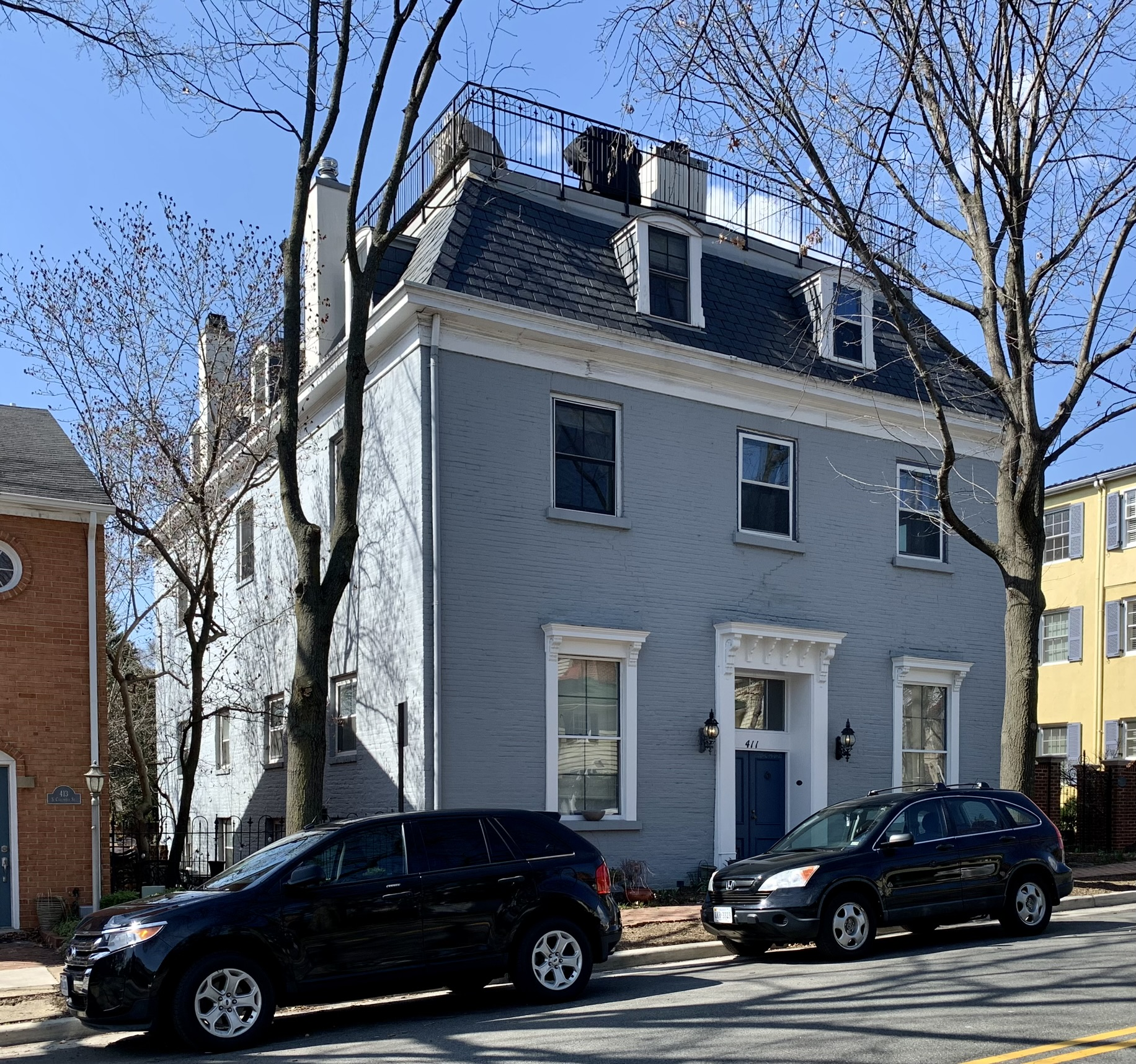
- Odd Fellows Hall in March 2022

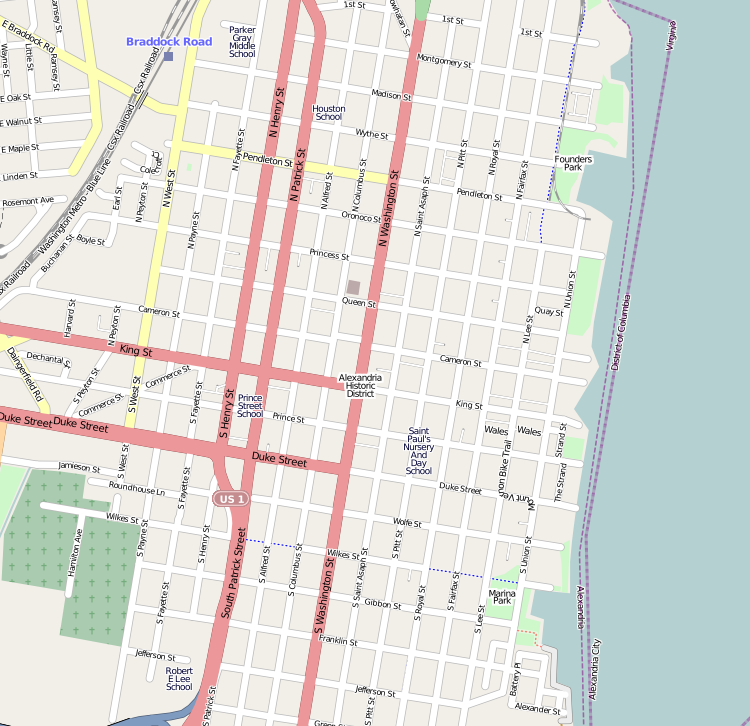
- Location within Alexandria Historical District
- Location: 411 S. Columbus St., Alexandria, Virginia
- Coordinates: 38°48′11.3″N 77°2′57.24″W
- Architect: Seaton, George L.
- Architectural style: Second Empire
- MPS: African American Historic Resources of Alexandria, Virginia MPS
- NRHP reference No.: 03001427
- VLR No.: 100-5015-0005

Significant dates
- Added to NRHP: January 16, 2004
- Designated VLR: September 10, 2003

Odd Fellows Hall is a historic Odd Fellows hall located at Alexandria, Virginia. It is a 2 1/2-story, brick building. It was built in 1864 as a one-story building, and expanded to its present size in 1870. African-American orders like the black Odd Fellows allowed blacks to socialize and put their skills to good use. In 1870, black builder and politician George Seaton was hired to build the Odd Fellows meeting hall in Alexandria, Virginia. For decades the building was used to house the group and many of the social gatherings of the African-American community. In the 1980s the building was converted into condominiums. It is a three-story brick building with decorative detailing and a slate mansard roof. The hall is currently a residential building.
