= I.O.O.F. – Paris Fair Building =

- U.S. National Register of Historic Places
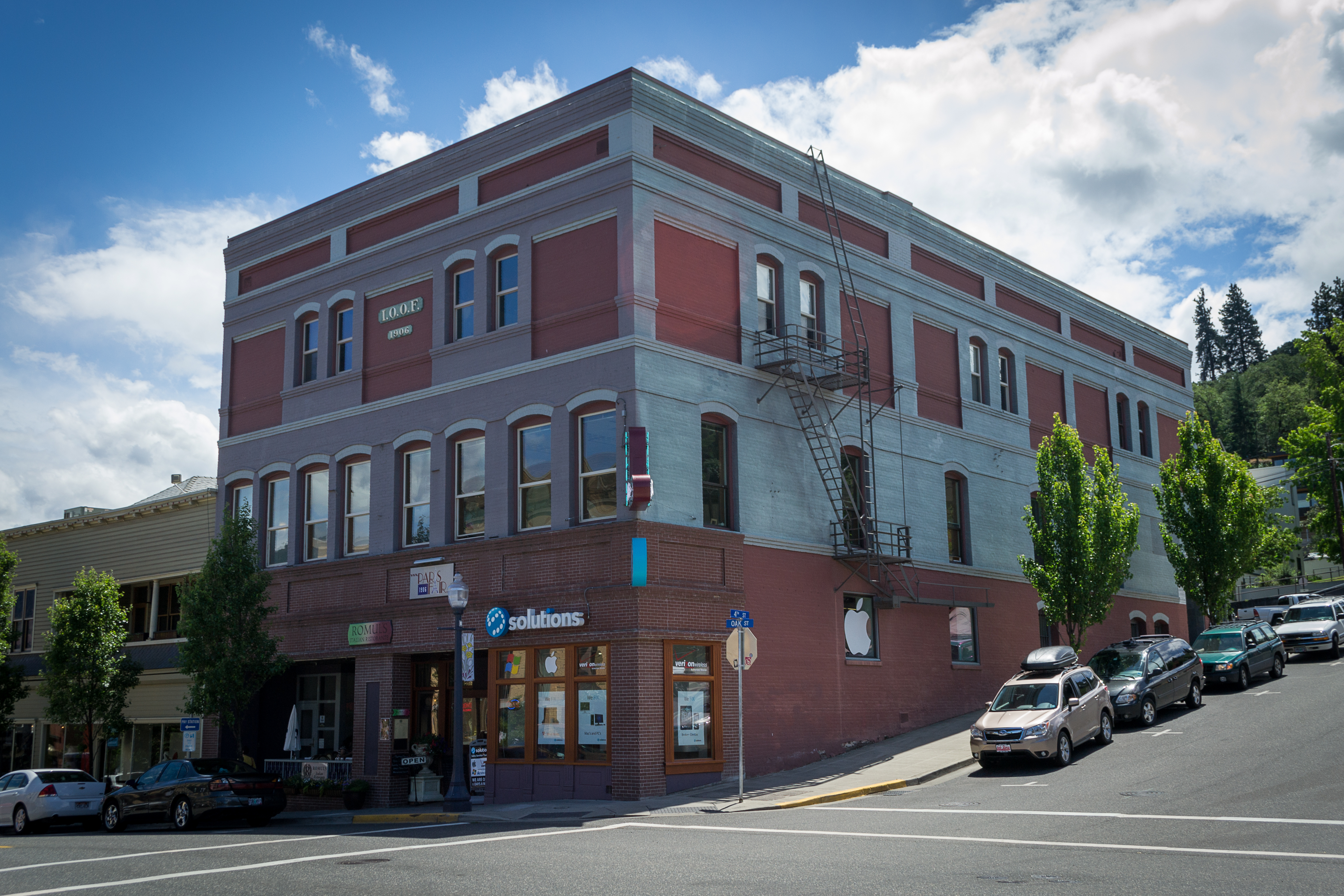
- The I.O.O.F. – Paris Fair Building in 2013

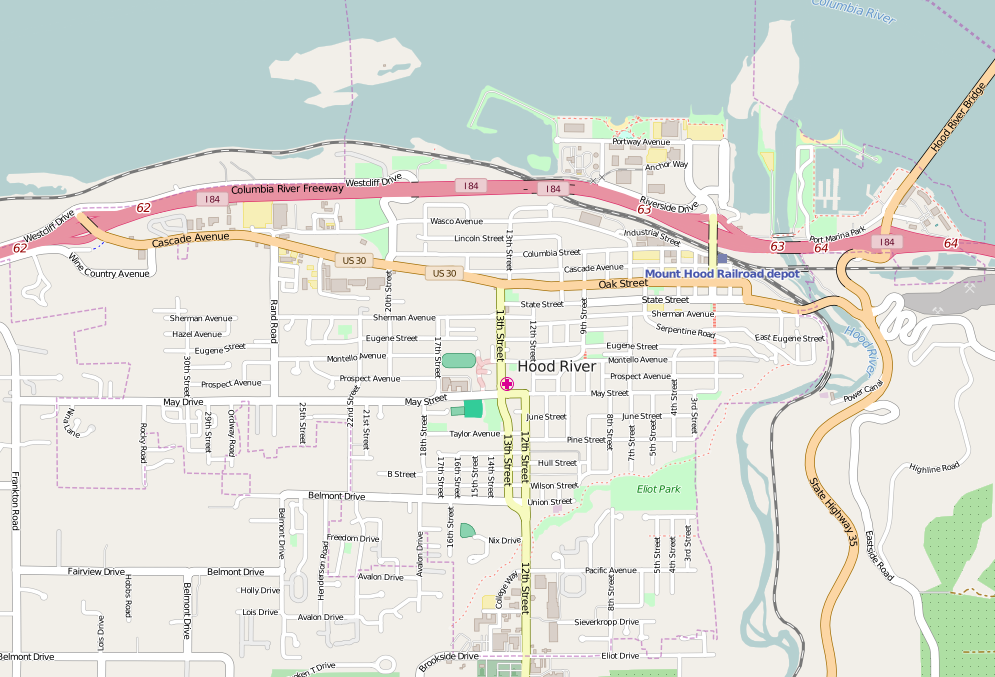
- Location within Hood River OR Location within Oregon Location within the United States
- Location: 315 Oak Street; Hood River, Oregon
- Coordinates: 45°42′30″N 121°31′18″W
- Area: 0.2 acres (0.081 ha)
- Built: 1906
- Architect: Paul M. Hall-Lewis
- Architectural style: Early Commercial
- NRHP reference No.: 90001598
- Added to NRHP: October 25, 1990

The I.O.O.F. – Paris Fair Building in Hood River, Oregon was built in 1906, with Early Commercial architecture. Also known as Idlewild Lodge No. 107, Odd Fellow's Hall, and Paris Fair Department Store, it served historically as a department store and as an International Order of Odd Fellows meeting hall. It was listed on the National Register of Historic Places in 1990.

Its third floor was originally the lodge hall.
