= Enterprise I.O.O.F. Hall =

- Enterprise IOOF Hall
- U.S. National Register of Historic Places
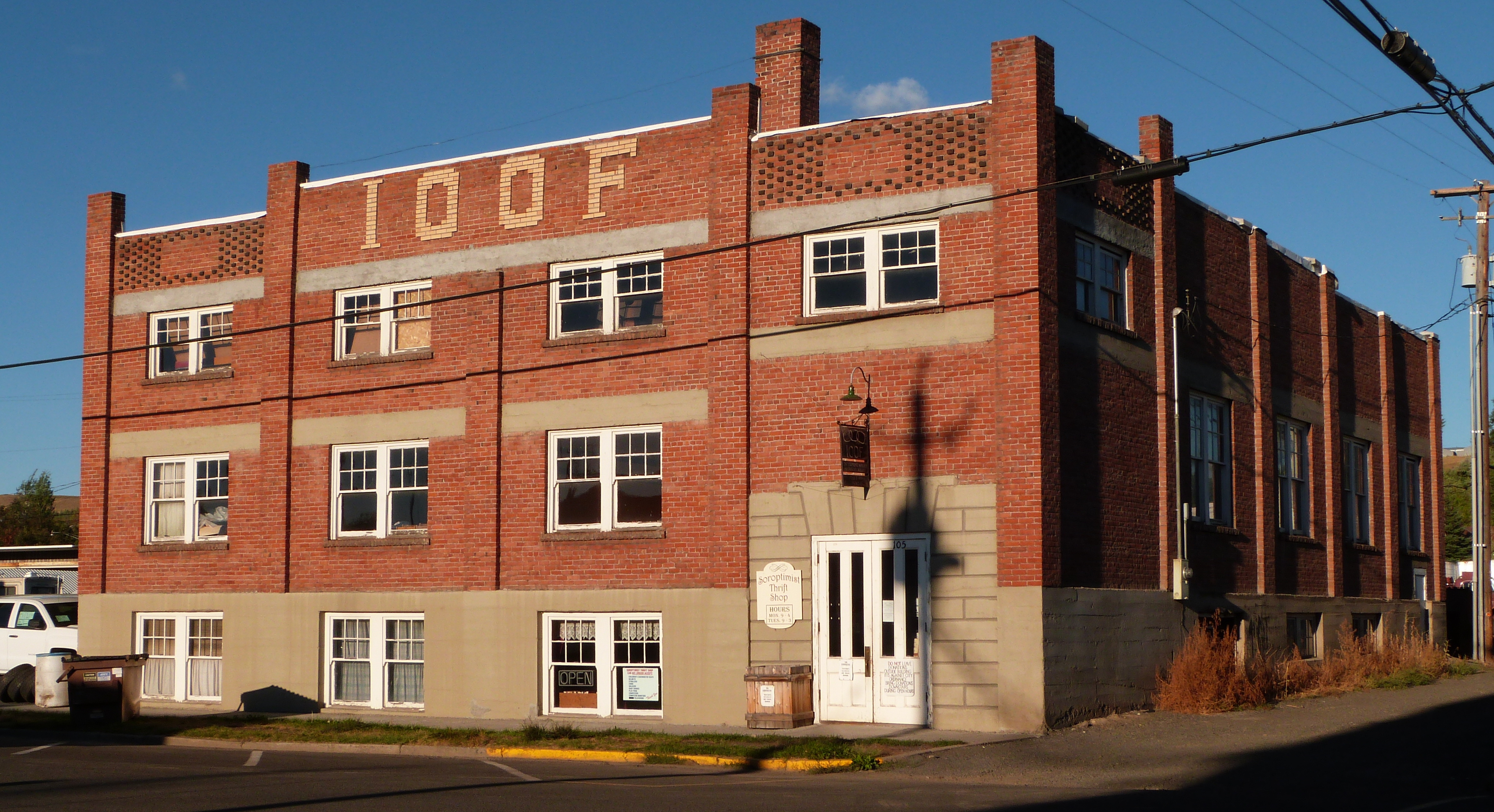

- Location within Oregon Location within the United States
- Location: 105 NE 1st Street, Enterprise, Oregon
- Coordinates: 45°25′34″N 117°16′33″W
- Built: 1920
- MPS: Downtown Enterprise Multiple Property Submission
- NRHP reference No.: 12000083
- Added to NRHP: March 7, 2012

The Enterprise IOOF Hall, at 105 NE 1st Street in Enterprise, Oregon, is a historic building built in 1920 that was listed on the U.S. National Register of Historic Places in 2012, along with two others recommended by Oregon's State Advisory Committee on Historic Preservation in October, 2011. The building served as a meeting hall for Enterprise's chapter of the Independent Order of Odd Fellows.

The building was deemed significant for having served as a social center for the community and as "a symbol of the importance [IOOF lodges] once had in the welfare of the community before social service aid was available."
