= Nathan Comstock Jr. House =

Historic house in New York, United States

- U.S. National Register of Historic Places
- Nathan Comstock Jr. House, July 2015

- Location within New York Location within the United States
- Location: 299 Old Niagara Rd., Lockport, New York
- Coordinates: 43°11′14″N 78°40′47″W
- Area: about 5 acres (2.0 ha)
- Built: c. 1823-1829, c. 1907
- Architectural style: Greek Revival
- MPS: Stone Buildings of Lockport, New York MPS
- NRHP reference No.: 11000707
- Added to NRHP: September 29, 2011

The Nathan Comstock Jr. House (also known as the Odd Fellows Orphanage) is a historic house located at 299 Old Niagara Road in Lockport, Niagara County, New York.

== Description and history ==
The home is one of the first stone houses built in Lockport between 1823 and 1829, and is a two-story, five-bay wide dwelling built of native limestone in a vernacular Greek Revival style. It has an overhanging side gable roof. The original house was built of excess stone excavated for the Erie Canal. The house was said to have been a part of the Underground Railroad, with many runaway slaves using it as refuge. In about 1900, a large, two-story, rear brick wing was added to accommodate orphaned children of the Independent Order of Odd Fellows members. From 1907 to 1944, the building was used as the Odd Fellows Orphanage. It is believed that the Niagara grape was developed on a portion of the over 800 acre Comstock farm, sold to Obadiah P. Hoag about 1825. Claudius L. Hoag, son of Obadiah traveled to Canada to learn how to hybridize grapes. The house and farm was sold to former Congressman Lewis Eaton in 1830. The house had been abandoned from the 1980s until about 2011, when the current owners renovated it. It won the Preservation Award from Preservation Buffalo Niagara.

It was listed on the National Register of Historic Places on September 29, 2011.
