= Wyandotte Odd Fellows Temple =

- U.S. National Register of Historic Places
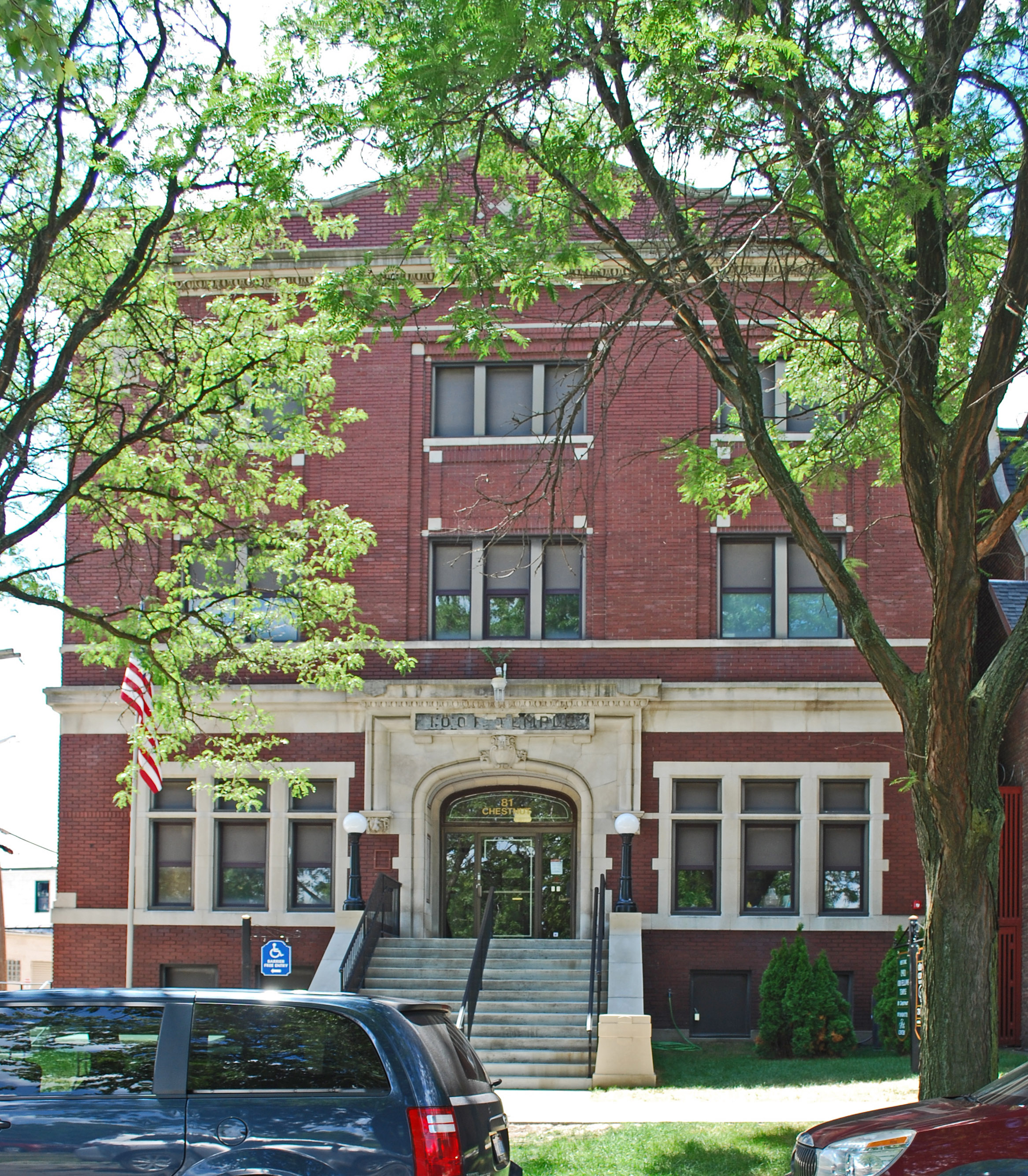

- Location within Michigan Location within the United States
- Map showing the location of Wyandotte Odd Fellows Temple
- Location: 81 Chestnut St., Wyandotte, Michigan
- Coordinates: 42°12′19″N 83°8′58″W
- Area: 0.9 acres (0.36 ha)
- Built: 1911
- Built by: Robert C. Hugh
- Architectural style: Commercial Style
- NRHP reference No.: 09000527
- Added to NRHP: July 16, 2009

The Wyandotte Odd Fellows Temple is a community building located at 81 Chestnut Street in Wyandotte, Michigan. It was listed on the National Register of Historic Places in 2009. As of 2010, the building serves as the Wyandotte Arts Center.

== History ==
Wyandotte's Independent Order of Odd Fellows (IOOF) Lodge 172 was established in 1871 by men employed at the Eureka Iron and Steel Works. In 1893, IOOF Lodge 172 purchased the "Old Brown School," an 1856 school building that was once located at this site, to hold meetings. However, by 1910, the IOOF membership had outgrown the school building and the school was moved. Construction on the current building began in 1911. Financing issues caused the construction to be done in phases; the basement and first floor were built in 1911-1912 and the building opened for use. Over the next eight years, membership in the Wyandotte IOOF grew steadily (from 240 in 1912 to 780 in 1920), and in 1921 the upper stories of the building, containing an auditorium, were constructed.

The Wyandotte Odd Fellows used the building until 1938, when financial difficulties caused foreclosure on the building. It was leased by the state of Michigan for a few years, but in 1942 the Wyandotte Masons purchased the building. The Masons moved in in 1943, and in 1948 extensively renovated the building. The Masons used the building until 2005, when the local Masons merged with another chapter. After the Masons vacated, the building was briefly used as a church. In 2008 the city of Wyandotte purchased the building to preserve the structure. The Wyandotte Arts Center, containing exhibition, studio space, and theatre space opened in the building in 2010.

== Description ==
The Wyandotte Odd Fellows Temple is a rectangular three-story Commercial Style brick building with Neoclassical and Renaissance stylistic elements, measuring approximately 50 feet by 120 feet. The main facade is built of dark red brick, with a limestone stringcourse, cornice, and parapet. The raised front entrance, reached by a split staircase, is surrounded by decorative detailing. On the first floor, two groups of three windows flank the entrance. On the second and third floors, there are single groups of three windows in the center above the entryway, and groups of two windows to each side. A low gable tops the facade.

On the interior, the entryway leads to a foyer with grand staircase. In addition to the foyer, the first floor contains administrative office, ticket office space, ladies and men's restrooms, anteroom, check room and lodge rooms, in the same configuration as originally constructed. The foyer and administrative office contain original, unpainted wood trim and doors. The second floor houses a large auditorium with balconies along three sides and a stage on the fourth. The stage opening was walled up in 1948. The auditorium features extensive ornate plastering, and stairs leading up to the balcony level. Behind the stage are a number of dressing and storage rooms. The basement was originally a fellowship space, and contains a cafeteria, a kitchen, billiard room, and other recreational spaces, as well as bathrooms and spaces for mechanicals.
