= Tell City Oddfellows' Hall =

- Hall of Tell City Lodge, No. 206, IOOF
- Formerly listed on the U.S. National Register of Historic Places
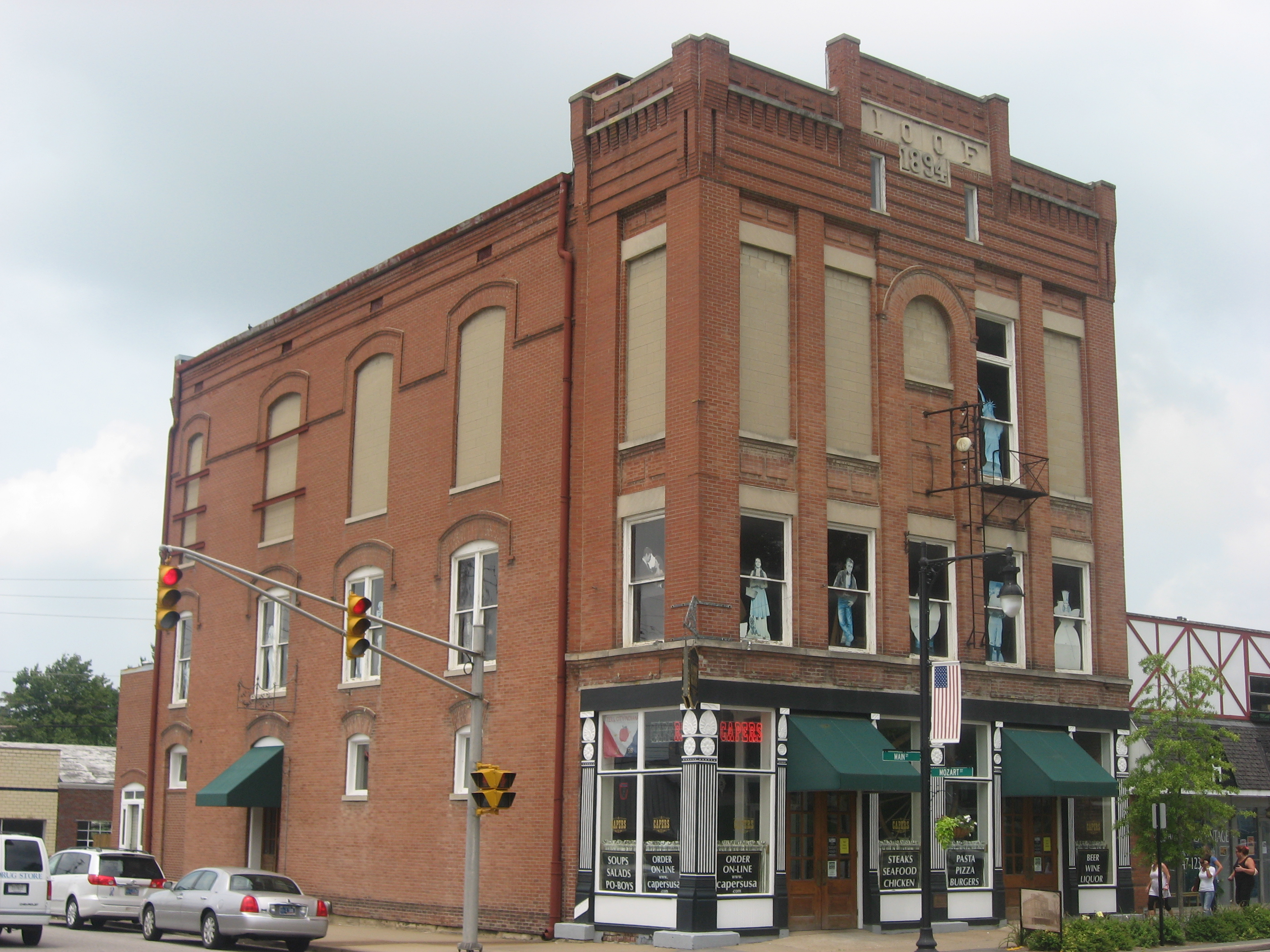
- Front and southern side of the building

- Location within Indiana Location within the United States
- Location: 701 Main St., Tell City, Indiana
- Coordinates: 37°57′3″N 86°46′12″W
- Area: less than one acre
- Built: 1894
- Architect: Schlotter, Frank
- Architectural style: Romanesque
- NRHP reference No.: 92001654

Significant dates
- Added to NRHP: November 27, 1992
- Removed from NRHP: March 22, 2014

The Tell City Oddfellows' Hall was a building in Tell City, Indiana, United States; also known as the "Hall of Tell City Lodge, No. 206, IOOF", it was constructed in 1894. It served historically as an Independent Order of Odd Fellows meeting hall, as a multiple dwelling, as a specialty store, and as a business. The building was destroyed by fire on the morning of October 14, 2013.

It was listed on the National Register of Historic Places in 1992 and was removed from the National Register in 2014.
