= Colville Opera House and Odd Fellows Hall =

- Opera House and IOOF Lodge
- U.S. National Register of Historic Places
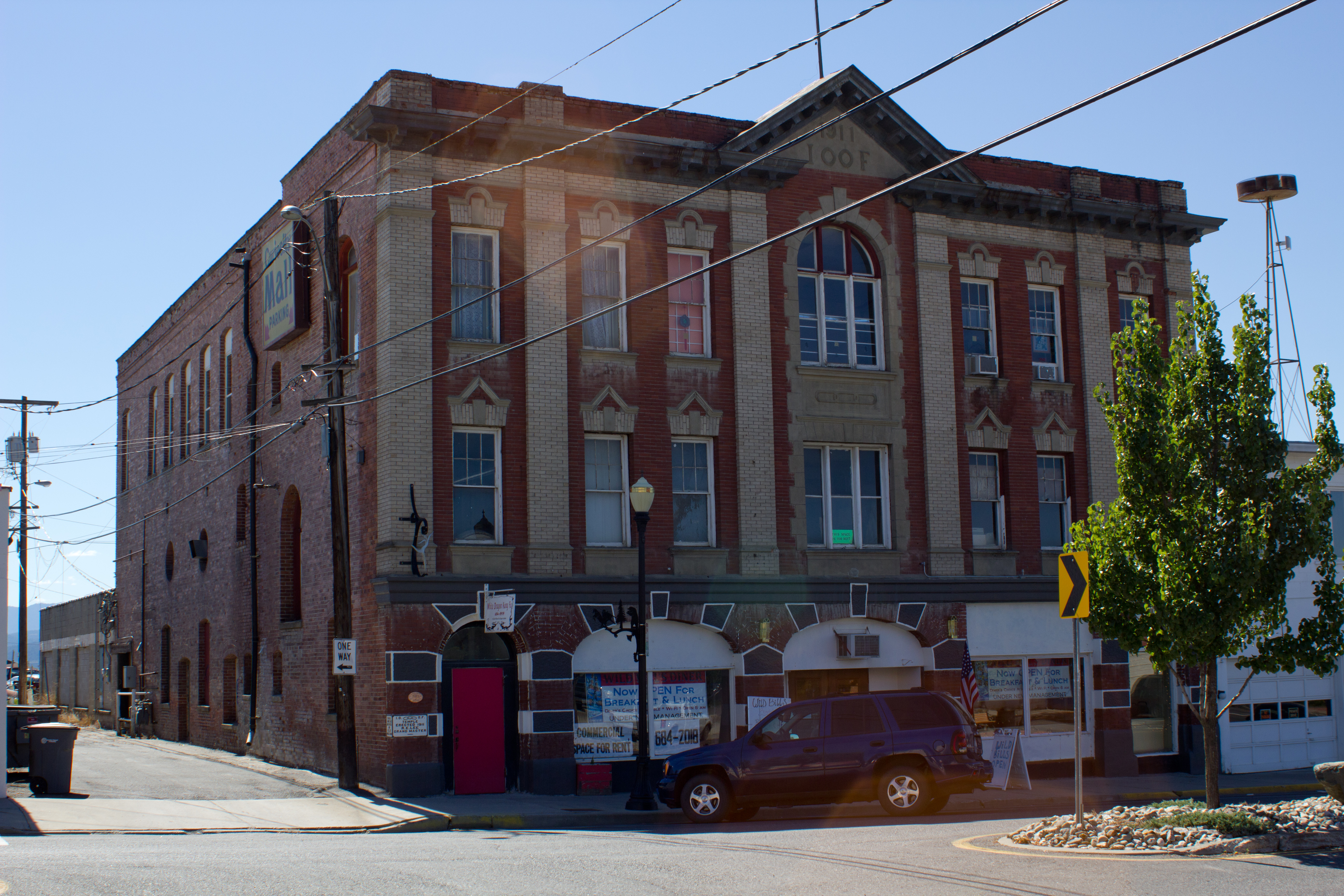

- Location within Washington (state)
- Location: 151 W. 1st Ave., Colville, Washington
- Coordinates: 48°32′39″N 117°54′24″W
- Area: less than one acre
- Architect: Yanish, Frank A.
- Architectural style: Classical Revival
- NRHP reference No.: 97000319
- Added to NRHP: April 18, 1997

The Opera House and IOOF Lodge in Colville, Washington, also known as Colville Opera House and Odd Fellows Hall, served historically as a meeting hall and theater. It shows Classical Revival architecture. It was listed on the National Register of Historic Places in 1997 as "Opera House and IOOF Lodge".

It has historic and architectural importance.
