= Lake Oswego Odd Fellows Hall =

- U.S. National Register of Historic Places
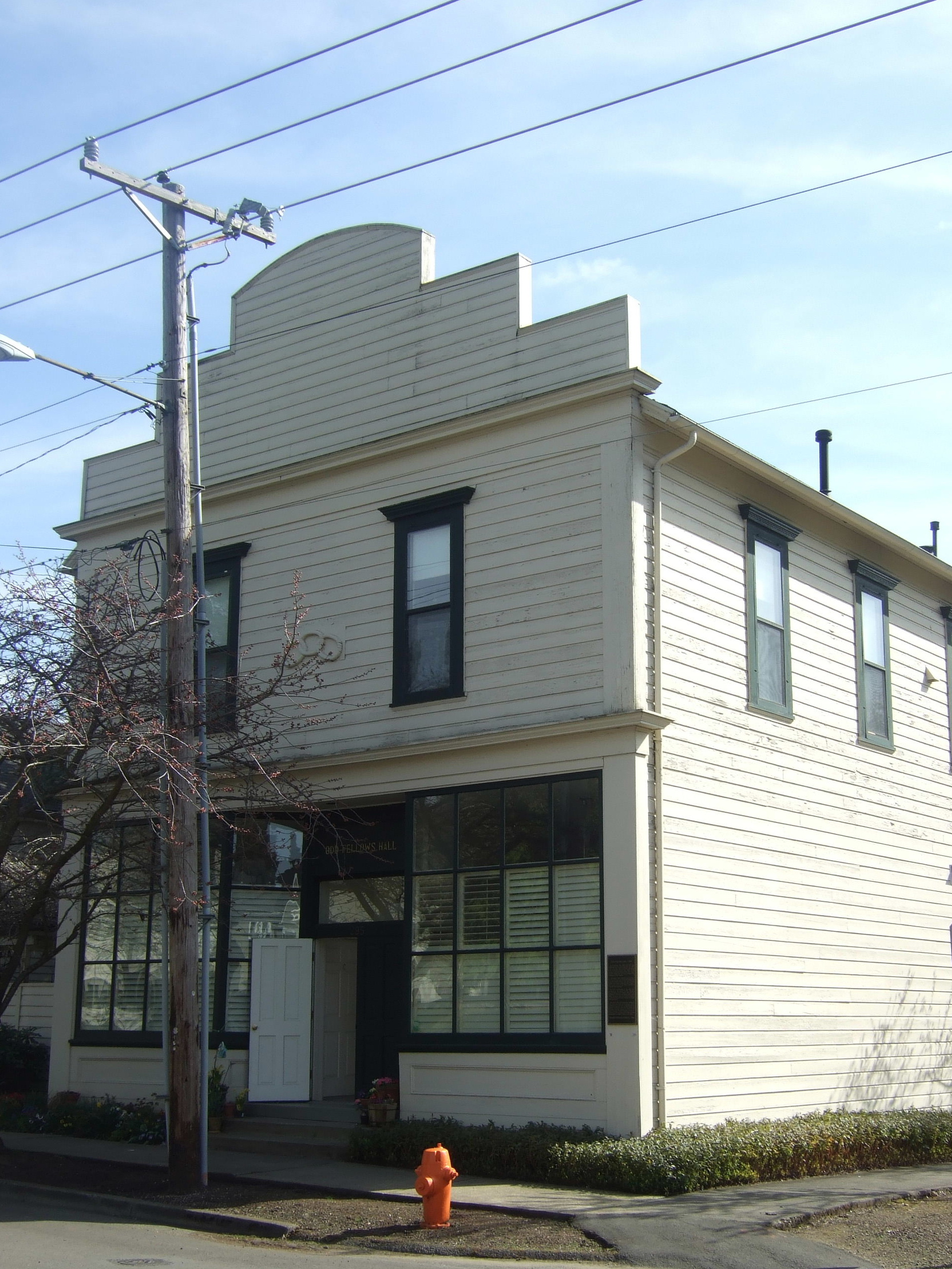

- Location within Oregon Location within the United States
- Location: Durham and Church Sts., Lake Oswego, Oregon
- Coordinates: 45°24′50″N 122°39′39″W
- Area: less than one acre
- Built: 1890
- Architect: Schmali & Birkemier
- NRHP reference No.: 79002042
- Added to NRHP: March 7, 1979

The Lake Oswego Odd Fellows Hall, in Lake Oswego, Oregon, was built in 1890. It was listed on the National Register of Historic Places in 1979. It served historically as a meeting hall of the local Independent Order of Odd Fellows chapter, which was formed in 1888. It also has served as a specialty store and in other uses.

The 31 feet (9.4 m) by 60 feet (18 m) building is one of the oldest in Lake Oswego.
