= IOOF Hall and Opera House =

- U.S. National Register of Historic Places
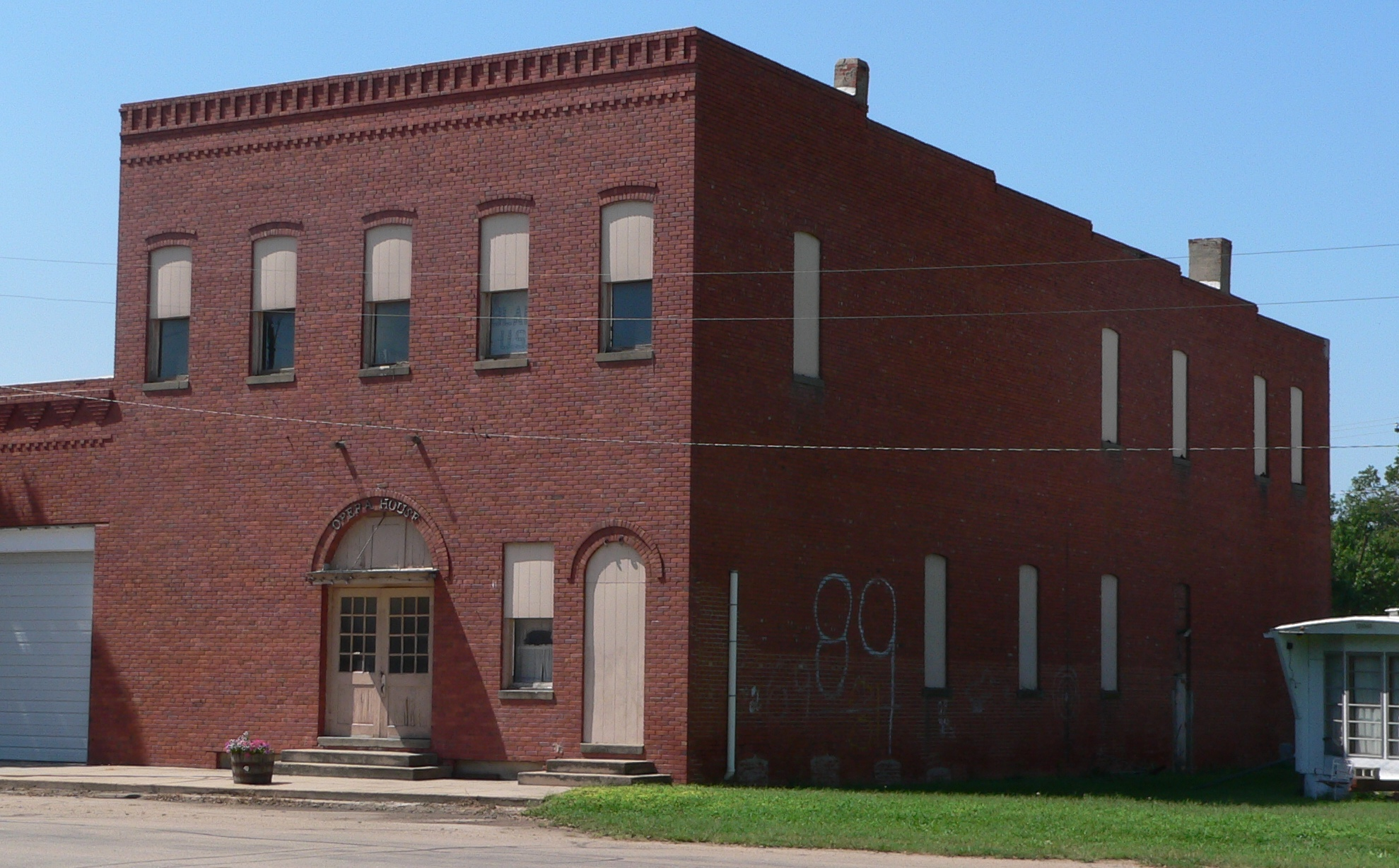
- View from the northeast.

- Location within Nebraska Location within the United States
- Location: Main St., Bladen, Nebraska
- Coordinates: 40°19′21″N 98°35′42″W
- Area: less than one acre
- Built: 1913
- Architectural style: One-part commercial block
- MPS: Opera House Buildings in Nebraska 1867-1917 MPS
- NRHP reference No.: 88000953
- Added to NRHP: July 6, 1988

The IOOF Hall and Opera House in Bladen, Nebraska, United States, was built in 1913. It served historically as a meeting hall, as a theater, and as a music facility. It was listed on the National Register of Historic Places in 1988.
