= I.O.O.F. Hall (Alva, Oklahoma) =

- U.S. National Register of Historic Places
- Location within Oklahoma Location within the United States
- Location: 527 Barnes St., Alva, Oklahoma
- Coordinates: 36°48′12″N 98°39′59″W
- Area: less than one acre
- Built: 1905
- Architectural style: Plains Commercial
- Demolished: May 22, 2004
- MPS: Territorial Buildings in Downtown Alva TR
- NRHP reference No.: 84000706
- Added to NRHP: January 5, 1984

The I.O.O.F. Hall in Alva, Oklahoma, USA, was built in 1905 in Plains Commercial architecture style. It was used historically as a department store and as a clubhouse for the Independent Order of Odd Fellows. It was listed on the National Register of Historic Places in 1984. On the morning of May 22, 2004, fire destroyed the building. Investigators ruled the blaze an accident.
