= IOOF Relief Home =

Historic house in Utah, United States

- U.S. National Register of Historic Places
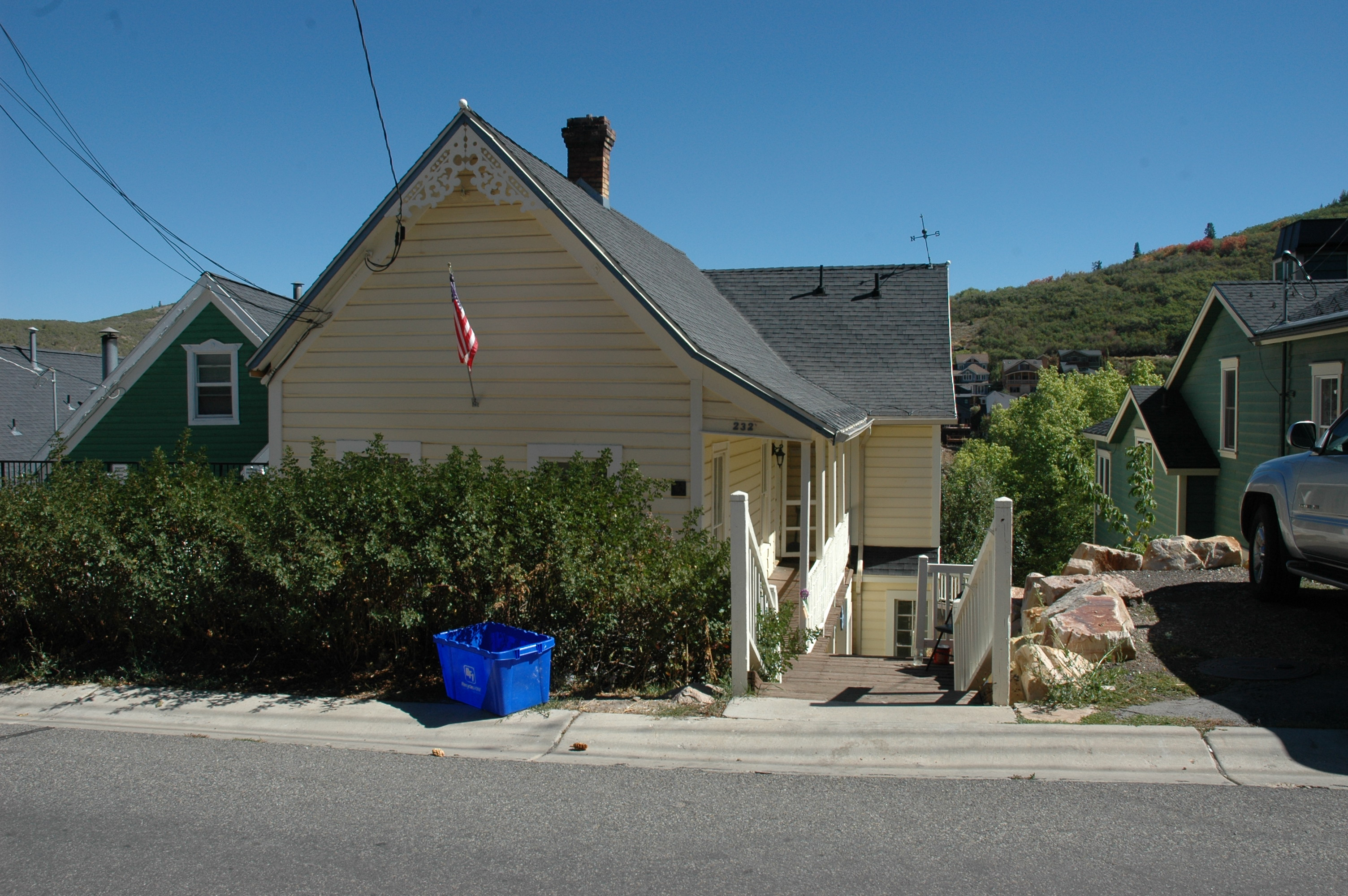
- View from Woodside Avenue in 2012

- Location within Utah Location within the United States
- Location: 232 Woodside Ave., Park City, Utah
- Coordinates: 40°38′27″N 111°29′41″W
- Area: less than one acre
- Built: 1890
- MPS: Mining Boom Era Houses TR
- NRHP reference No.: 84002311
- Added to NRHP: July 12, 1984

The IOOF Relief Home in Park City, Utah was built in 1890. It was listed on the National Register of Historic Places in 1984.
