= Elisha S. Converse =

American businessman

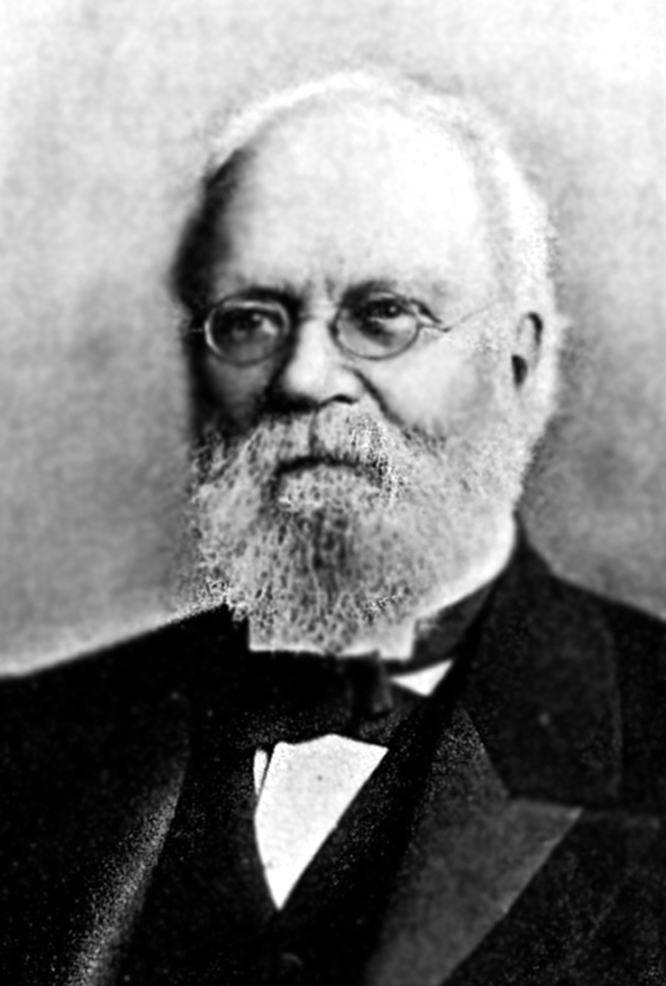
Elisha S. Converse

Elisha Slade Converse (July 28, 1820 – June 5, 1904) was the first mayor of Malden, Massachusetts, a businessman, founder and president of Boston Rubber Shoe Company, a representative and senator in the state legislature and a philanthropist.

== Family history ==
Elisha Slade Converse is a direct descendant of Deacon Edward Convers (Edward Convers) who migrated from Essex (England) to the New World colonies together with future governor John Winthrop in 1630.

The Convers families were yeoman farmers based in and around Navestock (Essex), with church records dating back to the early 1500s. But earlier history is harder to establish. Some sources claim that the family name Convers(e) derives from an aristocratic line of “Conyers”, stretching back as far as Roger de Coignieres, purportedly one of the chieftains of William the Conqueror. However, this lacks any documentary support and is probably just wishful thinking. Supposed links to early medieval nobility have been discounted by authoritative genealogical studies.

More recent studies using DNA analysis suggest that, in reality, the Essex Converses were descendants of medieval Jews who were required to convert to Christianity. The Y-DNA of living males with direct paternal lineage to Deacon Edward Converse shows that they share the J2 haplogroup, rare in the UK and Europe, but commonly found in Jews and other men of Middle Eastern origin. William the Conqueror originally welcomed Jewish settlement in England, but these families later suffered discrimination and were encouraged, or forced to convert to Christianity, many of them adopting the surname “Le Convers” (“The Convert” in Anglo-Norman French).

== Early years ==
Elisha Slade Converse, the third son of Elisha and Betsey (Wheaton) Converse, was born in Needham, Massachusetts, on July 28, 1820. When he was four years old, his parents moved to Woodstock, Connecticut. Spending his childhood there, he acquired professional and basic educational skills and, at thirteen years of age, began to work on a farm.

== Business achievements ==
From the age of sixteen, he learned the trade of a clothier. At nineteen, he began his own business in the village of Thompson and continued in it until he was 24 years old.

In 1844, he returned to Boston where he opened a wholesale shoe and leather company. The business was new to him but he soon familiarized himself with its details and during his connection with it, the reputation and success of the firm became well established.

In 1847, he moved to Stoneham, Massachusetts, and in 1850 to Malden, where he lived until his death on June 5, 1904. There, in 1851, he became one of the founders and directors of Malden Bank, which was reorganized as the First National Bank of Malden in 1864, and he served as its president for over 30 years, beginning in 1856.

Converse became the president, director, and trustee of other companies and institutions including the Boston Belting Company, Rubber Manufacturers' Mutual Insurance Company, Revere Rubber Company, Exchange National Bank of Boston, Five Cent Savings Bank and Wellesley College.

In 1853, Converse opened the Boston Rubber Shoe Company in Malden that employed 3,500 people and became one of the largest rubber manufacturers in the USA. In 1875 his factory was severely damaged by fire, but he managed to rebuild it within a few months. The business was so prosperous that it expanded to Melrose and later opened branches around the country and even in England. Converse was company treasurer and general manager for 40 years, and president from 1893.

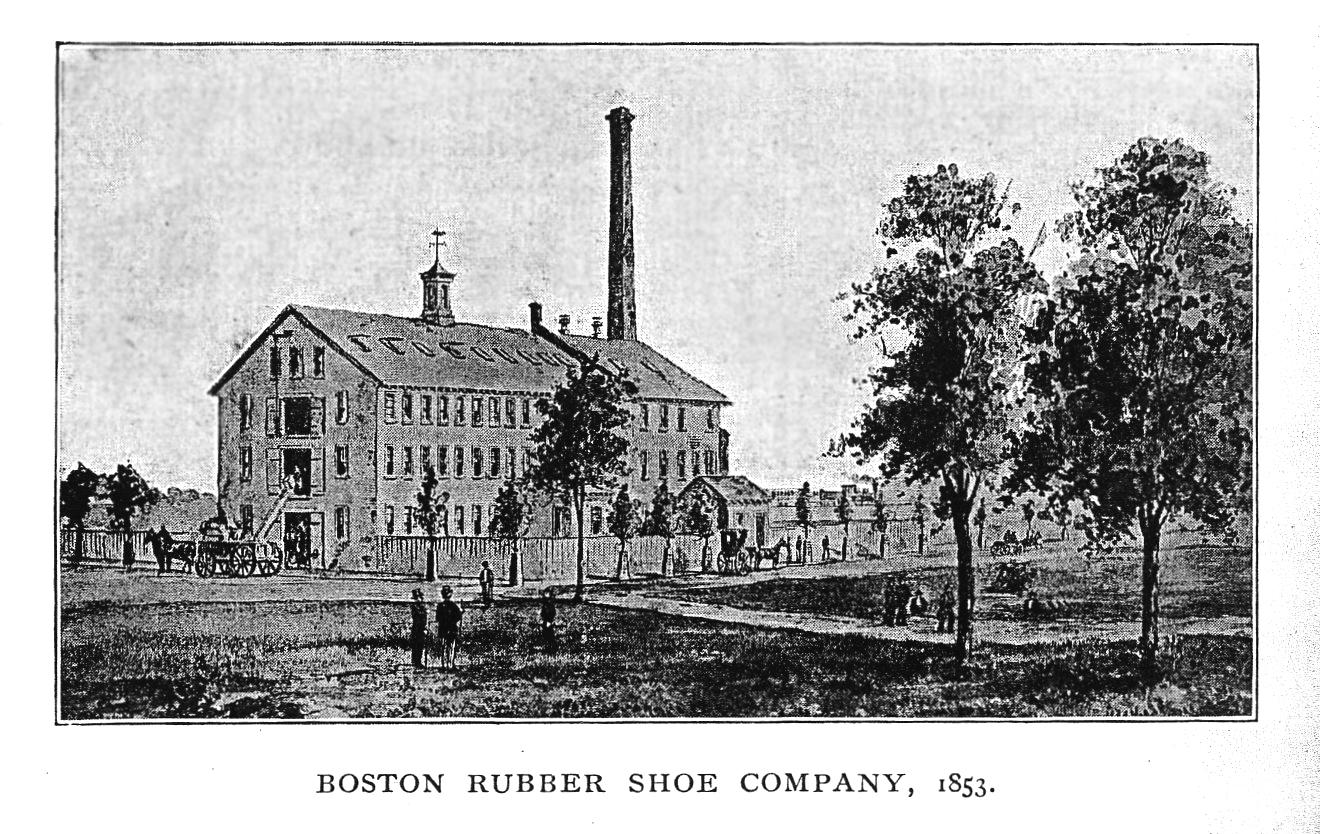
Boston Rubber Shoe Company, 1853

== Political/public service ==
He served the commonwealth for two years (1878–79) in the house of representatives and for two years (1880–81) in the state senate. In 1881, after Malden had been incorporated as a city, he was, by universal acclaim, elected as its first mayor.

== Philanthropy ==
Among Converse's philanthropic deeds were the establishment and construction of Malden Hospital, Malden City Hall, Malden Public Library, Malden YMCA, Malden Historical Society, and the Malden Auditorium - one of the finest theaters around Boston at that period.

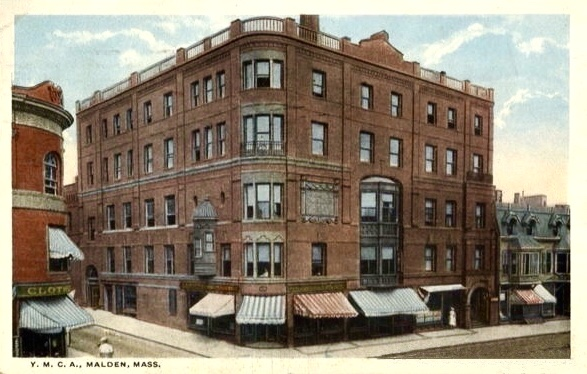
Malden YMCA, 1890s

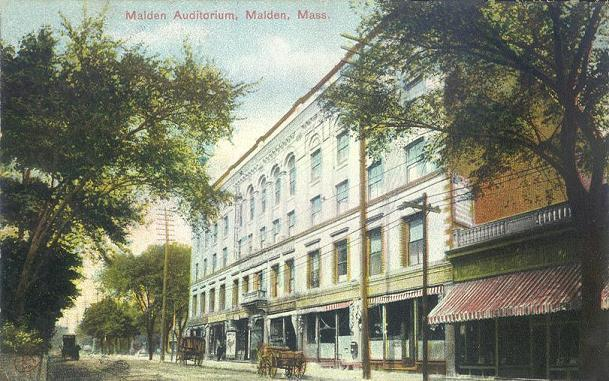
Malden Auditorium in 1909

The Converse Memorial Building, in which the Malden Public Library is located, was designed by Henry H. Richardson. It was built by Converse and his wife as a memorial of their eldest son, Frank, the assistant cashier of Malden Bank, who was murdered during the first US robbery of a bank in 1863. Converse donated money for its construction, and artwork for its decoration. This building, when completed, was given to the trustees of the Malden Public Library, "for the benefit of the inhabitants of the city of Malden." In October 1885, Malden Public Library was opened in the Converse Memorial Building.

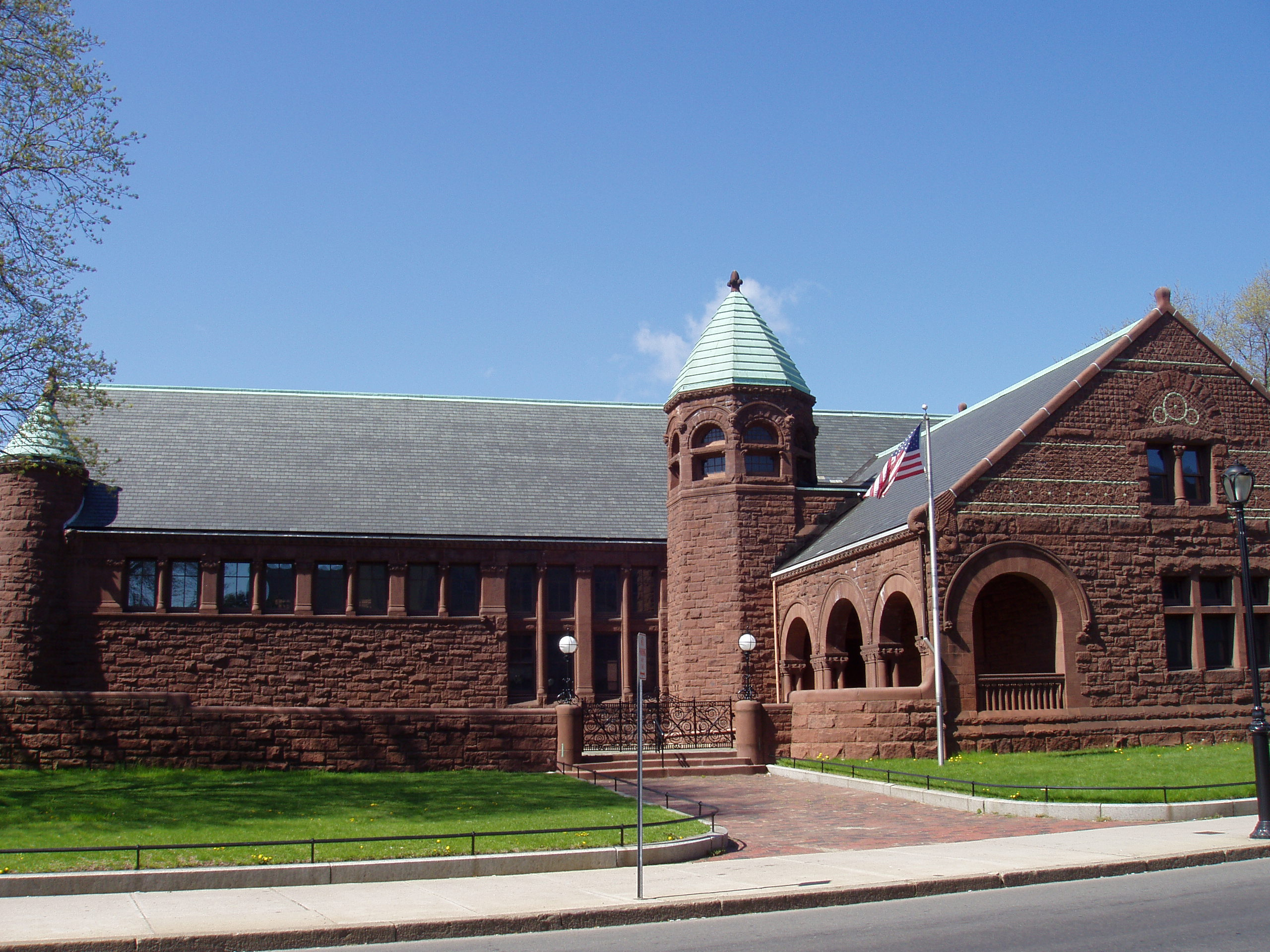
General view from street

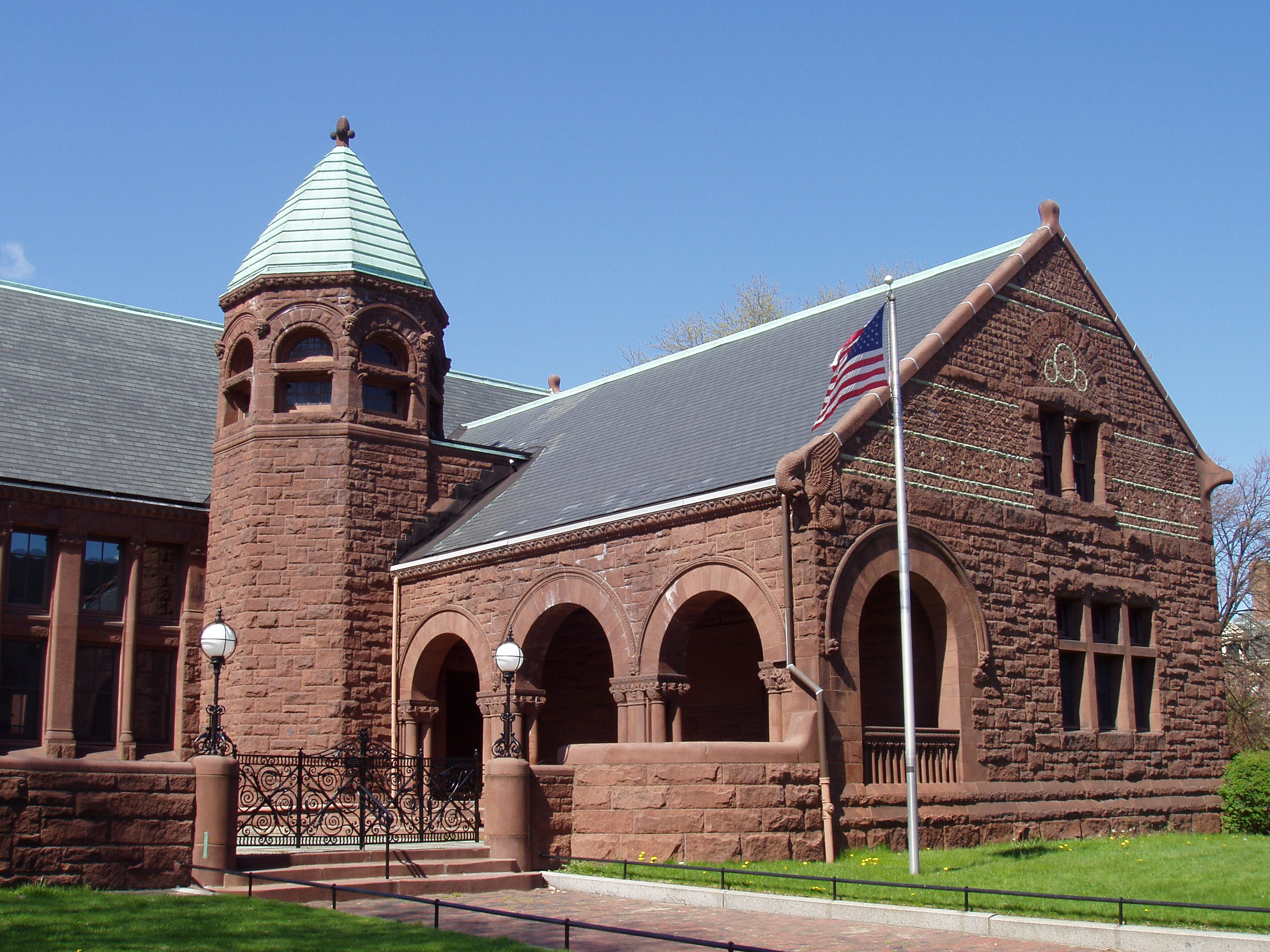
Angle view

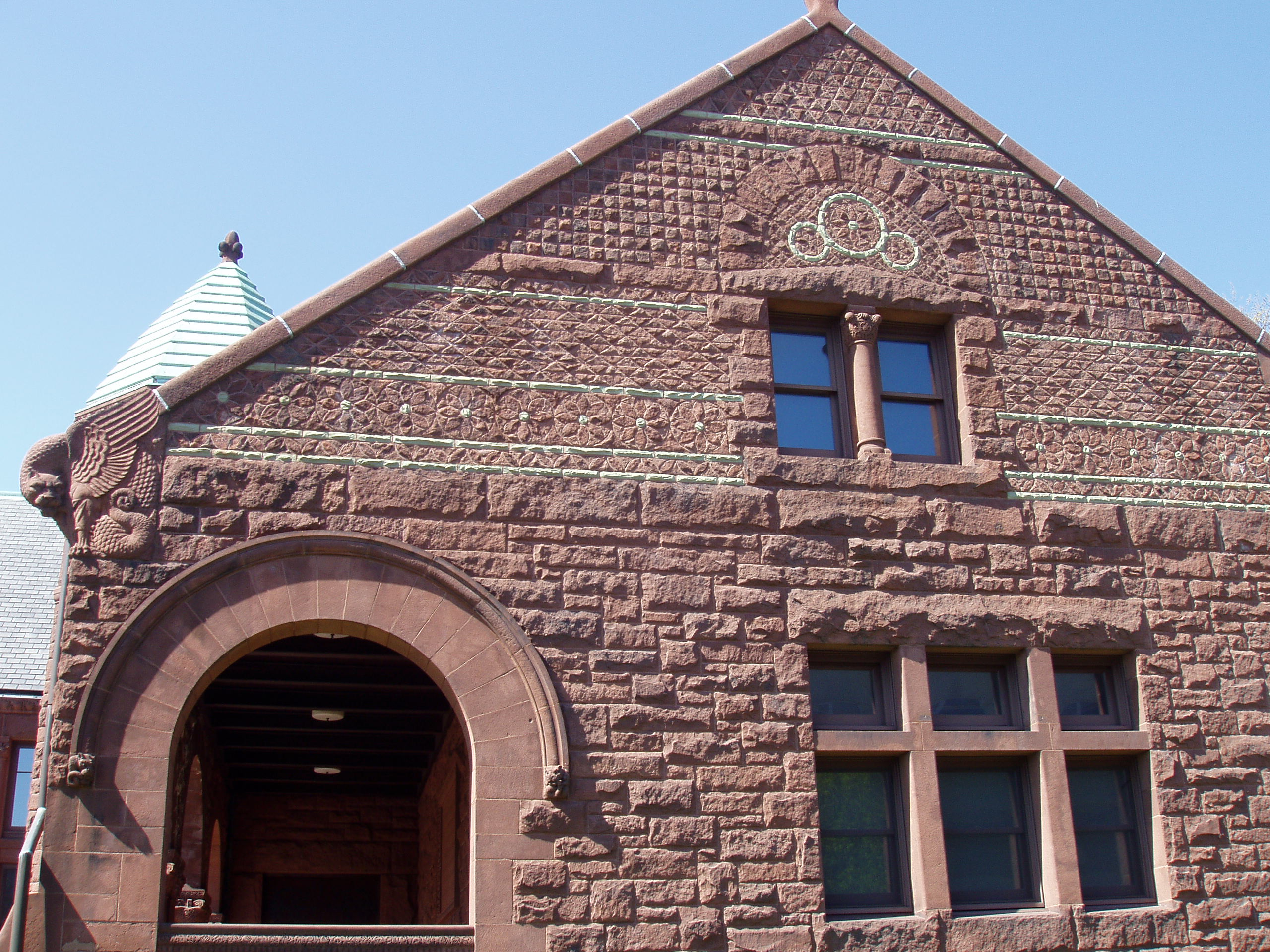
Facade decorations

Converse provided basic education and proper health care for his employees. He also founded the Malden Home for Aged Persons and Day Nursery.

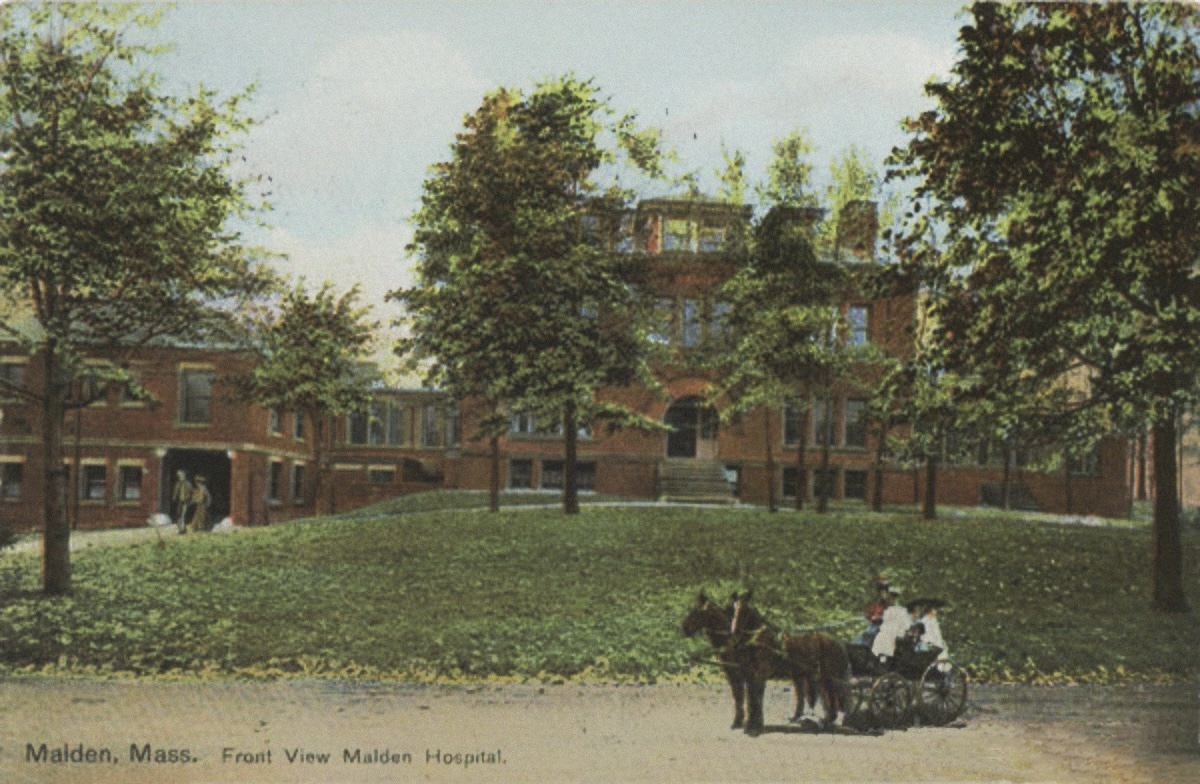
Malden Hospital, 1890s

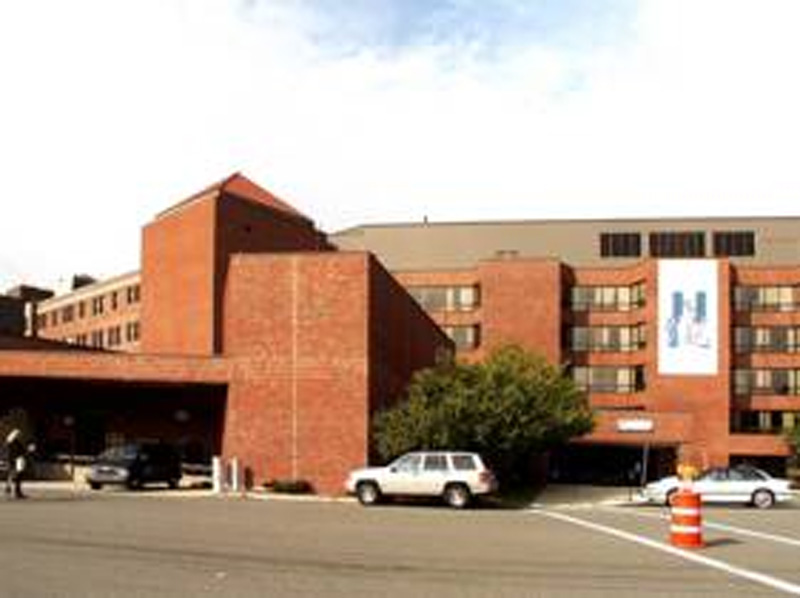
Malden Hospital, main entrance

Converse tried to improve the health care system in Malden. He provided monetary and land donations for the construction of Malden Hospital. In 1892, two years after its incorporation, Malden Hospital admitted its first patients. For many years Converse served as its president. He and his family donated money and land for the Maternity Hospital and the School of Nursing.

Converse participated in the creation of the Malden city water supply system (Spot Pond Water) and Reservoir.

Pine Banks Main Entrance

Converse donated 107.5 acres (43.5 ha) of land - to organize the public Pine Banks Park.

== Family ==
In 1843 Elisha S. Converse married Mary D. Edmands (1825–1903), daughter of Captain Hosea and Ursula Edmands, of Thompson.

Their children were: Frank Eugene Converse (1846–1863), Mary Ida Converse (1853–1940, m. in 1882 her cousin Costello Converse (son of Elisha' elder brother, James W. Converse)), Colonel Harry Elisha Converse (1863–1920, m. in 1891 Mary Caroline Parker, future captain of merchant ships; they had 3 sons and 2 daughters), Frances Eugenia Leland (1865–1941, m. in 1892 Lester Leland).

== See also ==
- 1878 Massachusetts legislature
- 1880 Massachusetts legislature
