= Odd Fellows Building (Malden, Massachusetts) =

- U.S. National Register of Historic Places
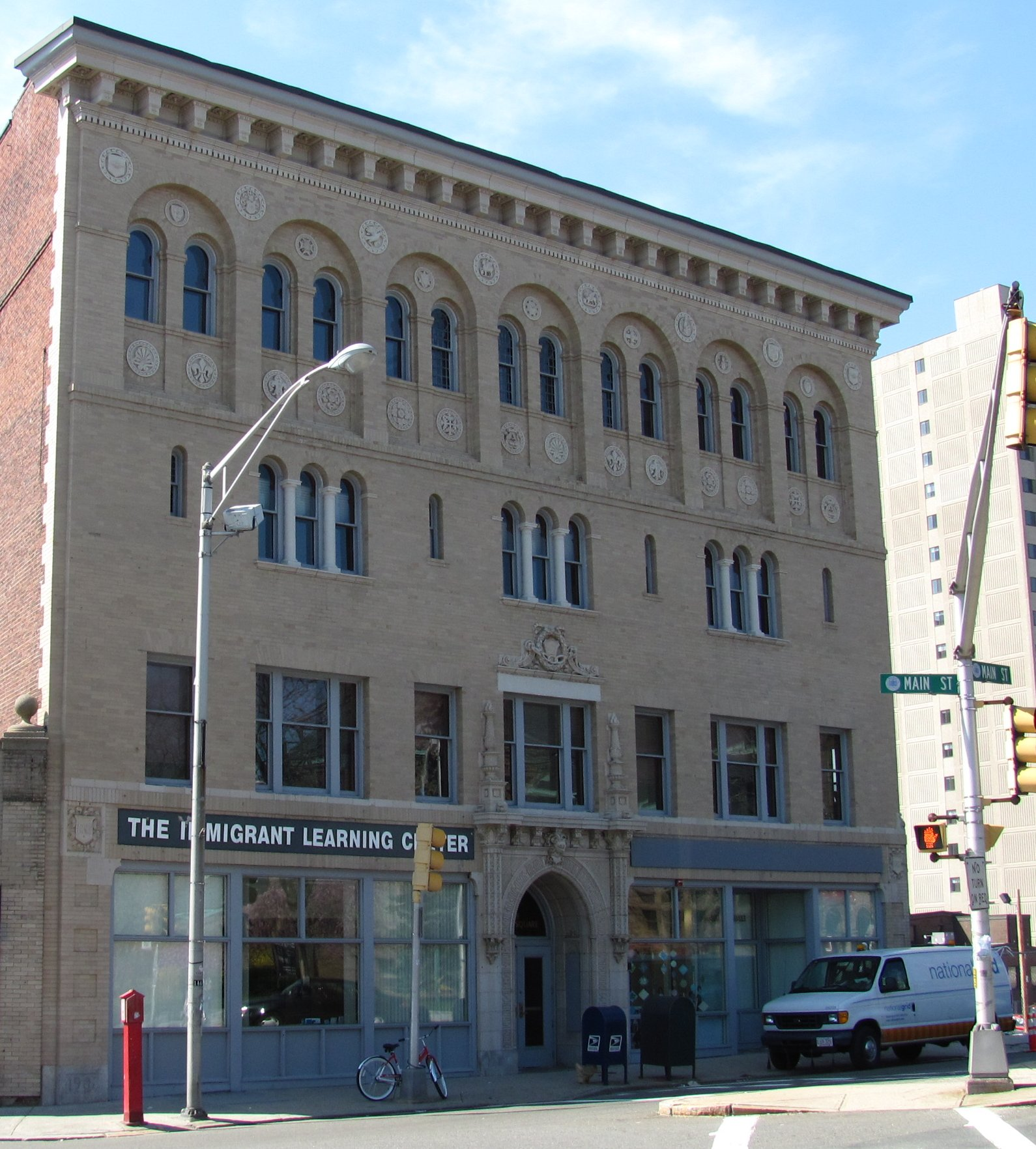
- Odd Fellows Building

- Location within Massachusetts Location within the United States
- Location: 442 Main Street, Malden, Massachusetts
- Coordinates: 42°25′45″N 71°4′2″W
- Built: 1907
- Architect: Newhall & Blevins
- Architectural style: Late 19th and 20th Century Revivals
- NRHP reference No.: 87002564
- Added to NRHP: December 22, 1988

The Odd Fellows Building is a historic commercial building in Malden, Massachusetts. The four story steel and masonry building was built in 1907 to a design by Louis C. Newhall for the local chapter of the International Order of Odd Fellows (IOOF). The building is faced in buff brick, and is predominantly Renaissance Revival in character. The first floor consists of storefronts, while the upper floors housed IOOF facilities, including a large meeting space. The upper levels are of particular architectural interest: the third level has groups of three arched windows separated by pillars, and the fourth has paired round-arch windows within recessed round-arch panels. The roof line is also ornate, with brackets and a dentil course.

Architect Newhall, a Malden resident, was senior partner in the Boston architecture firm of Newhall & Blevins. Among other projects, this firm was also responsible for the design of the Boston City Club.

The building was listed on the National Register of Historic Places in 1988.

== See also ==
- National Register of Historic Places listings in Middlesex County, Massachusetts
