= William Lloyd Garrison School =

- U.S. National Register of Historic Places
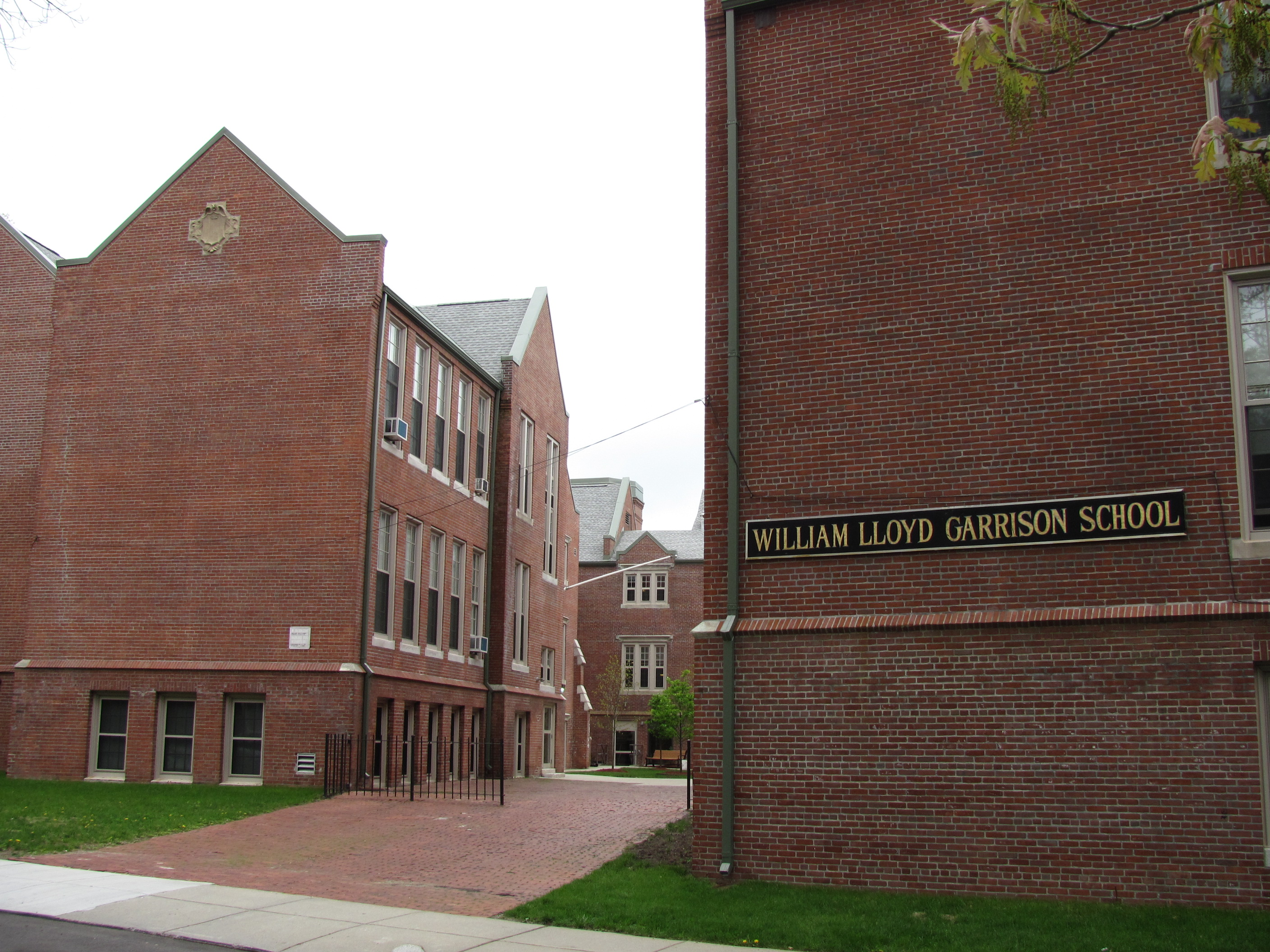
- William Lloyd Garrison School

- Location within Massachusetts Location within the United States
- Location: 20 Hutchings St., Roxbury, Boston, Massachusetts
- Coordinates: 42°18′34″N 71°5′22″W
- Area: 1.5 acres (0.61 ha)
- Built: 1910
- Architect: Newhall & Blevins
- NRHP reference No.: 80000674
- Added to NRHP: April 16, 1980

The William Lloyd Garrison School is a historic school building at 20 Hutchings Street in Boston, Massachusetts. Built in stages between 1910 and 1929 and named for abolitionist William Lloyd Garrison, it is a high-quality example of period school architecture, noted at the time for its state-of-the-art features. It was added to the National Register of Historic Places in 1980, and has since been converted into residences.

== Description and history ==
The former William Lloyd Garrison School is located in Boston's Roxbury neighborhood, north of Franklin Park between Hutchings and Brookledge Streets west of Elm Hill Avenue. It is a 2-1/2 story brick structure set on a raised basement, consisting of several different sections organized around a central courtyard and joined by passageways. Its elements are basically Colonial Revival in style, unified in part by the fact the three of its four building phases were designed by the same firm, Newhall & Blevins of Boston. The street-facing elements include basement-level windows on the original (eastern) block, and banks of classroom windows on the later western block.

The school was built, and then repeatedly enlarged, to meet the demands of Boston's rapidly growing population. Its first section was built in 1910, and was featured in a book on grade schools published in 1914. In 1918 that block was extended to the south, and in 1922 the assembly hall was added, set at an angle to the main block on the Brookledge Street side of the property. The final enlargement was in 1929, adding the western wing which forms the north side of the courtyard.

== See also ==
- National Register of Historic Places listings in southern Boston, Massachusetts
