= Mary Parker Converse =

American philanthropist and poet

Mary Caroline (Parker) Converse
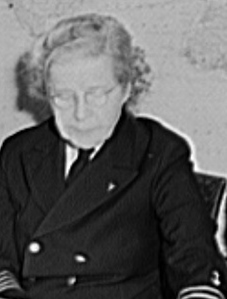
- Converse in 1941
- Born: Mary Caroline Parker; 1872; Malden, Massachusetts, United States
- Died: July 2, 1961 (aged 88–89); Oxnard, California, United States
- Notable work: First woman to be commissioned by the United States Merchant Marine

Mary Caroline (Parker) Converse (1872–1961), also known as Captain Mary Parker Converse, was the first woman to be commissioned by the United States Merchant Marine (USMM), and was also a noted philanthropist who wrote poetry and composed music.

== Formative years ==
Born in Malden, Massachusetts in 1872, Mary Caroline Parker was a daughter of Anne Elizabeth (Gilmore) Parker and John H. Parker, a respected deacon of Malden's First Baptist Church and successful shoe manufacturer who was a lineal descendant of an American Revolutionary War Patriot and victims of the Salem witch trials. Her father was also a close friend of Malden's hometown's first mayor, the millionaire Elisha S. Converse.

Reared and educated in Malden, she progressed as far as high school before deciding to drop out in order to marry at the First Baptist Church on December 2, 1891, before 1,700 guests from Malden, Boston and beyond. Her new husband, Harry Elisha Converse (1863–1920), who was an “ardent yachtsman” and owner of the Eugenie, was a son of her father's close friends, Mary E. Converse and The Honorable Elisha Converse. Like his father, who was president of the Boston Rubber Shoe Company (later known as U.S. Rubber), Harry Converse worked for that same company, and was also active civically, having already been elected to the Malden town council by the time of his marriage to Mary Parker.

After two honeymoons – the first in December 1891 to Detroit and Chicago, which involved tours of their family's Midwestern shoe factories, and the second, an 1892 spring cruise aboard a German ocean liner – they settled into married life in their mansion in Malden. Together, the couple then welcomed the arrival of five children: son Elisha Edmands (1894–1985), who was born on July 6, 1894; daughter Margaret (1896–1981), who was known as "Peggy"; son Roger Wolcott (1900–1970), who was known as "Govie"; daughter Mary (1902–1940); and son Parker (1897-1965), who was known as "Rip."

In 1896, her husband purchased the 900-ton yacht, Penelope. The following year, he was promoted to the position of vice president with the Boston Rubber Shoe Company. By 1898, her husband was involved in an undertaking of an entirely different stripe. Motivated to sell his beloved yacht Penelope to the U.S. Navy as his nation entered the Spanish–American War, he was then appointed as a colonel and acting quartermaster-general of the Massachusetts Volunteer Militia by Governor Roger Wolcott in 1901.

== Civic engagement and philanthropy ==
During their marriage, both Mary Converse and her husband became increasingly active in civic and philanthropic activities. In addition to becoming a trustee for the Soldiers’ Home in Chelsea and the Malden Hospital, Harry Converse served on the Board of Fire Commissioners, and as a member of Malden's Masonic Lodge (Converse). Socially, they were affiliated with the Algonquin Club, Boston Art Club, Brookline Country Club, Calumet Club, Eastern Yacht Club (Marblehead Neck), Kenwood and Malden clubs, and the New York Yacht Club.

Although the couple was later separated by their divergent interests, she and her children were well provided for via trust funds which had been established by Harry Converse.

By 1911, Mary Converse had relocated to Boston, where she continued to be active civically and socially. Among her other initiatives, she helped to established a fund which enabled the Boston Opera to provide reduced price tickets for lower income youths.

It was also during this era that she became a playwright and music composer. Following her application to a class at Radcliffe College, she solicited feedback in 1917 from Harvard faculty member George Pierce Baker regarding one of her works, and later wrote music for Stuart Walker's "Six Who Pass While the Lentils Boil."

== World War I ==
In response to America's entry into World War I, Mary Converse embarked on yet another civic project. After joining the Boston chapter of the American Red Cross, she penned an inspirational pamphlet for members of the U.S. military, and helped to assemble soldiers' grooming kits. She then also actively worked to improve conditions for prisoners of war.” and joined the U.S. Navy’s ambulance corps. She “taught herself to read and speak Russian” in conjunction with this latter service, following interactions with a Russian-speaking soldier.

== Widowhood and return to the sea ==
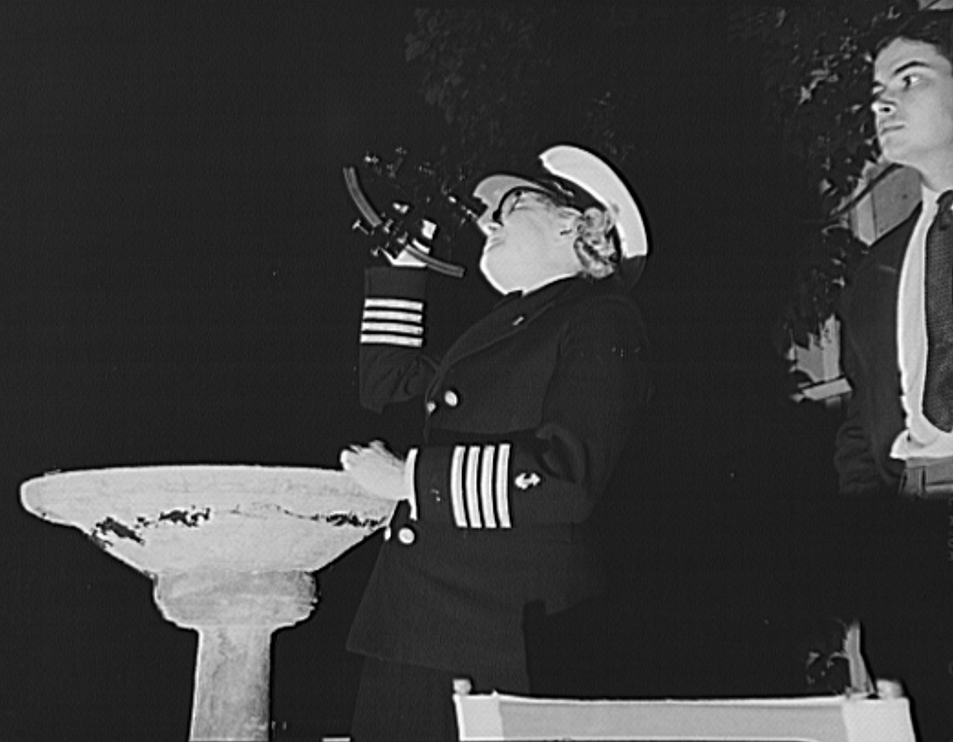
Capt. Mary Parker Converse, the first woman ever commissioned by the U.S. Merchant Marine, demonstrates the night use of a sextant in 1941 for U.S. Navy ensign commission candidates (public domain, U.S. Library of Congress).

Widowed by her husband on December 8, 1920, Mary Converse relocated to Denver, Colorado in 1923, and spent the next 20 years helping to improve the quality of life for her fellow Denver residents by supporting a range of civic, arts and other community organizations, including the Denver Symphony Orchestra.

Sometime after this move, Mary Converse attended the United States Merchant Marine Academy at Kings Point, New York, where she earned a second-class pilot's license, according to historian Andrew Zimmerman.

In 1938, she petitioned leaders of the United States Merchant Marine to have her license renewed, and set about completing USMM requirements in order to so. During this time she began a "life-long fascination with navigation."

As part of the obligations associated with re-licensing, she was required to regain her sea legs. So, on February 2, 1938, she joined the crew of the South African freighter S.S. Henry S. Grove, and honed her navigation skills as a 4th mate and practicing pilot while en route from Trinidad to Cape Town. She then continued her training at the same rank aboard the freighter S.S. Lewis Luckenbach. Departing in June 1939, she sailed from Brooklyn, New York to San Francisco, California by way of the Panama Canal, becoming increasingly adept at celestial navigation. Driving from San Francisco to Seattle, Washington, she boarded the S.S. Dell Wood on July 15, and engaged in further training en route to Alaska.

In addition to logging 33,700 miles during four voyages over a three-year period, she had also enrolled at the Washington Technical Institute in Seattle. Earning a "'master of steam and motor vessels of any gross tonnage on any ocean – yachts only,'" she made history, becoming "the only woman to earn captain’s papers (for yachts of any tonnage and in any ocean) in the U.S. Merchant Marine." The Brooklyn Daily Eagle reported on her accomplishment as follows:

"CAPTAIN" CONVERSE Mrs. Mary P. Converse, Denver's sea-going society matron, proudly holds the certificate making her a captain to prove that woman's place is on the bridge as well as the galley. She returned from her latest voyage privileged to call herself "Captain Mary P. Converse" by virtue of a certificate witnessing the fact that she may "navigate steam and motor vessels of any gross tonnage on the waters of any ocean. She passed the examinations given by the United States steamboat service, U. S. Department of Commerce, with a rating of 99, after six weeks' study. The white-haired, 67-year-old grandmother reached Seattle by sea sailing as fourth mate on a freighter from New York by way of the Panama Canal. Never Seasick in three years of Intermittent sailings, she has made [voyages] from New York to Seattle, from the African coast on the east to Alaska on the north. In the 100,000 miles she "guessed" she has traveled on the seas, Mrs. Converse said she had never been seasick. Her Interest in navigation dates back to the time when, with her husband, the late Harry E. Converse, she sailed his yachts. After his death she moved to Denver, established a home and assumed leadership in social and musical affairs. In the back of her mind, however, were thoughts of the sea.

Composes Too

For a time she will remain in Denver, doing her best to interest youths of the Rocky Mountain region in the importance of the merchant marine and urging them to accept the challenge of the sea. "This is a definite opportunity to serve the country," she said, "in this hour of unrest and future uncertainty." When she is home, Captain Converse shifts interests. From navigation she turns to musical composition, and recently completed a sextet for strings which doubtless will be played at one of her swank "evenings at home."

She then preserved her cherished status as a first-class pilot by renewing her license every five years.

== World War II ==
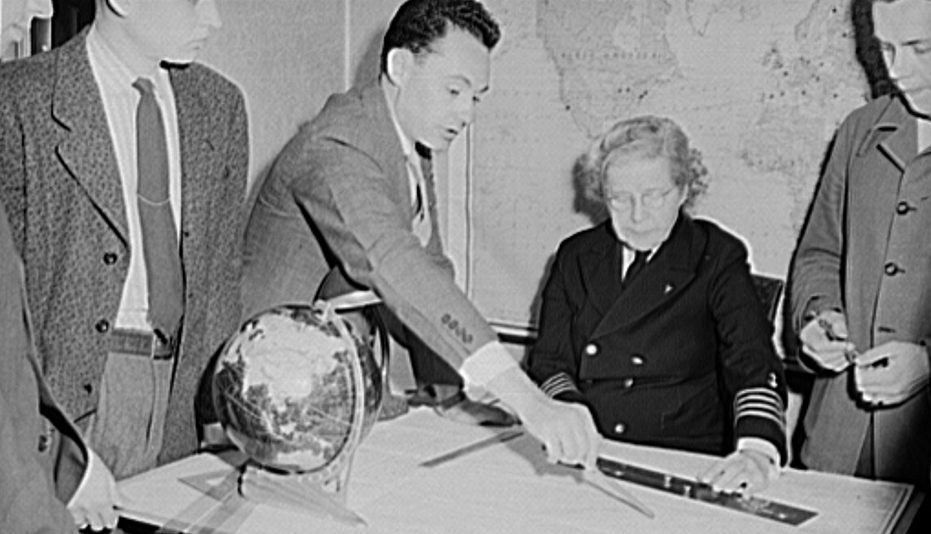
Capt. Mary Parker Converse shows U.S. Navy ensign commission candidates how to use a compass, gyroscope and sextant in 1941 (public domain, U.S. Library of Congress).

Despite this accomplishment, Captain Mary Converse never sailed again; instead, she became an educator who taught navigation to officers in the U.S. Navy Reserve during World War II. Post-war, she then became involved with the High Altitude Observatory in Denver. Intensely interested in astronomy and solar research, she was respected as one of the organization's most articulate and effective advocates, recruiting members of the Coors family and other patrons who provided significant amounts of funding for operations and research. She also helped to plan the HAO annual scientific lectures known as "Captain Mary Dinners."

In 1957, she relocated to the Camarillo, California ranch of her son Elisha, but still remained active as a fundraiser and advocate for the observatory.

== Death and burial ==
Mary Caroline (Parker) Converse died at the age of 89 at the Oxnard Hospital in Oxnard, California on Sunday, July 2, 1961.

Some have reported that her remains were returned to Massachusetts for burial at the same cemetery where her husband had been laid to rest – the Woodlawn Cemetery in Everett, Middlesex County. However, that cemetery only has records of her husband's burial there.

Her obituary, which was syndicated in newspapers nationwide eulogized her as follows:

Capt. Mary Parker Converse, the only woman to hold a sea captain's papers in the United States merchant marine, is dead at the age of 89. Capt. Converse died Saturday at a hospital in Oxnard. A sailor most of her life, Capt. Converse had lived on the family ranch at Camarillo, Calif., for the past four years. She spent four months in 1940 charting the South Pacific, the Indian Ocean, the Panama Canal and Alaskan waters to win her captain's rating. She was the widow of wealthy yachtsman Col. Harry Converse.

When word was received of her death, board and staff of the High Altitude Observatory issued the following statement:

Among the many thoughtful services the Board wishes to take note of are: (1) the donation to the High Altitude Observatory building which made possible the Captain Mary P. Converse Seminar Room; (2) her generosity in setting up the Captain Mary P. Converse Student Emergency Fund, by which many students have been helped through temporarily rough seas; (3) her annual dinner and lecture parties at the Denver Country Club… ; and (4) her years of valuable advice as a Research Associate of the High Altitude Observatory…. The memorials she has left – especially the Seminar Room and the Student Emergency Fund—are much like Captain Mary herself, possessing an inspiring usefulness far beyond first impressions."

== Publications ==
- Converse, Mary Parker. 113 Days on Iron Decks: A Voyage of Re-discovery. Denver, Colorado: Self-published, 1938.
- Converse, Mary Parker. Again We Sail. Denver, Colorado: Self-published, 1940.

== Awards and other honors ==
From 1957 to 1960, Capt. Mary Converse held the position of research associate with the High Altitude Observatory, an honorary post awarded to her by the organization's board of trustees in recognition of her longtime, effective support.

In 1961, a seminar/conference room was dedicated in her honor at HAO's Denver facility. When HAO operations were relocated to Boulder, Colorado, a seminar/conference room was then also dedicated in her honor there – in the HAO's new south tower.

== External resources ==
- Converse, Mary Allen. Captain Mary: The Biography of Mary Parker Converse, Captain, U.S.M.M. Kings Point, New York: American Merchant Marine Museum, January 1987.
- United States Merchant Marine Academy and American Merchant Marine Museum. Kings Point, New York.
