= Newhall & Blevins =

Architecture firm in Massachusetts, USA

Practice information
- Partners: Louis C. Newhall; Albert H. Blevins; John W. Reth
- Founders: Louis C. Newhall; Albert H. Blevins
- Founded: 1903
- Dissolved: 1933
- Location: Boston, Massachusetts

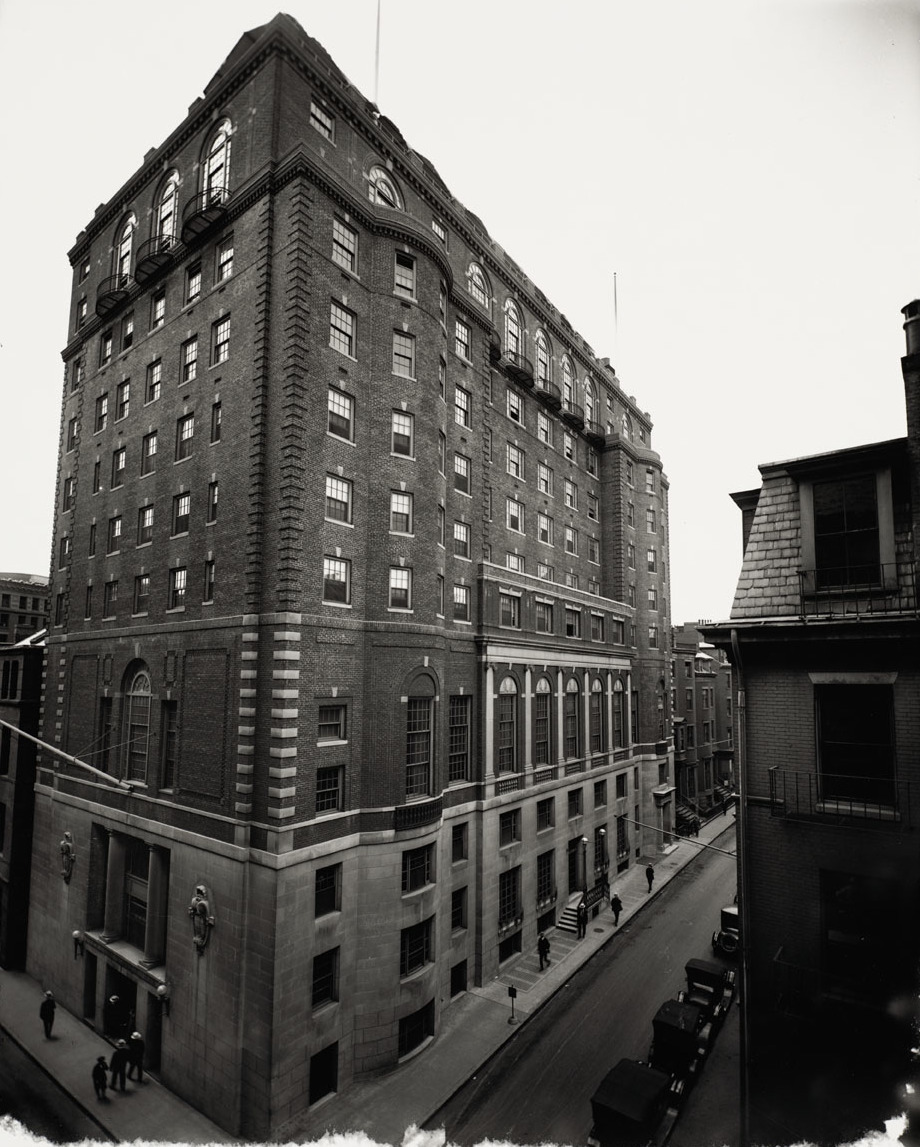
Boston City Club, Boston, Massachusetts, 1913.

Newhall & Blevins was an American architecture firm based in Boston, Massachusetts, active from 1903 to 1933. It was the partnership of architects Louis C. Newhall (1869–1925) and Albert H. Blevins (1874–1946). Newhall established a practice alone in 1901, forming his partnership with Blevins in 1903. They were partners until 1919, and remained associated until the death of Newhall in 1925. After Newhall's death, the firm was reorganized as Newhall & Blevins Inc. with John W. Reth (1888–1940) as president and treasurer. Reth was an engineer and construction supervisor who had been with Newhall & Blevins for several years. The firm was dissolved in 1933, apparently due to financial troubles.

== Biographies of founders ==
=== Louis C. Newhall ===
Louis Chapell Newhall was born April 17, 1869, in Malden, Massachusetts. He graduated from Malden High School and attended Tufts College before entering the Massachusetts Institute of Technology. After his graduation he worked for Boston architects J. Merrill Brown, J. Williams Beal and Arthur H. Bowditch, before being awarded the Rotch Travelling Scholarship in 1898. In 1901, after three years abroad, he returned to Boston and established an architecture practice. He formed his partnership with Blevins in 1903 and remained associated with him as Newhall & Blevins until his death.

Newhall was elected president of the Boston Architectural Club in 1905 and remained in that office until 1915. From then until his death, he served as treasurer. He died December 26, 1925, in Boston.

Newhall was also a member of the Society of Arts and Crafts of Boston.

In 1914, based on a trip through France, Newhall authored The Minor Chateaux and Manor Houses of France of the XV and XVI Century.

=== Albert H. Blevins ===
Albert Henry Blevins was born May 26, 1874, in Cambridge, Massachusetts, to John Joseph and Eleanor Blevins. He attended Cambridge English High School, and Harvard College from 1894 to 1898. After working as an engineer for the Massachusetts state highway system until 1901, he returned to Harvard for graduate study in architecture. After working for several Boston architects, he joined Newhall in partnership in 1903. This partnership was dissolved in 1919, though he remained loosely associated with Newhall so as to manage his and Newhall's real estate interests, which were extensive. After the death of Newhall, Blevins was no longer associated with the firm.

He married Beatrice Magee of Cambridge in 1914. He died October 23, 1946.

== Legacy ==
Louis C. Newhall and Albert H. Blevins had a general practice, designing all types of buildings. Their projects were chiefly confined to the Boston area, though they also worked in Maine, New Hampshire and Vermont. They were best known for their large apartment buildings, which received particular attention in the architectural press of the time. Many of their buildings were based on the model of Richmond Court in Brookline, which was designed by Ralph Adams Cram in 1898. Of these, the Boston architectural historian Douglass Shand-Tucci believed that their Burton Hall (1909) was the best of the many buildings in the Boston area based on Richmond Court. This was echoed by Maureen Meister in her study of New England's Arts and Crafts architecture, finding it one of the best examples of English Tudor architecture in the region. They were also responsible for a number of English-inspired churches in Belmont, Cambridge, Lynn, Malden and Worcester, Massachusetts.

Newhall & Blevins contributed to the design of at least three buildings that have been individually listed on the United States National Register of Historic Places, and others contribute to listed historic districts.

== Architectural works ==
- Black Rock House, Cohasset, Massachusetts (1904, demolished 1968)
- Faulkner Methodist Church (former), Malden, Massachusetts (1907)
- Odd Fellows Building, Malden, Massachusetts (1907–1908, NRHP-listed 1988)
- "Questenmere" for Frederick McQuesten, Marblehead, Massachusetts (1908–1909, demolished)
- Wadsworth Chambers, Cambridge, Massachusetts (1908)
- Burton Hall, Cambridge, Massachusetts (1909)
- Faith Lutheran Church, (Note: Heavily damaged by fire in 2023.) Cambridge, Massachusetts (1909)
- Paris Street Gymnasium, East Boston, Boston, Massachusetts (1909–1910)
- Second Congregational Church, (Note: Designed in association with Nelson & van Wagenen of New York.) Lynn, Massachusetts (1909–1910)
- William Lloyd Garrison School, Roxbury, Boston, Massachusetts (1910, 1918 and 1922, NRHP-listed 1980)
- Remington Gables, Cambridge, Massachusetts (1910)
- Y. M. C. A. Building, Marblehead, Massachusetts (1910–1911, demolished 2011)
- Y. W. C. A. Building, Cambridge, Massachusetts (1910)
- Third Congregational Church (former), Cambridge, Massachusetts (1911, demolished 1974, tower extant)
- "The Chalet" for F. Holland Day, Little Good Harbor, Georgetown, Maine (1912)
- Inman Square Fire Station, Cambridge, Massachusetts (1912)
- Tavern Inn, Laconia, New Hampshire (1912)
- Boston City Club, Boston, Massachusetts (1913)
- Lambda Iota Fraternity House, Burlington, Vermont (1913)
- Payson Park Congregational Church, Belmont, Massachusetts (1915)
- Addition to the Converse Memorial Library, Malden, Massachusetts (1916, NRHP-listed 1985)
- Dickinson House, Mount Holyoke College, South Hadley, Massachusetts (1916)
- Mather Court, Cambridge, Massachusetts (1916)
- Cambridge Savings Bank Building, Cambridge, Massachusetts (1923)
- Overseers of the Public Welfare Building and Temporary Home for Women, Boston, Massachusetts (1924)
- Concordia Lutheran Church, Worcester, Massachusetts (1925)
- Phineas Bates School, Roslindale, Boston, Massachusetts (1929)

== Gallery of architectural works ==
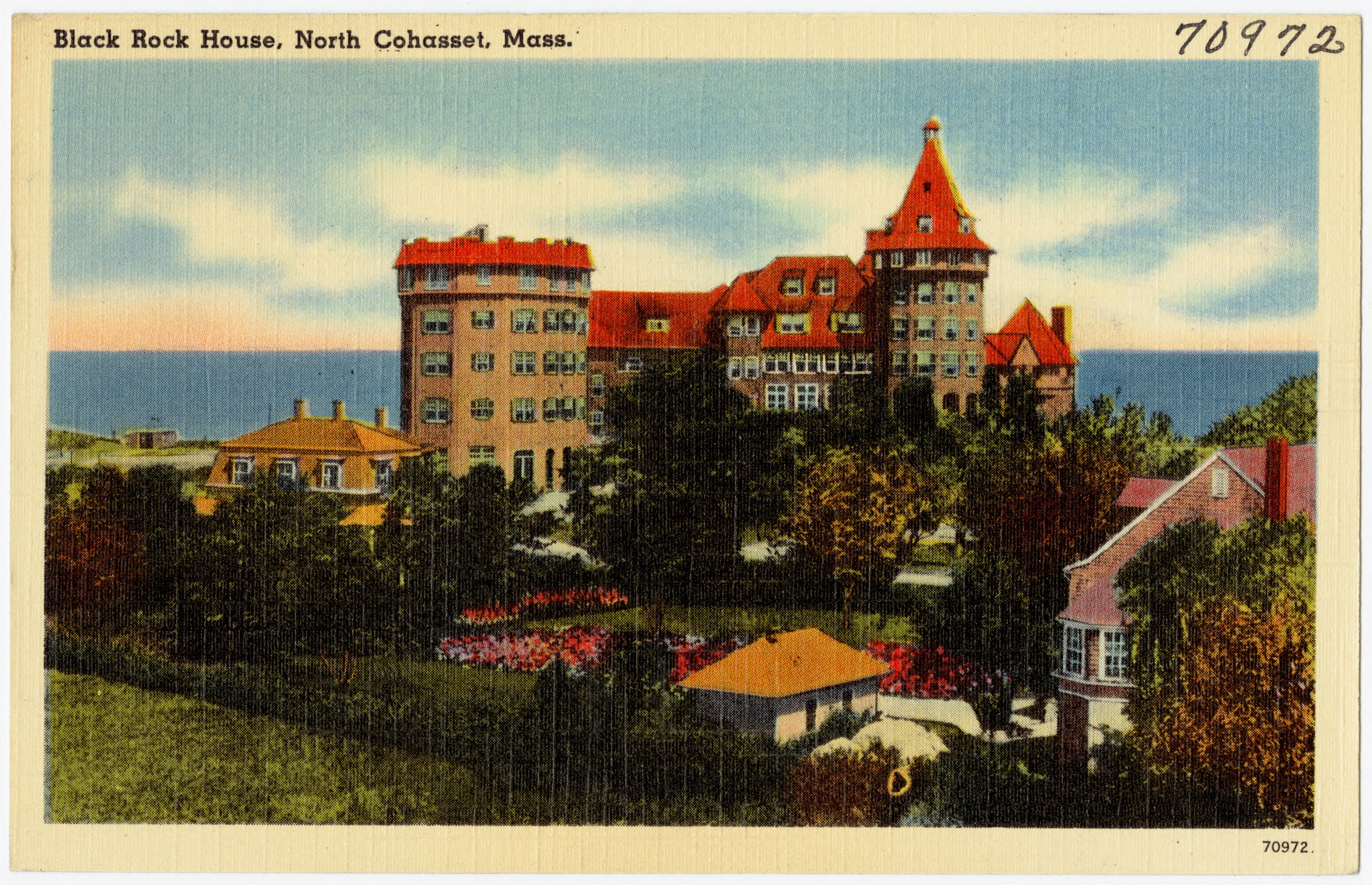
Black Rock House, Cohasset, Massachusetts, 1904.

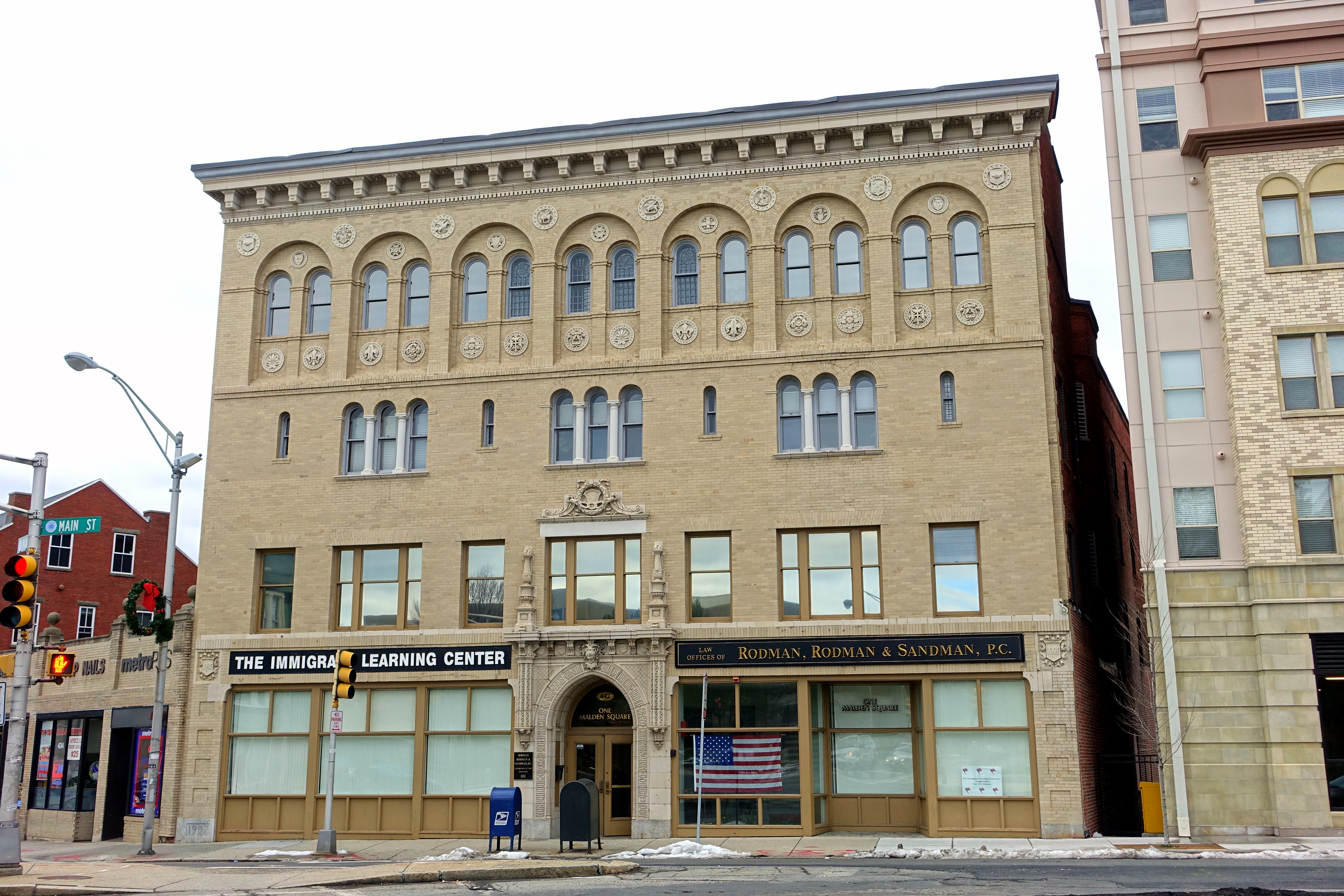
Odd Fellows Building, Malden, Massachusetts, 1907-08.

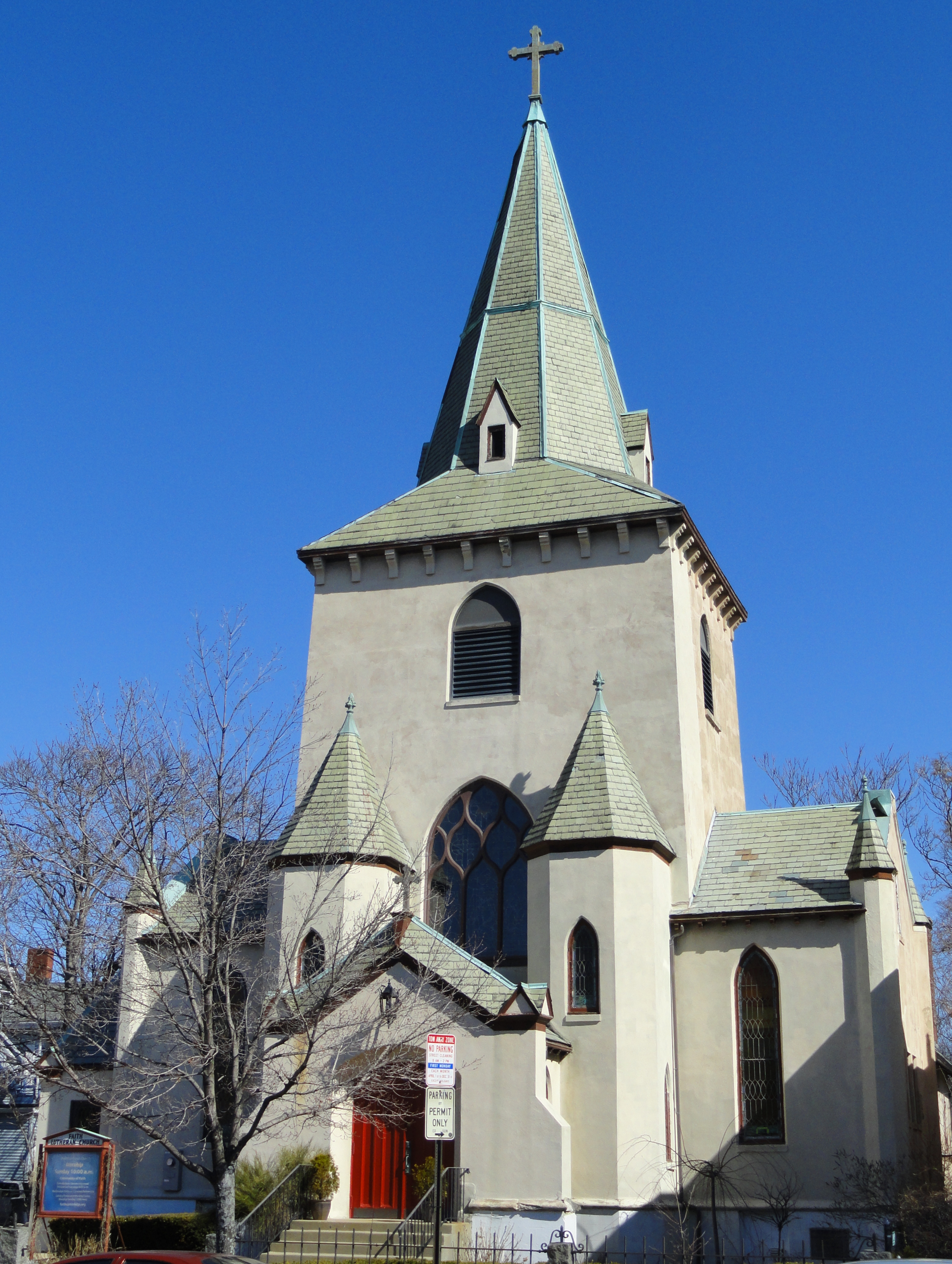
Faith Lutheran Church, Cambridge, Massachusetts, 1909.

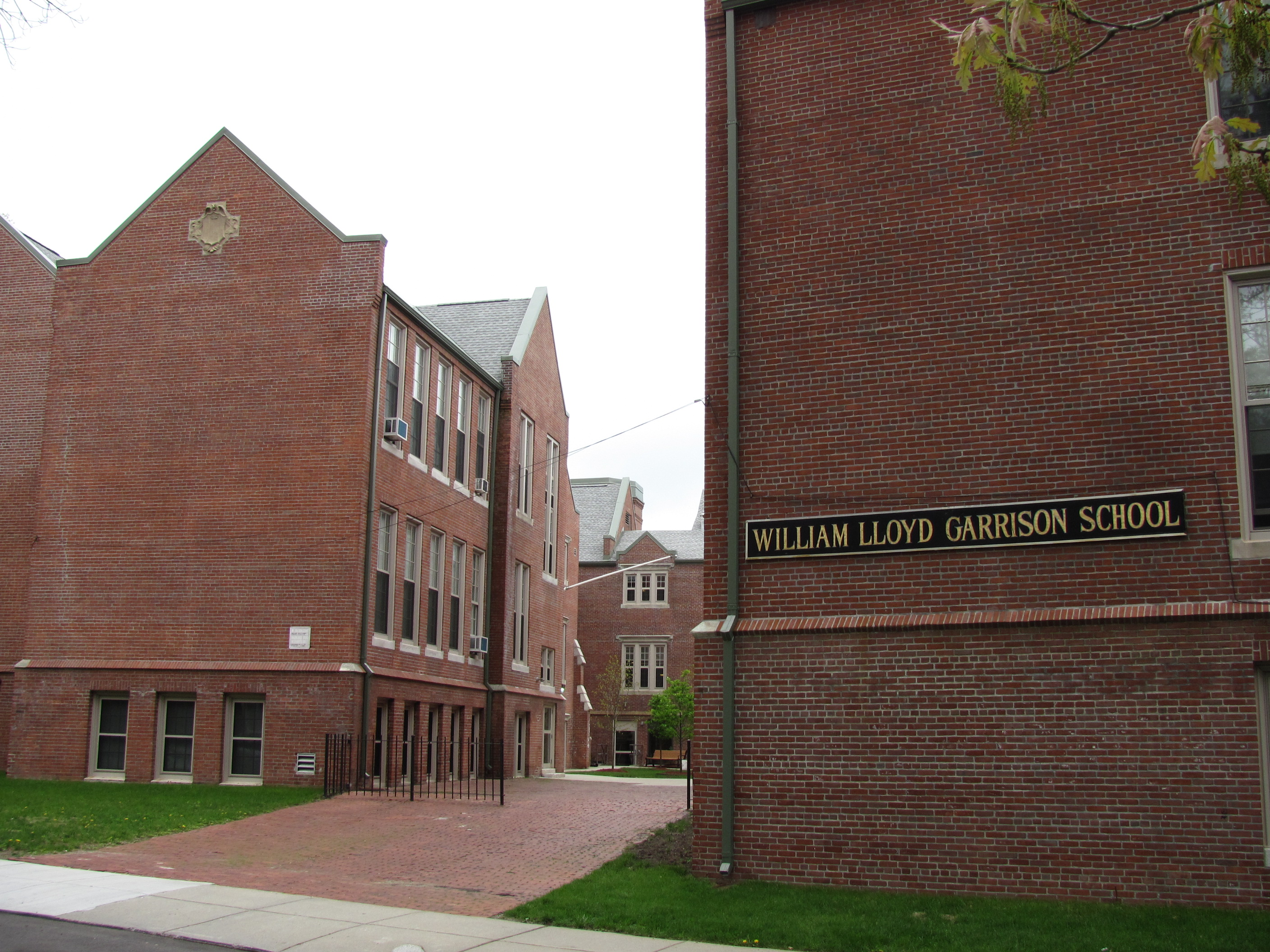
William Lloyd Garrison School, Roxbury, Boston, Massachusetts, 1910, 1918 and 1922.

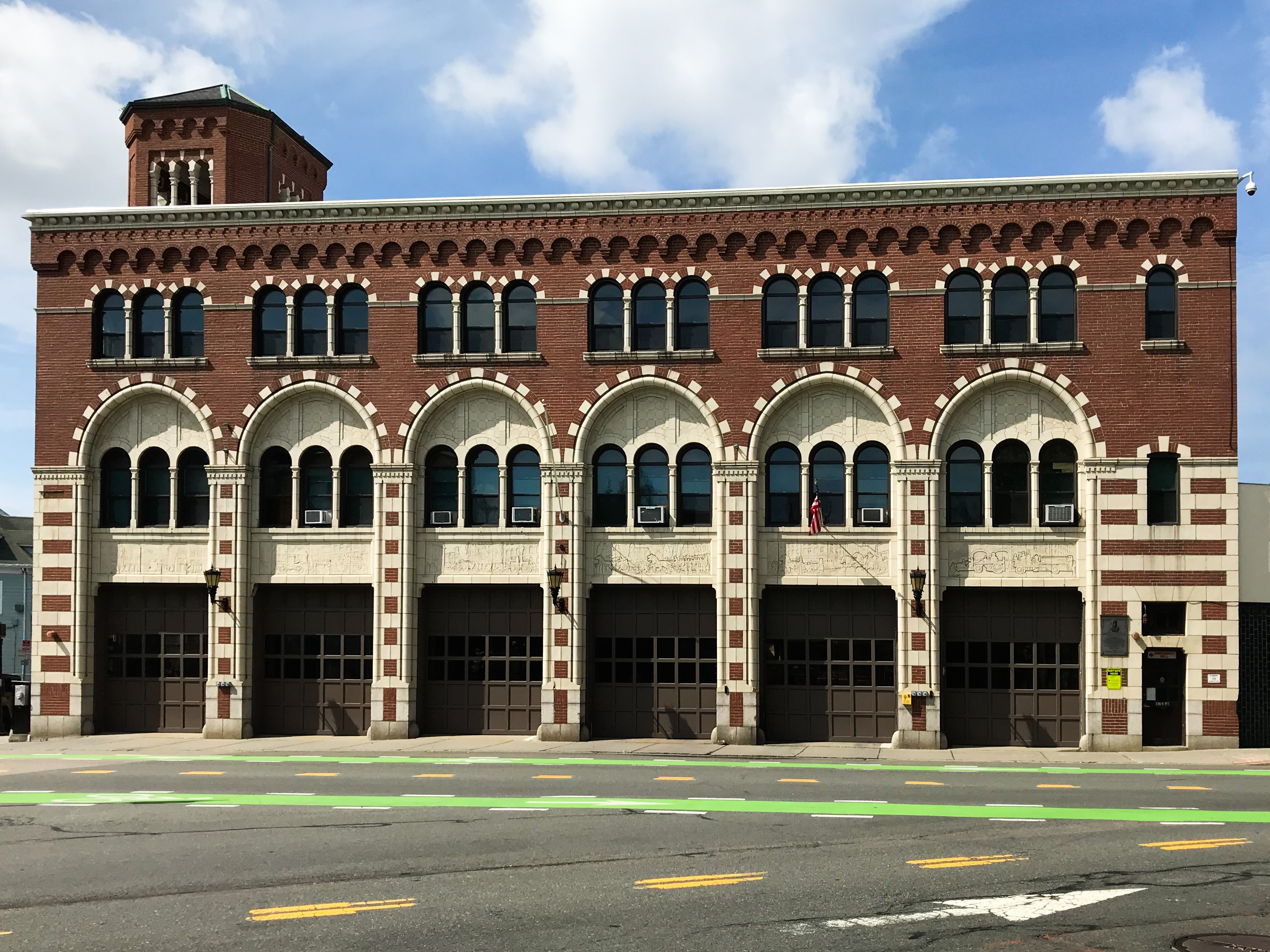
Inman Square Fire Station, Cambridge, Massachusetts, 1912.

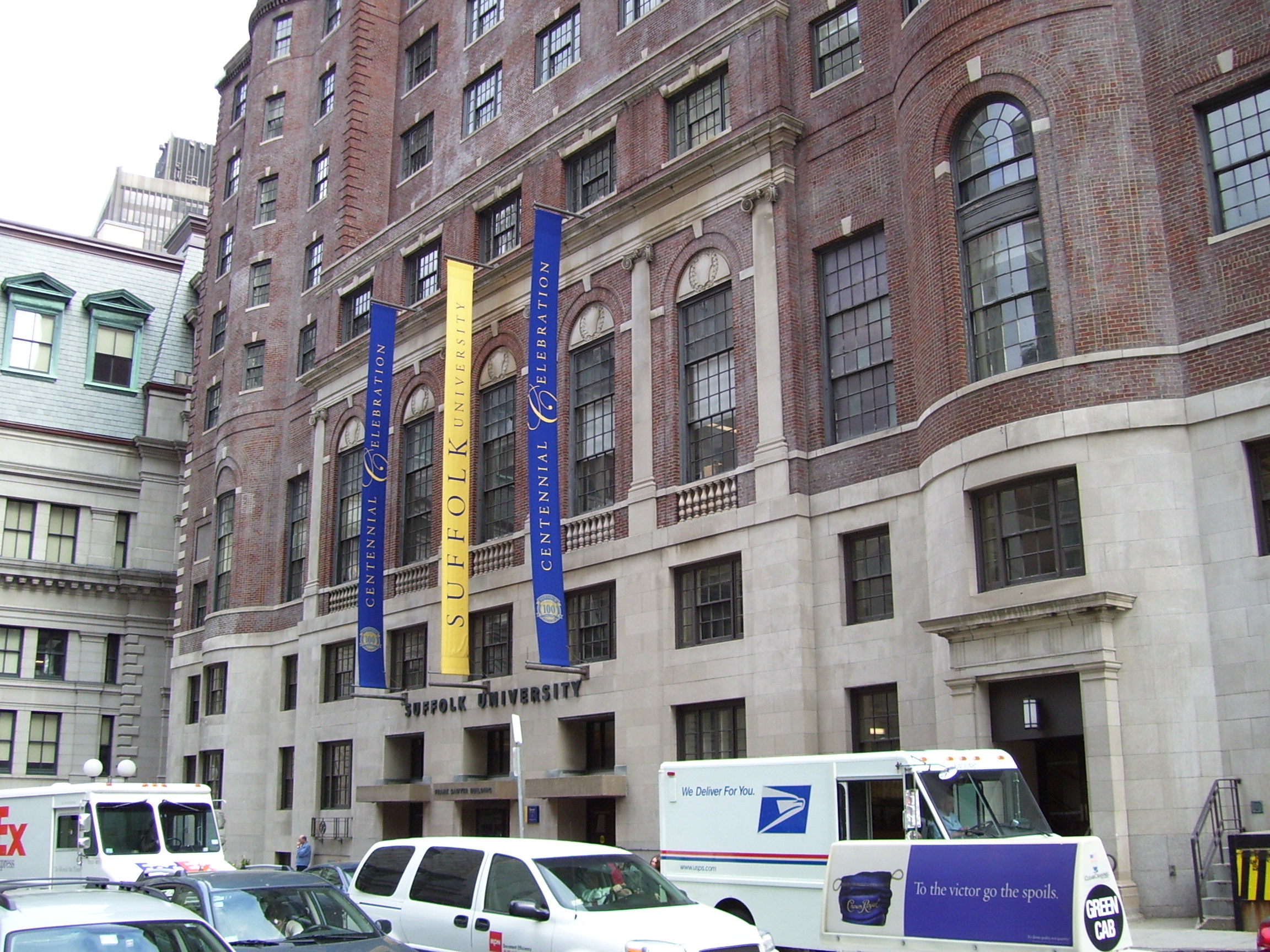
Boston City Club, Boston, Massachusetts, 1913.

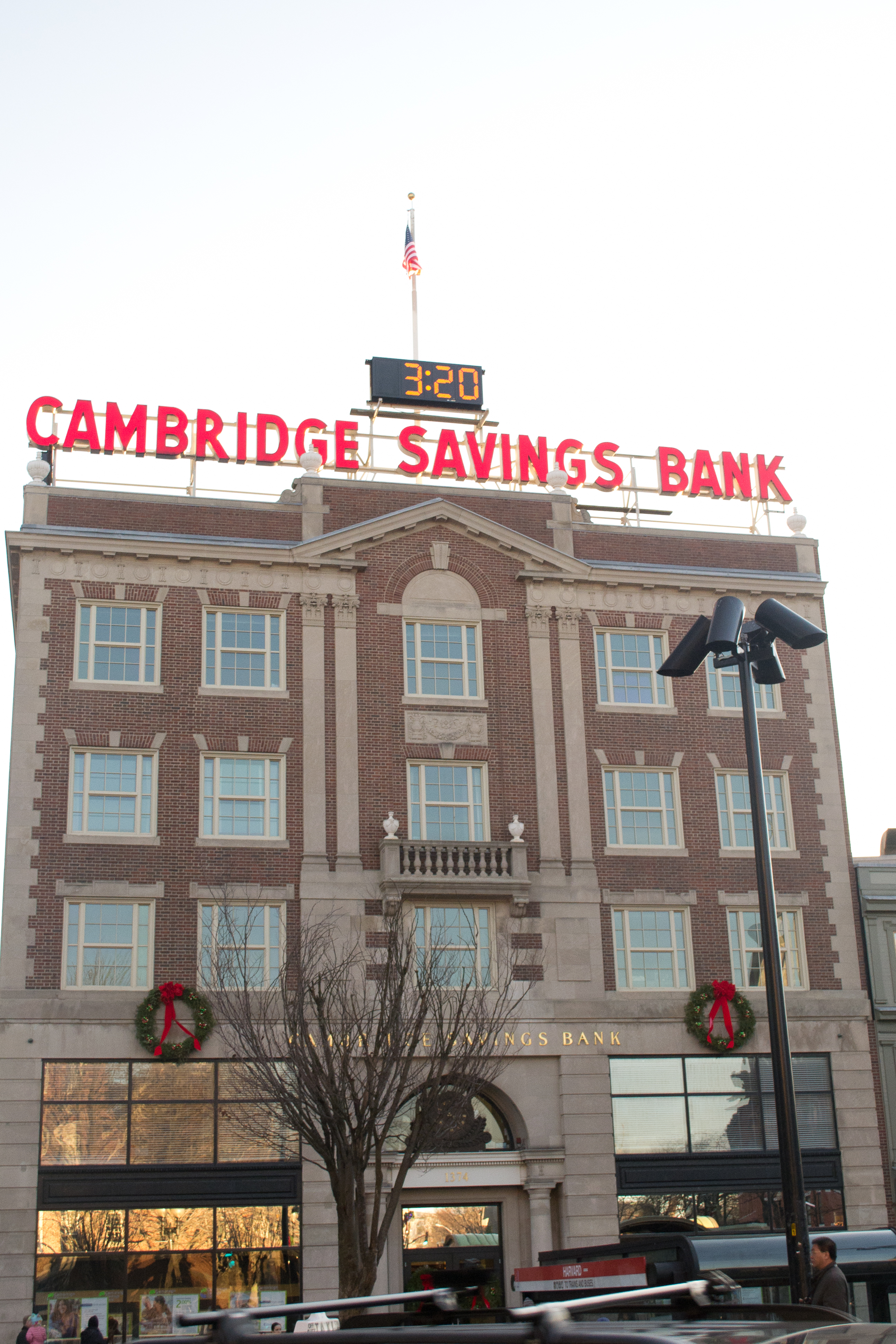
Cambridge Savings Bank Building, Cambridge, Massachusetts, 1923.

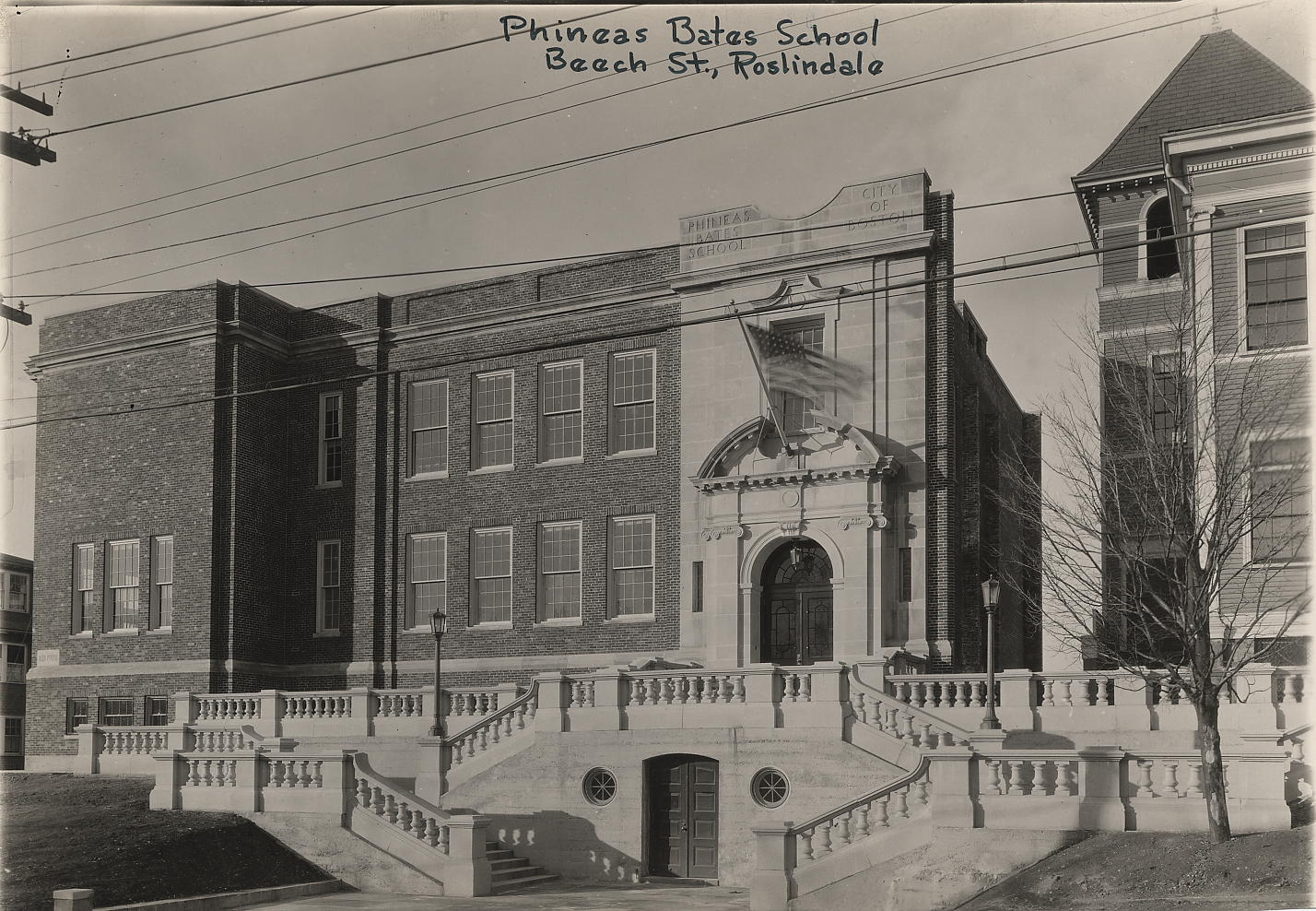
Phineas Bates School, Roslindale, Boston, Massachusetts, 1929.
