= Boston City Club =

Civic organization in Boston, Massachusetts

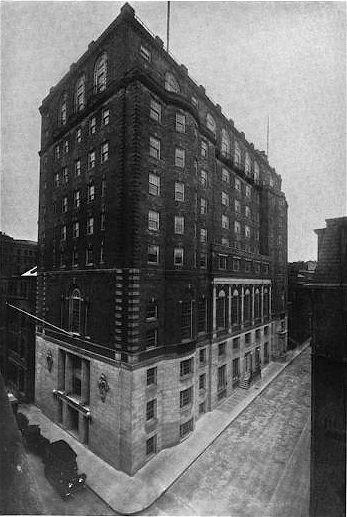
Boston City Club, Ashburton Place, Boston, 1915. Building designed by Newhall & Blevins.

The Boston City Club (est.1906) was a civc and social organization in Boston, Massachusetts. It was focused on "the city of Boston and the problems of its growth." Its founders included Louis D. Brandeis, Edward Filene, and Edmund Billings. Noted members include Fiske Warren.
