= Converse Memorial Library =

- U.S. National Register of Historic Places
- U.S. National Historic Landmark
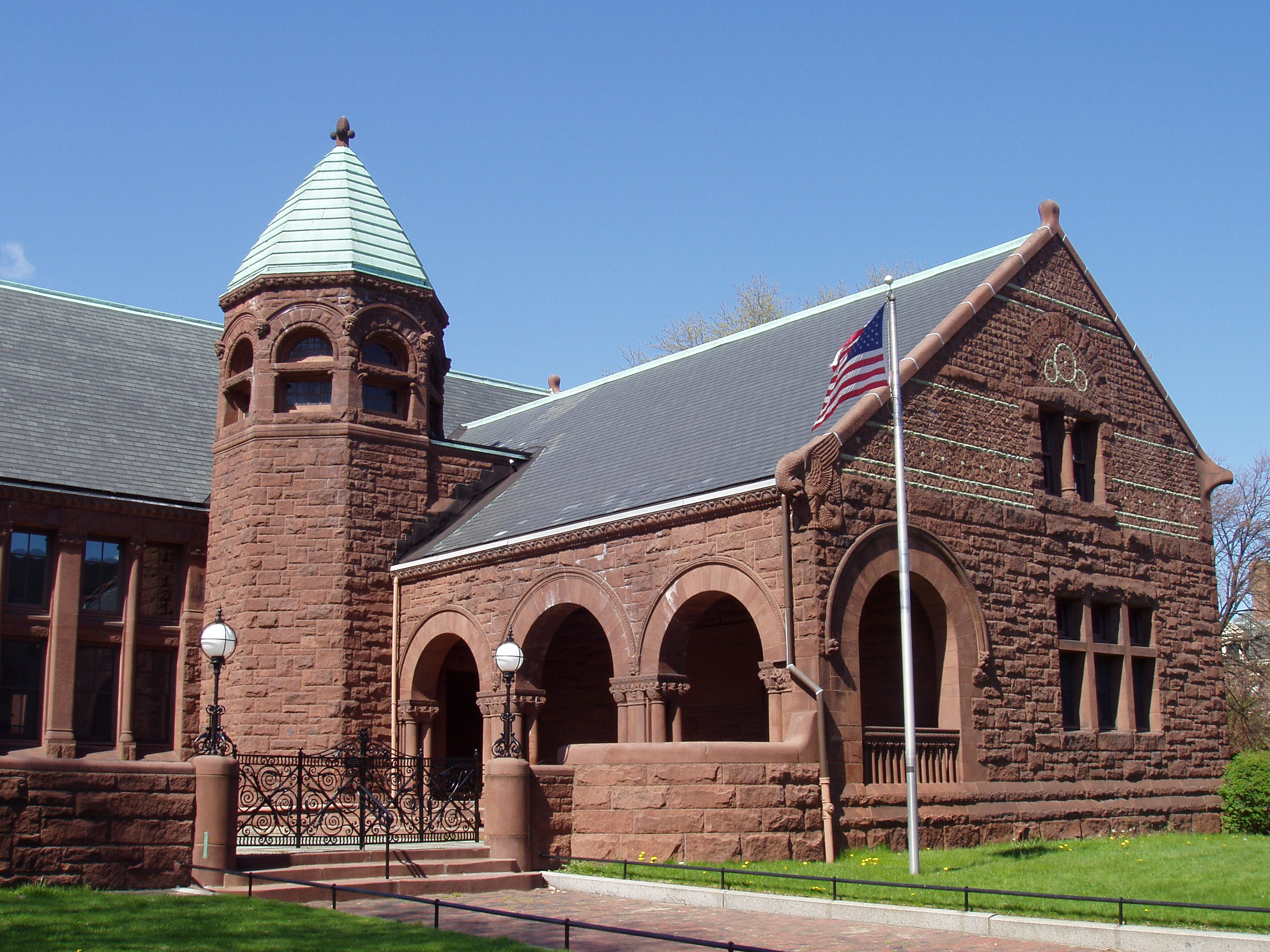
- Converse Memorial Building

- Location within Massachusetts Location within the United States
- Location: 36 Salem Street, Malden, Massachusetts
- Coordinates: 42°25′39″N 71°3′59″W
- Area: 1 acre (0.40 ha)
- Built: 1885
- Architect: H. H. Richardson; Shepley, Rutan & Coolidge; Newhall & Blevins
- Architectural style: Richardson Romanesque
- NRHP reference No.: 85002014

Significant dates
- Added to NRHP: September 05, 1985
- Designated NHL: December 23, 1987

The Converse Memorial Library (also known as Converse Memorial Building) is a historically significant building located in Malden, Massachusetts, and designed by noted American architect Henry Hobson Richardson. From 1885 to 1996, it housed the Malden Public Library, which now has moved most of its operations to a modern building adjacent to it. The older library building is located at 36 Salem Street, and is open to the public on a limited basis.

== History ==
The building was a gift of Elisha S. and Mary D. Converse in memory of their murdered son, Frank Eugene Converse, who was the victim of the first bank robbery/murder in North America. It was constructed 1883-1885 in an overall L-shape, with a facade of brown Longmeadow sandstone, a tower rising from the L's inner corner, and a heavily arched entry porch set within the L's short arm. The main library room is 50 by 36 feet (15 m × 11 m), and finished in elaborately carved white oak with a high, vaulted ceiling. Its furniture was designed by Richardson and manufactured by the Boston firm of A. H. Davenport and Company.

In 1896 two additions were made to the building, designed by Richardson's successor firm, Shepley, Rutan & Coolidge. One gable-roofed wing extends the building to the rear, along Park Street, following the same general lines of the existing structure. The other addition was a flat-roofed rectangular stack area also attached to the rear. An octagonal gallery space further extended the rear in 1916, designed by Newhall & Blevins.

The Converse Memorial Building was the last of Richardson's library designs, and is generally considered among his finest works. It was designated a National Historic Landmark in 1987.

The building contains galleries of artworks (primarily paintings), many of which were funded by the original donors to the building.

== In popular culture ==
The interior of the library's historic wing provided the setting for a scene in the movie Ted 2, starring Mark Wahlberg and Amanda Seyfried.

== See also ==
- National Register of Historic Places listings in Middlesex County, Massachusetts
- List of National Historic Landmarks in Massachusetts

== Gallery ==
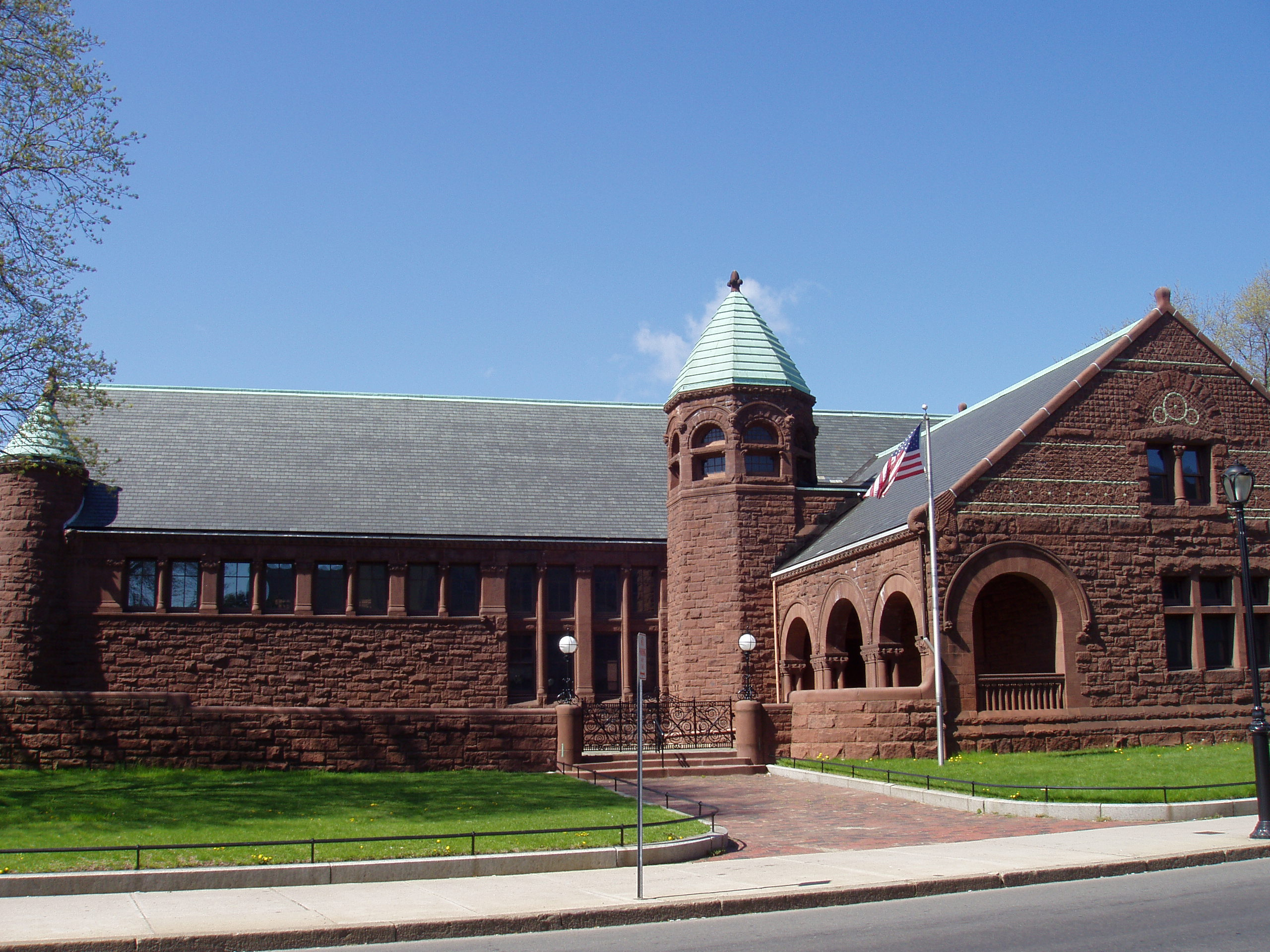
General view from street

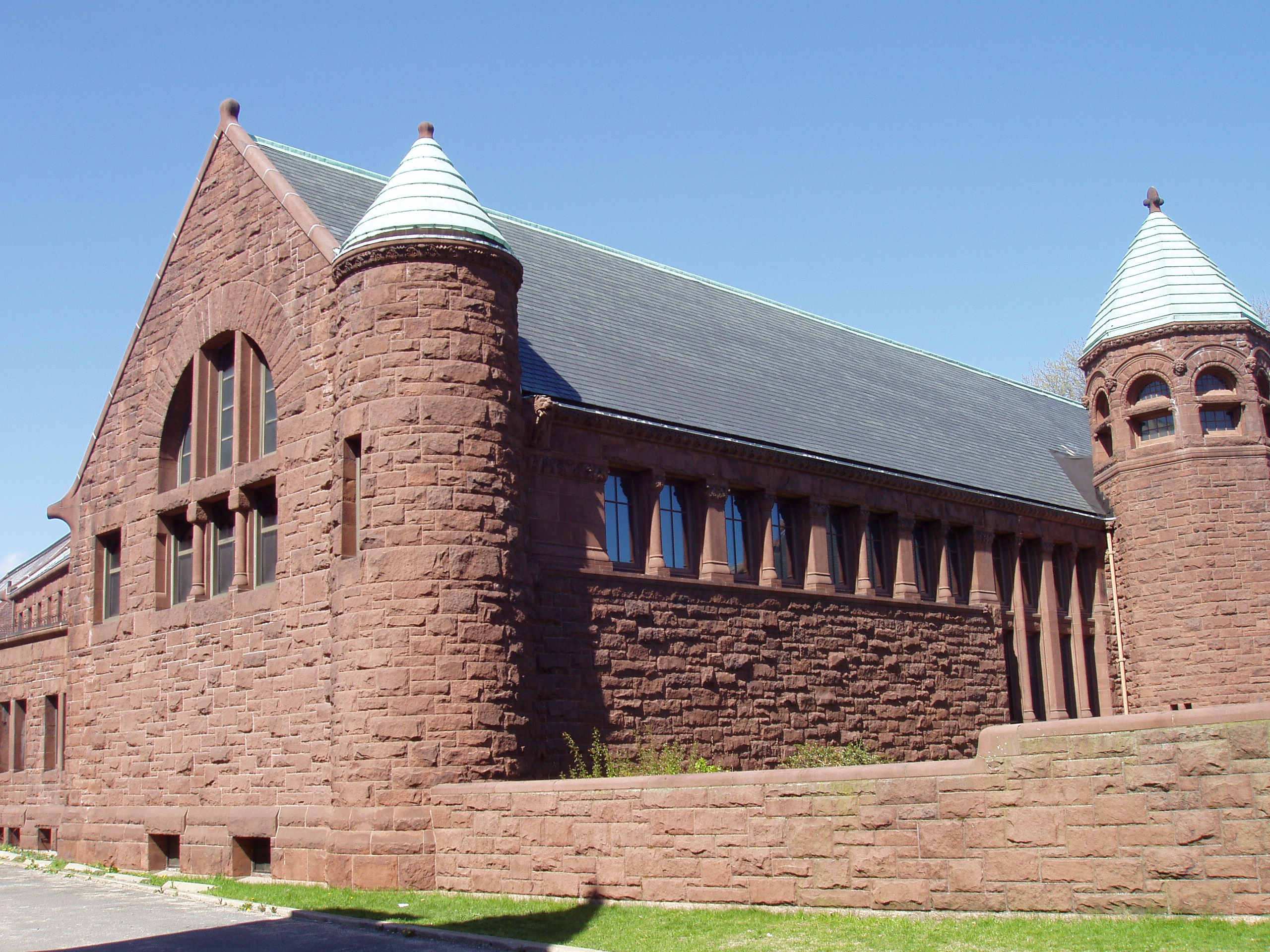
End view

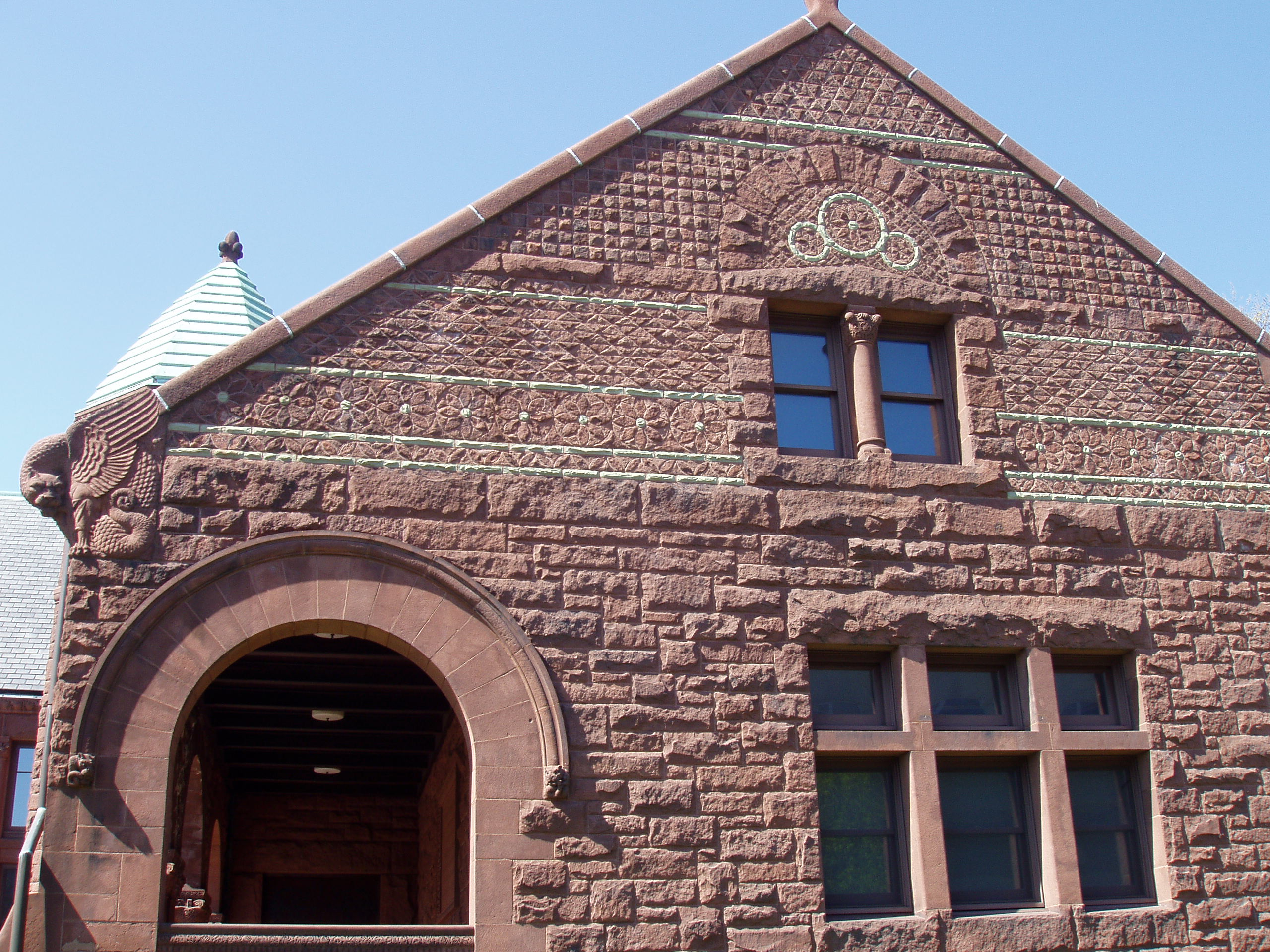
Facade decorations

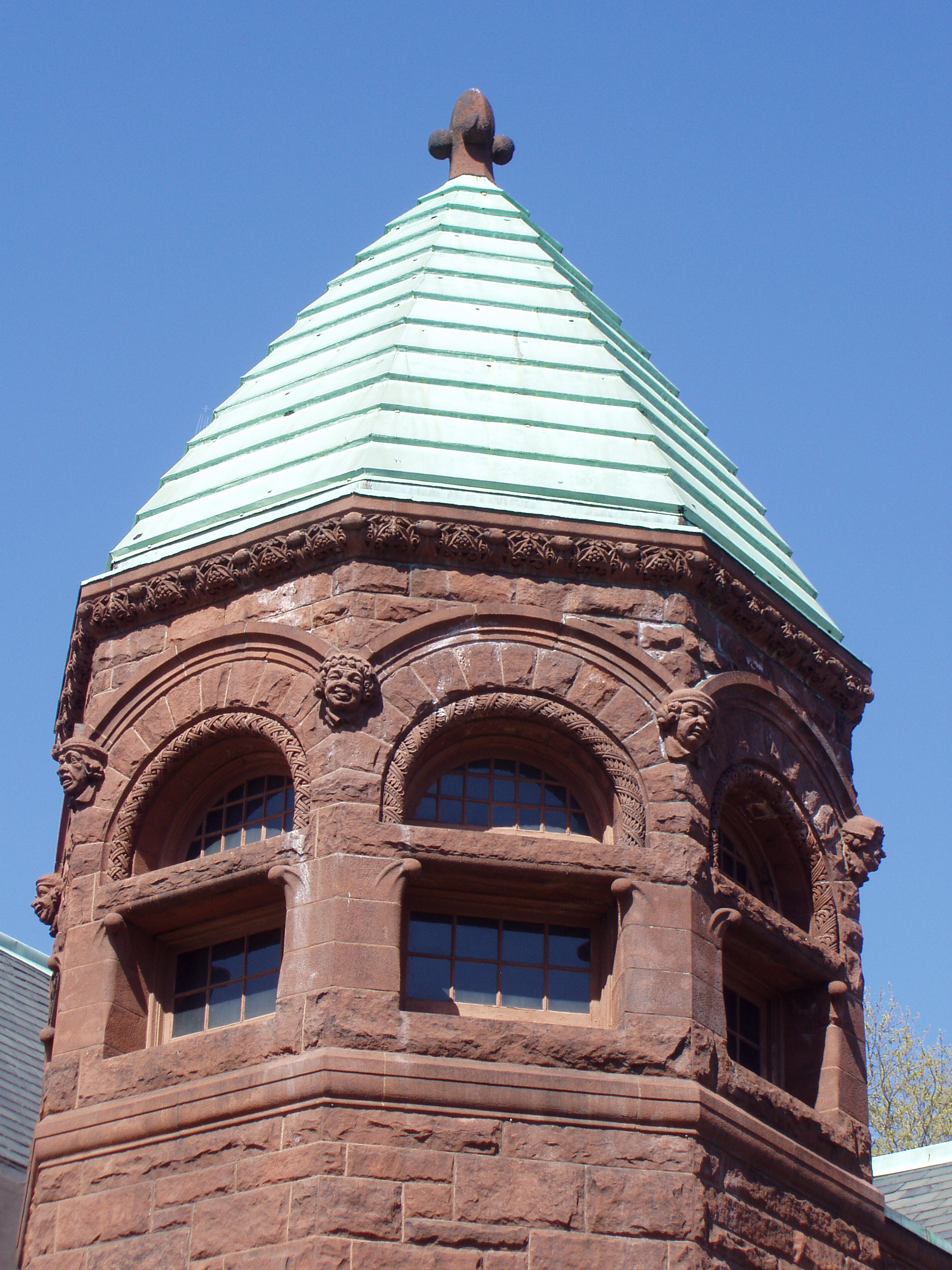
Tower detail

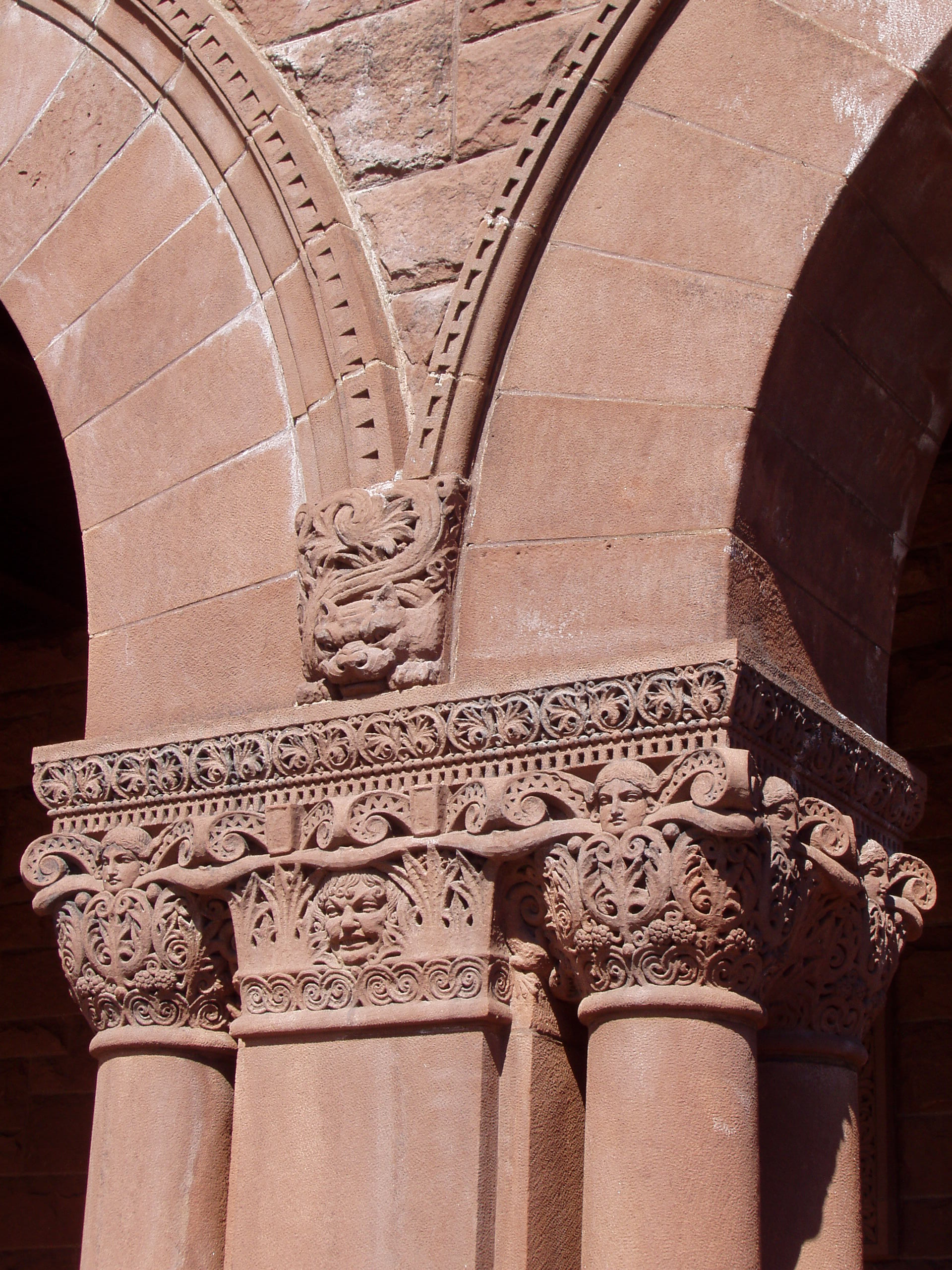
Columns

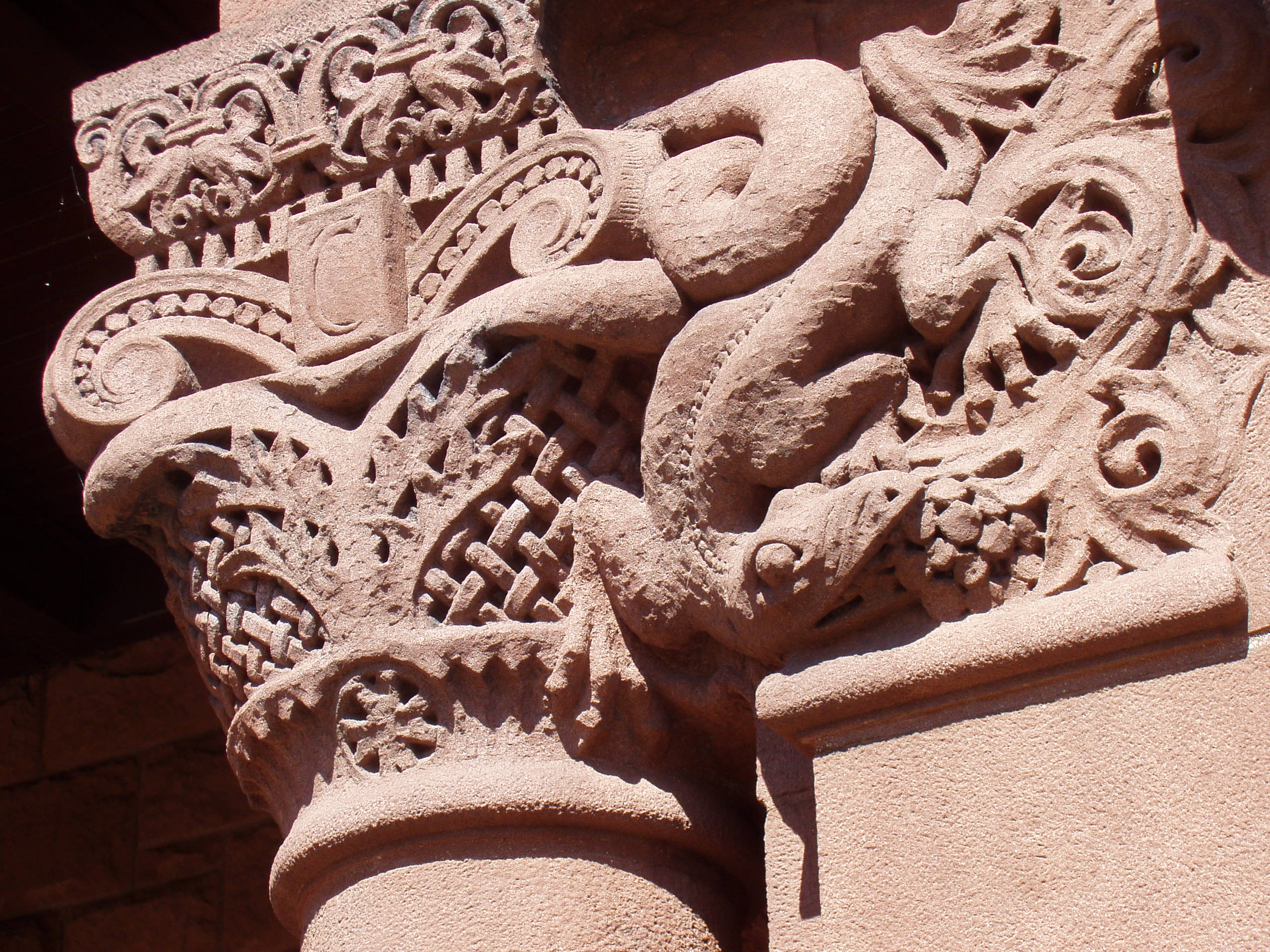
Detail

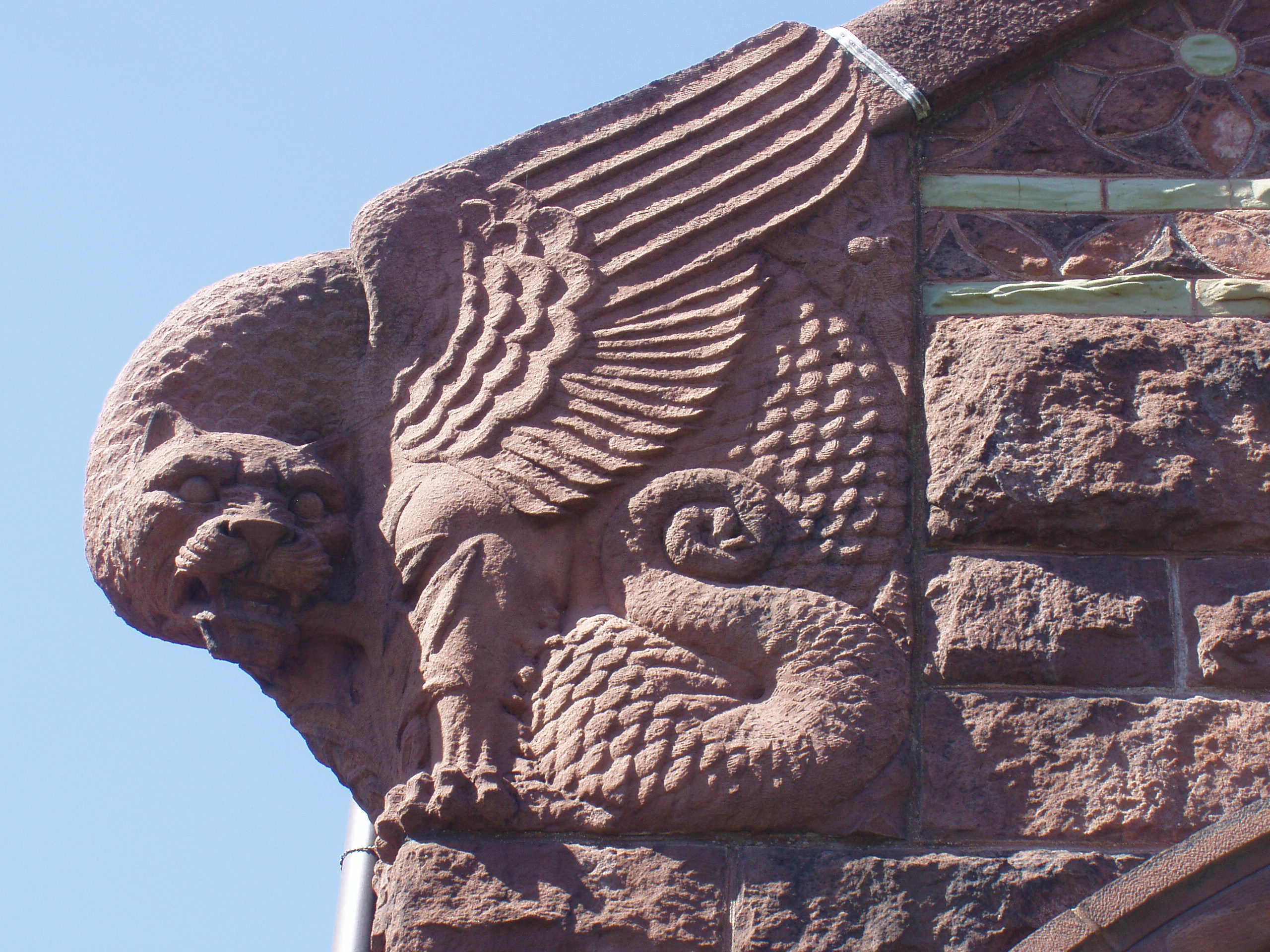
Ornament

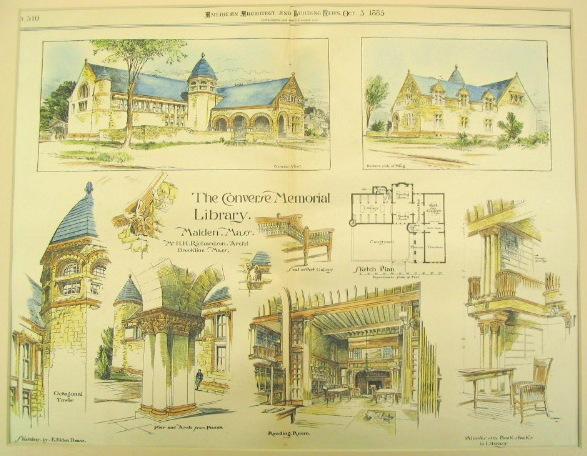
1885 illustrations of the library
