= Odd Fellows Hall =

Odd Fellows Hall, Independent Order of Odd Fellows Building, IOOF Building, Odd Fellows Lodge and similar terms are phrases used to refer to buildings that house chapters of the Independent Order of Odd Fellows fraternal organization. More specifically, these terms may refer to:

== Australia ==
- Glennie Hall, Warwick, Queensland
- IOOF Building (Adelaide), South Australia
- Jager Stores in Toodyay, Western Australia, an Oddfellows Hall from 1897 to 1908

== Canada ==
- Odd Fellows Hall (Victoria, British Columbia)
- IOOF Hall (Toronto), Ontario

== United Kingdom ==
- Oddfellows' Hall, Barton-upon-Humber
- Oddfellows' Hall, Chester
- Oddfellows' Hall, Devizes
- Oddfellows Hall, Edinburgh now used as a public house

== United States ==
=== A ===
- Oddfellows Hall (Fairbanks, Alaska), Alaska
- IOOF Building (Kingman, Arizona), in Mohave County, Arizona
- Independent Order of Odd Fellows Building (Benton, Arkansas), Arkansas
- Independent Order of OddFellows Building (Safford, Arizona), listed on the NRHP-Safford Annex

=== C ===
- Arroyo Grande IOOF Hall, Arroyo Grande, California
- Odd Fellows Hall (Eureka, California)
- Odd Fellows Hall (Gonzales, California)
- Odd Fellows Hall (La Grange, California)
- I.O.O.F. Hall (Mokelumne Hill, California), California
- Odd Fellows Temple (Pasadena, California), California
- Odd Fellows Building (Red Bluff, California), California
- Independent Order of Odd Fellows Building (San Diego, California)
- Odd Fellows Hall (Santa Ana, California)
- I.O.O.F. Hall (Woodbridge, California), California
- I.O.O.F. Building (Woodland, California), California
- IOOF Hall (De Beque, Colorado)

=== D ===
- Odd Fellows Hall (Washington, D.C.), 8th & D Streets NW, Washington, D.C., also a venue for Georgetown Hoyas men's basketball

=== G ===
- Odd Fellows Building and Auditorium, Georgia

=== I ===
- Independent Order of Odd Fellows Hall (Ashton, Idaho), Idaho
- I.O.O.F. Hall (Challis, Idaho), Idaho
- I.O.O.F. Building (Idaho Falls, Idaho), Idaho
- Montpelier Odd Fellows Hall, Montpelier, Idaho, Idaho
- Odd Fellows Hall (Salmon, Idaho), built 1874, Idaho
- Salmon Odd Fellows Hall, Salmon, Idaho, built 1907, Idaho
- Cedar Falls Independent Order of Odd Fellows, Cedar Falls, Iowa
- Wupperman Block/I.O.O.F. Hall, Davenport, Iowa, Iowa
- I.O.O.F. Hall (Dunlap, Iowa), Iowa
- I.O.O.F. Hall (Garnavillo, Iowa), Iowa
- Odd Fellows Hall (Monticello, Iowa), Iowa
- Odd Fellows Hall (Troy Mills, Iowa), Iowa

=== K ===
- IOOF Lodge (Alton, Kansas), Kansas
- Inman I.O.O.F. Hall, Inman, Kansas, listed on the NRHP in McPherson County, Kansas
- Odd Fellows Hall (Covington, Kentucky), Kentucky
- Odd Fellows Temple (Lexington, Kentucky), Kentucky
- Odd Fellows Building (Owensboro, Kentucky), Kentucky
- Odd Fellows Building (Pikeville, Kentucky), Kentucky

=== M ===
- Brooklin IOOF Hall, Brooklin, Maine, Maine
- Odd Fellows-Rebekah Hall (Cornish, Maine), Maine
- Odd Fellows Block (Lewiston, Maine), Maine
- West Paris Lodge No. 15, I.O.O.F., West Paris, Maine
- Odd Fellows Hall (Baltimore, 1831), built in 1831, demolished in 1890
- Odd Fellows Hall (Baltimore, 1891), Maryland
- Odd Fellows Lodge (Bel Air, Maryland), Maryland
- Odd Fellows' Hall (Beverly, Massachusetts), Massachusetts
- Odd Fellows' Hall (Buckland, Massachusetts), Massachusetts
- Odd Fellows Hall (Cambridge, Massachusetts), Massachusetts
- Odd Fellows Building (Malden, Massachusetts), Massachusetts
- Odd Fellows Valley Lodge No. 189 Building, Michigan
- St. Charles Odd Fellows Hall, St. Charles, Missouri,. Charles County, Missouri
- IOOF Hall and Fromberg Co-operative Mercantile Building, Fromberg, Montana, Montana
- IOOF Hall (Stevensville, Montana), Montana
- IOOF Lodge (Thompson Falls, Montana), Montana

=== N ===
- IOOF Hall and Opera House, Bladen, Nebraska, Nebraska
- IOOF Hall (Hunter, New York), New York
- Odd Fellows Hall (New York, New York)
- Odd Fellows Lodge (Goldsboro, North Carolina), North Carolina
- Odd Fellows Building (Raleigh, North Carolina), North Carolina
- Odd Fellows Block (Grand Forks, North Dakota), North Dakota

=== O ===
- Odd Fellows Hall (Hilliard, Ohio), Ohio
- Odd Fellows Temple (East Liverpool, Ohio), Ohio
- Odd Fellows Hall (Portsmouth, Ohio), Ohio
- Odd Fellows Hall (Sandusky, Ohio), Ohio
- I.O.O.F. Hall (Alva, Oklahoma), Oklahoma
- Adams Odd Fellows Hall, Adams, Oregon, Oregon
- IOOF Building (Ashland, Oregon), Oregon
- Clatskanie IOOF Hall, Clatskanie, Oregon, listed on the NRHP in Columbia County
- Enterprise IOOF Hall, Enterprise, Oregon, listed on the NRHP in Wallowa County
- Harrisburg Odd Fellows Hall, Harrisburg, Oregon, Oregon
- Lake Oswego Odd Fellows Hall, Lake Oswego, Oregon, Oregon
- Odd Fellows Building (Portland, Oregon), Oregon

=== R ===
- Oddfellows' Hall (East Providence, Rhode Island), Rhode Island

=== S ===
- Odd Fellows Building (Gary, South Dakota), South Dakota
- IOOF Hall (Fairburn, South Dakota)

=== U ===
- Odd Fellows Hall (Beaver, Utah), Utah
- Independent Order of Odd Fellows Hall (Salt Lake City, Utah), Utah

=== V ===
- Odd Fellows Hall (Burlington, Vermont)
- Odd Fellows Hall (Alexandria, Virginia)
- Odd Fellows Hall (Blacksburg, Virginia), Virginia
- Odd Fellows Hall (Occoquan, Virginia)

=== W ===
- Cheney Odd Fellows Hall, Cheney, Washington, Washington
- Vashon Odd Fellows Hall, Vashon Washington
- Odd Fellows Hall (Big Horn, Wyoming), Wyoming

== See also ==
- List of Odd Fellows buildings
- Odd Fellows (disambiguation)
- Oddfellows - Oddfellows in the U.K.
- Independent Order of Odd Fellows - Odd Fellows in the U.S.

For shorter, specifically named lists:

- Independent Order of Odd Fellows Building (disambiguation)
- Independent Order of Odd Fellows Hall (disambiguation)
- IOOF Building (disambiguation)
- Odd Fellows Block (disambiguation)
- Odd Fellows Building (disambiguation)
- Odd Fellows Lodge (disambiguation)
- Odd Fellows Temple (disambiguation)
