= Odd Fellows Building =

Odd Fellows Building may refer to:

in the United States

- Odd Fellows Building (Red Bluff, California), listed on the National Register of Historic Places (NRHP)
- Odd Fellows Building and Auditorium, Sweet Auburn, Atlanta, Georgia, NRHP-listed
- Odd Fellows Building (Owensboro, Kentucky), NRHP-listed
- Odd Fellows Building (Pikeville, Kentucky), NRHP-listed
- Odd Fellows Building (Malden, Massachusetts), NRHP-listed
- Odd Fellows Building (Raleigh, North Carolina), NRHP-listed
- Odd Fellows Building (Reno, Nevada), formerly NRHP-listed, but demolished and delisted
- Odd Fellows Building (Portland, Oregon), NRHP-listed
- Odd Fellows Building (Gary, South Dakota), NRHP-listed
- Odd Fellows Building (Casper, Wyoming), NRHP-listed

== See also ==
- List of Odd Fellows buildings
- Odd Fellows Hall (disambiguation)
