= National Register of Historic Places listings in Deuel County, South Dakota =

Location of Deuel County in South Dakota

This is a list of the National Register of Historic Places listings in Deuel County, South Dakota.

This is intended to be a complete list of the properties and districts on the National Register of Historic Places in Deuel County, South Dakota, United States. The locations of National Register properties and districts for which the latitude and longitude coordinates are included below, may be seen in a map.

There are 10 properties and districts listed on the National Register in the county.

This National Park Service list is complete through NPS recent listings posted March 21, 2025.

== Current listings ==
	Name on the Register	Image	Date listed	Location	City or town	Description
1	Deuel County Courthouse and Jail	Deuel County Courthouse and Jail	June 16, 1976 (#76001730)	Highway 22; 44°45′19″N 96°41′05″W	Clear Lake	Courthouse, built 1916, designed by Buechner & Orth. Attached jail built 1899.
2	East Highland Lutheran Church		February 18, 2000 (#00000120)	Approximately 6 miles northeast of Brandt; 44°40′29″N 96°31′31″W	Brandt	
3	First National Bank Building		December 2, 1977 (#77001242)	Off Highway 22; 44°47′34″N 96°27′24″W	Gary	
4	Herrick Barn		June 22, 2005 (#05000628)	0.5 miles northwest of the junction of County Road 310 and Highway 101; 44°47′43″N 96°28′01″W	Gary	
5	Hoffman Barn		October 26, 2005 (#05001188)	16937 482 Ave. 44°55′47″N 96°33′31″W	Revillo	
6	Kliegle Garage		September 29, 1999 (#99001213)	Lots 1 and 2 of the original townsite of Goodwin; 44°52′41″N 96°51′02″W	Goodwin	
7	Odd Fellows Building		June 3, 1976 (#76001731)	Main St. 44°47′34″N 96°27′24″W	Gary	
8	Old Cochrane Road Bridge	Old Cochrane Road Bridge	December 9, 1993 (#93001268)	Abandoned local road over the inlet to Lake Cochrane; 44°42′03″N 96°29′15″W	Brandt	
9	South Dakota Dept. of Transportation Bridge No. 20-153-210		December 9, 1993 (#93001286)	Local road over Cobb Creek; 44°40′27″N 96°34′28″W	Brandt	
10	South Dakota School for the Blind		May 26, 1988 (#88000570)	Coteau and 3rd Sts. 44°47′46″N 96°27′18″W	Gary	

== See also ==
- List of National Historic Landmarks in South Dakota
- National Register of Historic Places listings in South Dakota
