= Odd Fellows' Hall (Buckland, Massachusetts) =

- U.S. National Register of Historic Places
- U.S. Historic district – Contributing property
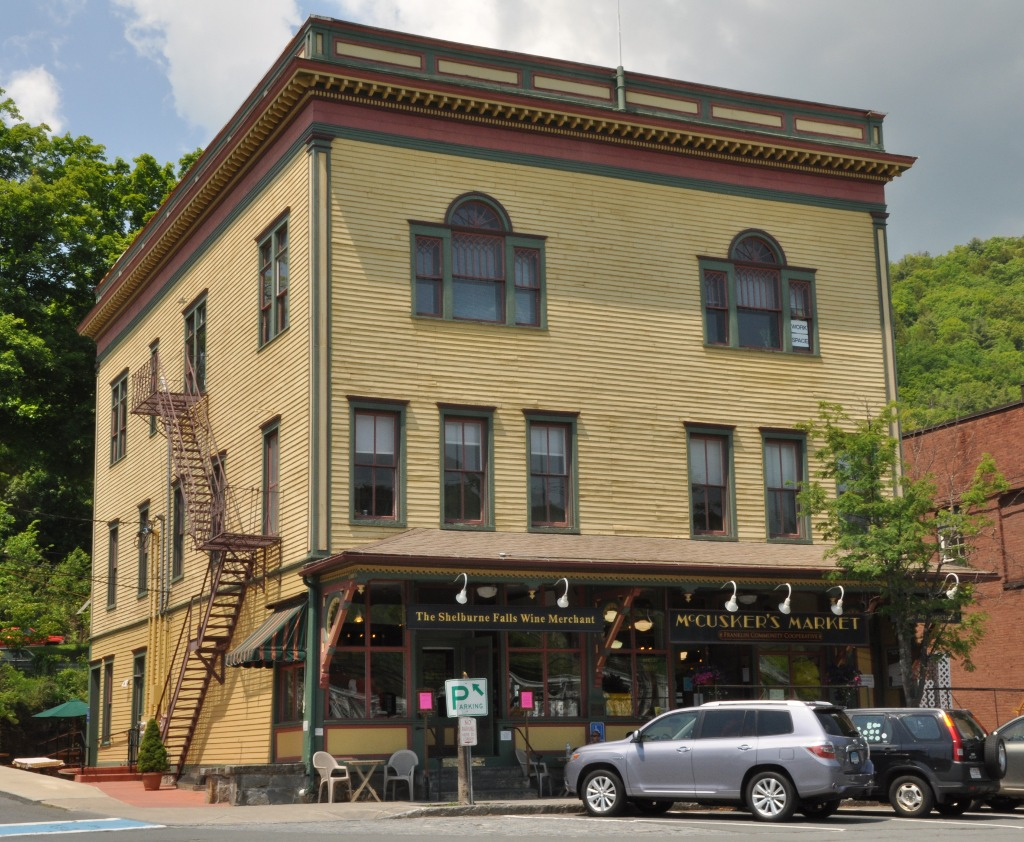

- Location within Massachusetts Location within the United States
- Location: Buckland (Shelburne Falls), Massachusetts
- Coordinates: 42°36′13″N 72°44′29″W
- Area: less than one acre
- Built: 1877; rebuilt 1895
- Part of: Shelburne Falls Historic District (ID87002548)
- NRHP reference No.: 79000345

Significant dates
- Added to NRHP: May 10, 1979
- Designated CP: January 28, 1988

The Odd Fellows' Hall is a historic Odd Fellows' hall at 1-5 State Street on the Buckland side of Shelburne Falls, Massachusetts. Built in 1877, and rebuilt after a damaging fire in 1895, it has been a focal point of the business district on the Buckland side of the village since its construction, serving an active Odd Fellows chapter until 1963. The building was listed on the National Register of Historic Places in 1979. In 1988 it was included in the Shelburne Falls Historic District.

== Description and history ==
The Odd Fellows Hall occupies a prominent location on the Buckland side of Shelburne Falls village, on the west side of State Street just south of the Deerfield River bridge joining Buckland to the Shelburne side of the village. It is a three-story wood frame structure, with a clapboarded exterior. The ground floor has two storefronts (presently unified in a single business), with recessed entrances flanked by large display windows. These are sheltered by a full-length portico support by large decorative brackets. The second floor has two groupings of three sash windows, and the third floor has a pair of Palladian window groupings. The building is crowned by a dentillated cornice and parapet.

The Shelburne Falls Odd Fellows chapter was organized in 1848, and originally met in space in another commercial building (no longer extant). After a major fire destroyed most of the commercial buildings on the Buckland side of the village in 1876, the chapter purchased a lot previously occupied by a hotel, and had this building erected. It was extensively damaged by fire in 1895, but the Odd Fellows rebuilt it. They used the building until 1962, after which it has served retail and commercial purposes. The building is notable in the village as one of the few surviving buildings in the village built with Victorian-era balloon framing methods.

== See also ==
- National Register of Historic Places listings in Franklin County, Massachusetts
- List of Odd Fellows buildings
- Independent Order of Odd Fellows Building
- Independent Order of Odd Fellows Hall
- Odd Fellows Block
- Odd Fellows Building
- Odd Fellows Hall
- Odd Fellows Lodge
- Odd Fellows Temple
