= South Dakota School for the Blind =

- U.S. National Register of Historic Places
- U.S. Historic district
- Location within South Dakota Location within the United States
- Location: Coteau and Third Sts., Gary, South Dakota
- Area: 11 acres (4.5 ha)
- Built: 1900
- Architectural style: Classical Revival
- NRHP reference No.: 88000570
- Added to NRHP: May 26, 1988

The former South Dakota School for the Blind campus is located on Coteau Street in Gary, South Dakota. The school served as a specialized facility for educating the state's blind children. Consisting of eight buildings constructed between 1899 and 1925, it is now home to the Buffalo Ridge Resort. The modern school, South Dakota School for the Blind and Visually Impaired, is in Aberdeen, South Dakota.

The campus was listed on the National Register of Historic Places in 1988.

== History ==
The citizens of Gary, South Dakota were invested in bringing a facility for blind people into the town, and initially proposed that their old Deuel county courthouse be used for the building, as they had lost their county seat and no longer had need for the courthouse. However, after inspection by the Board of Charities and Corrections, the town built a new building instead, to better accommodate the future students.

The South Dakota School for the Blind was opened on March 1, 1900, and was the United States' 42nd school for the blind. In 1945, the school came under the control of the South Dakota Board of Regents.

Beginning in 1957, plans for moving the school began, as the facilities were subpar and the students did not have access to a city. The school was moved to a new campus in Aberdeen in 1961, and after this the campus served for a few years as an elderly home.

== Education ==
The students who studied at South Dakota's School for the Blind followed a curriculum similar to that of their non-visually impaired peers. The school taught braille in addition to their general coursework, and various other courses on things like piano tuning, upholstery, and family and consumer sciences.

Additionally, the school kept its own animals and gardens for dairy, meat products, fruits, and vegetables, which were maintained by and served to the students and faculty who ate at the school.

One feature of the school was that it contained tunnels between the separate buildings, which allowed students to travel between buildings without having to go outside into the harsh South Dakota winters.

== Current use ==
In the 1980s the building which formerly housed South Dakota's original school for the blind fell out of use. In 2008, Joe Kolbach bought the campus and turned it into the Buffalo Ridge Resort.

Kolbach has also used the resort to house young adults who were formerly in the foster care system, in an effort to help them transition into adult life.

Some visitors at the resort have claimed to see ghosts of former students during their visits.

== See also ==
- National Register of Historic Places listings in Deuel County, South Dakota
