= Odd Fellows lodge =

Odd Fellows lodge is a lodge (and/or building) of the Odd Fellows fraternity.

As a name, it may refer to:

== United States ==
- IOOF Lodge (Alton, Kansas), listed on the National Register of Historic Places in Osborne County, Kansas
- Odd Fellows Lodge (Bel Air, Maryland), listed on the NRHP in Maryland
- Odd Fellows Lodge and Temple, listed on the NRHP in New York
- IOOF Lodge (Thompson Falls, Montana), listed on the National Register of Historic Places in Sanders County, Montana
- Odd Fellows Lodge (Goldsboro, North Carolina), listed on the NRHP in North Carolina

== See also ==
- List of Odd Fellows buildings
- Odd Fellows Hall (disambiguation)

== Odd Fellows Rituals: ==
- 1887: THE Independent Order of Odd Fellows' RITUALISTIC, SECRET, AND FLOOR WORK - 1887]
- 2004: Ritual of a Lodge of Odd Fellows under the Jurisdiction of The Sovereign Grand Lodge of the Independent Order of Odd Fellows 2004]
