= Odd Fellows Temple =

Odd Fellows Temple may refer to:

in Canada

- Odd Fellows Temple (Saskatoon), Listed as a historic property, located in Saskatoon, Saskatchewan

in the United States

- Odd Fellows Temple (Pasadena, California), listed on the NRHP in California
- Odd Fellows Temple (Lexington, Kentucky), listed on the NRHP in Kentucky
- Odd Fellows Temple (Waterville, Maine), listed on the NRHP in Maine
- Odd Fellows Temple (East Liverpool, Ohio), listed on the NRHP in Ohio

== See also ==
- List of Odd Fellows buildings
- Odd Fellows Hall (disambiguation)
