= South Dakota School for the Blind and Visually Impaired =

Coordinates: 45°26′52″N 98°28′52″W

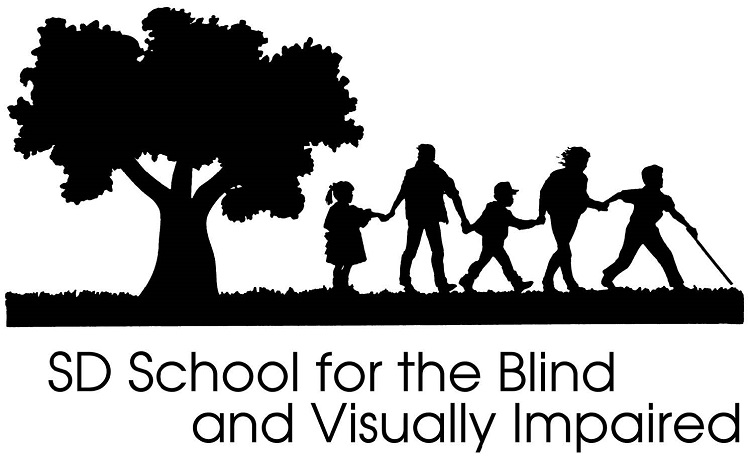
- 605 14th Ave SE; Aberdeen, South Dakota 57401-7201

Information
- Type: Public
- Motto: Preparing students to step forward with confidence and a vision of lifetime success
- Established: 1900
- President: South Dakota Board of Regents
- Head of school: Dr. Jessica Vogel, Superintendent
- Colors: Blue and Gold
- Athletics: Pioneers
- Affiliation: SDHSAA
- State Aid: $3,281,983
- Website: SDSBVI's official website

The South Dakota School for the Blind and Visually Impaired (SDSBVI) is a state-supported school located in Aberdeen, South Dakota, which provides services to meet the educational needs of children who are blind, visually impaired, or deaf-blind from birth through the age of 21. SDSBVI has been governed by the South Dakota Board of Regents since 1945.

Founded in 1900 in Gary, South Dakota, SDSBVI began as a charitable asylum. In 1917, the state legislature designated it for the "care, maintenance, and instruction of blind babies and children under school age". In 1925, the institution became the South Dakota School for the Blind, expanding the upper age limit to 21 years of age and providing students with up to 12 years of schooling at the state's expense.

On September 18, 1961, the school moved to its present location in Aberdeen, and in 1970 the name was changed to the South Dakota School for the Visually Handicapped to better address the range of students it served. In 1994, the school was accredited by the North Central Association of Colleges and Schools, and in 1998, the school adopted its current name as the South Dakota School for the Blind and Visually Impaired.

== Campus ==
The school has dormitory facilities.
