= I.O.O.F. Hall (Dunlap, Iowa) =

- U.S. National Register of Historic Places
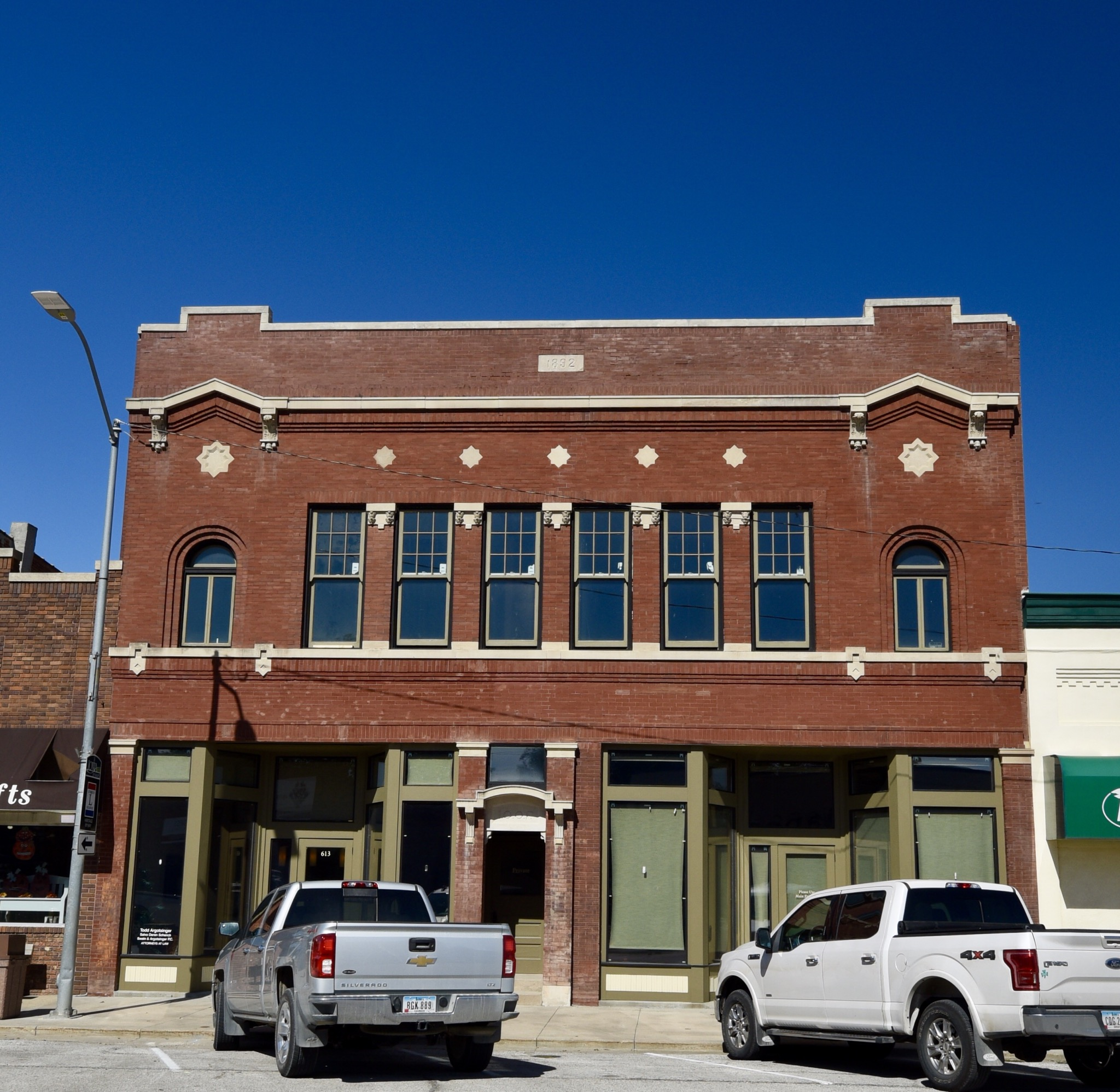

- Location within Iowa Location within the United States
- Location: 613-615 Iowa Ave. Dunlap, Iowa
- Coordinates: 41°51′16.3″N 95°36′04.3″W
- Architectural style: Renaissance Revival
- NRHP reference No.: 11000391
- Added to NRHP: June 23, 2011

The former I.O.O.F. Hall, located at 613-615 Iowa Avenue in the original commercial block of Dunlap, Harrison County, Iowa, is an historic two-story pedimented red-brick building built for local members of the Independent Order of Odd Fellows. Also known as the Odd Fellows Hall, it was used by Golden Rule Lodge No. 178, IOOF founded in 1869 and Guiding Star Encampment No. 68, IOOF, a higher body founded in 1874. Like many American lodge halls of the late 19th and early 20th centuries, it had business and commercial space on the ground floor while the lodge hall was upstairs. In 2009 it was renovated for its owner Brad Gross, CPA, who now uses it for his professional office. On June 23, 2011, it was added to the National Register of Historic Places.

== See also ==
- List of Registered Historic Places in Iowa
- Odd Fellows Hall
