= Herrick Barn =

- U.S. National Register of Historic Places
- Location within South Dakota Location within the United States
- Location: 0.5 miles northwest of the junction of County Road 310 and Highway 101, near Gary, South Dakota
- Coordinates: 44°47′43″N 96°28′01″W
- Area: less than one acre
- Built: 1899
- Built by: Herrick, "Captain" H.H.
- Architectural style: Bank Barn
- NRHP reference No.: 05000628
- Added to NRHP: June 22, 2005

The Herrick Barn, near Gary, South Dakota, is a Bank barn built in 1899 by "Captain" H.H. Herrick. It was listed on the National Register of Historic Places in 2005.

It was deemed to be "a significant example of a bank barn in South Dakota." It was built into the side of a hill and has a stone foundation visible on three sides. It is timber framed and has a gambrel roof.

Satellite imagery from 2018 suggests the barn no longer exists or the coordinates given here are not accurate.
