= First National Bank (Gary, South Dakota) =

- U.S. National Register of Historic Places
- Location: Off SD 22, Gary, South Dakota
- Coordinates: 44°47′34″N 96°27′24″W
- Area: less than one acre
- Built: 1917
- Architectural style: Classical Revival
- NRHP reference No.: 77001242
- Added to NRHP: December 2, 1977

The First National Bank in Gary, South Dakota is a building on South Dakota Highway 22 which was built in 1917. It was listed on the National Register of Historic Places in 1977.

It was deemed significant as "the only Neo-Classical Revival style commercial building in Gary. In addition to its singular quality, the structure is also a good example of South Dakota's work with the Neo-Classical Revival on a very small scale."

It is a one-story building constructed of cut limestone. Its facade includes two pilasters with Doric capitals, and modillions below the cornice.

It served as a bank from 1917 until the Great Depression.
