= Dunlap, Iowa =

- City
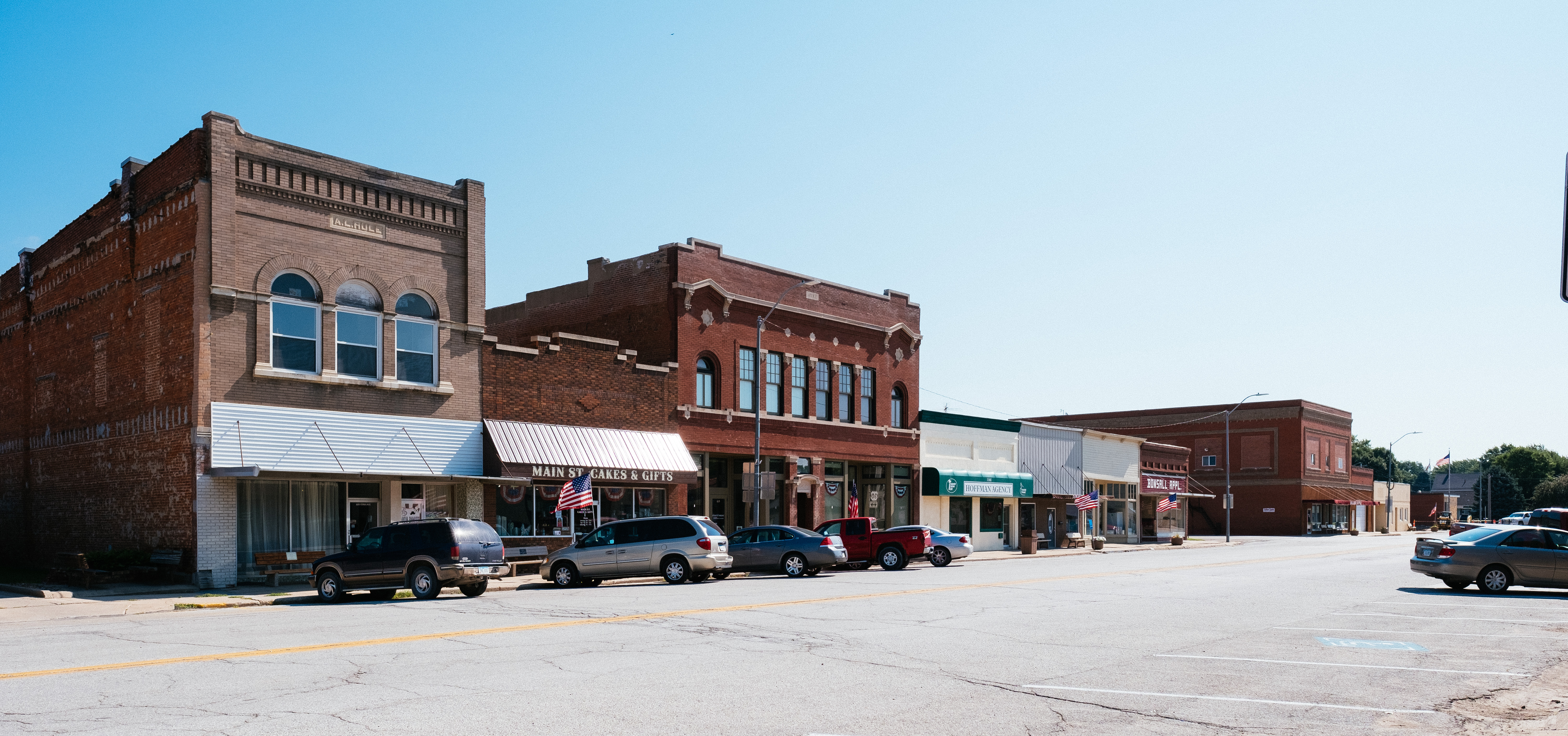
- Downtown Dunlap

- Location of Dunlap, Iowa
- Coordinates: 41°51′06″N 95°36′07″W
- Country: US
- State: Iowa
- Counties: Harrison, Crawford

Area
  - Total: 1.17 sq mi (3.03 km^{2})
  - Land: 1.15 sq mi (2.99 km^{2})
  - Water: 0.015 sq mi (0.04 km^{2})
- Elevation: 1,135 ft (346 m)

Population (2020)
  - Total: 1,038
  - Density: 900/sq mi (347.4/km^{2})
- Time zone: UTC-6 (Central (CST))
  - Summer (DST): UTC-5 (CDT)
- ZIP code: 51529
- Area code: 712
- FIPS code: 19-22890
- GNIS feature ID: 2394577
- Website: www.dunlapia.com

Dunlap is a city in Harrison and Crawford counties, Iowa, United States, along the Boyer River. The population was 1,038 at the time of the 2020 census.

== History ==
Dunlap was platted in 1867, and it was incorporated in 1871. The city was named for George L. Dunlap, General Superintendent of the Chicago & North Western railroad.

The location of Dunlap was within the final 50 miles of the railroad's Council Bluffs goal, connecting with the Union Pacific's transcontinental railroad building from Omaha. By January 1867, the engineering had been completed to Council Bluffs and by April 30 the first trains would be able to run all the way through, making this the first uninterrupted rail connection with the East. So with the concurrence of John B. Turner, former Pres. and Director of the C&NW, on February 13, 1867 George L. Dunlap wrote Isaac B Howe, Supt. of the Iowa Div.: "(Dunlap is)...the proper point for terminus of the Division, ...locating a town there and establishing comfortable homes for our men, thereby attaching them to the Co.'s interest and increasing their efficiency."

Dunlap's historic Independent Order of Odd Fellows Hall was added to the National Register of Historic Places in June 2011.

== Geography ==
Dunlap is located in the northeast corner of Harrison County and a small portion of the city extends north into Crawford County.

According to the United States Census Bureau, the city has a total area of 1.15 square miles (2.98 km^{2}), of which 1.13 square miles (2.93 km^{2}) is land and 0.02 square miles (0.05 km^{2}) is water.

Many street names in Dunlap are also street names in the Brooklyn, New York neighborhood of Brooklyn Heights.

== Demographics ==
Historical population
| Year | Pop. | ±% |
|---|---|---|
| 1880 | 1,246 | — |
| 1890 | 1,088 | −12.7% |
| 1900 | 1,355 | +24.5% |
| 1910 | 1,155 | −14.8% |
| 1920 | 1,455 | +26.0% |
| 1930 | 1,522 | +4.6% |
| 1940 | 1,550 | +1.8% |
| 1950 | 1,409 | −9.1% |
| 1960 | 1,254 | −11.0% |
| 1970 | 1,292 | +3.0% |
| 1980 | 1,374 | +6.3% |
| 1990 | 1,251 | −9.0% |
| 2000 | 1,139 | −9.0% |
| 2010 | 1,042 | −8.5% |
| 2020 | 1,038 | −0.4% |
Source:"U.S. Census website". United States Census Bureau. and Iowa Data Center; Source: U.S. Decennial Census

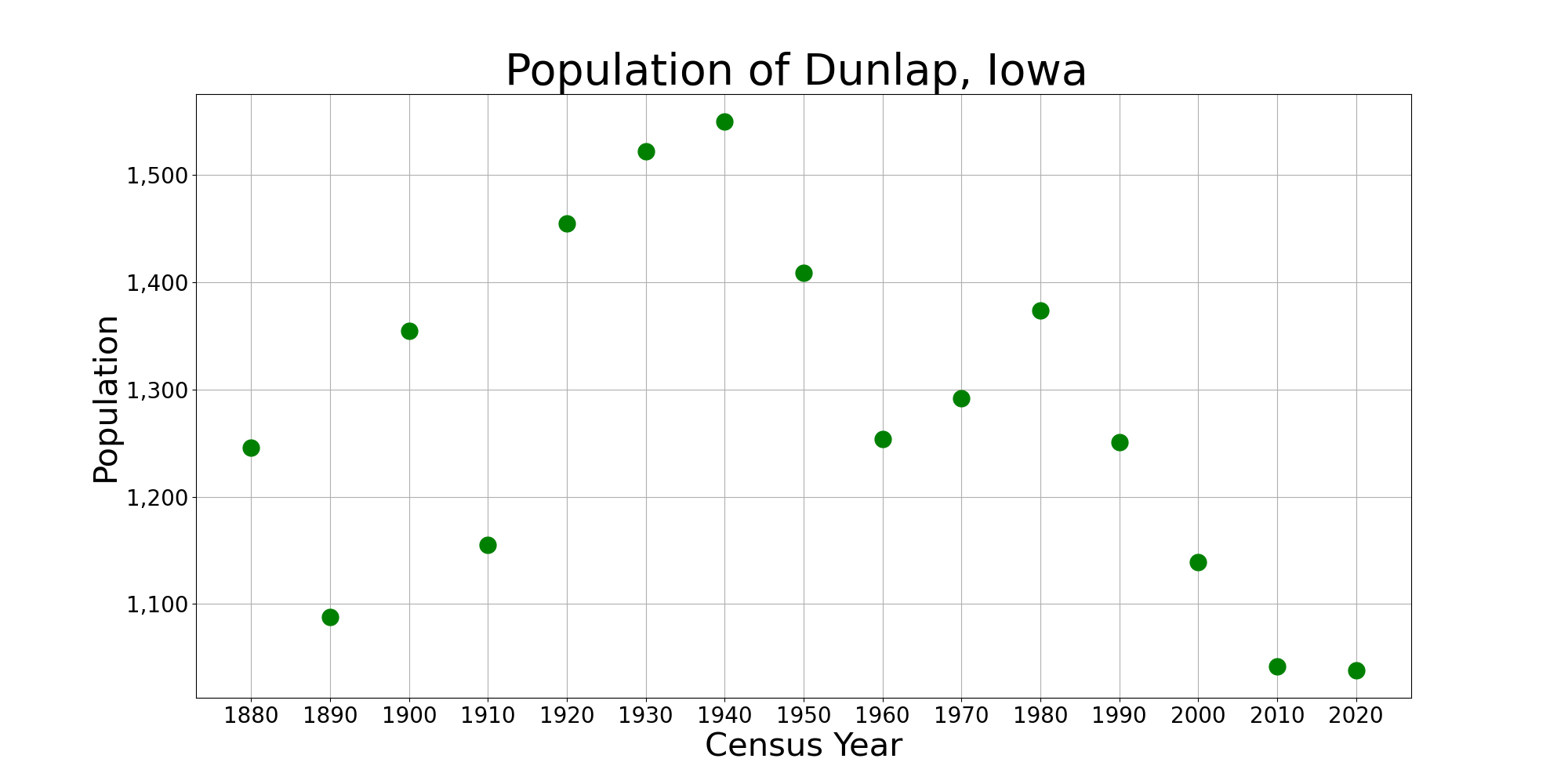
The population of Dunlap, Iowa from US census data

=== 2020 census ===
As of the 2020 census, there were 1,038 people, 451 households, and 267 families residing in the city. The population density was 899.9 inhabitants per square mile (347.4/km^{2}). There were 520 housing units at an average density of 450.8 per square mile (174.1/km^{2}). Of the housing units, 13.3% were vacant; the homeowner vacancy rate was 2.2% and the rental vacancy rate was 5.3%.

The median age in the city was 48.0 years. 20.6% of residents were under the age of 18. 22.7% of the residents were under the age of 20; 5.0% were between the ages of 20 and 24; 19.2% were from 25 to 44; 27.2% were from 45 to 64; and 25.9% were 65 years of age or older. For every 100 females there were 102.3 males, and for every 100 females age 18 and over there were 97.6 males age 18 and over. The gender makeup of the city was 50.6% male and 49.4% female.

Of the 451 households, 23.3% had children under the age of 18 living with them. Of all households, 43.0% were married-couple households, 6.0% were cohabitating-couple households, 27.7% had a female householder with no spouse or partner present, and 23.3% had a male householder with no spouse or partner present. 40.8% of all households were non-families, 34.8% of all households were made up of individuals, and 15.8% had someone living alone who was 65 years of age or older.

0.0% of residents lived in urban areas, while 100.0% lived in rural areas.

Racial composition as of the 2020 census
| Race | Number | Percent |
|---|---|---|
| White | 998 | 96.1% |
| Black or African American | 2 | 0.2% |
| American Indian and Alaska Native | 5 | 0.5% |
| Asian | 4 | 0.4% |
| Native Hawaiian and Other Pacific Islander | 0 | 0.0% |
| Some other race | 2 | 0.2% |
| Two or more races | 27 | 2.6% |
| Hispanic or Latino (of any race) | 9 | 0.9% |

=== 2010 census ===
As of the census of 2010, there were 1,042 people, 466 households, and 279 families living in the city. The population density was 922.1 inhabitants per square mile (356.0/km^{2}). There were 519 housing units at an average density of 459.3 per square mile (177.3/km^{2}). The racial makeup of the city was 98.0% White, 0.7% Native American, 0.2% Asian, and 1.2% from two or more races. Hispanic or Latino of any race were 0.8% of the population.

There were 466 households, of which 23.4% had children under the age of 18 living with them, 45.7% were married couples living together, 11.6% had a female householder with no husband present, 2.6% had a male householder with no wife present, and 40.1% were non-families. 37.8% of all households were made up of individuals, and 22.1% had someone living alone who was 65 years of age or older. The average household size was 2.15 and the average family size was 2.82.

The median age in the city was 46.9 years. 21% of residents were under the age of 18; 5.9% were between the ages of 18 and 24; 21.1% were from 25 to 44; 26.6% were from 45 to 64; and 25.5% were 65 years of age or older. The gender makeup of the city was 48.0% male and 52.0% female.

=== 2000 census ===
As of the census of 2000, there were 1,139 people, 483 households, and 282 families living in the city. The population density was 1,043.9 inhabitants per square mile (403.1/km^{2}). There were 524 housing units at an average density of 480.2 per square mile (185.4/km^{2}). The racial makeup of the city was 98.33% White, 0.18% African American, 0.26% Native American, 0.09% Asian, and 1.14% from two or more races. Hispanic or Latino of any race were 0.26% of the population.

There were 483 households, out of which 24.8% had children under the age of 18 living with them, 45.8% were married couples living together, 8.9% had a female householder with no husband present, and 41.6% were non-families. 37.3% of all households were made up of individuals, and 23.8% had someone living alone who was 65 years of age or older. The average household size was 2.24 and the average family size was 2.97.

22.4% are under the age of 18, 6.8% from 18 to 24, 23.6% from 25 to 44, 20.4% from 45 to 64, and 26.9% who were 65 years of age or older. The median age was 43 years. For every 100 females, there were 90.5 males. For every 100 females age 18 and over, there were 83.0 males.

The median income for a household in the city was $31,100, and the median income for a family was $39,762. Males had a median income of $26,094 versus $17,452 for females. The per capita income for the city was $17,936. About 6.8% of families and 10.5% of the population were below the poverty line, including 14.2% of those under age 18 and 9.2% of those age 65 or over.

== Economy ==
Dunlap is home to a small number of shops, two filling stations, two bars, a grocery store, and a feed manufacturing plant. There is a steak house, and two restaurants to serve customers.

== Education ==
The Boyer Valley Community School District operates public schools serving Dunlap. It was a part of the Dunlap Community School District until July 1, 1994, when it merged into the Boyer Valley district.

Boyer Valley South High School is located in Dunlap. It is the high school for the Boyer Valley Community School system. The Dunlap public library along with the school's library joined together by a grant when the new school was built, which was finished in 2004. Dunlap also has a large influx of the college age population that attend Buena Vista University in Storm Lake, IA.

== Notable people ==
- Charles W. Henney, Wisconsin politician
- Nadine Jeppesen, publisher of flight maps
