= Odd Fellows Hall (Cambridge, Massachusetts) =

- U.S. National Register of Historic Places
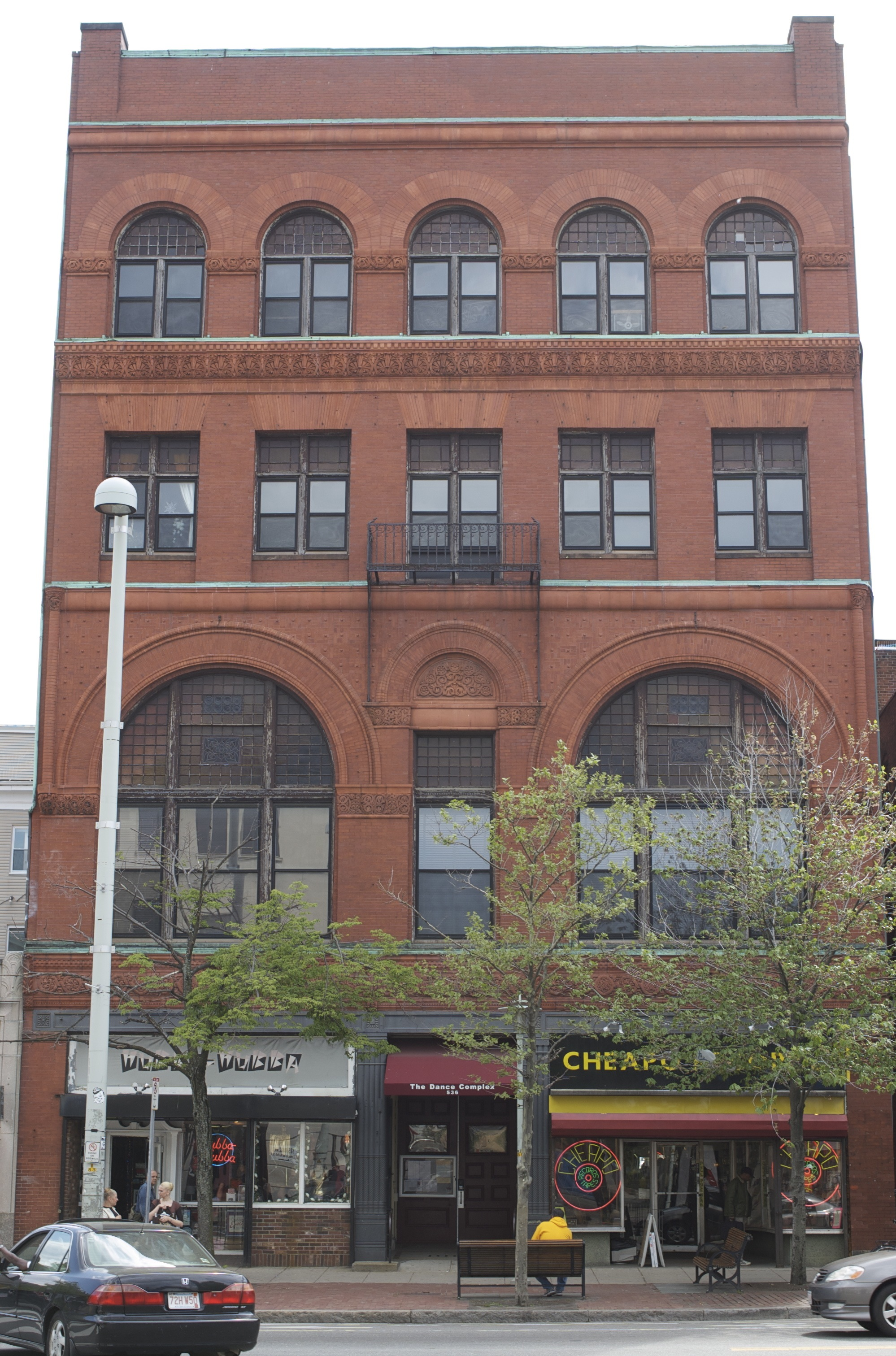

- Location within Massachusetts Location within the United States
- Location: 536 Massachusetts Avenue; Cambridge, Massachusetts
- Coordinates: 42°21′51.2″N 71°06′08.0″W
- Area: 1 acre (0.40 ha)
- Built: 1884
- Architect: Hartwell and Richardson
- Architectural style: Romanesque Revival
- MPS: Cambridge MRA
- NRHP reference No.: 82001967
- Added to NRHP: April 13, 1982

The former Odd Fellows Hall, located at 536 Massachusetts Avenue in Cambridge, Massachusetts, in the United States, is a historic building built in 1884 by members of the Independent Order of Odd Fellows. On April 13, 1982, it was added to the National Register of Historic Places. It is now The Dance Complex, founded by Rozann Kraus in 1991.

== History ==
The building was built in 1884 by members of the Independent Order of Odd Fellows. Like many lodge halls of the time, it had business and commercial space on the ground floor while the lodge hall was upstairs.

== Current use ==
The Odd Fellows Hall is now owned and run by the Dance Complex, founded by Rozann Kraus in 1991, which was formed to buy and save the building. The facilities include 6 dance studios and the Julie Ince Thompson Theatre.

== See also ==
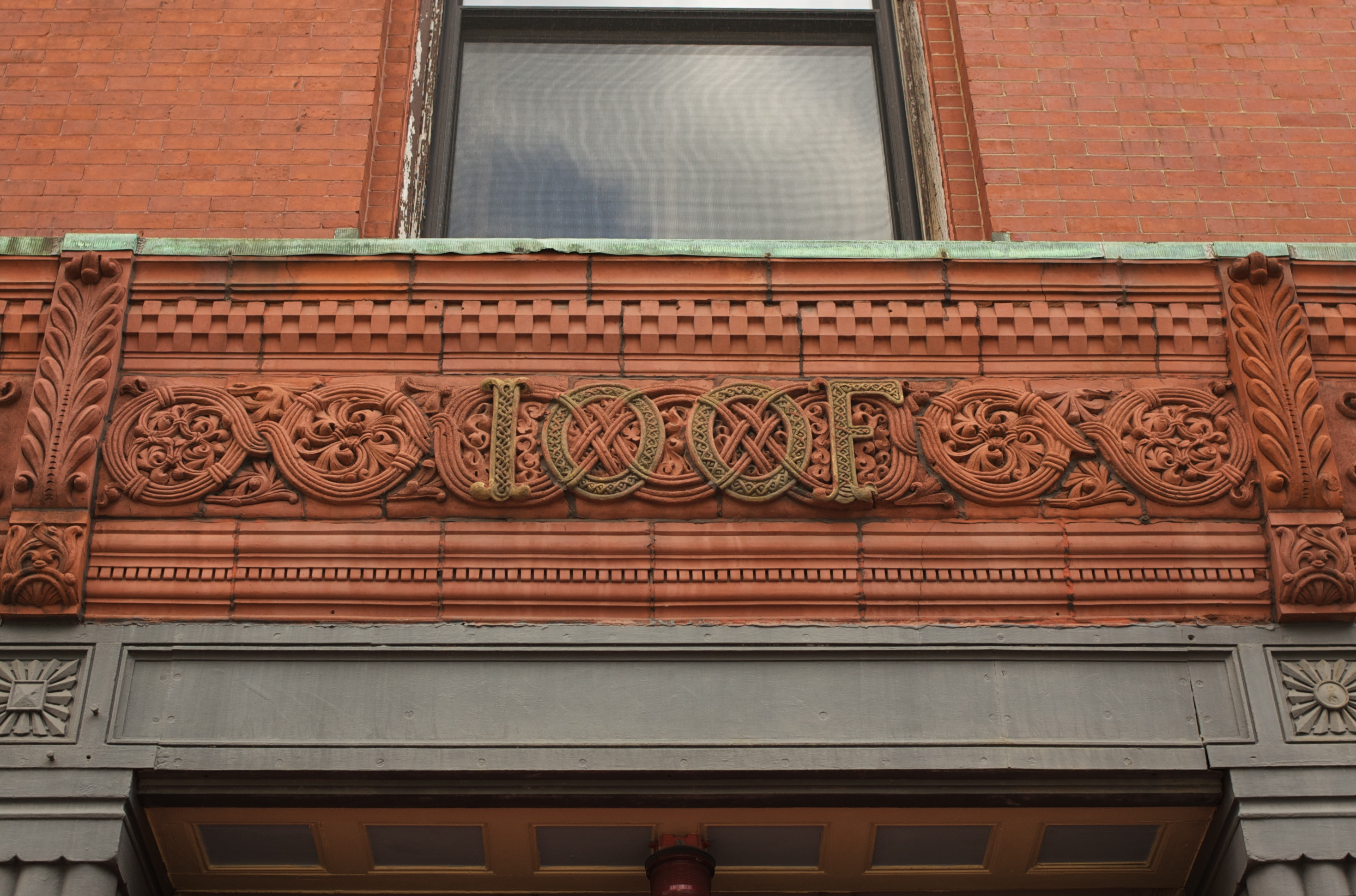
"IOOF" detail on building

- National Register of Historic Places listings in Cambridge, Massachusetts
- Odd Fellows Hall
