= Kliegle Garage =

- U.S. National Register of Historic Places
- Location: Lots 1 and 2 of the Original Townsite of Goodwin, Goodwin, South Dakota
- Coordinates: 44°52′41″N 96°51′02″W
- Area: less than one acre
- Built: 1916
- Built by: Kliegle, Ben
- Architectural style: Artificial stone
- NRHP reference No.: 99001213
- Added to NRHP: September 29, 1999

The Kliegle Garage in Goodwin, South Dakota, United States, was built in 1916. It was listed on the National Register of Historic Places in 1999.

It is a one-story building constructed with cast stone walls, 84 by 42 feet (26 m × 13 m) in plan.
