= I.O.O.F. Building (Woodland, California) =

- U.S. National Register of Historic Places
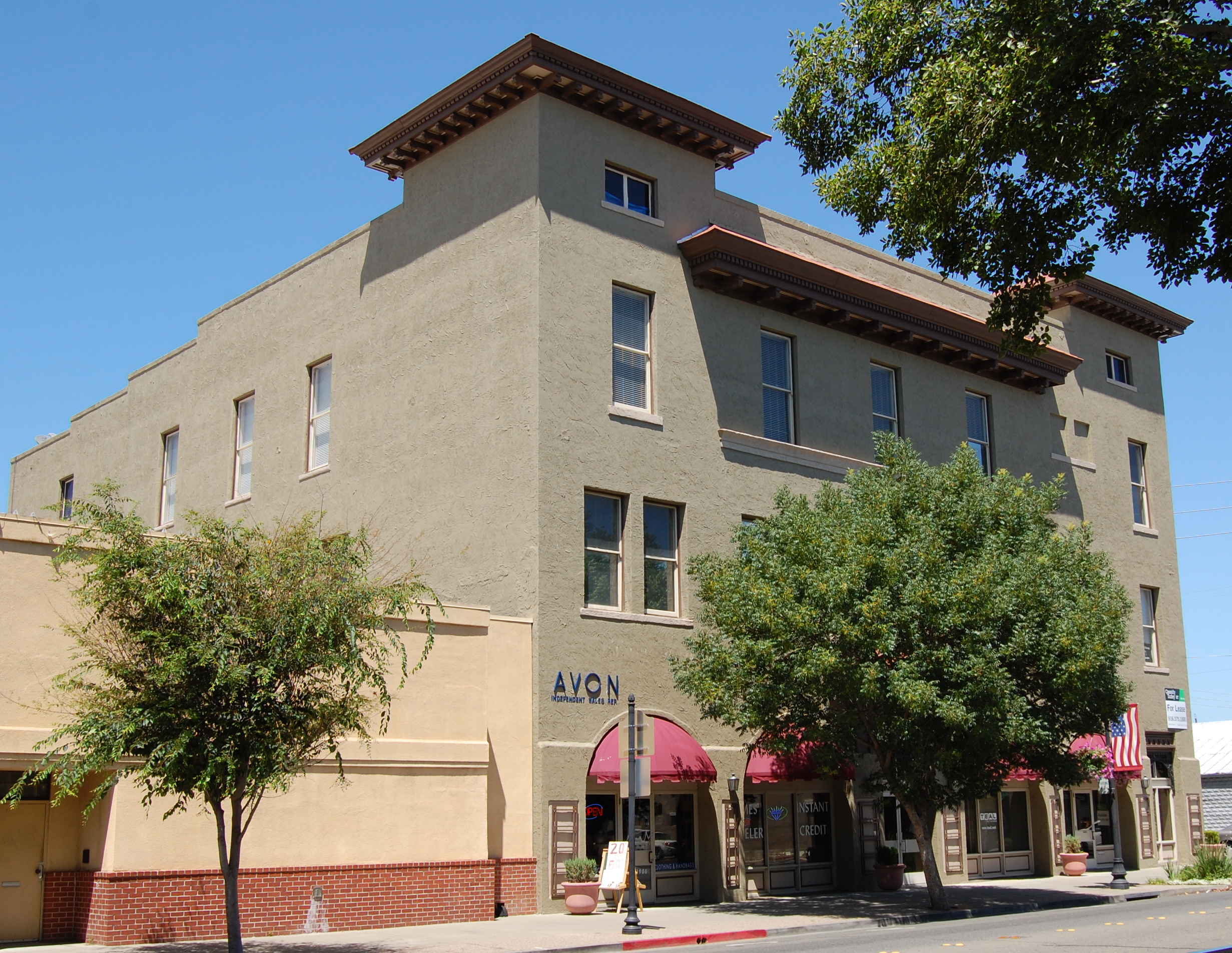
- The I.O.O.F. building as it appears in 2011.

- Location within California Location within the United States
- Location: 723 Main St., Woodland, California
- Coordinates: 38°40′40″N 121°46′11″W
- Area: 0.4 acres (0.16 ha)
- Built: 1905
- Architect: Curson, W.H.
- Architectural style: Mission Revival
- NRHP reference No.: 82002284
- Added to NRHP: February 25, 1982

The I.O.O.F. Building is an Independent Order of Odd Fellows building located in Woodland, Yolo County, Northern California.

== History ==
The building was built in 1905 in the Mission Revival style, making it the first prominent building in Woodland to use the style. It originally served as a store and a business college in addition to an Odd Fellows hall. The ground floor of the building has housed businesses, including the offices of the local telephone company, and various county offices; the second floor served as the Odd Fellows' social hall, and the third floor was used for their meetings. The third floor currently contains offices, and the largest of those once served as the offices of the Yolo County Traffic Court for a number of years, in the latter part of the 20th century. The building also has one floor below the street level, with offices and storage. The Odd Fellows Lodge in Woodland formed in 1863 and had 207 members and two associated chapters of the Rebekahs at the time its building was constructed.

The building is located in the Downtown Historic District of Woodland, California, on the Southwest corner of Main Street and Third Street, with its primary address on record at 725 Main Street. The building property extends to the rear all the way to Dead Cat Alley, directly adjacent to the Main Woodland Post Office. The building also has a rear address of 770 Dead Cat Alley.

The Woodland I.O.O.F. Building was listed on the National Register of Historic Places in 1982.
