= Odd Fellows Hall (Troy Mills, Iowa) =

- U.S. National Register of Historic Places
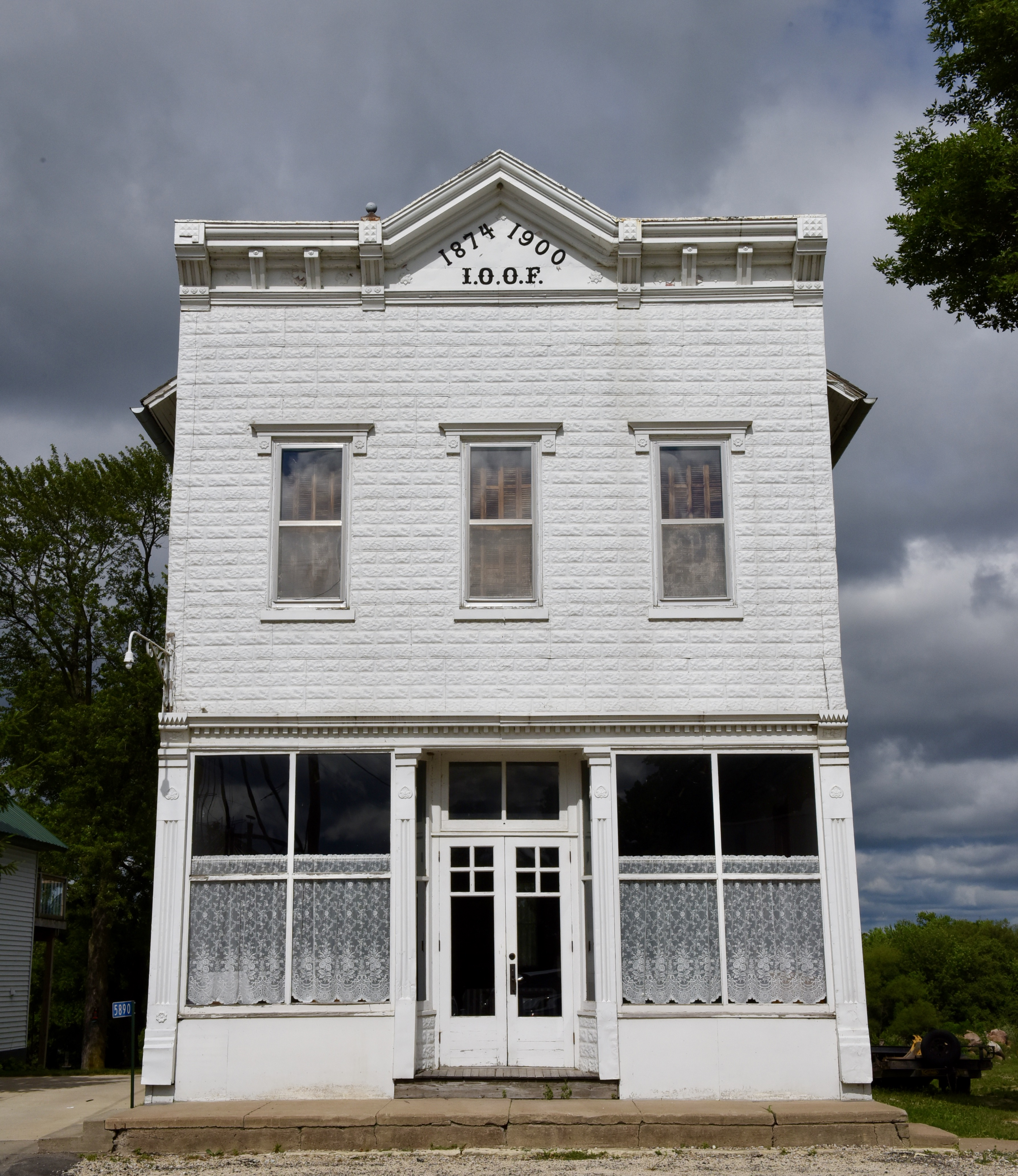

- Location within Iowa Location within the United States
- Location: Troy Mills Rd. Troy Mills, Iowa
- Coordinates: 42°17′20″N 91°40′57″W
- Area: less than one acre
- Built: 1900
- Architectural style: Italianate
- NRHP reference No.: 85003008
- Added to NRHP: October 10, 1985

The Odd Fellows Hall in Troy Mills, Iowa was built in 1900. It served as a meeting place of the local International Order of Odd Fellows organization. It has been deemed significant as "a rather late example of 'boomtown' construction dressed up in Italianate styling. It shows how the availability of materials like metal cornice, columns, etc. caused particular architectural styles or treatments to continue well past their heyday."

It was listed on the National Register of Historic Places in 1985.
