= South Dakota Board of Regents =

The South Dakota Board of Regents (also known as SDBOR) is a governing board that controls six public universities in the U.S. state of South Dakota. These include Black Hills State University, Dakota State University, Northern State University, South Dakota School of Mines and Technology, South Dakota State University, and the University of South Dakota. The Board also governs the South Dakota School for the Blind and Visually Impaired and the South Dakota Services for the Deaf and Hard of Hearing.

In control of all institutional decisions for the six public universities, the Board has an operating budget of approximately $318 million. As of June 2025, the members of the Board of Regents are as follows:

- Tim Rave, Baltic - president
- Jeff Partridge, Rapid City - vice president
- Randy Frederick, Hayti - secretary
- Griffin Petersen, Onida - student member
- Pam Roberts, Pierre - past president
- Judy Dittman, Madison
- James Lochner, Dakota Dunes
- Randy Rasmussen, Vermillion
- Miles Beacom, Sioux Falls

Of the current members, Roberts was appointed by former Governor Daugaard, Rave, Partridge, Frederick, Dittman, Lochner, and Rasmussen by former Governor Noem, and Petersen and Beacom by Governor Larry Rhoden.

== Institutions ==
School	Location	Enrollment	Est.	Endowment	Athletics
Black Hills State University	Spearfish	3,346	1883	$9,320,757	RMAC (NCAA Division II)
Dakota State University	Madison	3,774	1881	$9,794,185	Frontier (NAIA)
Northern State University	Aberdeen	3,708	1901	$60,416,274	NSIC (NCAA Division II)
South Dakota School of Mines and Technology	Rapid City	2,579	1885	$54,892,075	RMAC (NCAA Division II)
South Dakota State University	Brookings	12,065	1881	$102,875,539	Summit (NCAA Division I)
University of South Dakota	Vermillion	10,619	1862	$210,205,498	Summit (NCAA Division I)
South Dakota School for the Blind and Visually Imaired	Aberdeen		1900		N/A
South Dakota Services for the Deaf and Hard of Hearing	Statewide		1800		N/A

== Former Members ==
- Doug Morrison, Sioux Falls
- Jim Thares, Aberdeen
- Barb Stork, Dakota Dunes
- John W. Bastian, Belle Fourche
- Kevin Schieffer, Sioux Falls.
- Randy Shaefer, Madison
- Dr. Joan Wink, Howes
- Tony Venhuizen, Sioux Falls
- Bob Sutton, Sioux Falls
- Mr. Terry D. Baloun, Highmore.
- Dr. Richard G. Belatti, Madison.
- Dr. James O. Hansen, Pierre.
- Mr. Harvey C. Jewett, Aberdeen
- Pat Lebrun, Rapid City
- Rudy Nef, Milbank
- Kathryn O. Johnson, Hill City
- Dean M. Krogman, Brookings
- Randall K. Morris, Spearfish
- Carole Pagones, Sioux Falls

== Student Member ==
The student member was originally included in 1979. The student member is a full-voting member; the only difference between other board members is the student's term is two years compared to six of other members. The student is appointed by the governor and confirmed by the state senate.

== Former Student Members ==
- Jason Glodt, appointed in 1995 and re-appointed in 1996 by Governor Janklow. Glodt attended Black Hills State University and the University of South Dakota School of Law.
- Shane Penfield, appointed in 1998 by Governor Janklow and re-appointed by Governor Rounds in 2000 and 2002. Penfield attended the University of South Dakota for both his undergraduate education and law school. Penfield resigned upon graduation from the University of South Dakota School of Law.
- Tony Venhuizen appointed in 2003 to fill Shane Penfield's vacancy, and re-appointed in 2004 and 2006 by Governor Rounds. Venhuizen attended South Dakota State University and University of South Dakota School of Law. Venhuizen was later appointed by Governor Noem to serve as Regent again in 2021. In January 2025, following Kristi Noem's resignation and Larry Rhoden's elevation to governor, Rhoden chose Venhuizen as South Dakota's 40th Lieutenant Governor.
- Melanie Satchell appointed in 2008 by Governor Rounds. Satchell attended South Dakota School of Mines and Technology.
- Patrick Weber, appointed in 2010 and re-appointed in 2012 by Governor Daugaard. Weber attended the University of South Dakota School of Law. Weber resigned upon graduating from law school.
- Joseph Schartz, appointed in 2013 to fill the term of graduating law student, Patrick Weber, by Governor Daugaard. Schartz was re-appointed in 2014 by Governor Daugaard. Schartz attended South Dakota State University.
- Conrad Adam, appointed in 2016 by Governor Daugaard. Adam attended the University of South Dakota.
- Lucas Lund, appointed in 2018 by Governor Daugaard. Lund attended the University of South Dakota.
- Brock A. Brown, appointed in 2020 and re-appointed in 2022 by Governor Noem. Brown attended South Dakota State University and the University of South Dakota Knudson School of Law.
- Griffin Petersen, appointed in 2025 by Governor Rhoden. Petersen attends the University of South Dakota.

== See also ==
- List of colleges and universities in South Dakota
