= Odd Fellows Building (Gary, South Dakota) =

- U.S. National Register of Historic Places
- Location within South Dakota Location within the United States
- Location: Main St., Gary, South Dakota
- Coordinates: 44°47′34″N 96°27′24″W
- Area: less than one acre
- Built: 1898
- Architect: Oakes, A., Co.
- NRHP reference No.: 76001731
- Added to NRHP: June 3, 1976

The Odd Fellows Building is a historic commercial building on Main Street in Gary, South Dakota. It is a two-story brick building, with a decorative corbeled cornice. It has a typical retail plate-glass front on the first floor, and sash windows with stone lintels on the second floor. It was built in 1889 by the local chapter of the International Order of Odd Fellows, and was used both by that fraternal organization for its meetings and events, but also for local town meetings. The ground floor has housed a variety of commercial enterprises over the years, as well as a museum.

The building was listed on the National Register of Historic Places in 1976, for its architecture.

== See also ==
- National Register of Historic Places listings in Deuel County, South Dakota
