= Oddfellows' Hall, Devizes =

- Location in Wiltshire
- 51.3519°N 1.99223°W
- Location: 5 Maryport Street, Devizes, Wiltshire, United Kingdom
- OS grid reference: SU 00637 61425

History
- Built: 1873
- Built for: Odd Fellows Society

Site notes
- Architectural style: Gothic revival

Listed Building – Grade II
- Designated: 19 September 1972
- Reference no.: 1263034

The Oddfellows' Hall in Devizes, Wiltshire, England is a Grade II Listed building constructed in 1873 by the Odd Fellows Society.

== Architecture ==
The hall was built in 1873 in Gothic revival style in red brick. It is a two-storey building, the first floor of which has three large, pointed arch windows divided by rendered columns with foliate capitals. Above the main doorway is a commemorative war memorial to the members of the Society who died during the first World War.

== History and use ==
The Independent lodge of the Odd Fellows in Wiltshire was founded in 1820, followed in 1842 by another lodge named the Providential Dolphin lodge. The Oddfellows met at the Rising Sun public house until the construction of the Hall in 1873. The Hall was shared by both lodges until 1948 when the independent lodge was subsumed into the Providential Dolphin. From 1882 until at least 1900 the Hall was also used by a working men's club.

The building is currently used as a bank branch by Halifax.
