= Odd Fellows Hall (Victoria, British Columbia) =

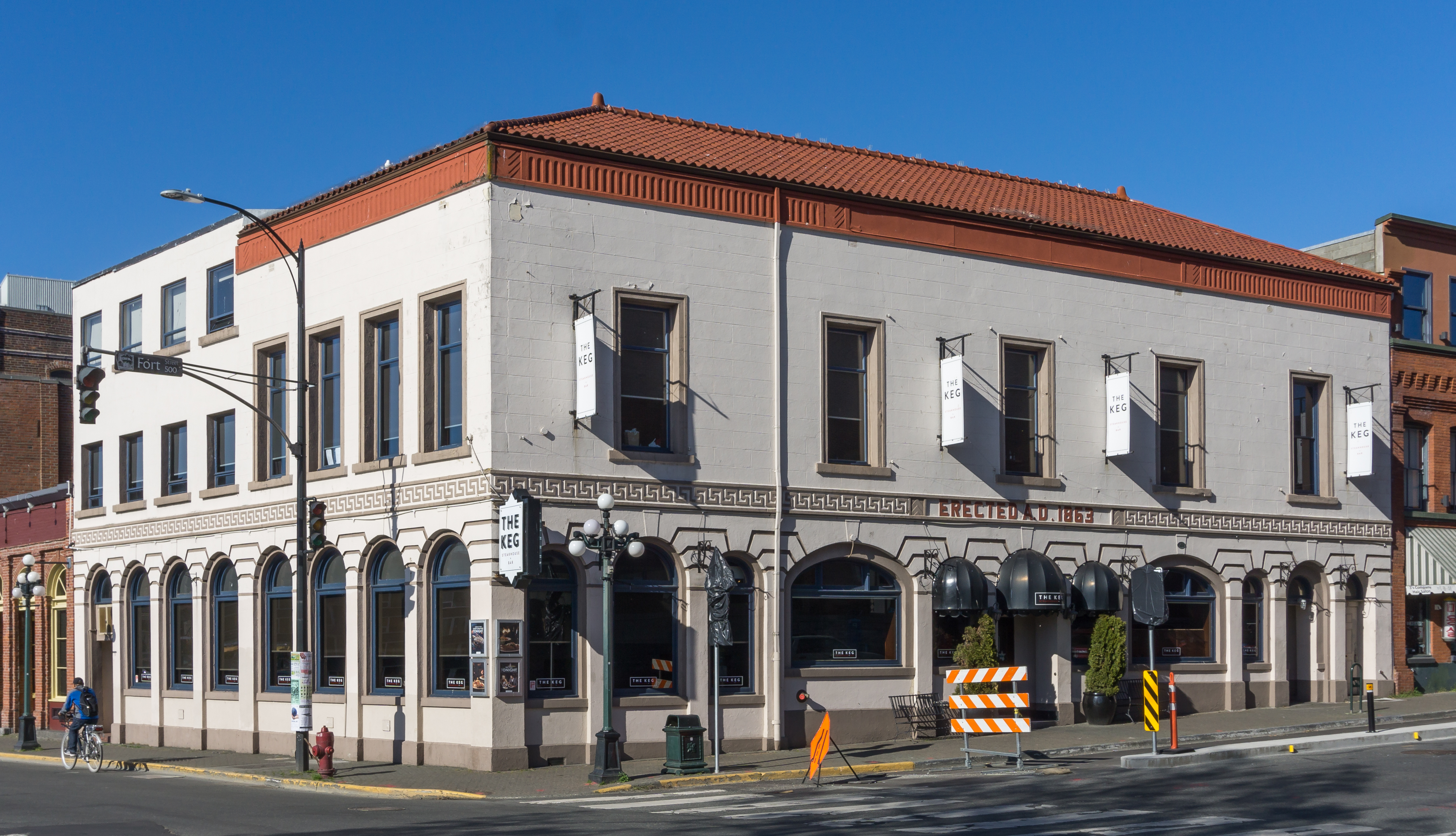
- The building's exterior in 2018
- Interactive map of the Odd Fellows Hall area

General information
- Location: 500 Fort Street; Victoria, British Columbia; V8W 1E5
- Coordinates: 48.4252°N 123.3695°W
- Current tenants: The Keg restaurant
- Completed: 1862

Technical details
- Floor count: 3

Odd Fellows Hall is a historic building in Victoria, British Columbia, Canada. It is located at the intersection of Wharf Street and Fort Street in downtown Victoria, and it is now the location of The Keg restaurant.

== See also ==
- List of historic places in Victoria, British Columbia
