= IOOF Hall (Hunter, New York) =

- U.S. National Register of Historic Places
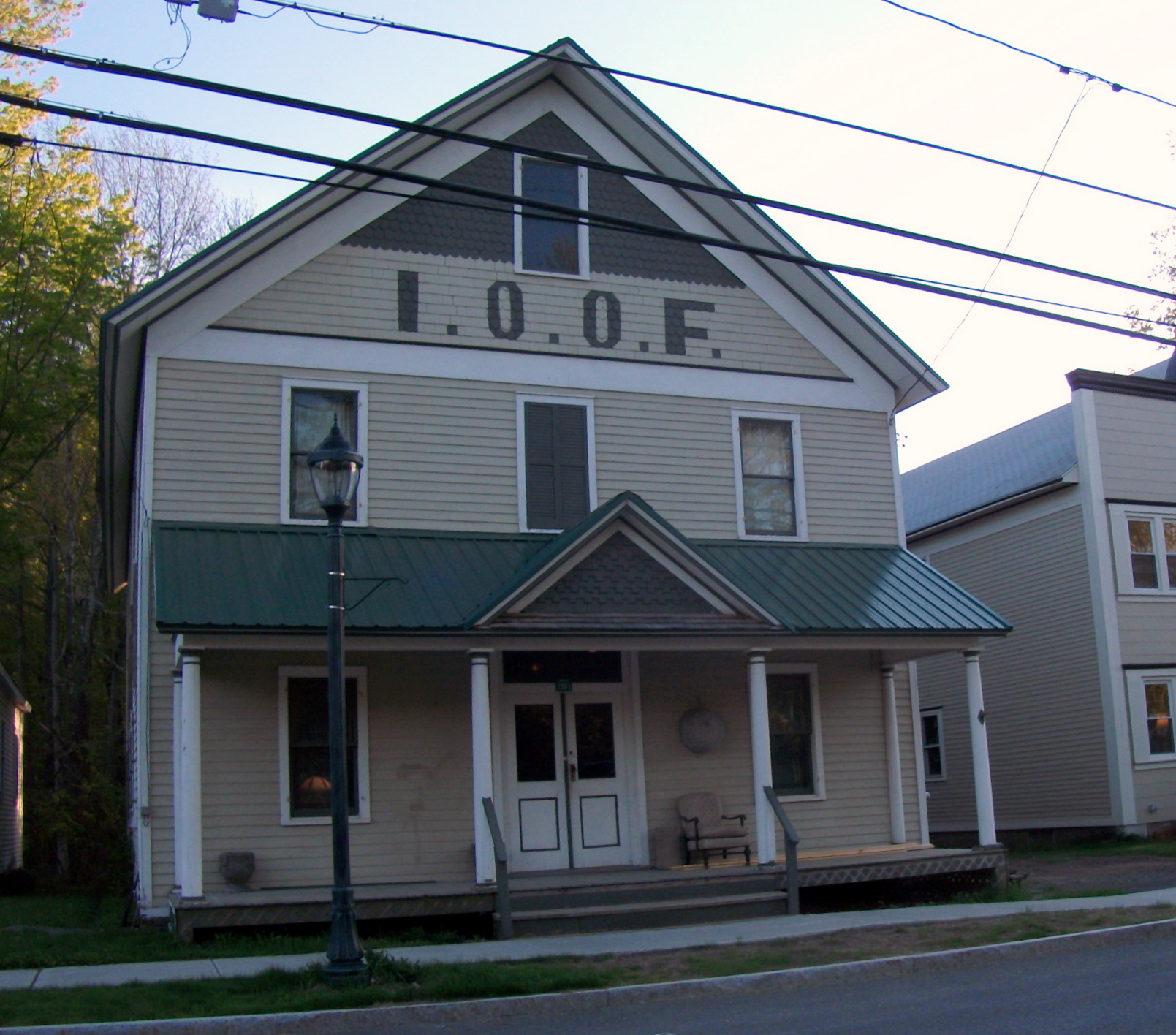
- IOOF Hall, May 2011

- Location within New York Location within the United States
- Location: 6325 Main St., Hunter, New York
- Coordinates: 42.21088°N 74.21568°W
- Area: less than one acre
- Built: 1913
- Architectural style: Queen Anne
- NRHP reference No.: 02001642
- Added to NRHP: December 31, 2002

IOOF Hall, also known as Lockwood Lodge No. 653, is a historic Independent Order of Odd Fellows building located at Hunter in Greene County, New York. It was built in 1917 and is a 2 1/2-story, three-by-six-bay, wood-frame gable-roofed structure. It was used as a fraternal hall until the late 20th century.

It was listed on the National Register of Historic Places in 2002.
