= Odd Fellows Block =

Odd Fellows Block may refer to:

in the United States

- Odd Fellows Block (Afton, Iowa), listed on the National Register of Historic Places
- Odd Fellows Block (Lewiston, Maine)
- Odd Fellows Block (Grand Forks, North Dakota)

== See also ==
- List of Odd Fellows buildings
- Odd Fellows Hall (disambiguation)
