= IOOF Building (Adelaide) =

Name of two buildings in Adelaide, South Australia

Coordinates: 34°55′24″S 138°36′07″E

IOOF Building may refer to two buildings in the centre of the city of Adelaide, South Australia. The first was built in the late 19th century and was demolished in the early-mid 1960s. As a result of this, the second was built as a "replacement" in the mid 1960s.

== 11-13 Flinders Street ==
The first "Headquarters" of the Grand Lodge of South Australia of the Independent Order of Odd Fellows (IOOF) was located in Flinders Street, just east of Victoria Square, in the Adelaide city centre.

It was a narrow 2 storey building of unremarkable external appearance. Upstairs was the Grand Lodge's meeting room, with an impressive polished jarrah floor, and was accessed by an imposing jarrah staircase. Downstairs were the offices of the Grand Lodge.

At the time, the Grand Lodge of South Australia ran a number of businesses supporting the aims of a fraternal organisation and friendly society providing services for its members:

- The major business was a non-profit voluntary health insurance fund for Lodge members and their families; this was before the days of the Australian version of Medicare when there was no compulsory universal health insurance. The Grand Lodge ran NHSA Branch No.2 (National Health Services Association).
- Sick and Funeral Fund - an insurance fund which paid benefits to contributors (or their beneficiaries) on production of evidence of sickness or death.
- Funeral Benefit Fund
- Endowment Assurance Fund - a type of maturing investment popular at the time.
- The Lodge was also associated with the FSMA (Friendly Societies' Medical Association, now trading as "National Pharmacies") which ran (and still does run) a chain of Chemist shops (pharmacies), mainly in the Adelaide metropolitan area, but also in a number of South Australia's regional centres, and recently, interstate.

In the 1960s, the Reserve Bank of Australia decided to build a new South Australian office on the corner of Flinders Street and Victoria Square, on land occupied by the buildings at 1-9 Flinders Street, and also on the lane between 9 & 11 Flinders Street. The IOOF Building was acquired by the Reserve Bank, the building was demolished, and the site turned into a lane.

The Grand Lodge moved to the basement of "Bowmans Building" in King William Street, purchased land at 47 Gawler Place, and commenced construction of a new office building. The new building was not to contain a Lodge meeting room; a much larger ex-Freemasons' meeting room in Castle Street, Parkside was purchased, renovated, and became the new meeting room of the Grand Lodge of South Australia.

== 47 Gawler Place ==
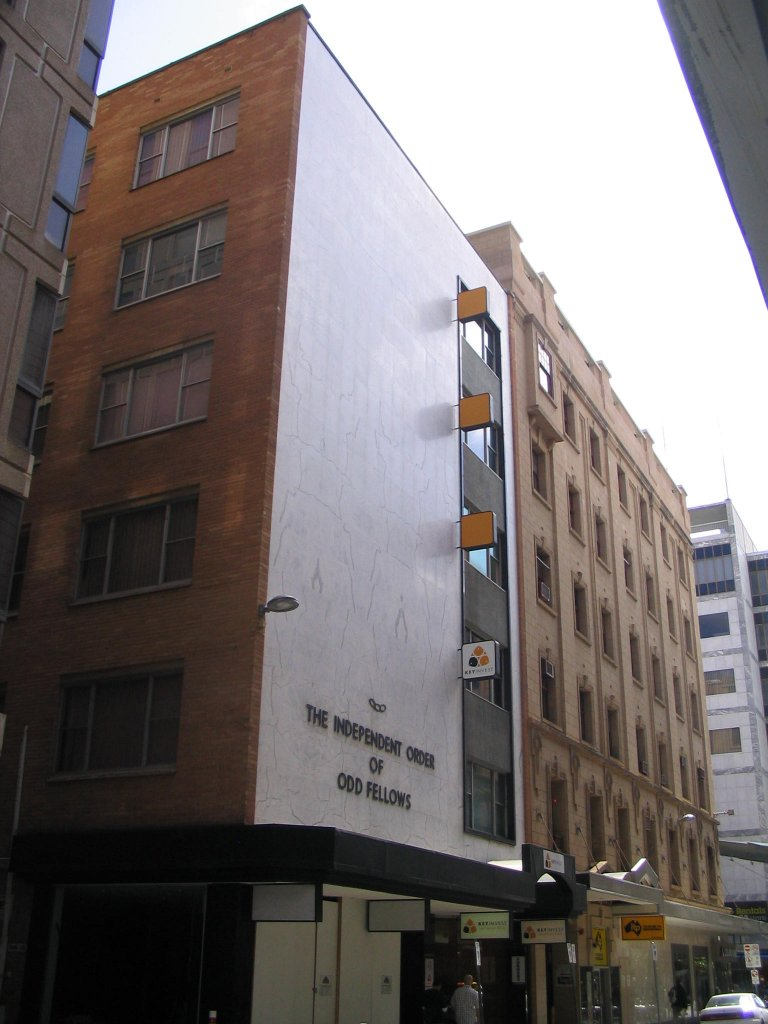
"IOOF Building", 47 Gawler Place, Adelaide

As a result of the demolition of 11-13 Flinders Street, the Grand Lodge of South Australia of the IOOF purchased 47 Gawler Place in the 1960s, and built a six storey office building with a basement and a caretaker's flat on the seventh level. The Grand Lodge's various businesses were located on the ground, first and fifth (top) floors (levels 1, 2 and 6), and the other space was let, providing the Grand Lodge with income.

The building was opened by SA Premier Sir Thomas Playford in 1963.

In 1975, the Whitlam government introduced Medicare (then named "Medibank"), and the roles of voluntary health insurance funds changed dramatically. As in Britain with the introduction of universal health insurance in the 1940s, voluntary health insurance fund membership dropped to a fraction of former numbers, and the friendly societies had to reduce the size of their businesses and concentrate on other forms of services for their members. As in Britain, these were generally investment services, insurance services, and provision of aged care facilities (colloquially known as "Old Folks Homes").

When the Grand Lodge of Victoria registered "IOOF" as its trading name, the Grand Lodge of South Australia changed its trading name to IOOF(SA).

Subsequently, with the increasing focus on investment services, on 29 May 2007, IOOF(SA) demutualized and changed its trading name to "KeyInvest".

=== 50th Anniversary ===
In 2013 the Grand Lodge and KeyInvest celebrated the 50th anniversary of the opening of the building. In recent years there have been many changes to the building. The lifts have been refurbished and now also serve the 7th level of the building. A Lodge meeting room has been constructed at the rear of the ground floor. (And less interesting, but no less expensive additions like toilets for the disabled, have been added.)

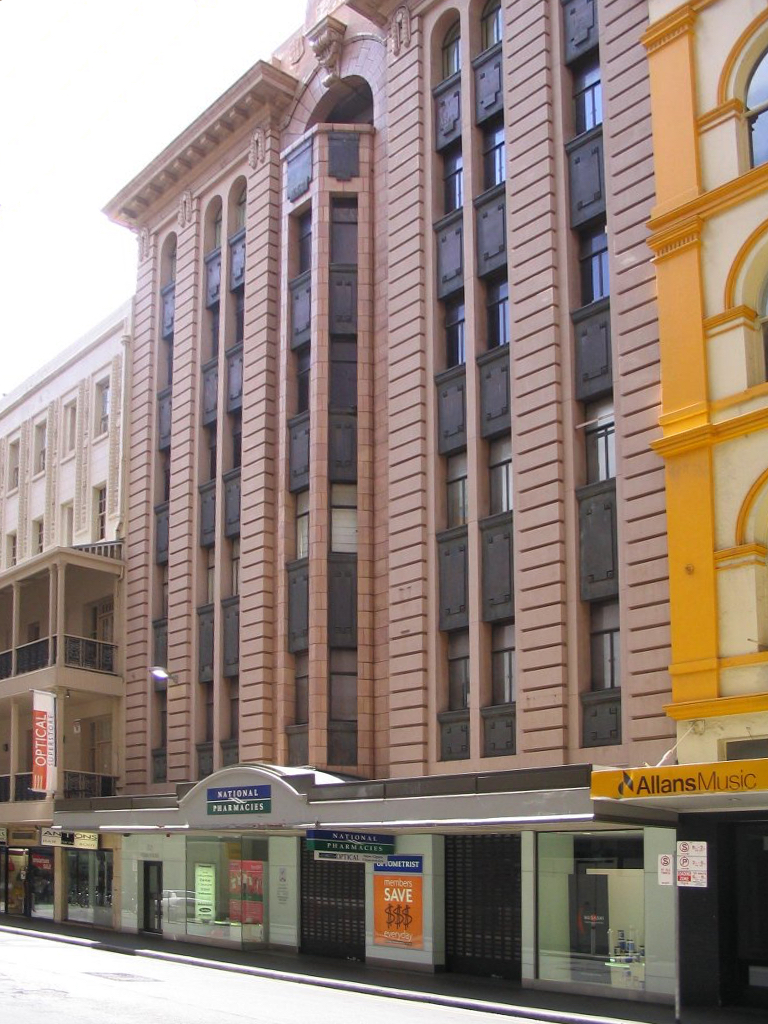
"Claridge House", the head office of the FSMA
