= IOOF Lodge (Thompson Falls, Montana) =

- U.S. National Register of Historic Places
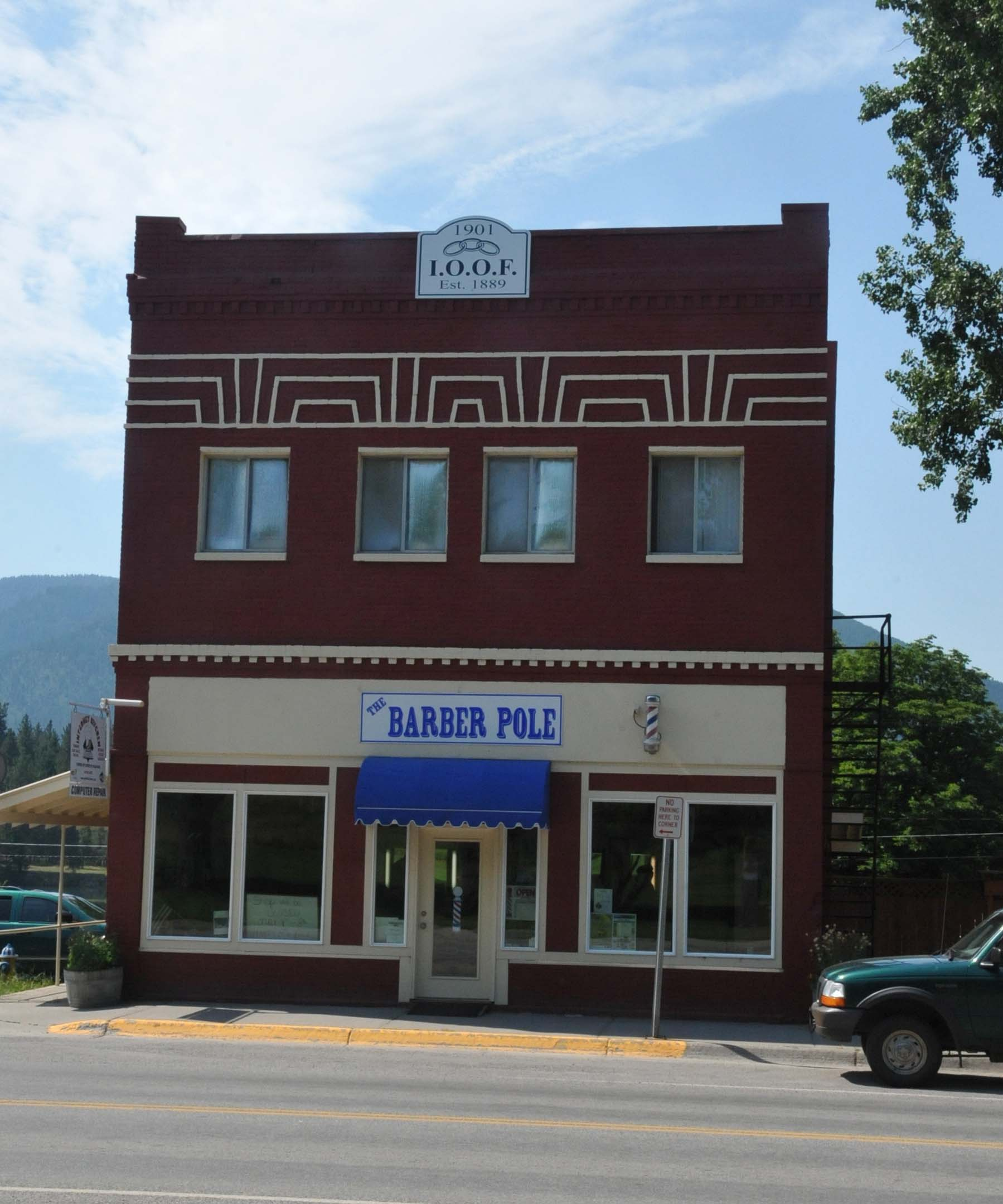
- IOOF Lodge in 2013

- Location within Montana Location within the United States
- Location: 520 Main St., Thompson Falls, Montana
- Coordinates: 47°35′35″N 115°20′31″W
- Area: less than one acre
- Built: 1901
- Architect: Owens, C.M.
- MPS: Thompson Falls MRA
- NRHP reference No.: 86002761
- Added to NRHP: October 7, 1986

The IOOF Lodge in Thompson Falls, Montana, United States, also known as Odd Fellows Hall, was built in 1901 and served historically as a clubhouse and as a meeting hall. It was listed on the National Register of Historic Places in 1986.

It was built for the Lone Star Lodge #33 of the International Order of Odd Fellows. The chapter was founded in 1889 with 27 original members and grew to over 100 members by 1901.

It is one of the oldest surviving masonry buildings in Thompson Falls, and it is significant for its association with the Odd Fellows and social and charitable activity.
