= Odd Fellows Building (Portland, Oregon) =

Historic building in Portland, Oregon, U.S.

- U.S. National Register of Historic Places
- Portland Historic Landmark
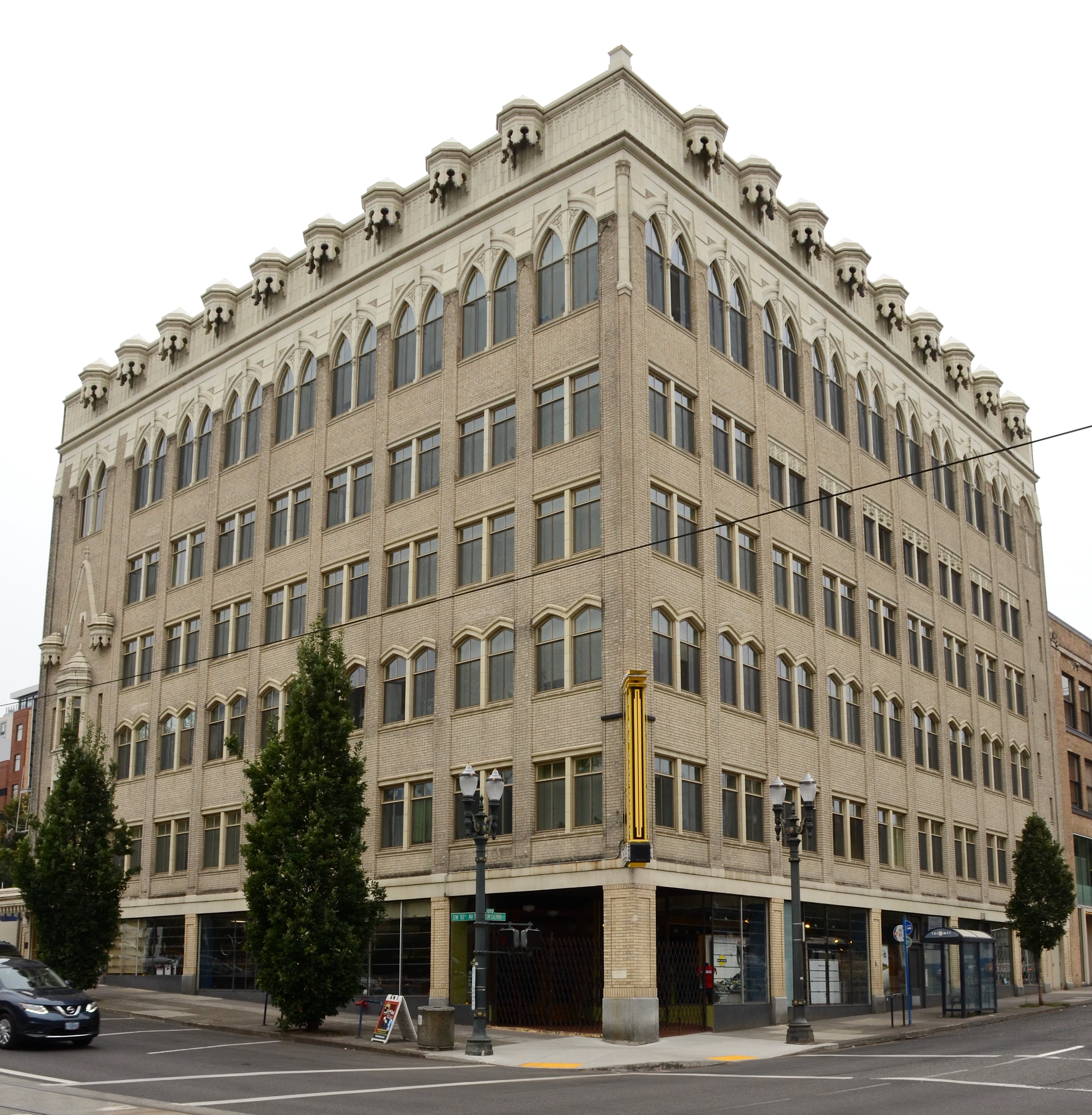
- Viewed from the northeast in 2017

- Location within Portland, Oregon Location within Oregon Location within the United States
- Location: 1019 SW 10th Avenue; Portland, Oregon
- Coordinates: 45°31′04″N 122°41′01″W
- Area: 0.3 acres (0.12 ha)
- Built: 1922–1924
- Architect: Ernst Kroner
- Architectural style: Late Gothic Revival
- NRHP reference No.: 80003372
- Added to NRHP: October 24, 1980

The Odd Fellows Building in downtown Portland, Oregon, was built in 1922–1924. It served historically as a clubhouse. It was listed on the National Register of Historic Places in 1980 for its architecture, which is Late Gothic Revival.

It is a six-story structure built of reinforced concrete, with a full concrete basement. It was deemed "significant to Portland as the singular example of Period architecture in the "Gothic" style, in which Tudor Gothic elements of terra cotta were applied to a skyscraper form. One of 75 building standing in the city today which were built between 1900 and 1930 & which incorporate structural terra cotta, the Odd Fellows Building is among the most distinctive of its type because of its unique stylistic theme and because of the prominent site it occupies in the midst of a bustling few blocks between the Portland Art Museum and the Central Library."

It was designed by German-born architect Ernst Kroner (1866–1955), who was notably active in politics in Portland from 1889 to 1897. Kroner also designed the Clatskanie IOOF Hall, which is also NRHP-listed.

== See also ==
- National Register of Historic Places listings in Southwest Portland, Oregon
