= Odd Fellows Temple (Pasadena, California) =

- U.S. National Register of Historic Places
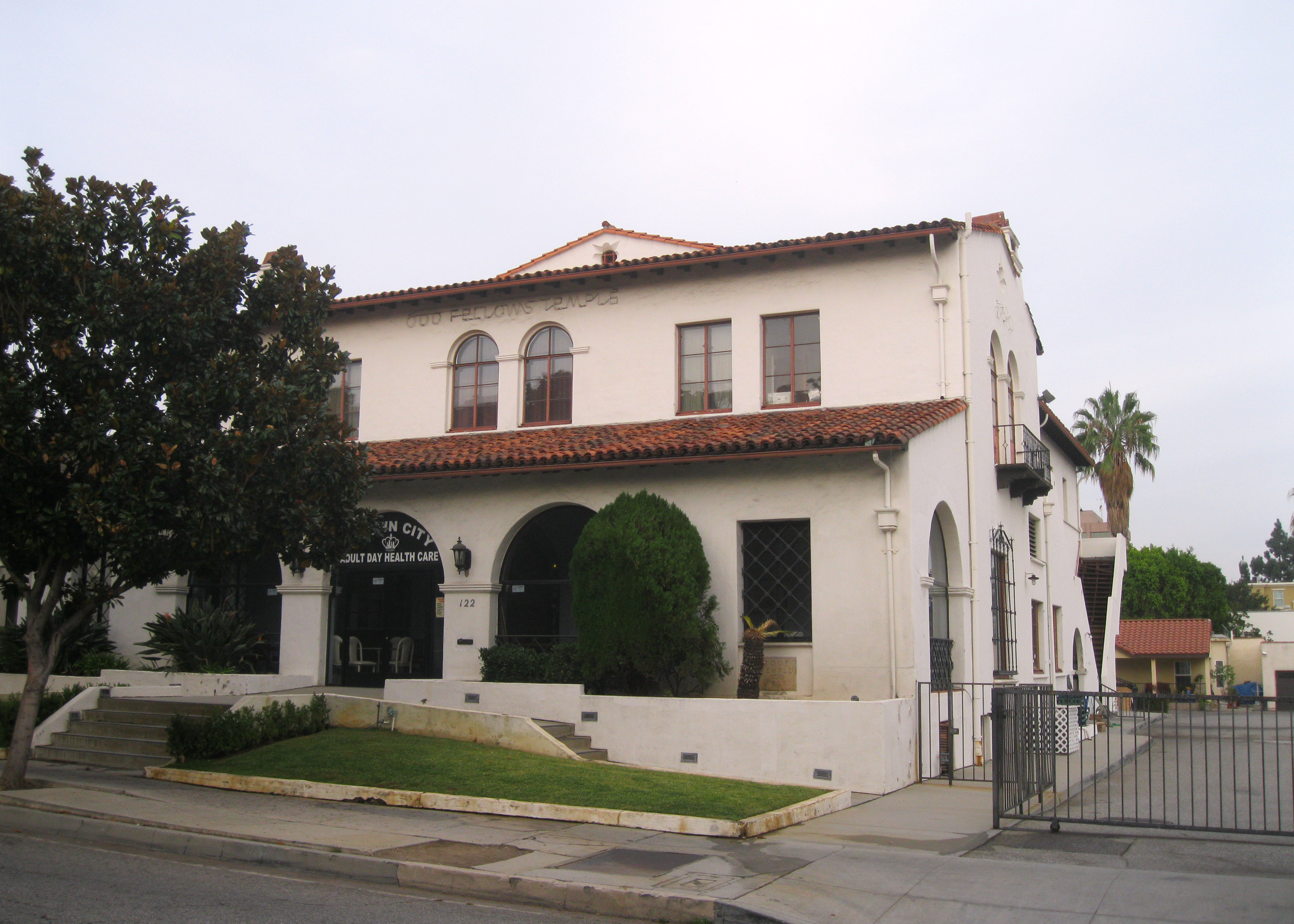

- Location within the Los Angeles metropolitan area Location within California Location within the United States
- Location: 120 N. El Molino Ave., Pasadena, California
- Coordinates: 34.148066°N 118.13656°W
- Area: 0.4 acres (0.16 ha)
- Built: 1933
- Architect: Gordon, Kenneth
- Architectural style: Spanish Colonial Revival
- NRHP reference No.: 85001682
- Added to NRHP: August 1, 1985

The Odd Fellows Temple in Pasadena, California is a historic building that was built in 1933 at 175 N. Los Robles Ave. The temple served as a meeting place for Odd Fellow Lodge No. 324, the Pasadena branch of the Independent Order of Odd Fellows established in 1885. Pasadena architect Kenneth Gordon designed the building; its design incorporates the Spanish Colonial Revival and Mediterranean Revival styles. The temple is the only Spanish Colonial Revival building in Pasadena which was built for a fraternal organization. It was listed on the National Register of Historic Places (NRHP) in 1985.

It is a large building but was nonetheless moved in 1987, after its NRHP listing, to 120 N. El Molino Avenue.
