= Odd Fellows Temple (Lexington, Kentucky) =

- U.S. National Register of Historic Places
- U.S. Historic district – Contributing property
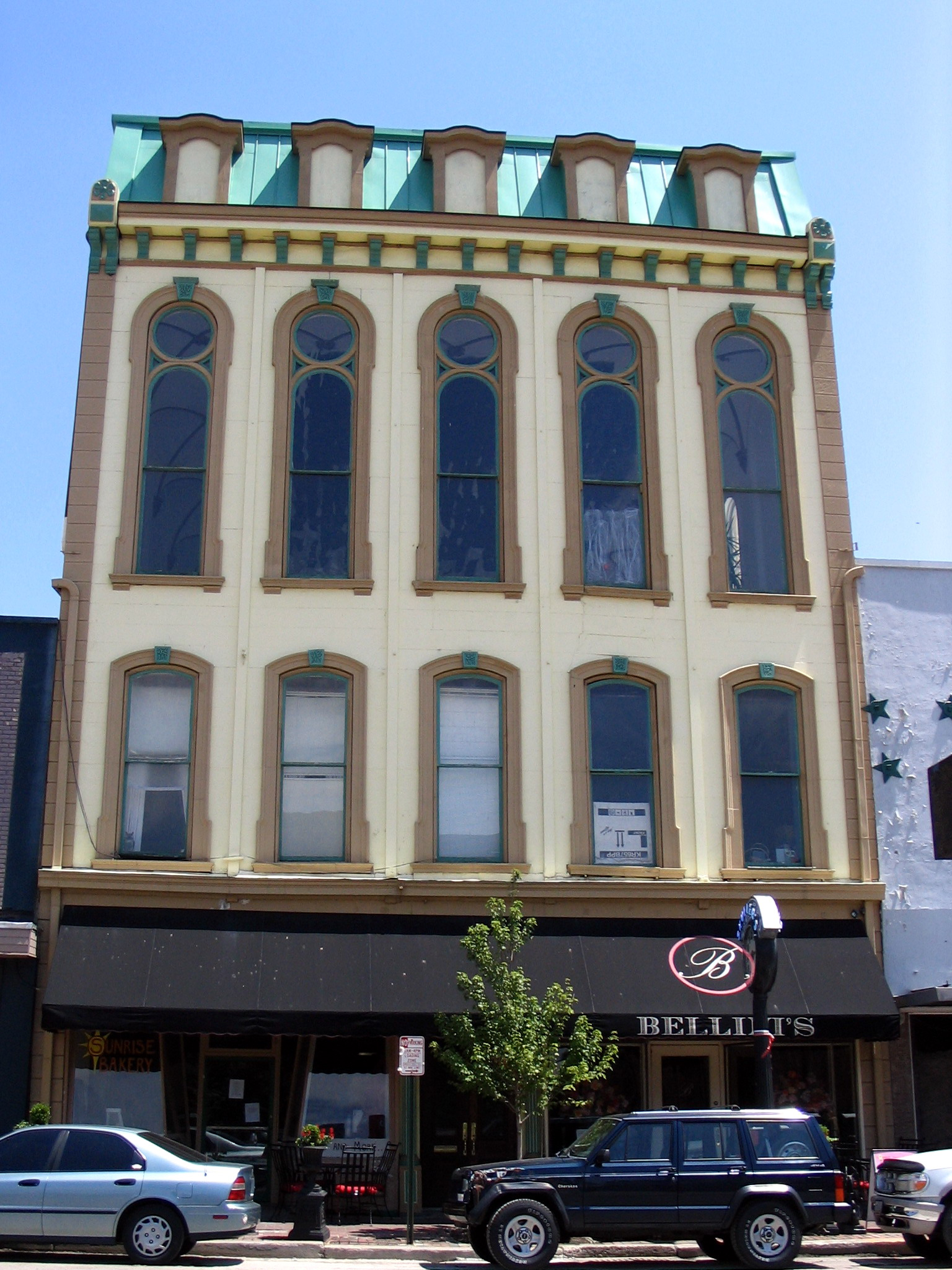
- Odd Fellows Temple, 1870

- Location within Kentucky Location within the United States
- Location: 115-119 W. Main St., Lexington, Kentucky
- Coordinates: 38°2′48″N 84°29′52″W
- Area: less than one acre
- Built: 1869-70
- Architect: Cincinnatus Shryock
- Architectural style: Italianate, Second Empire
- Part of: Downtown Commercial District (ID83000559)
- NRHP reference No.: 80001520

Significant dates
- Added to NRHP: February 27, 1980
- Designated CP: August 25, 1983

The Odd Fellows Temple in Lexington, Kentucky, also known as Skullers Jewelry, Inc., was built in Second Empire and Italianate style between 1869 and 1870. It was listed on the National Register of Historic Places in 1980.

It is a 41 feet (12 m) by 97 feet (30 m) building that is primarily Italianate in style, but has a Second Empire-styled top floor.

The listing includes "Skuller's Clock", a two-faced clock on an iron column about 10 feet (3.0 m) in front of the store.
