= IOOF Lodge (Alton, Kansas) =

- Formerly listed on the U.S. National Register of Historic Places
- Location within Kansas Location within the United States
- Location: Jct. of Nicholas and Mill Sts., Alton, Kansas
- Coordinates: 39°27′21″N 98°56′53″W
- Area: less than one acre
- Built: 1885
- NRHP reference No.: 02000491

Significant dates
- Added to NRHP: May 16, 2002
- Removed from NRHP: February 24, 2012

The IOOF Lodge in Alton, Kansas was built in 1885. It served historically as a business and as a meeting hall. It was listed on the National Register of Historic Places in 2002.
