= Odd Fellows Building (Owensboro, Kentucky) =

- U.S. National Register of Historic Places
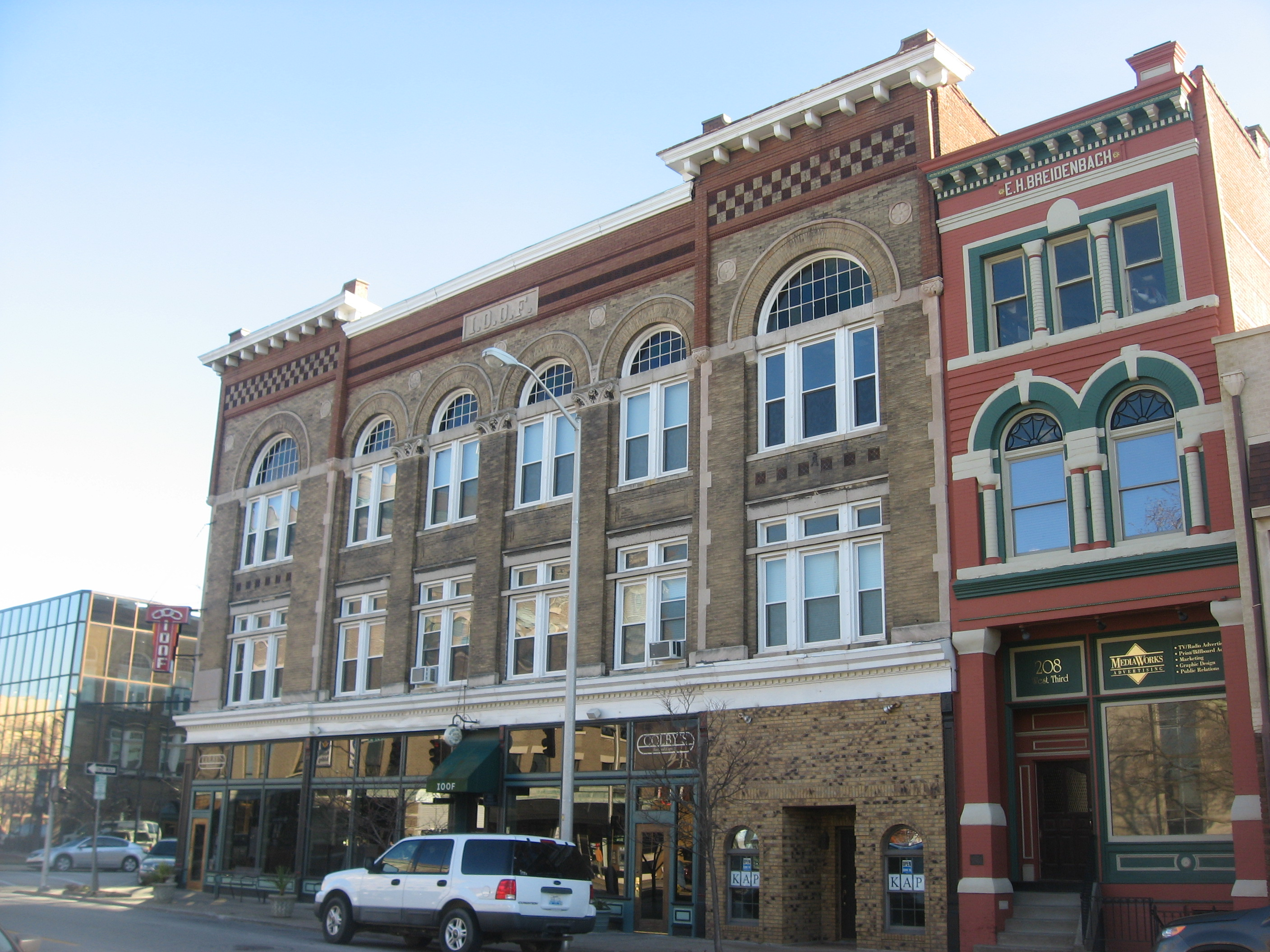
- Southern front of the building, along with the Breidenbach Building on the right edge

- Location within Kentucky Location within the United States
- Location: 200-204 W. Third St., Owensboro, Kentucky
- Coordinates: 37°46′24″N 87°6′44″W
- Area: 0.1 acres (0.040 ha)
- Built: 1895
- Architectural style: Beaux Arts, Renaissance Revival, and Italian Renaissance Revival
- MPS: Owensboro MRA
- NRHP reference No.: 86000758
- Added to NRHP: March 28, 1986

The Odd Fellows Building in Owensboro, Kentucky, also denoted DAOB 86, is a three-story building that was built in 1895. It served historically as a professional building, as a clubhouse, and as a specialty store. It is listed on the National Register of Historic Places.

It is one of the most complex buildings, architecturally, in downtown Owensboro, and includes eclectic Beaux Arts and Italian Renaissance Revival details.

The Odd Fellows chapter had membership of 125 men in 1895 when this building, with third floor lodge space for the chapter, was built. The rest of the building has always been commercial, with the first floor as retail space and the second floor as office space.

It was listed onto the National Register in 1986 along with multiple other historic resources in Owensboro, as result of a multiple resources study.
