= Odd Fellows Building (Pikeville, Kentucky) =

- U.S. National Register of Historic Places
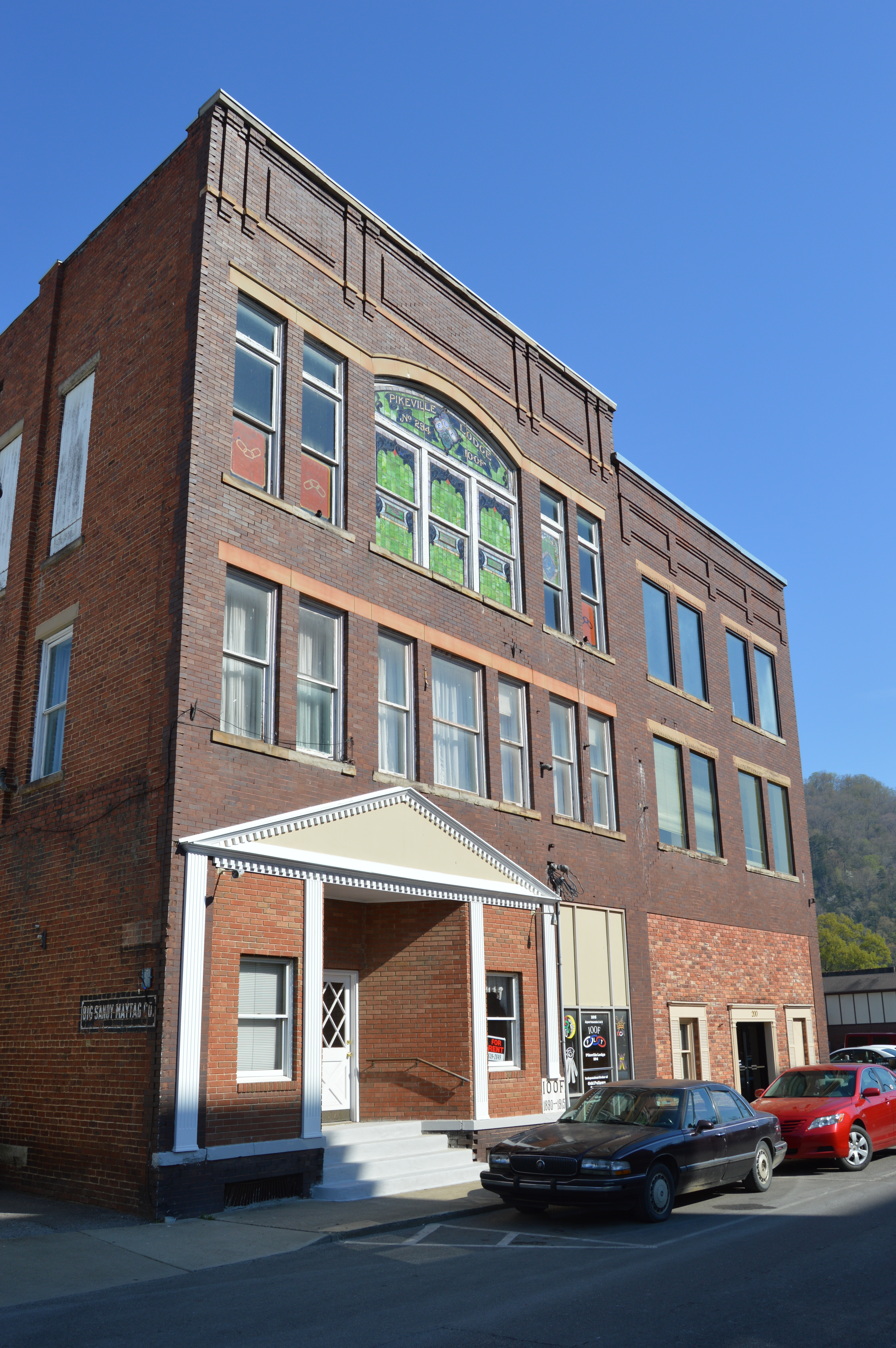

- Location within Kentucky Location within the United States
- Location: 333 2nd St., Pikeville, Kentucky
- Coordinates: 37°28′50″N 82°31′6″W
- Area: 0.2 acres (0.081 ha)
- Built: 1915
- MPS: Pikeville MRA
- NRHP reference No.: 84001929
- Added to NRHP: April 26, 1984

The Odd Fellows Building in Pikeville, Kentucky is a three-story brick building that was built in 1915 and historically served as a warehouse and as a business. It was listed on the National Register of Historic Places in 1984.

It has glazed brick on its front facade, on 2nd Street. It has stone sills and stone lintels in the windows and it has a stained glass window.

It was deemed significant as one of two surviving brick warehouse buildings in Pikeville's commercial district. Part of the building has been used in a grocery wholesale business.

It was one subject of a study of historic resources in Pikeville that led to multiple listings on the National Register in 1984.
