= Odd Fellows Building (Raleigh, North Carolina) =

Historic building in North Carolina, US

- U.S. National Register of Historic Places
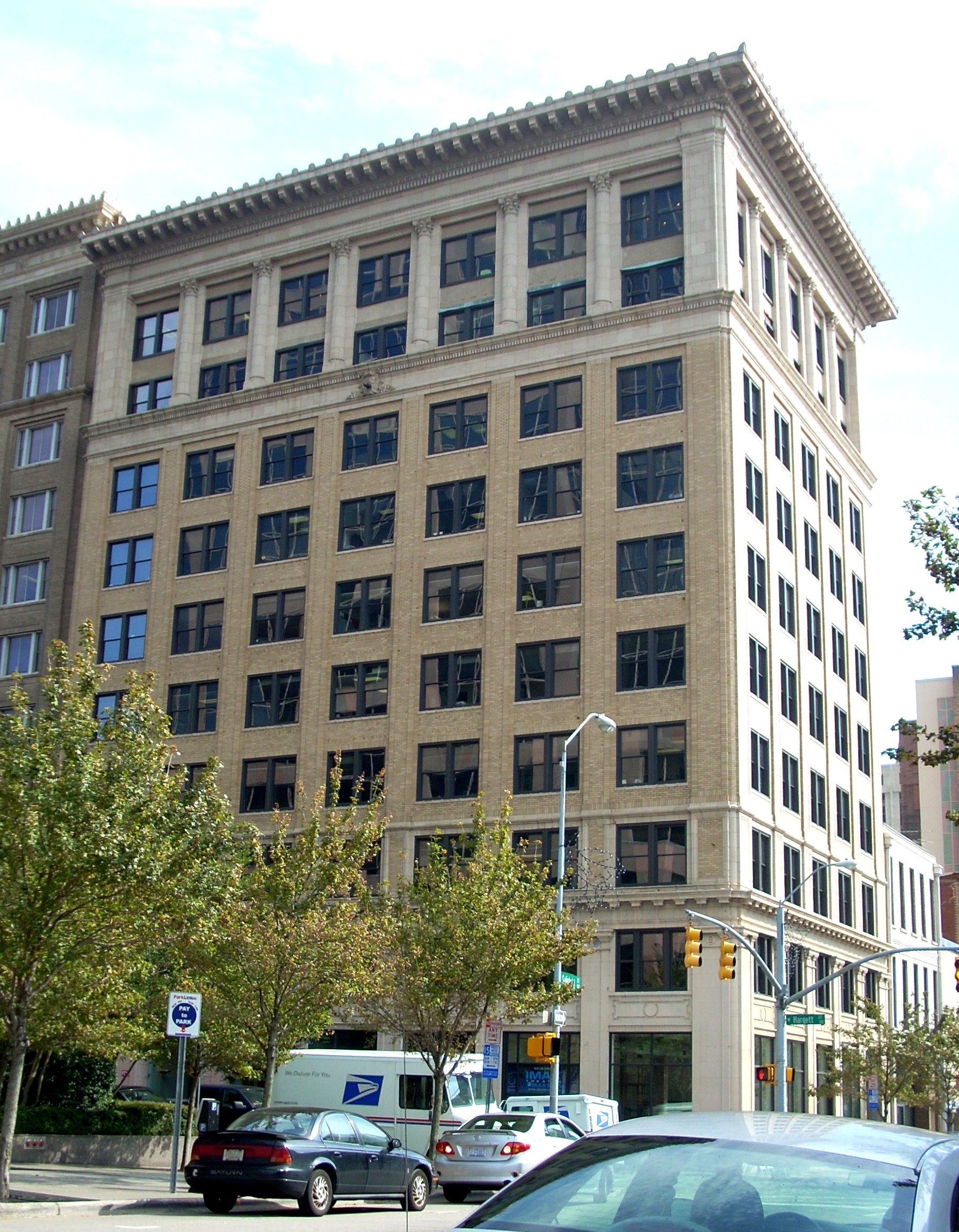
- Odd Fellows Building in Raleigh

- Location within North Carolina Location within the United States
- Location: 19 W Hargett St., Raleigh, North Carolina
- Coordinates: 35°46′40″N 78°38′24″W
- Area: 0.2 acres (0.081 ha)
- Built: 1923
- Architect: Preacher, G. Lloyd and Co.; Beaman Construction Co.
- Architectural style: Late 19th and Early 20th Century American Movements, Skyscraper, Classical Revival
- Part of: Fayetteville Street Historic District (ID07001412)
- NRHP reference No.: 97001498
- Added to NRHP: December 1, 1997

The Odd Fellows Building in Raleigh, North Carolina, also known as the Commerce Building, is a 10-story skyscraper built in 1923. It reflects Late 19th and Early 20th Century American Movements architecture and Classical Revival architecture and consists of the classic base-shaft-capital design. The Odd Fellows (IOOF) Building served as a meeting hall for the Independent Order of Odd Fellows and as a business.

It was listed on the National Register of Historic Places in 1997.

== See also ==
- Commerce Building (disambiguation)
- Independent Order of Odd Fellows - IOOF
