= Goodwin, South Dakota =

- Town
- Location in Deuel County and the state of South Dakota
- Coordinates: 44°52′39″N 96°50′59″W
- Country: United States
- State: South Dakota
- County: Deuel

Area
  - Total: 0.47 sq mi (1.23 km^{2})
  - Land: 0.47 sq mi (1.23 km^{2})
  - Water: 0 sq mi (0.00 km^{2})
- Elevation: 1,998 ft (609 m)

Population (2020)
  - Total: 147
  - Density: 310.0/sq mi (119.68/km^{2})
- Time zone: UTC-6 (Central (CST))
  - Summer (DST): UTC-5 (CDT)
- ZIP code: 57238
- Area code: 605
- FIPS code: 46-24820
- GNIS feature ID: 1267406

Goodwin is a town in Deuel County, South Dakota, United States, where the population was 147 at the 2020 census.

== History ==
Goodwin was platted in 1878, when the railroad was built into the area. The town was named for George P. Goodwin, a railroad official. A post office has been in operation in Goodwin since 1878. It is still running today. On May 30, 2022, the town was struck by a tornado that would damage many homes and businesses and would be rated EF3.

== Geography ==
According to the United States Census Bureau, the town has a total land area of 0.47 square miles (1.22 km^{2}), all land.

== Demographics ==
Historical population
Census	Pop.	Note	%±
1910	145		—
1920	157		8.3%
1930	140		−10.8%
1940	152		8.6%
1950	141		−7.2%
1960	113		−19.9%
1970	114		0.9%
1980	139		21.9%
1990	126		−9.4%
2000	160		27.0%
2010	146		−8.7%
2020	147		0.7%
U.S. Decennial Census

=== 2010 census ===
As of the census of 2010, there were 146 people, 59 households, and 37 families residing in the town. The population density was 310.6 inhabitants per square mile (119.9/km^{2}). There were 62 housing units at an average density of 131.9 per square mile (50.9/km^{2}). The racial makeup of the town was 88.4% White, 9.6% from other races, and 2.1% from two or more races. Hispanic or Latino of any race were 10.3% of the population.

There were 59 households, of which 33.9% had children under the age of 18 living with them, 47.5% were married couples living together, 10.2% had a female householder with no husband present, 5.1% had a male householder with no wife present, and 37.3% were non-families. 30.5% of all households were made up of individuals, and 5.1% had someone living alone who was 65 years of age or older. The average household size was 2.47 and the average family size was 3.16.

The median age in the town was 40 years. 27.4% of residents were under the age of 18; 10.3% were between the ages of 18 and 24; 19.8% were from 25 to 44; 31.5% were from 45 to 64; and 11% were 65 years of age or older. The gender makeup of the town was 51.4% male and 48.6% female.

=== 2000 census ===
As of the census of 2000, there were 160 people, 61 households, and 38 families residing in the town. The population density was 337.4 inhabitants per square mile (130.3/km^{2}). There were 63 housing units at an average density of 132.8 per square mile (51.3/km^{2}). The racial makeup of the town was 95.00% White, 3.12% from other races, and 1.88% from two or more races. Hispanic or Latino of any race were 3.12% of the population.

There were 61 households, out of which 34.4% had children under the age of 18 living with them, 45.9% were married couples living together, 6.6% had a female householder with no husband present, and 36.1% were non-families. 29.5% of all households were made up of individuals, and 11.5% had someone living alone who was 65 years of age or older. The average household size was 2.62 and the average family size was 3.28.

In the town, the population was spread out, with 27.5% under the age of 18, 10.6% from 18 to 24, 28.8% from 25 to 44, 20.0% from 45 to 64, and 13.1% who were 65 years of age or older. The median age was 34 years. For every 100 females, there were 119.2 males. For every 100 females age 18 and over, there were 110.9 males.

The median income for a household in the town was $34,688, and the median income for a family was $36,875. Males had a median income of $20,250 versus $22,500 for females. The per capita income for the town was $14,249. None of the families and 9.4% of the population were living below the poverty line, including no under eighteens and 18.2% of those over 64.
