= Gary, South Dakota =

- City
- Motto: "Gate City To The Dakotas"
- Location in Deuel County and the state of South Dakota
- Coordinates: 44°47′39″N 96°27′27″W
- Country: United States
- State: South Dakota
- County: Deuel
- Incorporated: 1917

Area
  - Total: 0.75 sq mi (1.94 km^{2})
  - Land: 0.75 sq mi (1.94 km^{2})
  - Water: 0 sq mi (0.00 km^{2})
- Elevation: 1,437 ft (438 m)

Population (2020)
  - Total: 240
  - Density: 320.9/sq mi (123.89/km^{2})
- Time zone: UTC-6 (Central (CST))
  - Summer (DST): UTC-5 (CDT)
- ZIP code: 57237
- Area code: 605
- FIPS code: 46-23860
- GNIS feature ID: 1267401
- Website: garysd.com

Gary is a city in Deuel County, South Dakota, United States. The population was 240 at the 2020 census. South Dakota Highway 101 serves as the main route of the community. In 2022, the town celebrated its 150th anniversary.

== History ==
A post office called Gary was established in 1874. Gary was platted by the railroad in 1877. It was named for H. B. Gary, a postal official. An early variant name was State Line.

== Geography ==
According to the United States Census Bureau, the city has a total area of 0.69 square miles (1.79 km^{2}), all land. The West Branch of the Lac qui Parle River flows through the city as a spring fed stream near its headwaters.

== Demographics ==
Historical population
Census	Pop.	Note	%±
1890	277		—
1900	345		24.5%
1910	477		38.3%
1920	588		23.3%
1930	543		−7.7%
1940	566		4.2%
1950	558		−1.4%
1960	471		−15.6%
1970	366		−22.3%
1980	354		−3.3%
1990	274		−22.6%
2000	231		−15.7%
2010	227		−1.7%
2020	240		5.7%
U.S. Decennial Census

=== 2020 census ===
As of the 2020 census, Gary had a population of 240. The median age was 54.5 years. 19.6% of residents were under the age of 18 and 33.8% of residents were 65 years of age or older. For every 100 females there were 112.4 males, and for every 100 females age 18 and over there were 112.1 males age 18 and over.

0.0% of residents lived in urban areas, while 100.0% lived in rural areas.

There were 120 households in Gary, of which 15.8% had children under the age of 18 living in them. Of all households, 31.7% were married-couple households, 34.2% were households with a male householder and no spouse or partner present, and 25.8% were households with a female householder and no spouse or partner present. About 52.5% of all households were made up of individuals and 29.2% had someone living alone who was 65 years of age or older.

There were 152 housing units, of which 21.1% were vacant. The homeowner vacancy rate was 2.3% and the rental vacancy rate was 12.8%.

Racial composition as of the 2020 census
Race	Number	Percent
White	224	93.3%
Black or African American	0	0.0%
American Indian and Alaska Native	4	1.7%
Asian	2	0.8%
Native Hawaiian and Other Pacific Islander	2	0.8%
Some other race	4	1.7%
Two or more races	4	1.7%
Hispanic or Latino (of any race)	5	2.1%

=== 2010 census ===
As of the census of 2010, there were 227 people, 120 households, and 61 families residing in the city. The population density was 329.0 inhabitants per square mile (127.0/km^{2}). There were 153 housing units at an average density of 221.7 per square mile (85.6/km^{2}). The racial makeup of the city was 96.9% White, 0.9% African American, 1.8% Native American, and 0.4% from two or more races. Hispanic or Latino of any race were 1.3% of the population.

There were 120 households, of which 17.5% had children under the age of 18 living with them, 42.5% were married couples living together, 6.7% had a female householder with no husband present, 1.7% had a male householder with no wife present, and 49.2% were non-families. 47.5% of all households were made up of individuals, and 23.3% had someone living alone who was 65 years of age or older. The average household size was 1.89 and the average family size was 2.67.

The median age in the city was 51.6 years. 18.1% of residents were under the age of 18; 5.3% were between the ages of 18 and 24; 17.9% were from 25 to 44; 32.6% were from 45 to 64; and 26% were 65 years of age or older. The gender makeup of the city was 51.5% male and 48.5% female.

=== 2000 census ===
As of the census of 2000, there were 231 people, 128 households, and 62 families residing in the city. The population density was 334.5 inhabitants per square mile (129.2/km^{2}). There were 148 housing units at an average density of 214.3 per square mile (82.7/km^{2}). The racial makeup of the city was 99.57% White and 0.43% Native American.

There were 128 households, out of which 16.4% had children under the age of 18 living with them, 43.0% were married couples living together, 4.7% had a female householder with no husband present, and 50.8% were non-families. 50.0% of all households were made up of individuals, and 31.3% had someone living alone who was 65 years of age or older. The average household size was 1.80 and the average family size was 2.62.

In the city, the population was spread out, with 16.5% under the age of 18, 3.5% from 18 to 24, 21.6% from 25 to 44, 26.0% from 45 to 64, and 32.5% who were 65 years of age or older. The median age was 52 years. For every 100 females, there were 90.9 males. For every 100 females age 18 and over, there were 89.2 males.

The median income for a household in the city was $20,962, and the median income for a family was $31,250. Males had a median income of $19,500 versus $16,563 for females. The per capita income for the city was $13,480. About 12.9% of families and 13.9% of the population were below the poverty line, including 14.6% of those under the age of eighteen and 24.3% of those 65 or over.
