= James K. Polk (song) =

Single by They Might Be Giants

from the album Factory Showroom
- A-side: "Istanbul (Not Constantinople)"
- Released: May 14, 1990; October 8, 1996 (Factory Showroom re-recording)
- Genre: Alternative rock
- Length: 3:04; 3:19 (original version)
- Label: Elektra
- Composers: John Flansburgh; John Linnell
- Lyricists: John Flansburgh; Matthew Hill; John Linnell
- Producer: They Might Be Giants

"James K. Polk" is a song by American alternative rock band They Might Be Giants. It is about the United States president of the same name. Originally released in 1990 as a B-side to the single "Istanbul (Not Constantinople)", its first appearance on a studio album was 1996's Factory Showroom. It also appeared on their compilation albums Dial-A-Song: 20 Years of They Might Be Giants and A User's Guide to They Might Be Giants. The song is about James K. Polk, the 11th President of the United States, beginning with a description of the 1844 Democratic National Convention and going on to cover some of the highlights of Polk's presidency. Although the band set out to write a song consisting entirely of historical facts, it includes a few errors or misstatements.

The Factory Showroom re-recording of "James K. Polk" includes an interlude featuring Julian Koster playing a musical saw. The song has become a fan favorite and is frequently played live, although the band has expressed antipathy towards Polk himself; John Flansburgh has described him as "evil".

== Composition ==
According to John Flansburgh, John Linnell wrote "James K. Polk" with Matthew Hill, a childhood friend of theirs and a history buff. The concept for the song came from a conversation the two had about writing a song that was based entirely in fact, in the vein of "The Battle of New Orleans". Linnell and Hill were specifically drawn to James K. Polk due to his relative obscurity despite his tremendous influence during his presidency. They proceeded to write the song despite personal disagreement with Polk's policies as president. Flansburgh speculated that if they had included their opinion that Polk was "evil", it would have defeated the purpose of writing a song of pure fact.

Prior to writing the song, Linnell and Hill were not familiar with Polk's presidency; they chose Polk at random from a list of presidents. Only after researching Polk did they discover that he was, according to Linnell, "really intense and kind of...creepy".

In a review of the "Istanbul (Not Constantinople)" single, which had "James K. Polk" as its B-side, Christian Huey called the song's main instrumentation a "plodding synth line". He also compared the bridge's melodic non-lexical vocables to those in "Istanbul". The Factory Showroom recording features Julian Koster of Neutral Milk Hotel playing a musical saw. Linnell and Flansburgh call the effect of the saw "spooky".

== Lyrics ==
The song does not present a comprehensive biography of James K. Polk. Instead, it begins at the 1844 Democratic National Convention. Deadlocked among Martin Van Buren, James Buchanan, and Lewis Cass, the party eventually chose Polk as its nominee. The song describes his personality and what led him to ultimately be the victor in the general election and describes Polk's accomplishments as president, such as acquiring part of the Oregon Territory and leading the country to victory in the Mexican–American War.

"James K. Polk" contains two main errors or misstatements in its lyrics. The first verse describes Van Buren as an abolitionist. While Van Buren later joined the Free Soil Party, which opposed the expansion of slavery in the United States, he did not advocate for its abolition entirely. Secondly, the song says that Polk "made the English sell the Oregon Territory" during his presidency. In fact, the US had claimed part of what was then called Oregon Country prior to Polk's administration. Polk did sign the Oregon Treaty with the United Kingdom in 1846, which delineated American and British claims in the Pacific Northwest. Only after this treaty was the Oregon Territory established.

== Reception ==
Although Factory Showroom received a lukewarm response from critics, "James K. Polk" has been generally well regarded. In a review of the song for AllMusic, Stewart Mason praised the song for both its melody and its lyrics, which, despite being "practically paragraphs", "scan perfectly well". Though Mason favors the original 1990 arrangement over the 1996 recording, he calls the tune a "fan favorite". A People review of Factory Showroom labels the song "Beatles-esque".

Despite the praise the song has received, in a review of Factory Showroom, Stephen Thomas Erlewine of AllMusic disapproved of the band's "recycling" old material for the album. To Erlewine, this signified their "creative block" during the period. Regardless, the song is designated as an "AllMusic pick" from the album.

== Legacy ==
"James K. Polk" has been cited as an example of the band's unconventional subjects for pop lyrics. Some critics have seen a connection between the song's educational lyrics and the band's later success in the mid- to late-2000s: composing children's music. Mason compares the song to Schoolhouse Rock! educational television program; however, the song is also popular among the band's adult fans, and it often features in their live setlists.

== Personnel ==
=== 1990 recording ===
They Might Be Giants

- John Flansburgh – synthesizers
- John Linnell – vocals, synthesizers

Production

- They Might Be Giants – producer
- Roger Moutenot – engineering, mixing
- Paul Angelli – engineering

=== 1996 recording ===
They Might Be Giants

- John Flansburgh – acoustic guitar
- John Linnell – vocals, accordion

Additional musicians

- Brian Doherty – drums
- Julian Koster – singing saw
- Graham Maby – bass
- Eric Schermerhorn – electric guitar

Production

- They Might Be Giants and Patrick Dillett – producers
