= Kajitani =

Kajitani (written: 梶谷) is a Japanese surname. Notable people with the surname include:

- Alex Kajitani, American educator
- Nobuyuki Kajitani (梶谷 信之, born 1955), Japanese gymnast
- Takayuki Kajitani (梶谷 隆幸, born 1988), Japanese baseball player
- Naomi Kajitani (梶谷 直美, born 1967), Japanese famous Actress
