= Educational music =

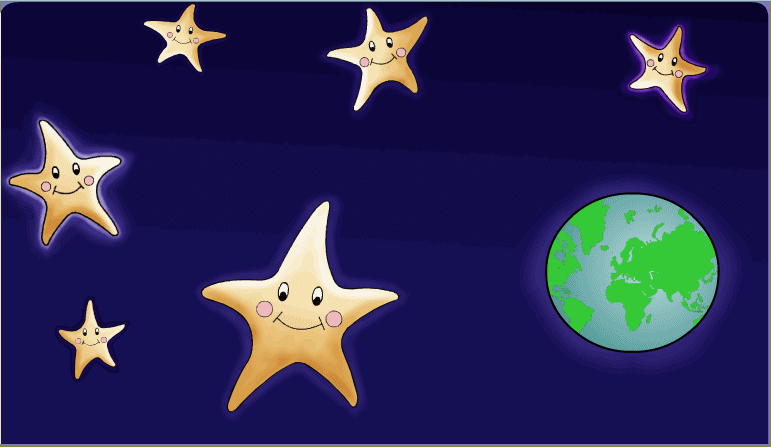
Twinkle Twinkle Little Star, lullaby from the European Union government funded, education project Lullabies of Europe: Languages from the Cradle

Educational music is a genre of music in which songs, lyrics, or other musical elements are used as a method of teaching and/or learning. It has been shown in research to promote learning. Additionally, music study in general has been shown to improve academic performance of students.

Music used for learning can be in many formats, including video recordings, audio recordings, sheet music, and improvised music. Most of the time, music is added to an existing lesson plan or story. Songs are usually easy to sing and catchy, so that they can be repeated for later learning. Some children's music is considered educational, and, historically, most educational music is geared towards children. Prominent examples include songs from LazyTown, Sesame Street, Schoolhouse Rock, Smart Songs' educational rap videos on YouTube, and Tom Lehrer's songs for the PBS show The Electric Company. Some educational songs also have become popular hits such as "Low Bridge (Fifteen Years/Miles On The Erie Canal)" and "The Battle Of New Orleans".

Recent developments have extended music's use to secondary and collegiate education, with Cornel West breaking new ground in this regard.

== Forms ==
=== Video ===
Video recordings are the most use of educational music. Television shows, DVDs, and even some movies use music to teach the viewer, whether it be a moral lesson or a scholastic lesson. Sesame Street and Schoolhouse Rock are examples of shows that use music to teach topics like math, science, and government. Things like counting, the names of the planets, or the law making process are put to music with simple lyrics to aid in retention of information. In the minds of many elementary children a video can break the monotony of the school day, and will likely get them more interested in the content they are learning. Music can be used in this same capacity throughout the day and allow for the teacher to give the students a mental break while still having them learn. With both of these being effective ways for a teacher to help their students learn new material in a new and exciting way, music videos can be very impactful on the brains of elementary school children.

Shows such as Little Einsteins use music as a story aid to teach decision-making and music recognition. Instrumental music represents different objects, people, animals, or actions to help the viewer distinguish between various options.

Shows such as VeggieTales use a story as well as music to teach biblical and moral lessons to its viewers. This form uses songs to tie the story together and help the viewer remember important aspects of the story.

=== Audio ===
Audio music recordings are also used prominently as a form of education. The website Songs for Teaching has many songs for teachers to use to help kids learn. Baby Genius is a very popular company that produces educational music CDs for children. The European Union funded an education project to encourage early language learning called Lullabies of Europe that gathered and recorded lullabies in 7 European languages. Some Television shows and DVD series also make Audio recordings of their songs to further learning.

- Sheet Music is sometimes used to aid in teaching when a song is new and the student can read music. Sheet music is usually used in conjunction with a CD or instrumentation.

=== Improvised ===
Improvisation is used in educational music in a few settings. Teachers might make up a song for times tables and teach it to the students, perhaps having students add parts. Some people also make up songs to remember things or to study for a test.

=== Hip hop ===
Hip hop demonstrates increasing relevance and success as a pedagogical tool in primary and secondary education. Flocabulary and Defined Mind, focusing primarily on vocabulary building for SAT and ACT tests, have established a Web presence in addition to their textbooks. Smart Songs, concentrating on middle school, offers amusing and pertinent music video. MC SKULE (Rohen Shah) of the non-profit SKULE.org makes parody music videos of popular songs where the lyrics teach math. Alex Kajitani, the 2009 California State Teacher of the Year, created original middle school math songs as the Rappin' Mathematician.

== Programs that integrate music with education ==
=== Changing Education Through the Arts (CETA) ===
Some schools integrate music with other subjects in the hope that the music and the other subjects enhance each other. With this mutual growth, educators hope to improve the overall quality and experiences of education.

One program that integrates music in education is the Changing Education Through the Arts (CETA) program, which is done through the Kennedy Center. CETA is a partnership between the Kennedy Center and eight arts focus schools in the Washington D.C. area. They work together to produce staff that can integrate the arts across the curriculum. CETA aims to integrate music and other arts, such as dance and visual arts, into other scholastic areas, such as math and science "...to teach and assess objectives in both the art form and the other subject area. This allows a simultaneous focus on creating, performing, and/or responding to the arts while still addressing content in other subject areas."

The objectives of CETA are to:

1. Develop the knowledge, skills, and beliefs in the arts among individual teachers so they can integrate the arts across the curriculum to enhance student learning
2. Purposefully network these individuals in their own schools and with teachers in participating schools to develop their understanding and confidence in integrating the arts across the curriculum
3. Provide an extensive system of internal and external support and resources to the teachers, schools, and the network
4. Share knowledge and experiences with other educators and arts organizations both locally and nationally

=== Arts Horizons ===
Arts Horizons is an arts in education organization that serves schools in New York and New Jersey. They integrate music, as well as other arts, into learning to help children gain appreciation for the arts as well as stimulate children "through the arts to improve their proficiency in reading, writing and math."

Arts Horizons has a variety of programs, including:

- Interactive live performances by professional artists from Broadway, Lincoln Center and around the world
- Artist in residence programs, custom-designed for your school, that make connections between the arts and the classroom curriculum
- Three Professional development inspires teachers to introduce innovative, creative approaches in the classroom and implement state learning standards.

An example of an assembly provided by Arts Horizons is the Peter and the Wolf program. In this program, an actor tells the tale of Peter and the Wolf while a woodwind quintet plays the music of Prokofiev to bring the story to life. After the story, students have a chance to learn about the woodwind instruments that were used in the story, as well as other woodwind instruments, and hear other folk tales.

== Effects of music on education ==
CETA has concrete evidence on the following:

- Rising student test scores on the state exams. For example, Fort Hunt Elementary progressed from "not being accredited" to being "provisionally accredited" to being "fully accredited" within the course of three years.
- Fewer student disciplinary referrals to the office.
- Higher attendance rates.
- Anecdotes by teachers about student learning in the arts.

There have been many studies on the use of music to aid in teaching, as well as how an individual who plays music fares in their education. Results show that using music when teaching children to read, for example, can help children learn how to read and give lasting results. A study on elementary students even showed that students with music training have overall better verbal memory, compared to the memory of those students of the same demographic without music training.
