= Factory Showroom =

Studio album by They Might Be Giants
- Released: October 8, 1996
- Recorded: October 1995 ("New York City"); April–August 1996
- Studios: River Sound (New York City); The Hit Factory (New York City); Sound on Sound (Montclair, New Jersey); Clinton (New York City); Coyote (New York City); The Edison Laboratory (West Orange, New Jersey)
- Genre: Alternative rock
- Length: 42:38
- Label: Elektra
- Producers: Pat Dillett, They Might Be Giants

They Might Be Giants chronology
John Henry (1994)	Factory Showroom (1996)	Then: The Earlier Years (1997)

Singles from Factory Showroom
- 1. "S-E-X-X-Y" Released: November 26, 1996

Professional ratings
Review scores
Source	Rating
AllMusic	2/5 stars
Alternative Press	3/5 stars
Chicago Tribune	3/4 stars
Christgau's Consumer Guide	(3-star Honorable Mention)
Pitchfork	7.4/10
The Rolling Stone Album Guide	2.5/5 stars

Factory Showroom is the sixth studio album by American alternative rock band They Might Be Giants, released in 1996 with Elektra Records. It was the band's first album to be produced by Pat Dillett, who would go on to work with the band on all subsequent albums, as well as their first album to feature a second guitarist, Eric Schermerhorn.

Two years after Factory Showroom's release, John Flansburgh cited the album as his favorite by the duo. Feeling that Elektra did not do enough to promote the album, among other disputes, They Might Be Giants left the label after its release.

== Song notes ==
"I Can Hear You" was recorded at the Edison Laboratory on a wax cylinder phonograph without the use of electricity, on April 27, 1996.

== Track listing ==
All tracks are written by They Might Be Giants, except where noted.

No.	Title	Length
0.	"Token Back to Brooklyn (hidden track)"	1:01
1.	"S-E-X-X-Y" (They Might Be Giants, Hal Cragin)	3:52
2.	"Till My Head Falls Off"	2:53
3.	"How Can I Sing Like a Girl?"	4:32
4.	"Exquisite Dead Guy"	2:02
5.	"Metal Detector"	3:50
6.	"New York City" (Lisa Marr, Robynn Iwata, Lisa Nielsen)	3:02
7.	"Your Own Worst Enemy"	1:45
8.	"XTC vs. Adam Ant"	3:36
9.	"Spiraling Shape"	4:24
10.	"James K. Polk" (They Might Be Giants, Matthew Hill)	3:05
11.	"Pet Name"	4:04
12.	"I Can Hear You"	1:57
13.	"The Bells Are Ringing"	3:31
Total length:		42:38

- "Token Back to Brooklyn" is a hidden track placed within the pregap of track 1.
- "James K. Polk" is a song about James Knox Polk, the 11th President of the United States. A sparser, drum machine driven version of James K. Polk had previously appeared on the Istanbul (Not Constantinople) EP (1990).
- "New York City" is a cover of the song by the band cub.

== Personnel ==
Credits adapted from CD liner notes, except where noted.

They Might Be Giants

- John Linnell – vocal, keyboards, horns, etc.
- John Flansburgh – vocal, guitar, etc.
- Brian Doherty – drums
- Graham Maby – bass guitar
- Eric Schermerhorn – lead guitar

Additional musicians

- Yuval Gabay – drums (0)
- Krystof Witek – violin (1, 8)
- Gregor Kitzis – violin (1)
- Ron Lawrence – viola (1)
- Garo Yellin – cello (1, 4, 7–8)
- Tim Newman – trombone (1)
- Jim O'Connor – trumpet (1)
- Hal Cragin – bass guitar (1, 6, 8)
- Sue Hadjopoulos – congas (1, 11), percussion (1, 11)
- Mo' Funky Element – drum break sample (1)
- Jay Sherman-Godfrey – acoustic guitar (3), electric slide guitar (3)
- Steve Calhoon – drums (6)
- Lyle Workman – lead guitar (6)
- Ralph Farris – viola (8)
- Amy Allison – vocal (8)
- Steve Light – vibraphone (9)
- Julian Koster – singing saw (10)
- Ron Caswell – tuba (12)
- Amanda Homi – vocals (13)

Technical

- Pat Dillett – producer
- They Might Be Giants – producers
- Kurt Hoffman – string and horn arranger (1)
- Tom Durack – mixing (1–3, 5–6)
- Artie Smith – drum production
- Tony Gillis – engineer
- Greg Thompson – engineer
- David Goodermuth – engineer
- Albert Caiati – engineer
- Peter Dilg – producer (12)
- UE Nastasi – mastering
- Barbara Glauber (Heavy Meta) – design
- Beverly Joel – design assistant
- James Wojcik – photography
- Jonathan Hoefler – They Might Be Giants typeface

== Charts ==
Chart performance for Factory Showroom
Chart (1996)	Peak position
Australian Albums (ARIA)	116
