= 1844 Democratic National Convention =

U.S. political event held in Baltimore, Maryland

- 1844 presidential election
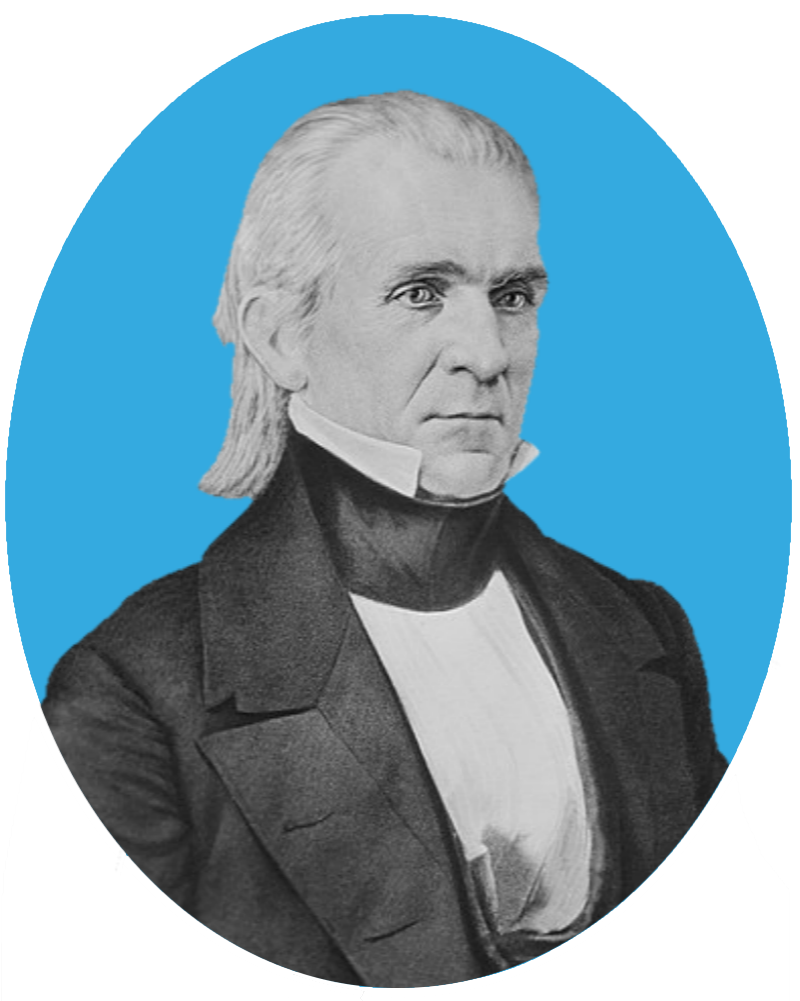
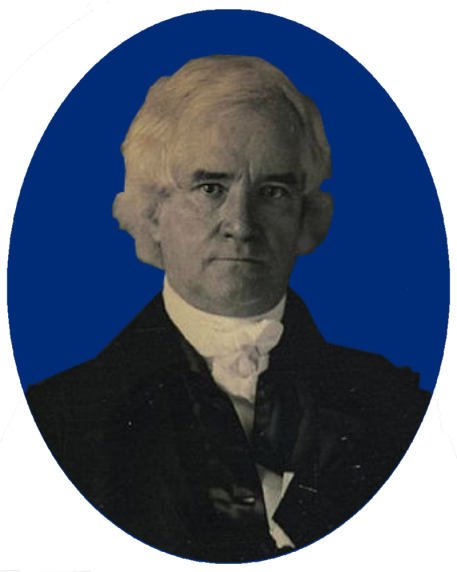
- Nominees; Polk and Dallas

Convention
- Date(s): May 27–30, 1844
- City: Baltimore, Maryland
- Venue: Odd Fellows Hall

Candidates
- Presidential nominee: James K. Polk of Tennessee
- Vice-presidential nominee: George M. Dallas of Pennsylvania

The 1844 Democratic National Convention was a presidential nominating convention held in Baltimore, Maryland from May 27 through 30. The convention nominated former Governor James K. Polk of Tennessee for president and former Senator George M. Dallas of Pennsylvania for vice president. The convention included three former vice presidents who sought the presidential nomination, John C. Calhoun, Van Buren and Richard Mentor Johnson.

Though his opposition to the annexation of Texas cost him support with expansionists and Southerners, former President Martin Van Buren entered the convention with the backing of a majority of the delegates. Before presidential balloting commenced, the convention voted to reinstate a rule requiring the presidential nominee to win two-thirds of the vote. On the first presidential ballot, Van Buren won a majority, but fell short of a two-thirds requirement. As the balloting continued, Van Buren continually lost support to Johnson, former Governor Lewis Cass of Michigan, and Senator James Buchanan of Pennsylvania.

Though he had entered the convention hoping to be nominated for vice president, Polk had the strong support of former President Andrew Jackson and was acceptable to the different factions of the party. He won the nomination on the ninth presidential ballot, thus becoming the first dark horse candidate to win a major party's presidential nomination. After Senator Silas Wright of New York declined the vice presidential nomination, the convention selected Dallas as Polk's running mate. The Democratic ticket went on to win the 1844 presidential election.

== Proceedings ==
At the outset of the convention, the leading contender was former President Martin Van Buren of New York, who had been defeated in the 1840 election. His principal opponent was Lewis Cass of Michigan, who had served as United States Secretary of War under President Andrew Jackson. The annexation of Texas was a major issue. Van Buren publicly opposed immediate annexation because it might lead to a sectional crisis over the status of slavery in the West. This position cost Van Buren the support of Southern and expansionist Democrats, but he believed that backing annexation would cost him the support of his fellow New Yorkers and other Northeasterners.

Van Buren's supporters arrived at the convention with a majority of the delegates pledged to support him on the first ballot. Cass, meanwhile, had support from a handful of Southern states, but far fewer delegates pledged to him. At the previous convention, in 1840, a majority of votes had been sufficient to secure the nomination, but this had been a departure from the party's previous rule requiring a two-thirds majority.

Early in the proceedings, Senator Robert J. Walker of Mississippi, in cooperation with Senator (and future president) James Buchanan of Pennsylvania called for reinstatement of the 1832 and 1835 convention rule requiring the nominee to win two-thirds of the votes. Following a historical pattern in which a minority faction of Northern Democrats delivered votes to produce southern wing victories for pro-slavery legislation, the Van Burenite delegates split over the pivotal vote. Fully one-third of the pro-Van Buren delegates (52 of 154) voted to reinstate the two-thirds rule, along with 90 of 104 anti-Van Buren delegates, producing a final vote of 148 to 116. The rule would remain in place until the 1936 Democratic National Convention, when it was revoked by supporters of Franklin D. Roosevelt.

== Presidential nomination ==
=== Presidential candidates ===
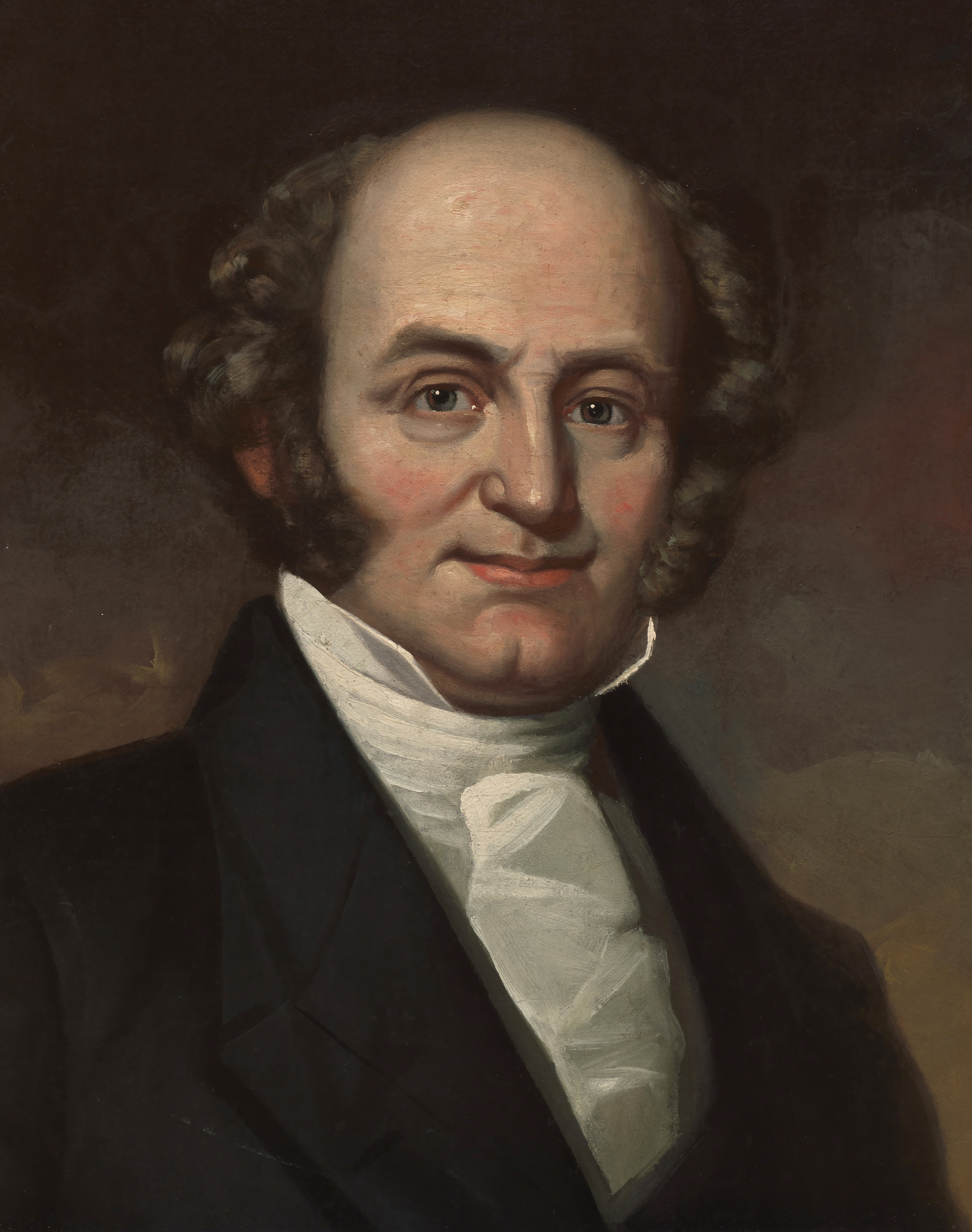
Former President
Martin Van Buren
of New York

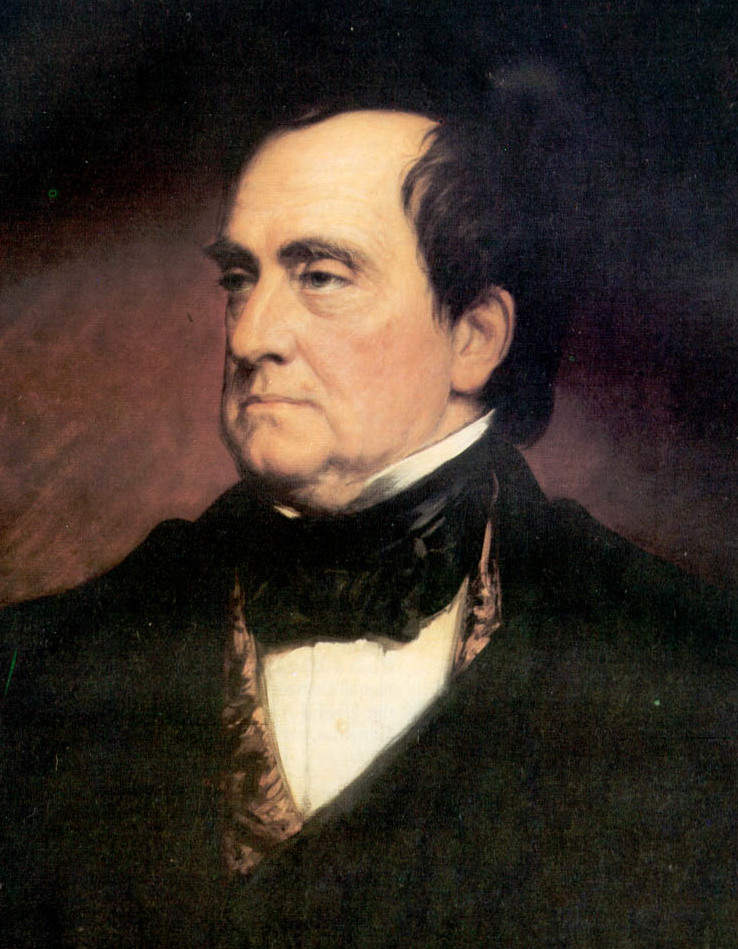
Former Ambassador to France
Lewis Cass
of Michigan

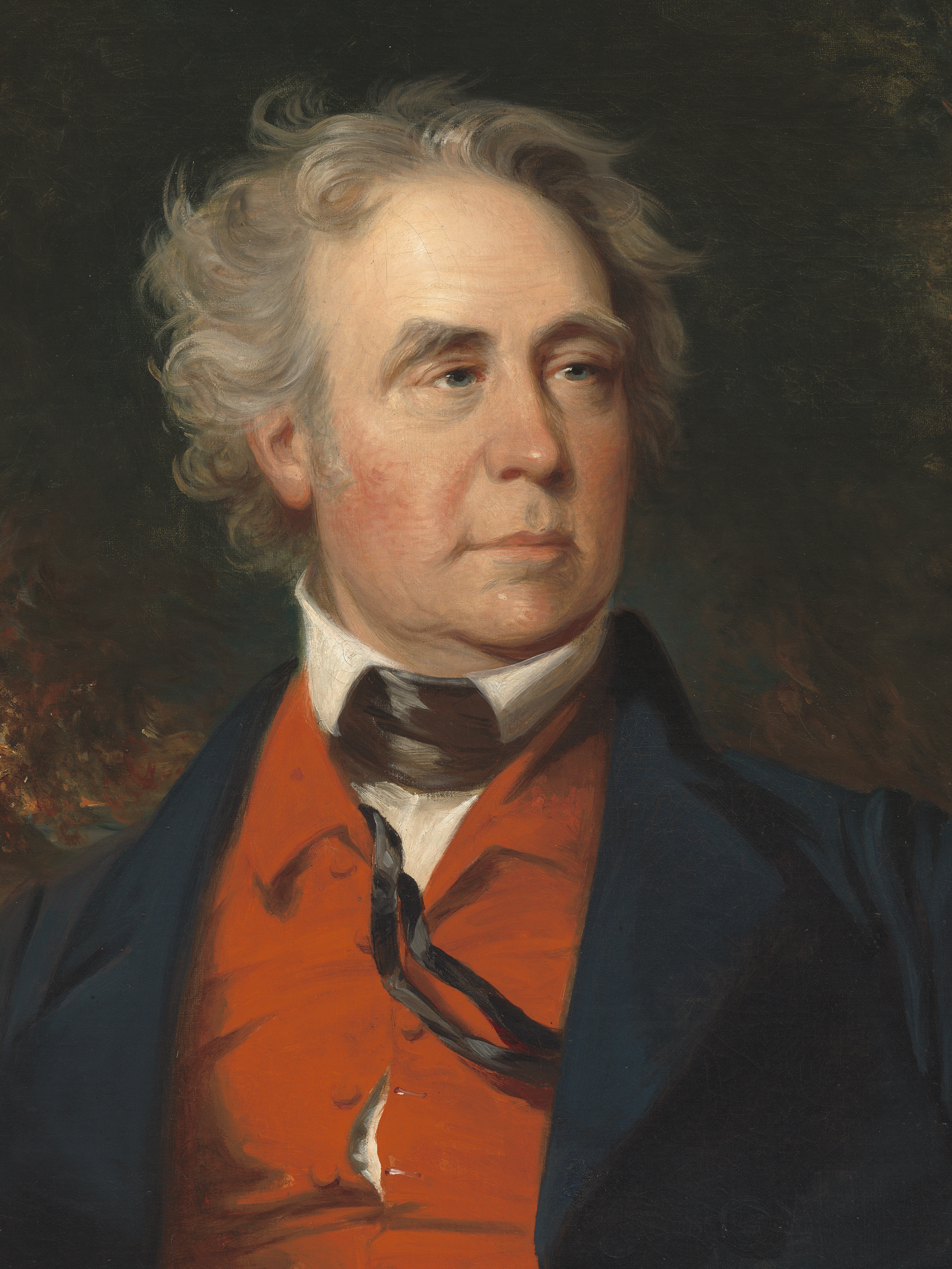
Former Vice President
Richard M. Johnson
of Kentucky

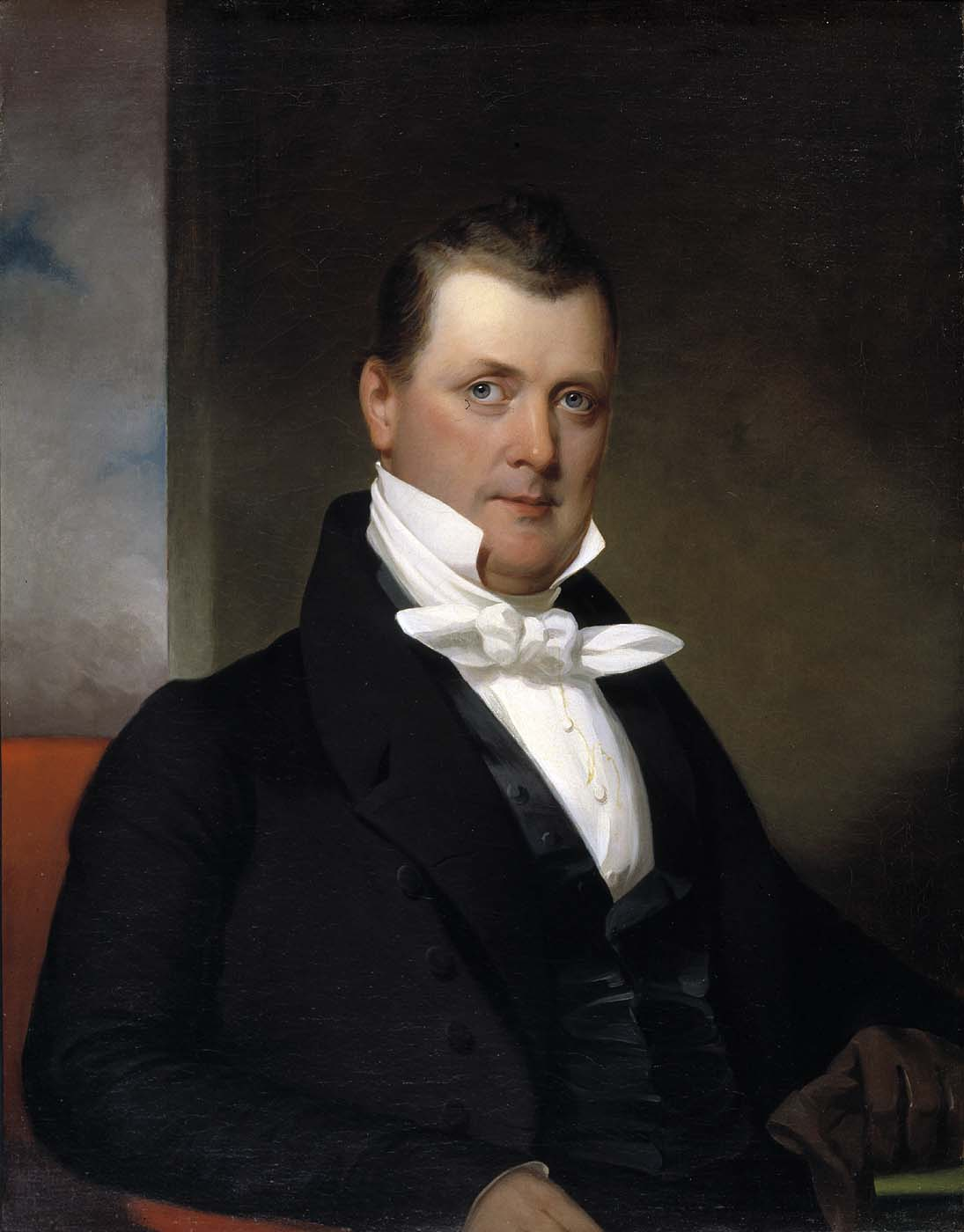
Senator
James Buchanan
of Pennsylvania

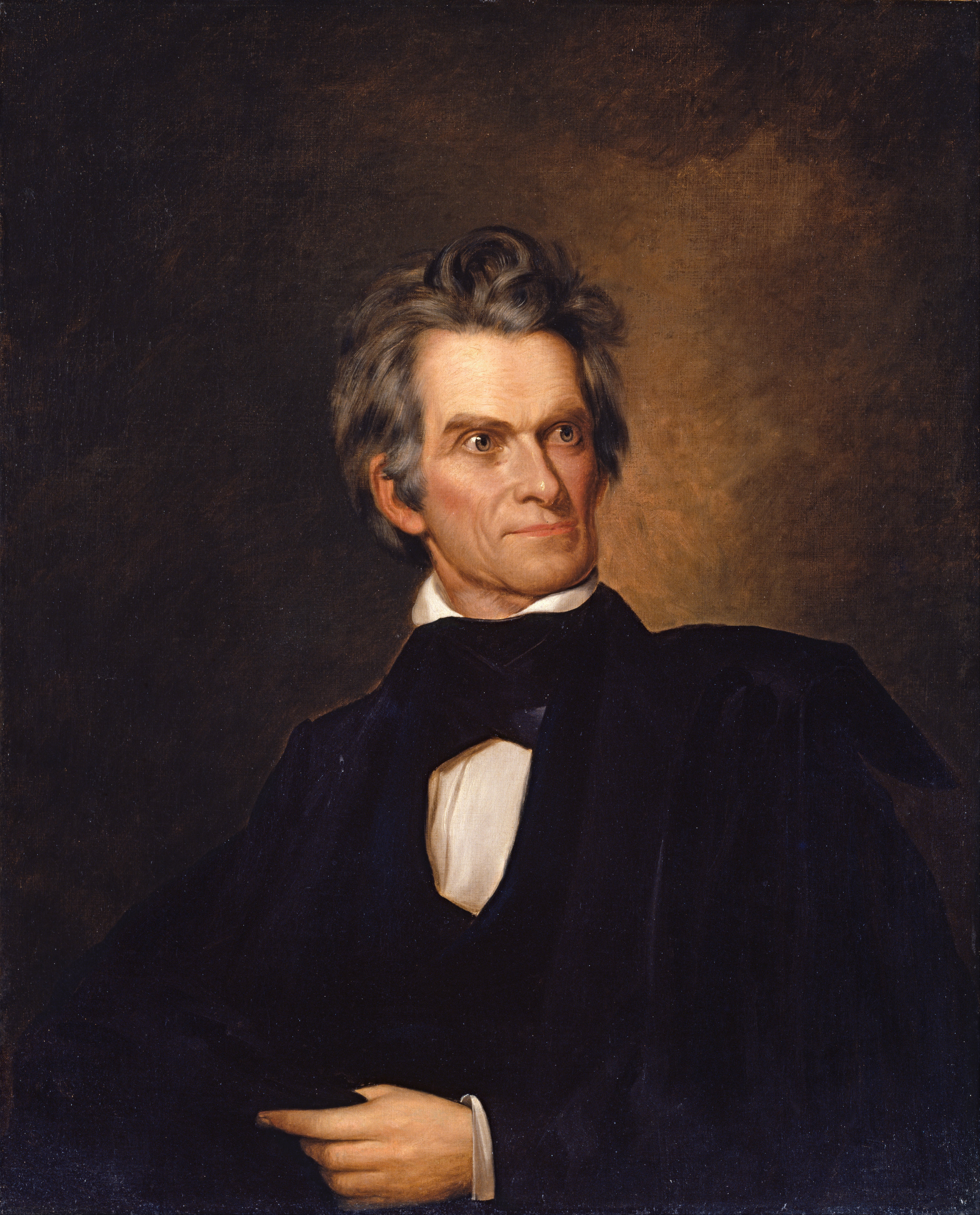
Secretary of State
John C. Calhoun
of South Carolina

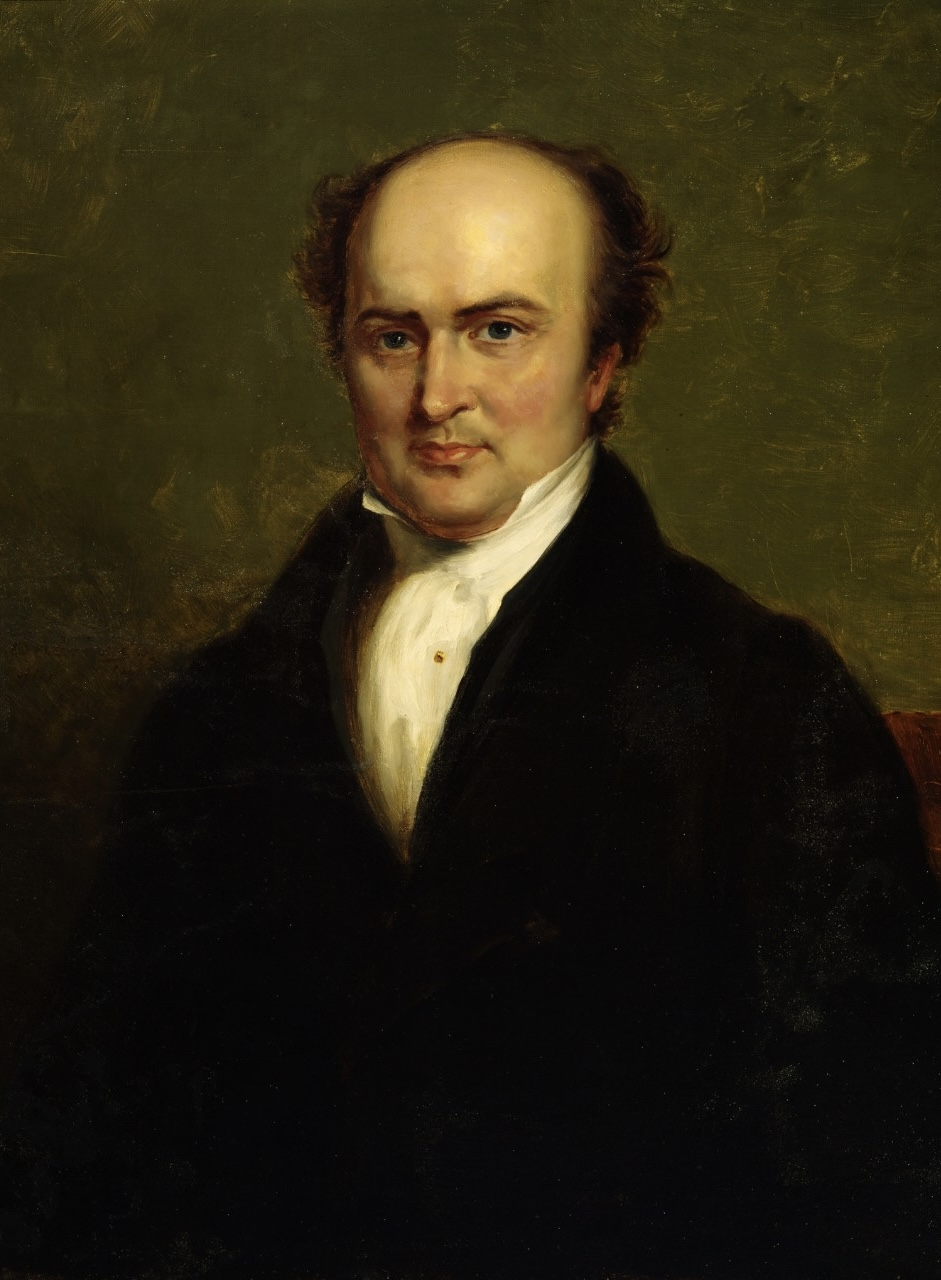
Senator
Levi Woodbury
of New Hampshire

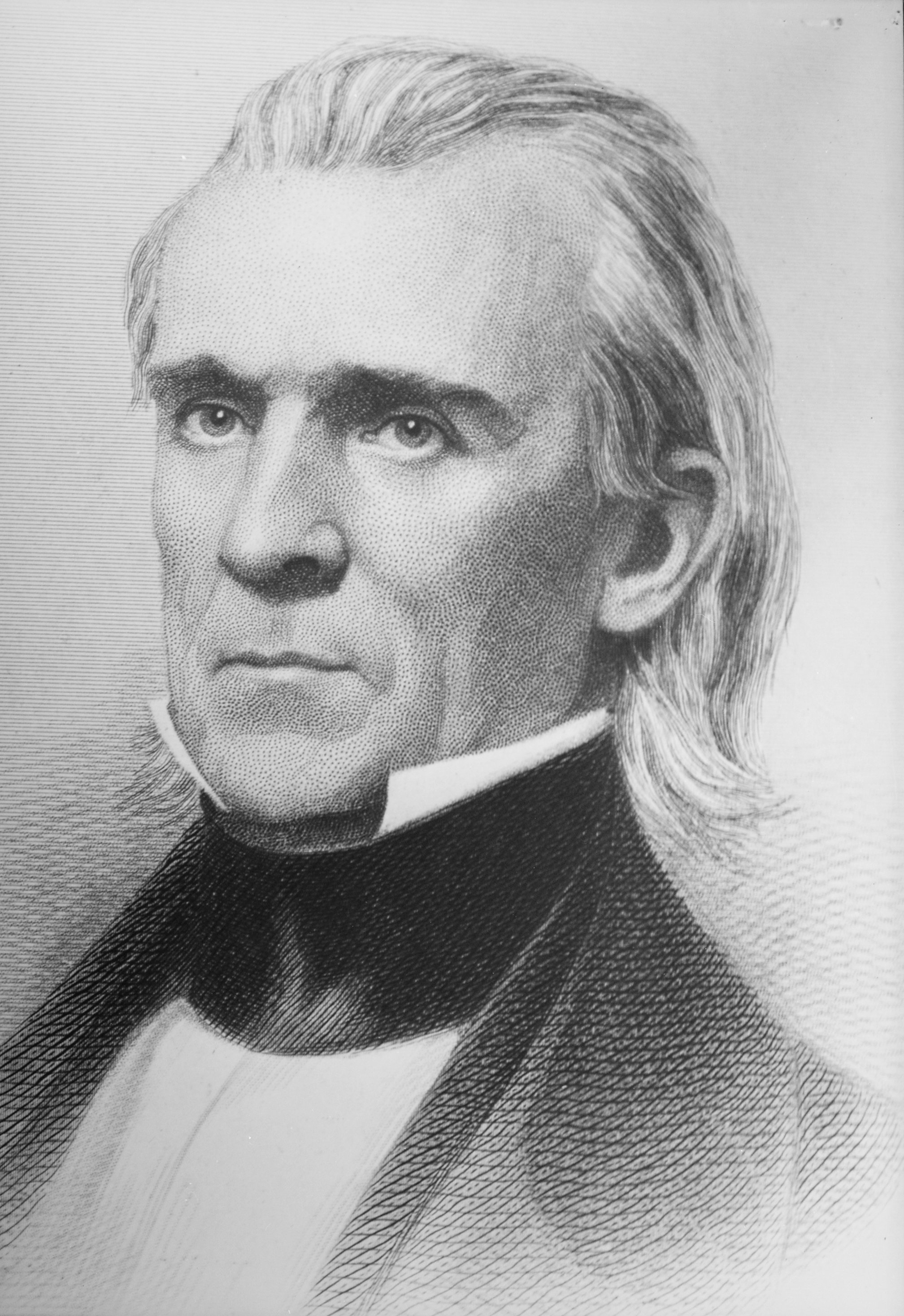
James K. Polk, Democratic Party "dark horse" presidential nominee

Van Buren supporters persisted in spite of the two-thirds rule setback, garnering 146 votes for their candidate on the first ballot, a 55% simple majority, but short of the now required 177 votes. Middle and Deep South pro-annexationists opposed Van Buren 75 to 3, depriving northern anti-annexationists the 31 votes needed for victory.

Support for Van Buren dwindled in subsequent ballots from 146 to 99, at which point Van Burenites were reduced to blocking nominations of numerous candidates, among them James Buchanan, Lewis Cass of Michigan, John C. Calhoun, and Levi Woodbury of New Hampshire. Incumbent President John Tyler, a former Democrat who was elected to the vice presidency on the 1840 Whig Party ticket, also hoped to win the support of delegates, but he was unable to find any backers. Southern intransigence had succeeded in eliminating Van Buren and his stand on Texas annexation. If the Democratic Party was to avoid dissolution at a national level, an acceptable nominee, fully committed to immediate annexation would be required, yet capable of unifying the party in the general election. Van Buren was open to deferring to Senator Silas Wright of New York, but Wright was a major supporter of Van Buren for president and had already declined to be considered.

On the eighth ballot, the historian George Bancroft, a delegate from Massachusetts, proposed former Speaker of the House of Representatives James K. Polk as a compromise candidate. Polk, who had also served as Governor of Tennessee, had entered the convention in hopes of becoming the vice presidential nominee. However, former President Andrew Jackson, who remained popular in the party, believed Polk was just the man to head the Democratic ticket. Although a slaveholder himself, Polk never enunciated a slavery expansionist position with respect to Texas annexation, as had John C. Calhoun and the southern extremists. Despite Polk's fervent advocacy for annexation, he had remained loyal to Van Buren throughout the Texas controversy, and anti-annexationist Van Burenites were willing to accept Polk, with reservations, having already recognized him as a suitable vice-presidential choice to have complemented a Van Buren ticket. Southern Democrats benefited from the Tyler-Calhoun machinations in eliminating Martin Van Buren as a presidential candidate, and clearing the way for the pro-annexation nationalist Polk. On the ninth ballot, Van Buren instructed his delegates to support Polk, beginning a stampede to Polk that ended with him winning the nomination unanimously. Consequently, Polk became the first dark horse, or little-known, presidential nominee. Van Buren complied with his party's decision to unite under a pro-annexation candidate, and worked to win New York state for Polk.

Despite Whig efforts to cast Polk as an unknown – "Who is James K. Polk?" they asked rhetorically – he was respected as an effective political operator. His sobriquet "The Young Hickory" contained a dual reference, one to his mentor Andrew "Old Hickory" Jackson, and one to the term Young America, a reference to an international movements struggling to establish republican forms of government and the overthrow of monarchies and ascribed to Manifest Destiny Democrats. As a national imperialist, he exhibited an unwavering support for Manifest Destiny, perceived as a non-sectional devotion to expansionism, whether slave-soil Texas or free-soil Oregon Territory. Polk argued that Texas and Oregon had always belonged to the United States by right. He called for "the immediate reannexation of Texas" and for the "reoccupation" of the disputed Oregon territory. Polk's political reputation was expected to diffuse northern Democratic resentment towards the Slavepower, while delivering Texas to the Deep South.

Presidential Ballot
Candidate	1st	2nd	3rd	4th	5th	6th	7th	8th	9th (Note: before shifts)	9th (Note: after shifts)
Polk	0	0	0	0	0	0	0	44	231	266
Van Buren	146	127	121	111	103	101	99	104	2	0
Cass	83	94	92	105	107	116	123	114	29	0
Johnson	24	33	38	32	29	23	21	0	0	0
Buchanan	4	9	11	17	26	25	22	2	0	0
Calhoun	6	1	2	1	1	1	1	2	2	0
Woodbury	2	0	2	0	0	0	0	0	0	0
Stewart	1	1	0	0	0	0	0	0	0	0
Morton	0	0	0	0	0	0	0	0	1	0
Not Voting	0	1	0	0	0	0	0	0	1	0
Not Represented	9	9	9	9	9	9	9	9	9	9

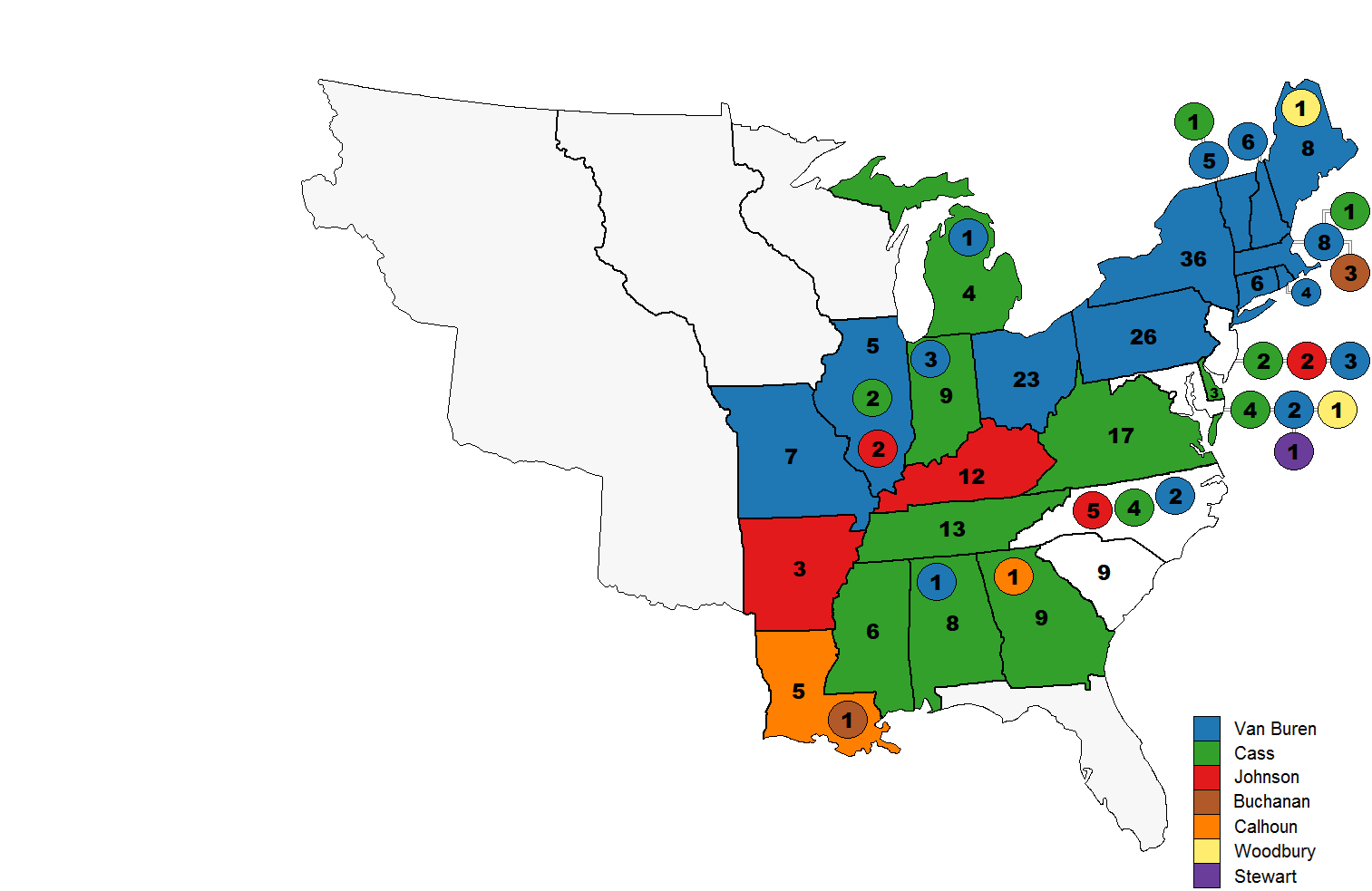
1st Presidential Ballot

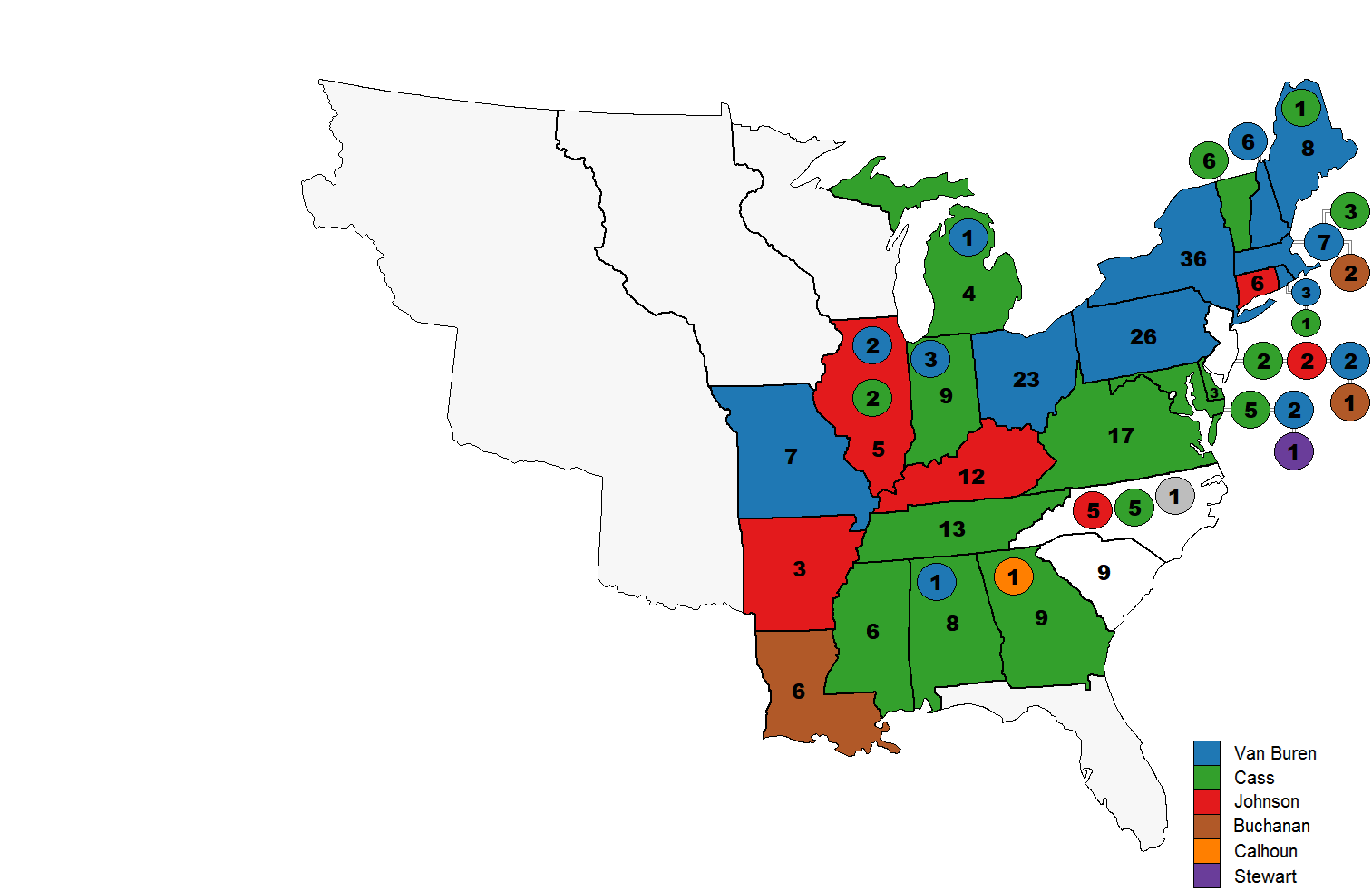
2nd Presidential Ballot

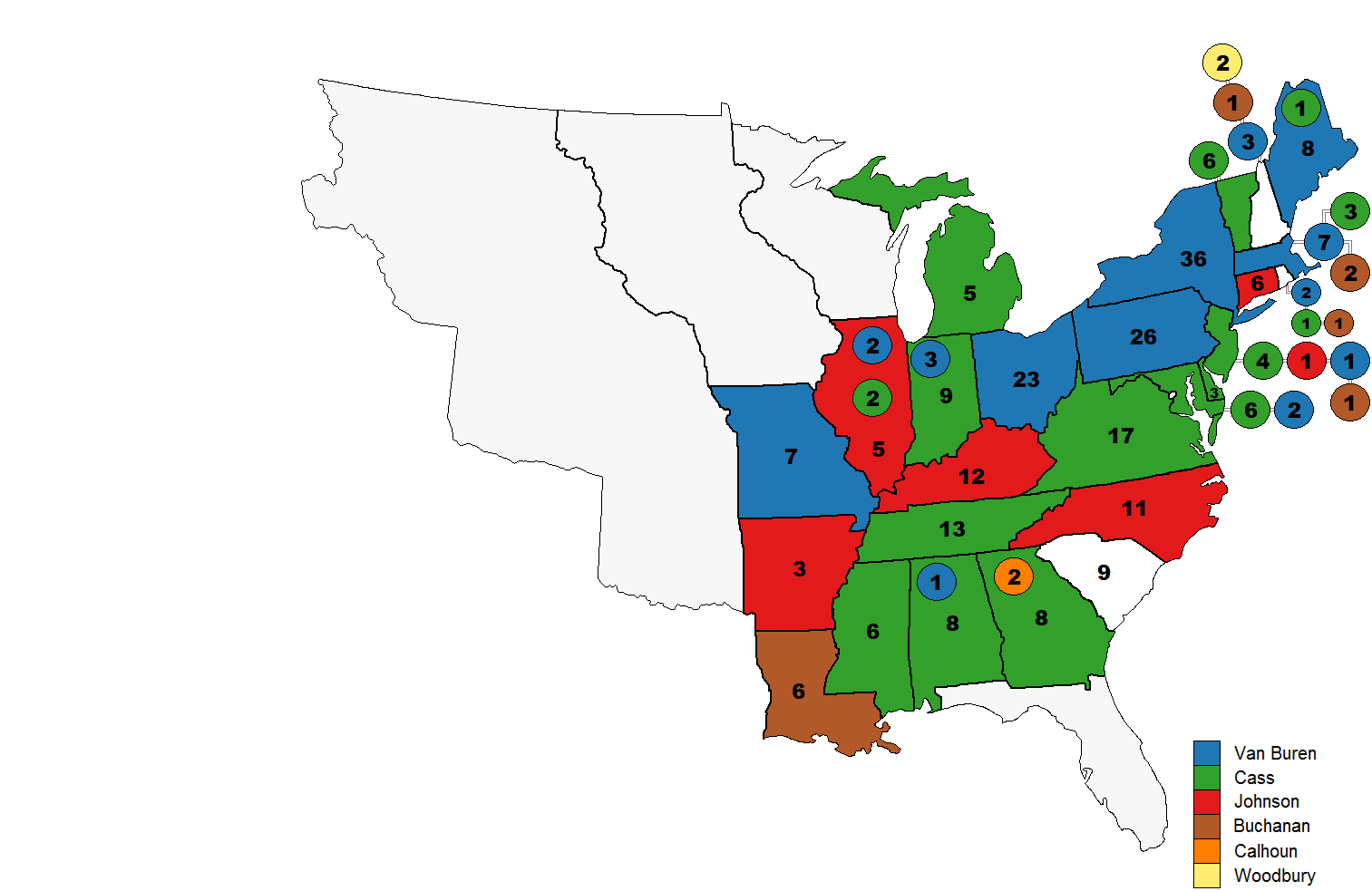
3rd Presidential Ballot

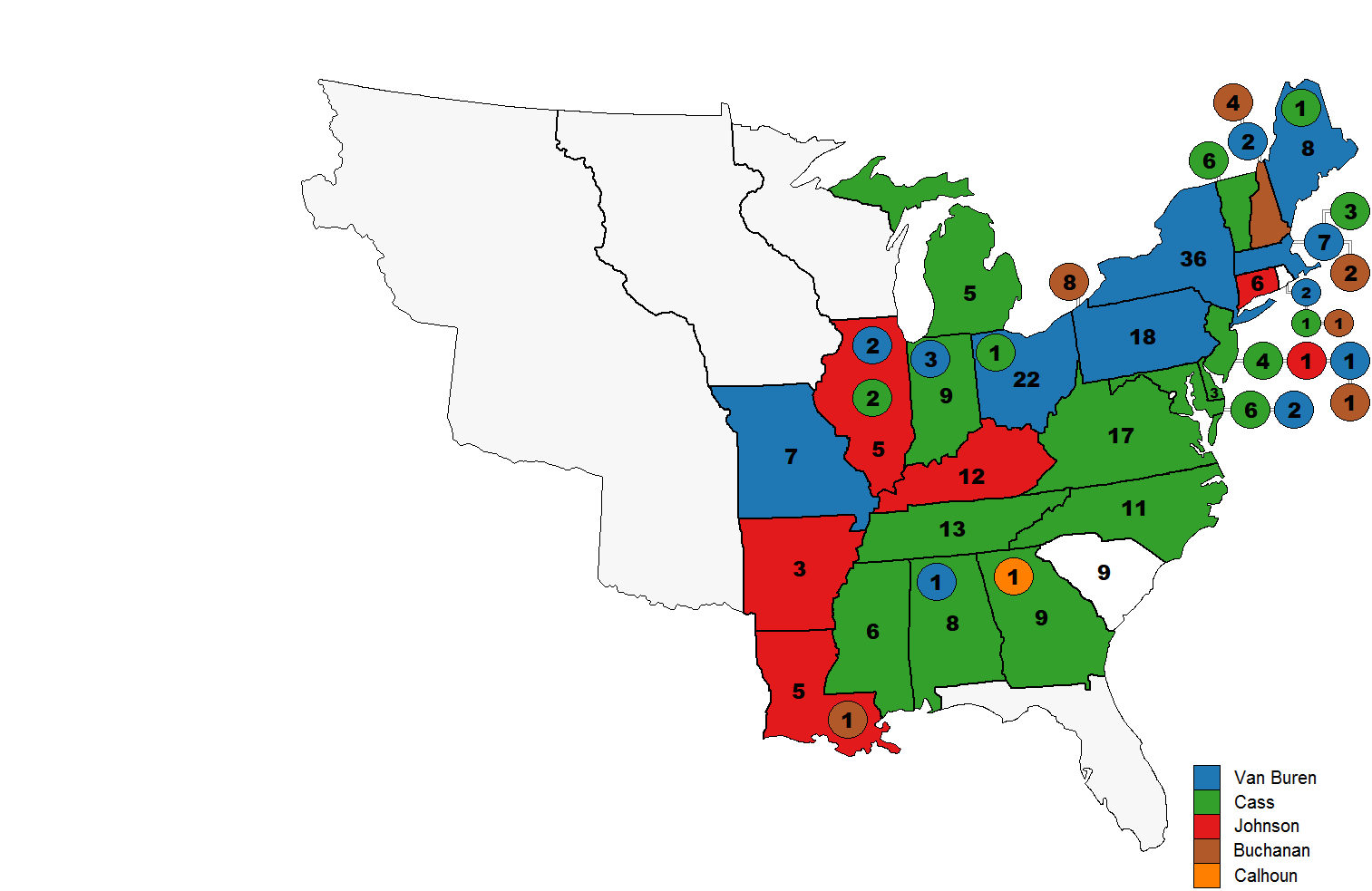
4th Presidential Ballot

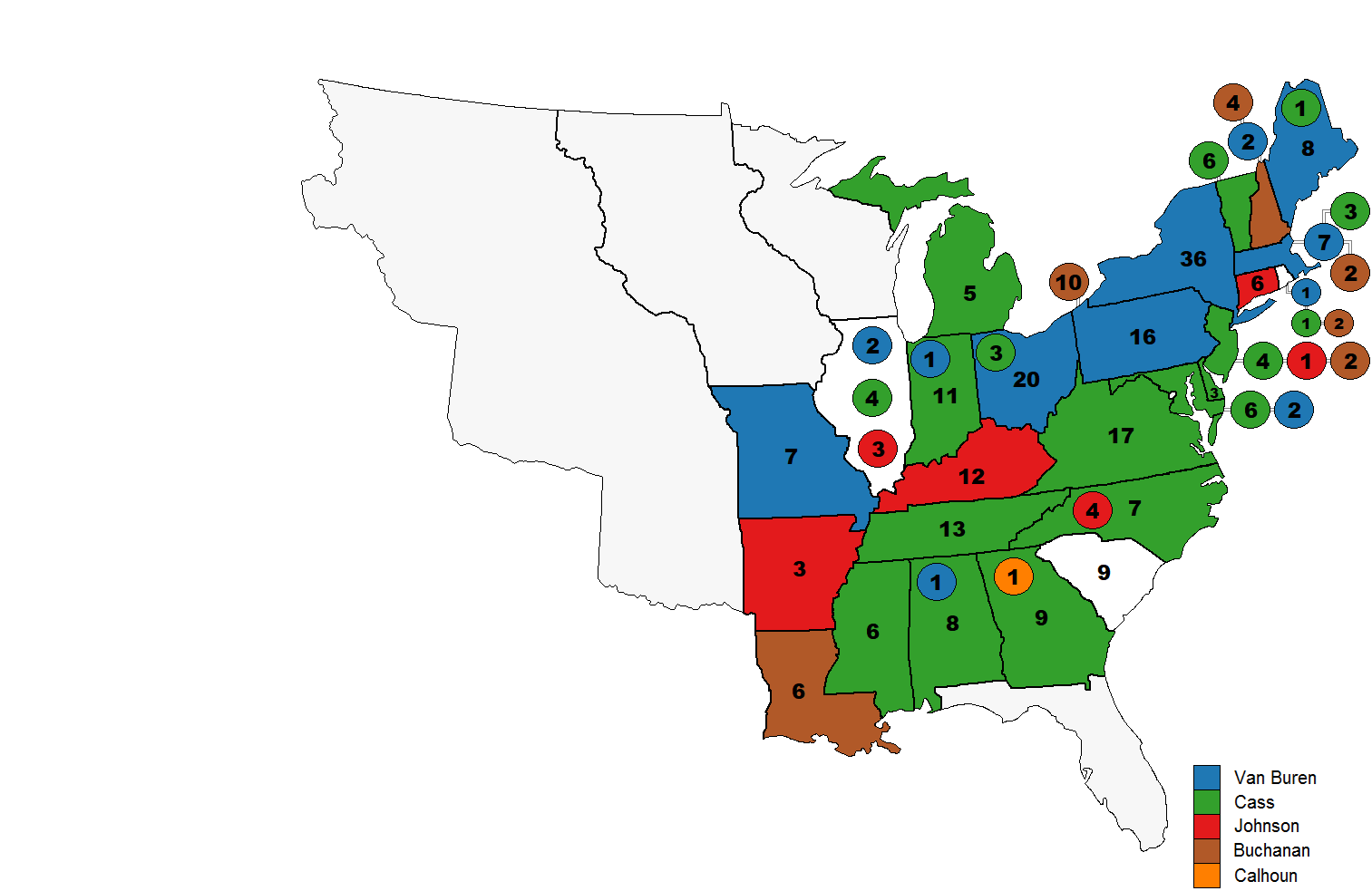
5th Presidential Ballot

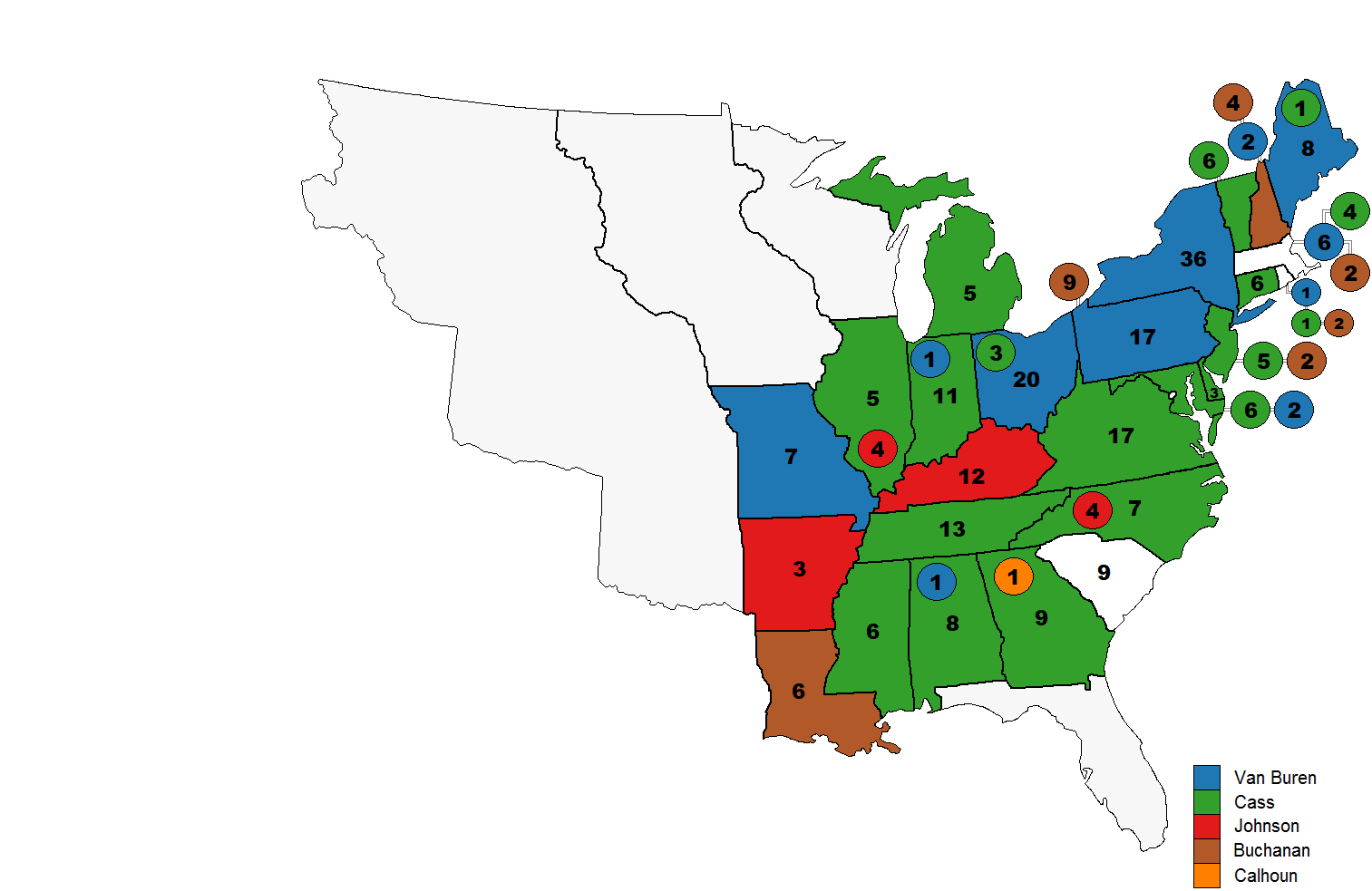
6th Presidential Ballot

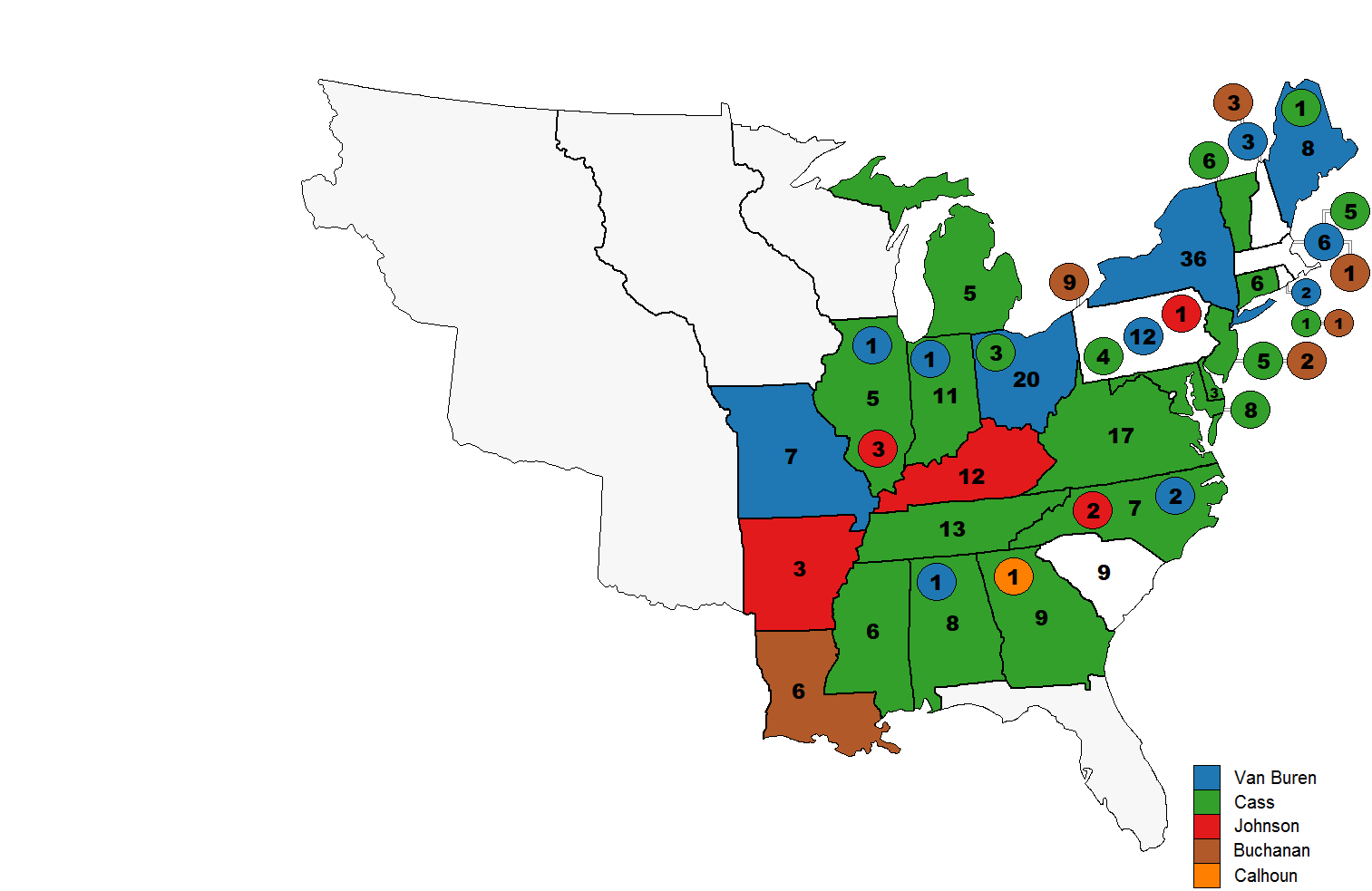
7th Presidential Ballot

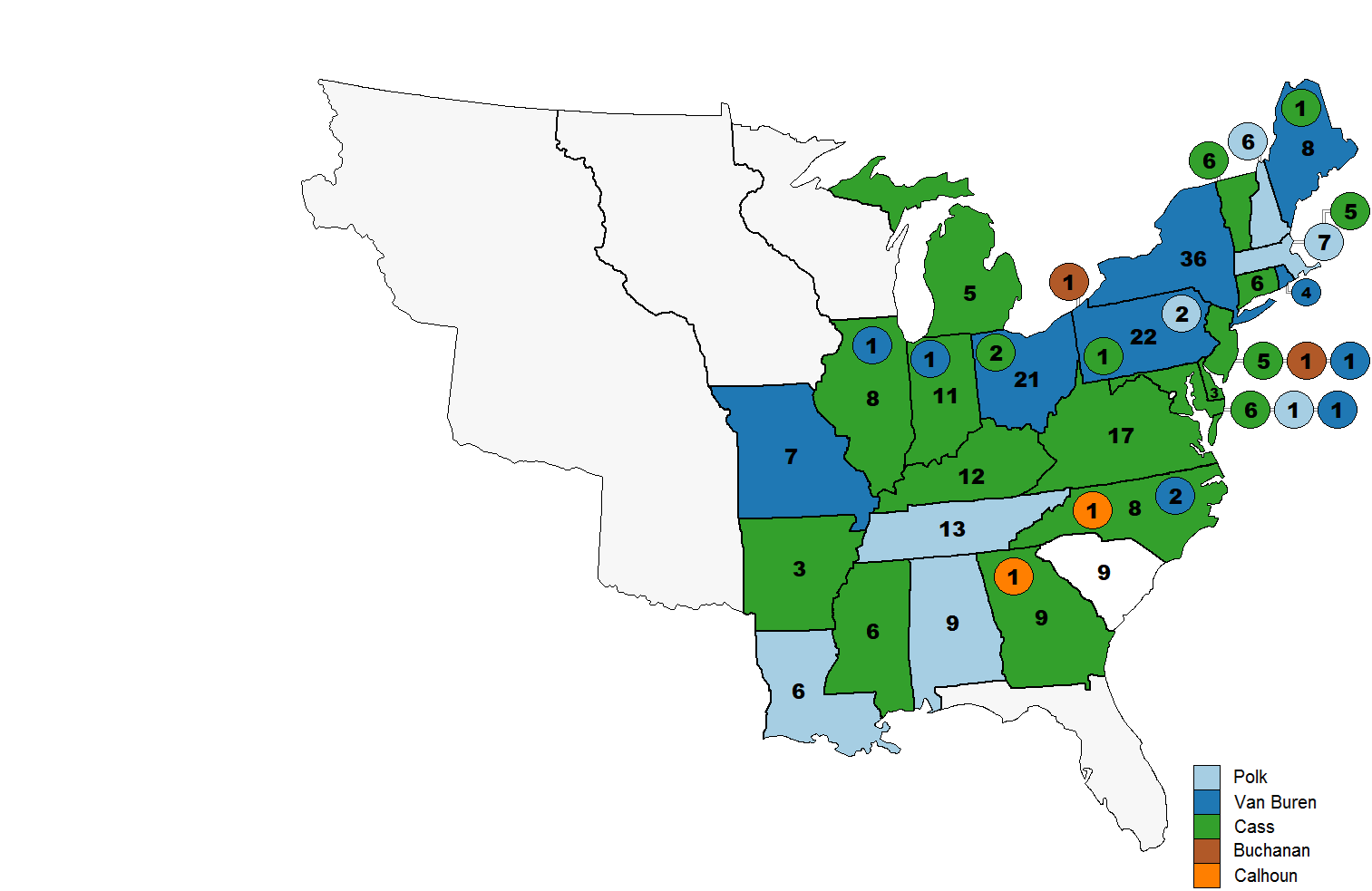
8th Presidential Ballot

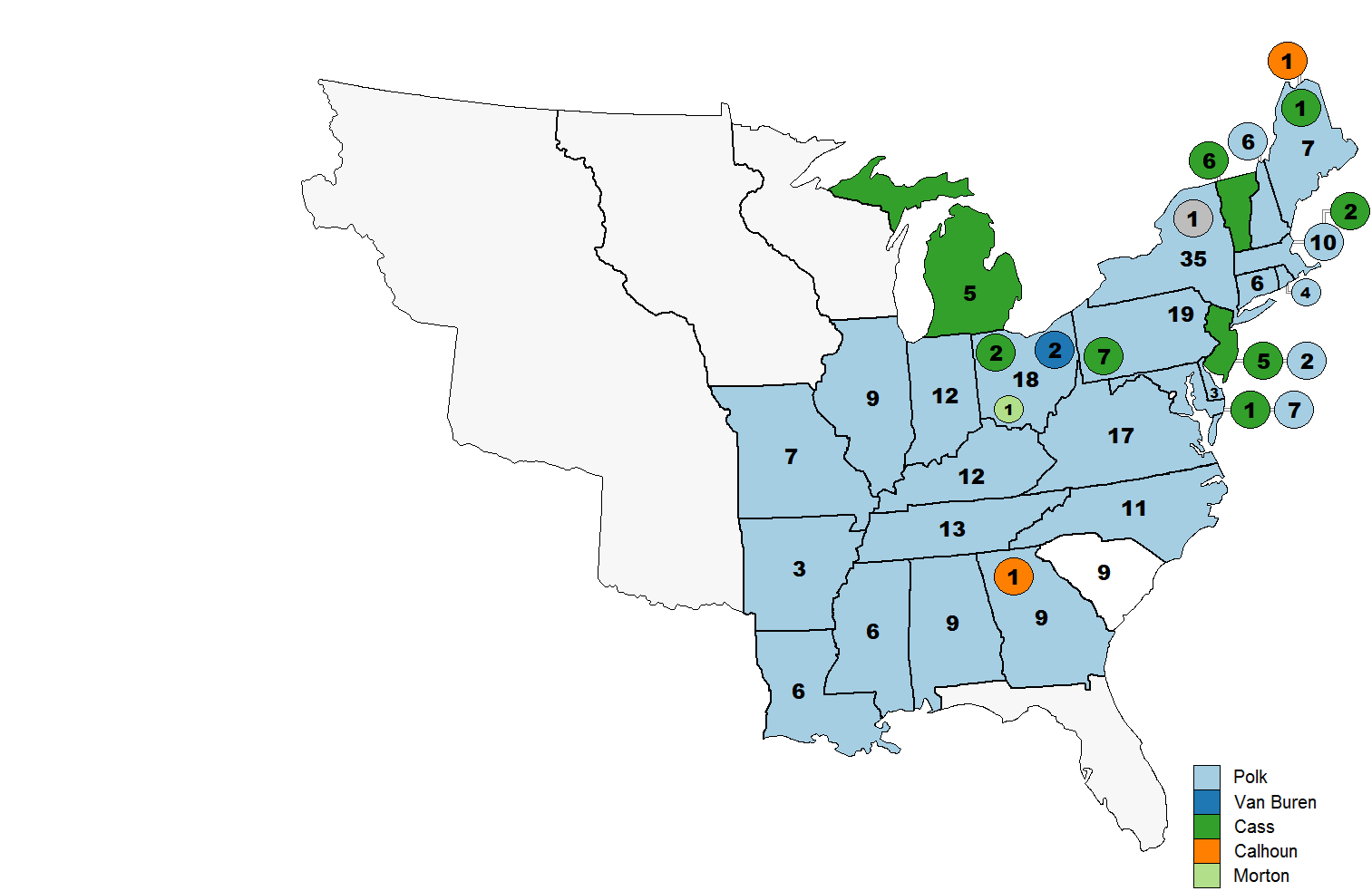
9th Presidential Ballot Before Shifts

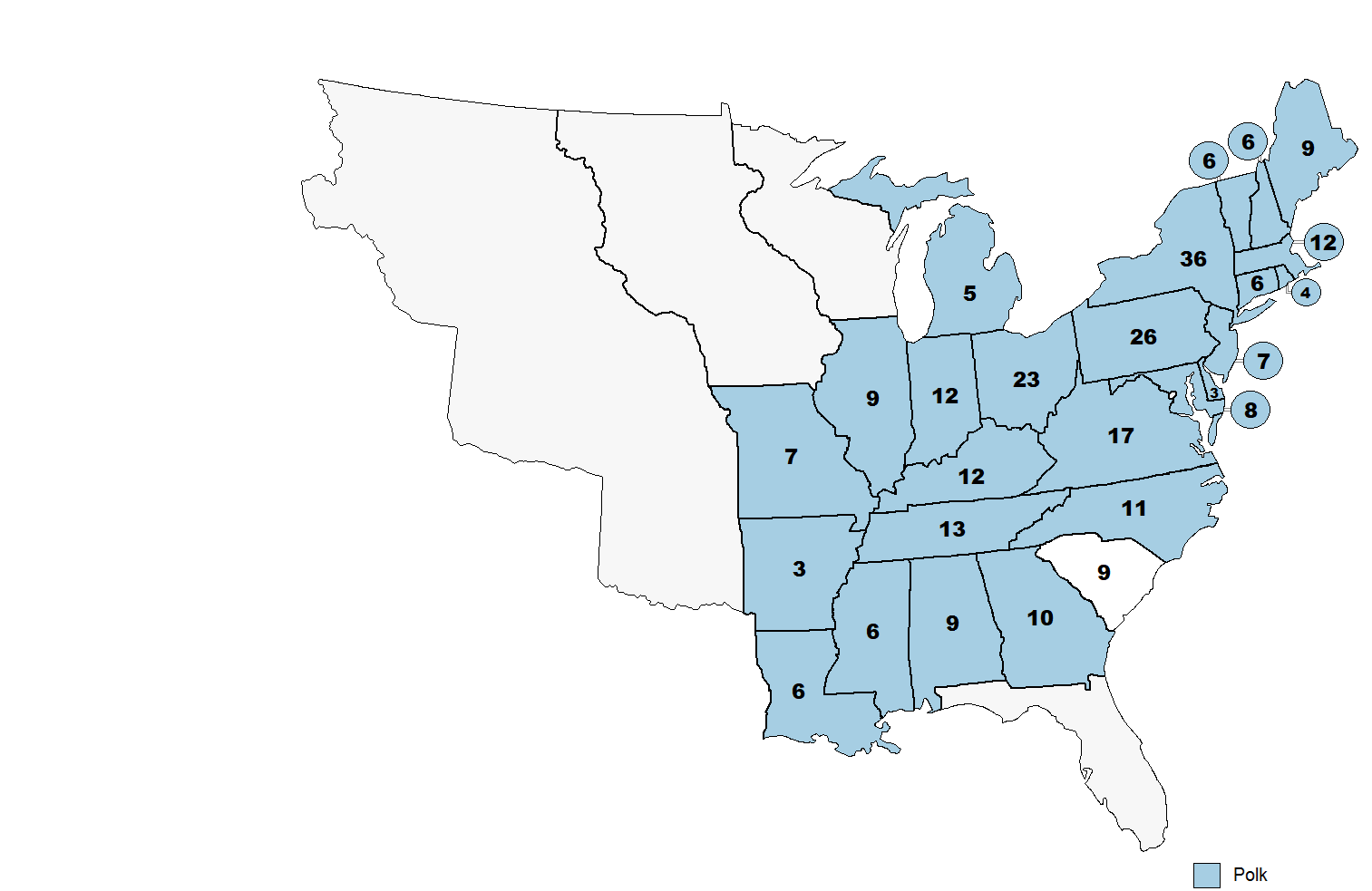
9th Presidential Ballot After Shifts

== Vice presidential nomination ==
=== Vice presidential candidates ===
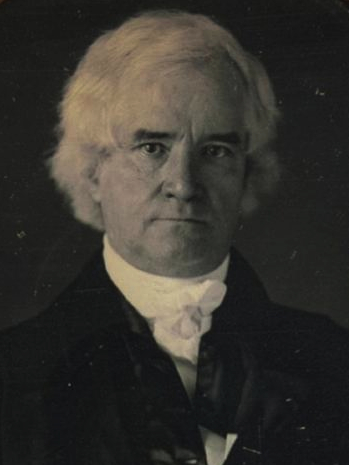
Former Minister to Russia
George M. Dallas
of Pennsylvania

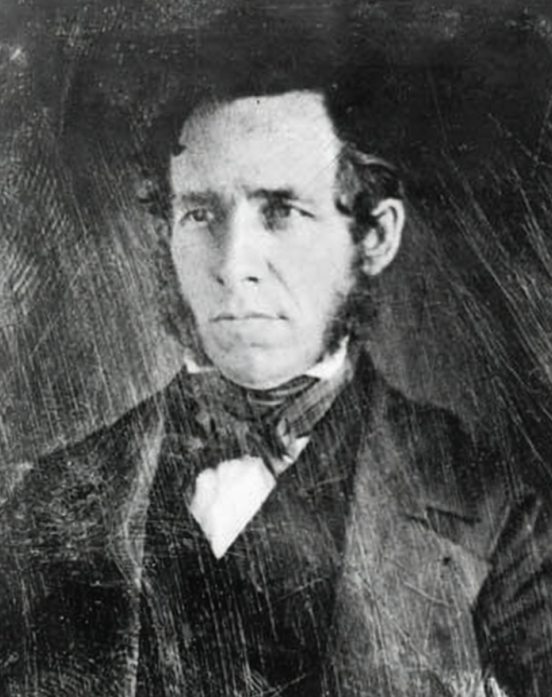
Senator
John Fairfield
of Maine

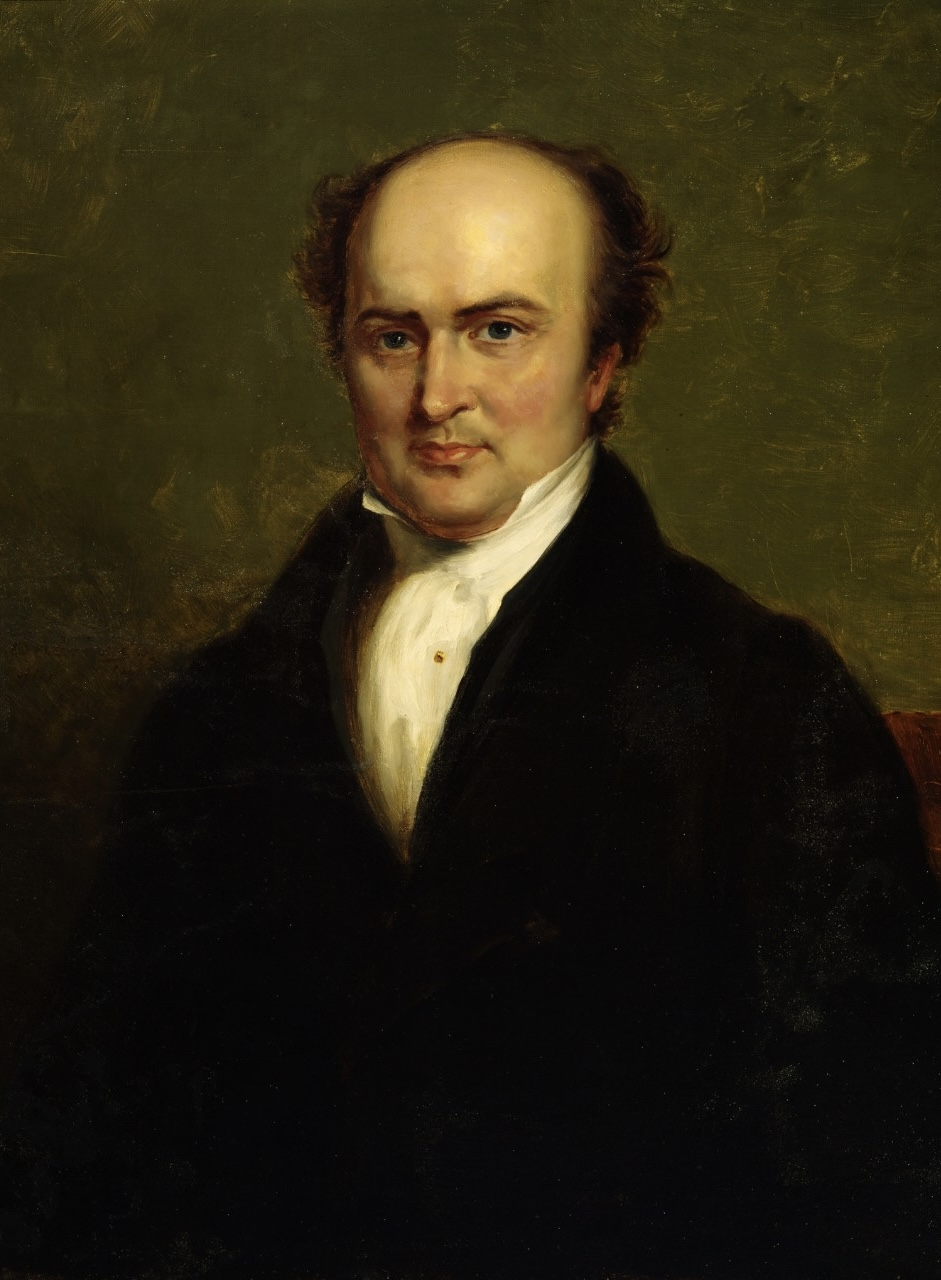
Senator
Levi Woodbury
of New Hampshire

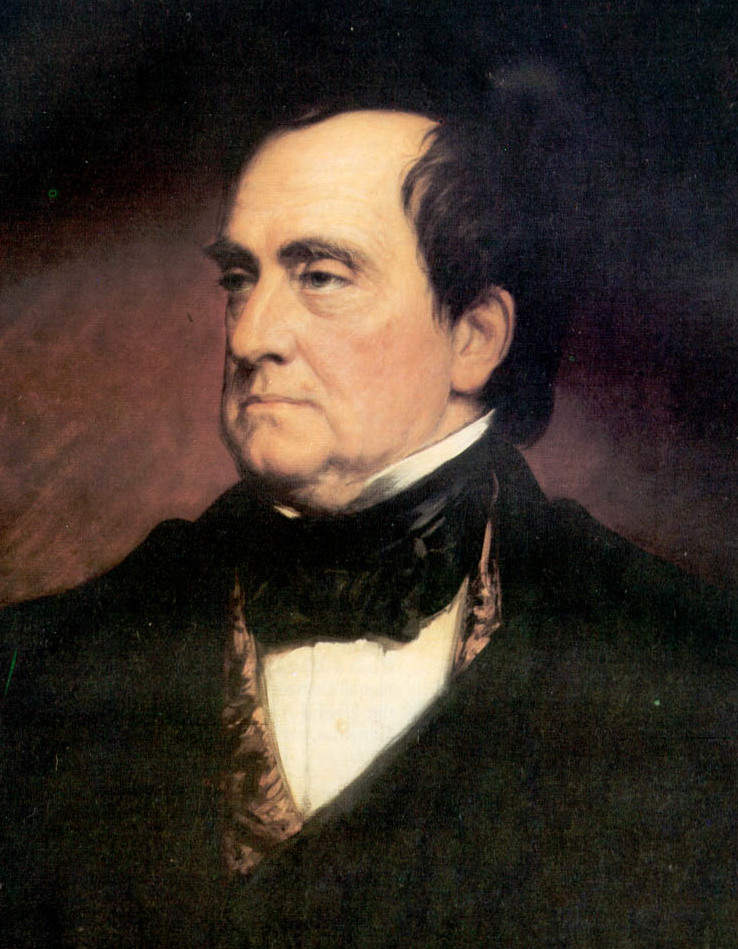
Former Ambassador to France
Lewis Cass
of Michigan

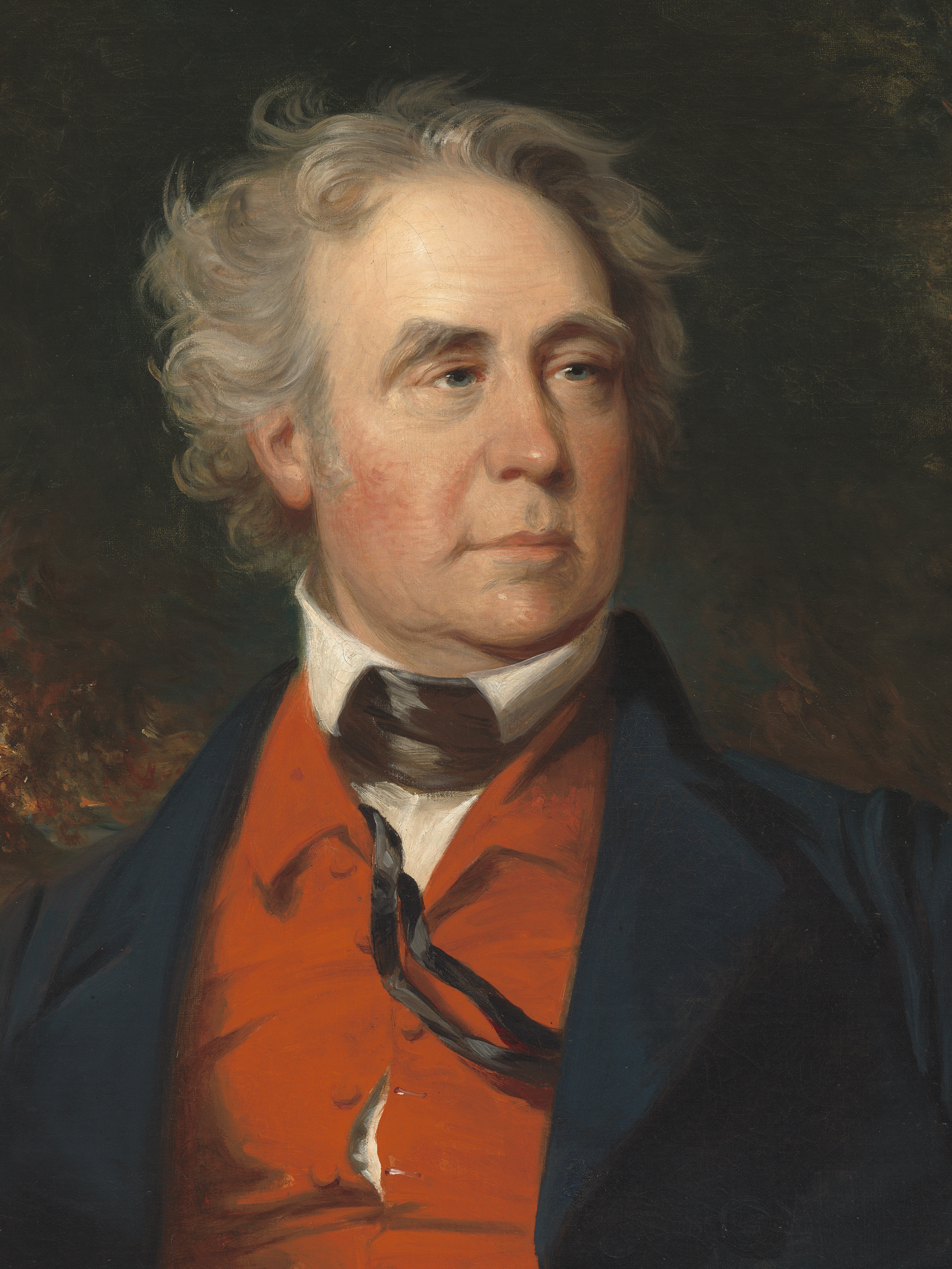
Former Vice President
Richard M. Johnson
of Kentucky

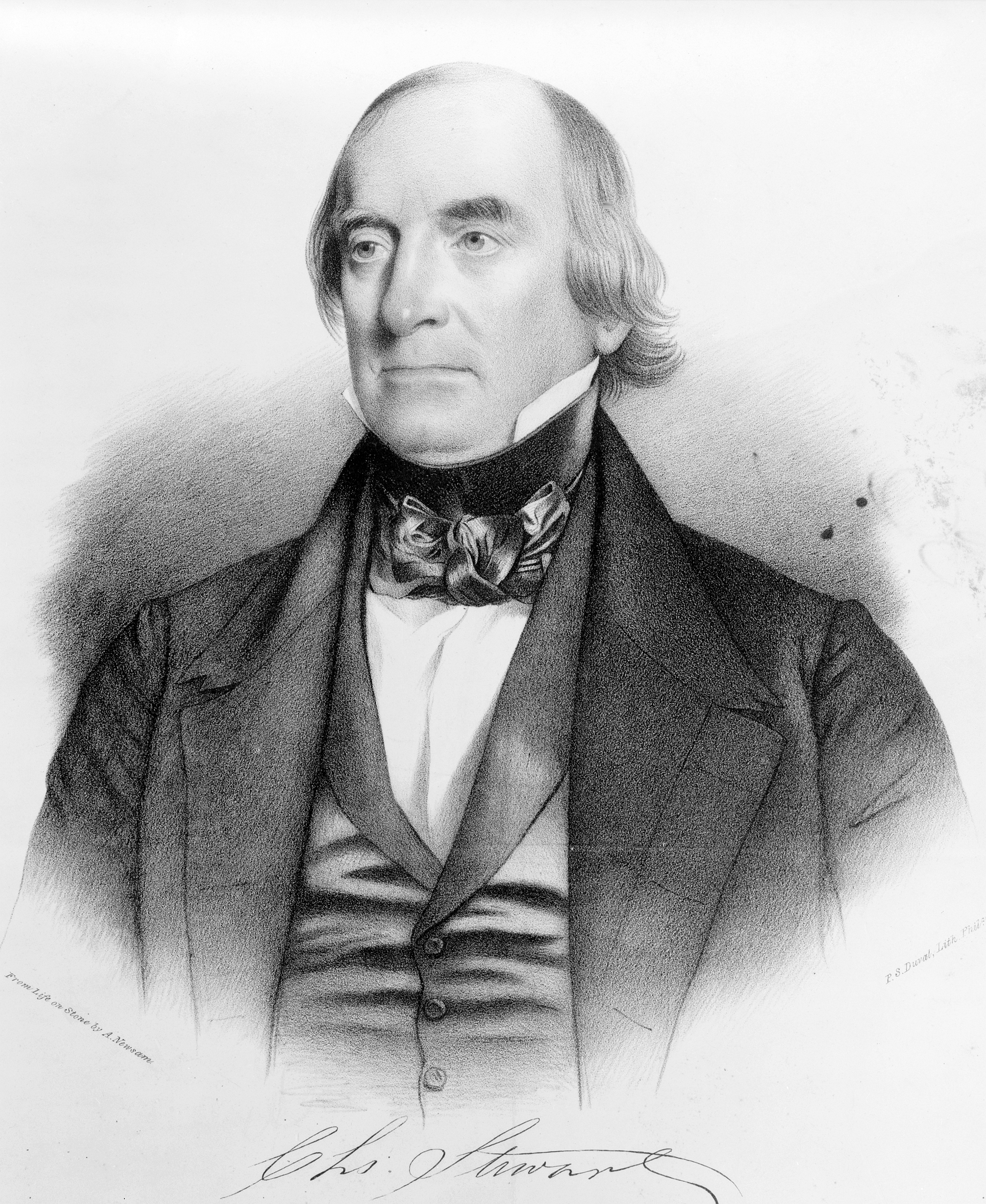
United States Navy Captain
Charles Stewart
of Pennsylvania

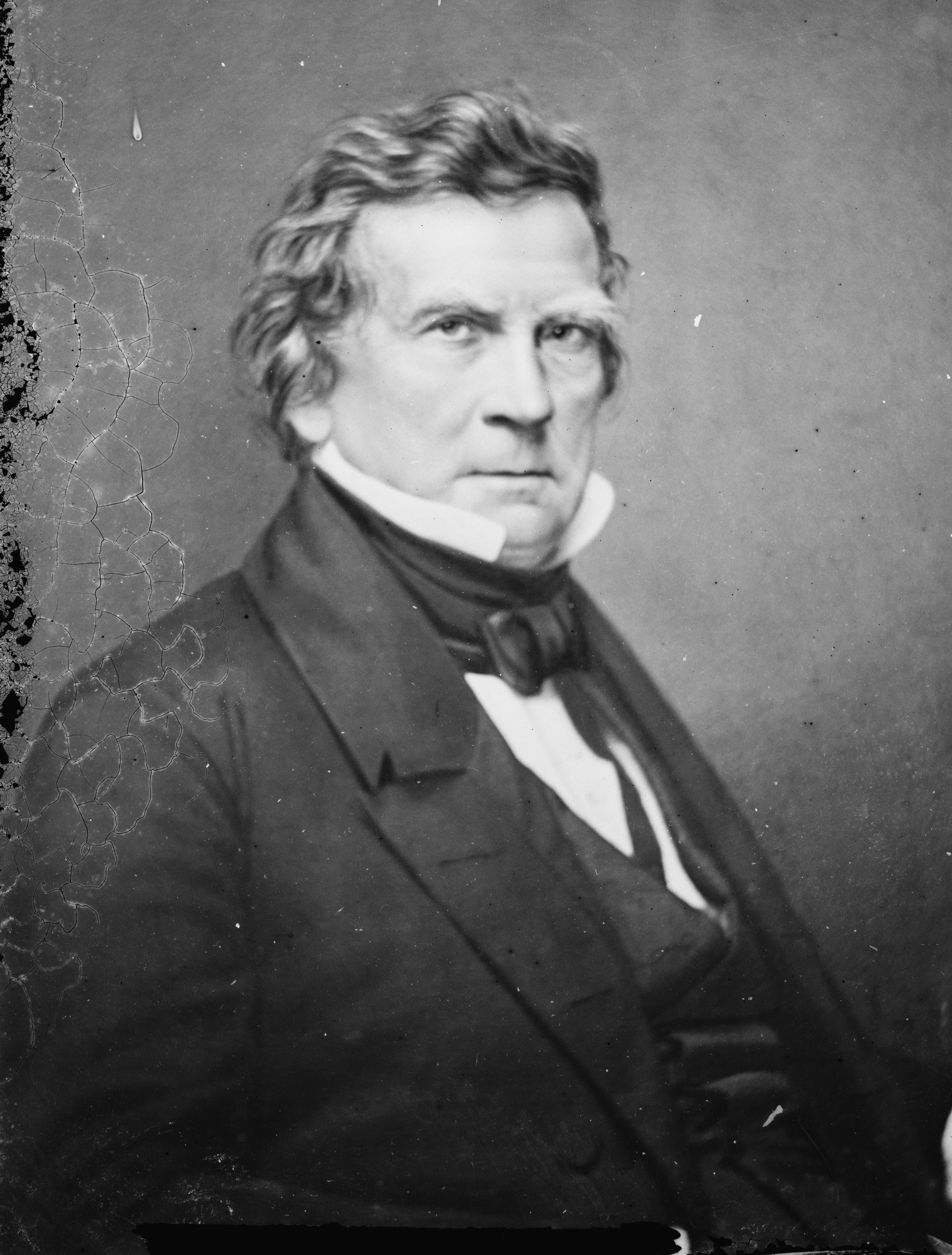
Former Governor
William L. Marcy
of New York

=== Declined ===
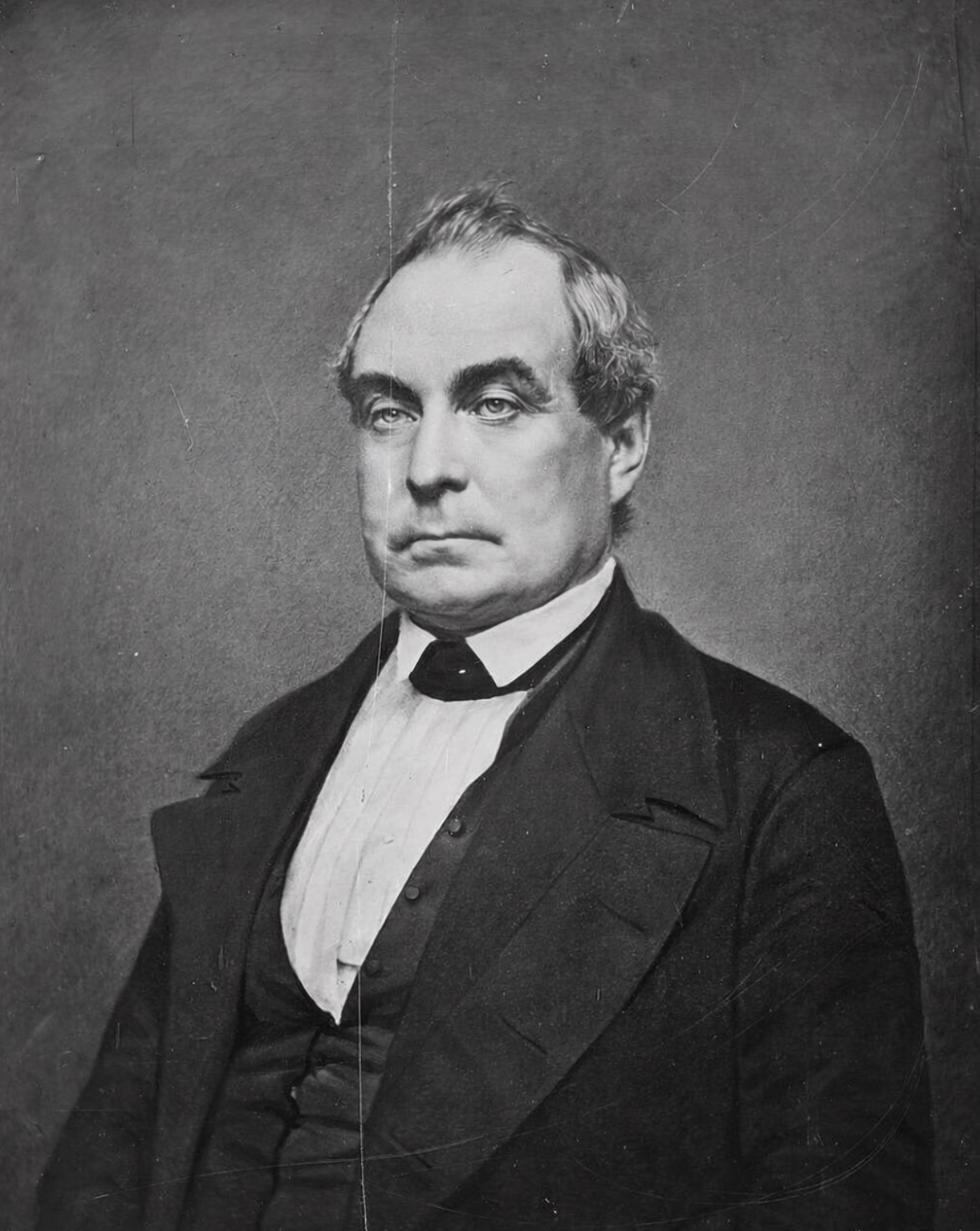
Senator
Silas Wright
of New York

Polk and Richard Mentor Johnson had both campaigned for the vice presidency prior to the convention, but with Polk's nomination for president, the party looked to the northern states for a running mate.

The anti-annexationist Silas Wright, US Senator from New York, was nominated almost unanimously on the first ballot, but when he was informed by telegraph at the US Capitol, Wright declined, partly out of refusal to support a ticket backing the annexation of Texas, and partly because he did not want to be accused of intriguing against Van Buren to benefit himself. Wright refused to reconsider despite Democratic Party attempts to convince him to do so.

On the second ballot, John Fairfield attracted significant support, but this was not even close to the 184 votes required for nomination: on the third ballot, the convention settled on George M. Dallas, a conservative from Pennsylvania.

Vice Presidential Ballot
Candidate	1st	2nd	3rd
Dallas	0	13	220
Wright	258	0	0
Fairfield	0	93	30
Woodbury	8	56	6
Cass	0	39	0
Johnson	0	26	0
Stewart	0	23	0
Marcy	0	5	0
Not Voting	0	11	10
Not Represented	9	9	9

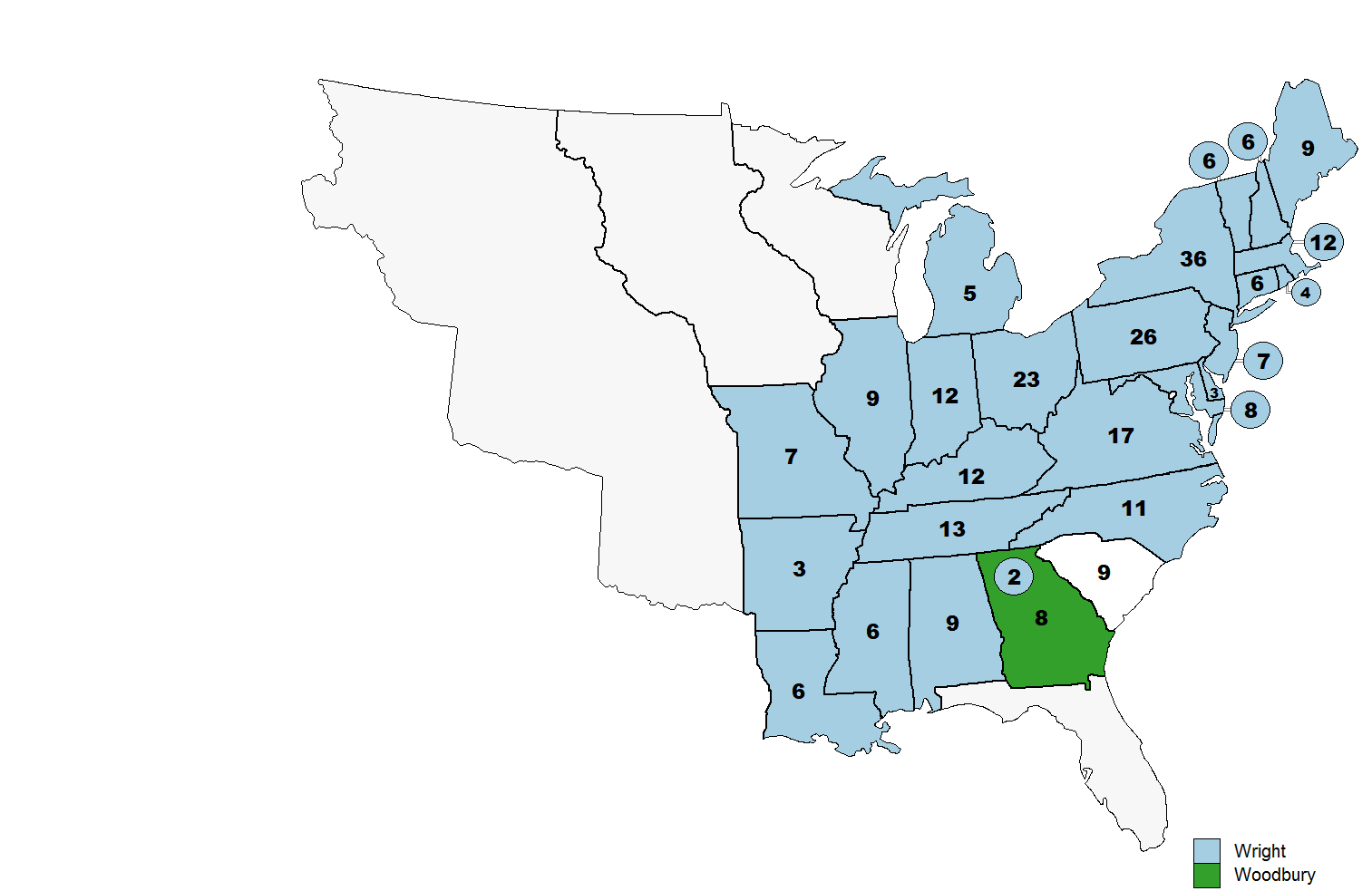
1st Vice Presidential Ballot

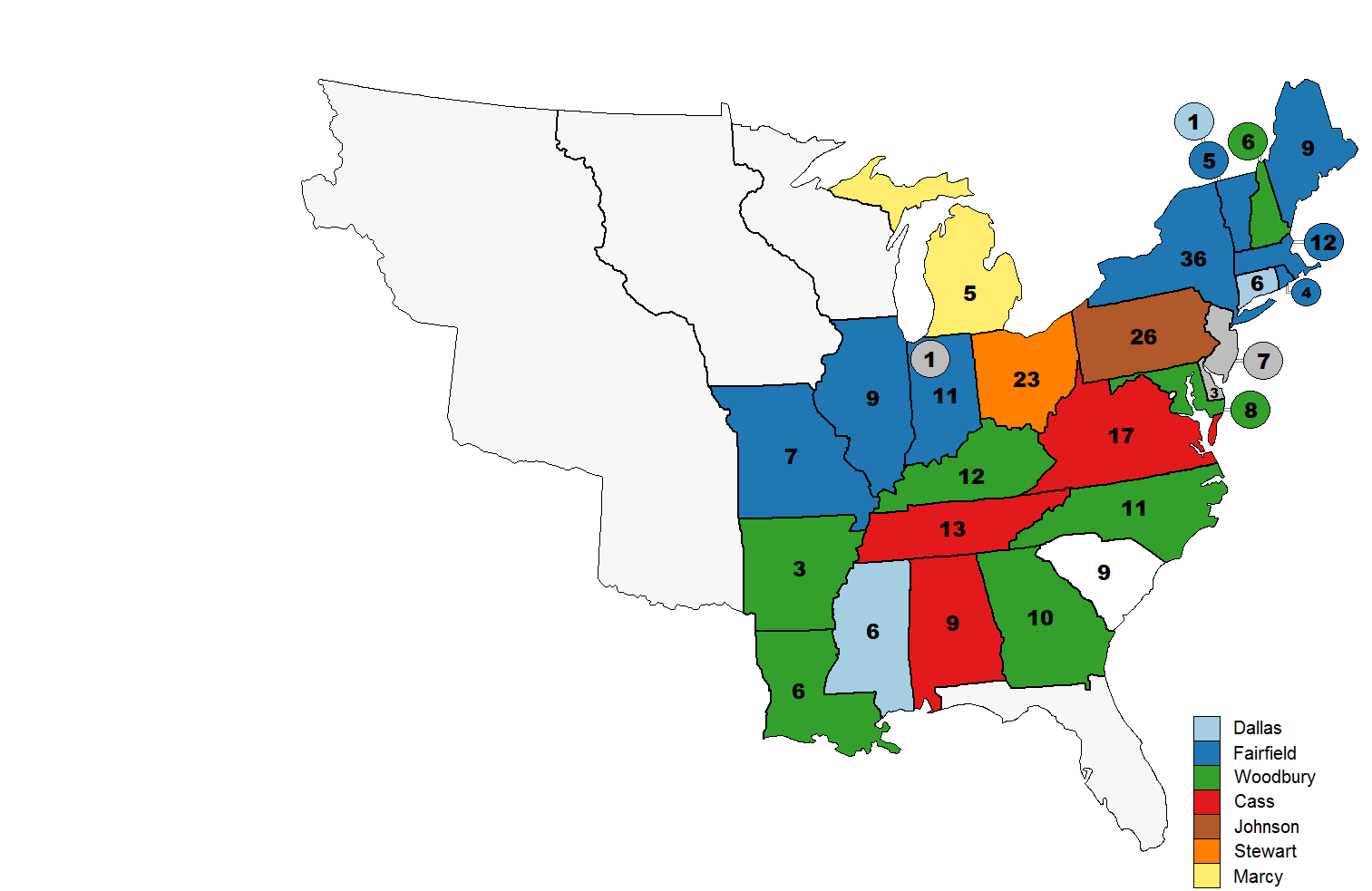
2nd Vice Presidential Ballot

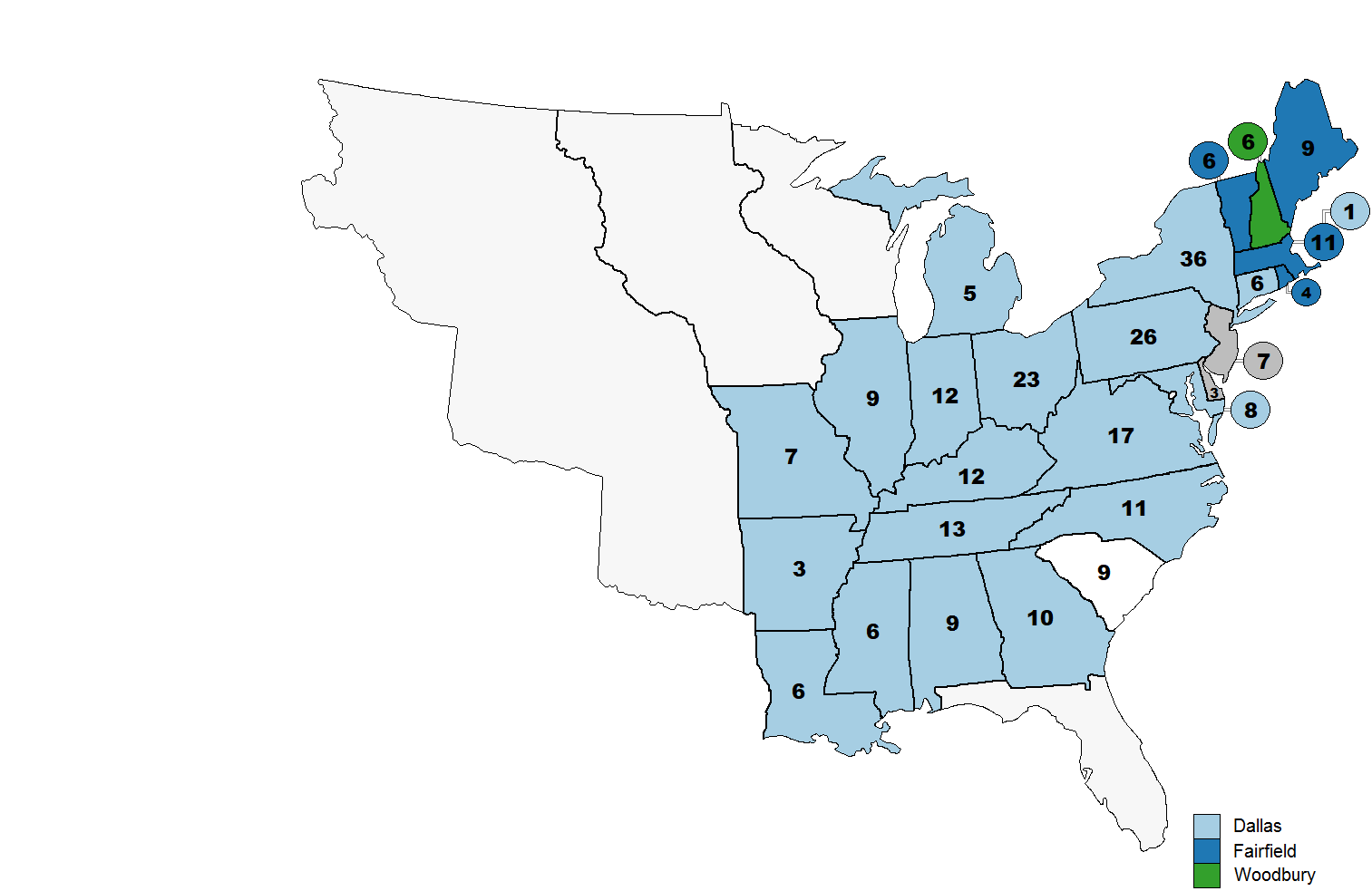
3rd Vice Presidential Ballot

== In popular culture ==
The basic events of the convention are outlined in the song "James K. Polk" by the rock band They Might Be Giants.

== See also ==
- History of the United States Democratic Party
- 1844 Whig National Convention
- 1844 United States presidential election
- U.S. presidential nomination convention
- List of Democratic National Conventions

Preceded by 1840; Baltimore, Maryland	Democratic National Conventions	Succeeded by 1848; Baltimore, Maryland
