= Smart Songs =

- Founded: 2008
- Founders: Shoeless Jeff, Scott Free
- Country of origin: United States
- Headquarters location: Los Angeles, CA
- Distribution: Social Studies School Service
- Nonfiction topics: US History, Social Studies, Economics
- Official website: www.smartsongs.org

Smart Songs is an educational music group founded in 2008 by Shoeless Jeff (Jeff DuJardin) and Scott Free (Scott Geer). According to the group’s website www.SmartSongs.org, the mission of Smart Songs is to “provide kids and teachers with fun and educational hip hop that makes learning fun.” Media sources ABC News Los Angeles (KABC-TV) and BostonInno.com have described the group as the current version of Schoolhouse Rock. Album DVDs Trip to DC and Trip to Wall Street are currently distributed through Social Studies School Service.

== Origins ==
Shoeless Jeff and Scott Free met each other while playing baseball for the Babe Ruth League in Providence, Rhode Island at age 13, while Jeff was playing shortstop and Scott was on second base. In high school, Jeff began writing educational raps for extra credit in his classes while he and Scott worked on non-educational hip hop songs. In college together at Providence College, Jeff and Scott helped form a live hip hop band called Capitol Hill that toured the East Coast. While on tour, the group visited an inner-city school in Dorchester, MA and realized their style of music fit well with students and decided to launch Smart Songs.

== Albums ==
In 2011, Smart Songs released a remixed and remastered version of its album Trip to DC (originally released in 2008), which explains several topics in United States Social Studies and History. Smart Songs released its second album Trip to Wall Street in 2013, which explains the economy and money management.

== Distribution ==
Album DVDs Trip to DC and Trip to Wall Street are currently distributed through Social Studies School Service. In 2008, Smart Songs’ music was distributed through Highlights for Children, which is the largest children's magazine in the world with over 2 million subscribers. In 2010, Teachers Discovery began distributing Smart Songs’ new version of Trip to DC through its website and catalog.

== Publicity ==
In January 2011, Smart Songs was interviewed by Harvard University’s School of Education for a university podcast. This podcast also appeared on The Huffington Post. In October 2011, Smart Songs appeared on ABC News Los Angeles. Other interviews include: March 2012 - The Boston Globe (Boston.com) January 2012 – Boston Inno March 2009 – Bay State Banner October 2008 – The Providence Journal October 2008 – Fox Channel 12 Providence
