= Odd Fellows Hall (Baltimore, 1831) =

Former meeting hall of the Independent Order of Odd Fellows in Baltimore

Coordinates: 39°17′28.7″N 76°36′33.2″W

The Odd Fellows Hall in Baltimore, Maryland, United States was a building that was the meeting place of the Independent Order of Odd Fellows fraternal organization, as well as the organization's national headquarters, from 1831 until 1890. It was the first Odd Fellows' Hall in the United States.

== Construction ==
In 1819, the first United States lodge of the Independent Order of Odd Fellows was established in Baltimore at the Seven Stars Tavern. The organization grew rapidly and on January 15, 1830, the Grand Lodge of Maryland unanimously resolved to "procur[e] a suitable lot of ground, in some central part of the city...to build an Odd Fellow's hall". Soon thereafter, the trustees of the Grand Lodge purchased a plot of land on North Gay Street in Baltimore. The original plan, which called for the construction of the hall to be funded by the subordinate lodges, was not successful and James L. Ridgely, secretary of the Grand Lodge, successfully maneuvered to abandon this plan and replace with one that would call for the hall to be built solely by the Grand Lodge. A building committee was established and, after many unsuccessful efforts, was able to gain the necessary funds through canvassing of Lodge members and private credit.

== Dedication ==
The Odd Fellows' Hall was dedicated on April 26, 1831. A procession was formed at the Exchange Building and marched to Trinity Church, where an oration was delivered by Ridgely and a choir performed a musical selection. The procession then marched to the hall, where the dedication ceremony took place and Thomas Yates Walsh made a speech. The number of the persons in the procession was reported to be over 500.

== Building ==
Soon after it was built, the hall was described as a "new and handsome brick house". The first floor housed an extensive library and a reading room. The upper floor housed a grand ballroom known as the Egyptian Saloon. It was decorated with depictions of ancient Egyptian culture, including hieroglyphics, pharaohs, and the Nile River.

== Notable events ==
In January 1844, Edgar Allan Poe lectured on American poetry at the hall. During his lecture, Poe was "witheringly severe" about Rufus Griswold, who had published an article that attacked Poe's work.

In 1844, the Egyptian Saloon was the largest meeting room in Baltimore and as such it was chosen to be the venue of that year's Democratic national convention. The room was a poor choice for the convention, as it was too small to comfortably fit all of the delegates, politicians, and spectators. As a result, the crowd spilled out onto the street. Furthermore, its acoustics were poor and the spectator gallery was described as being "as black as the hole of Calcutta". During the convention, one delegate moved that the convention to be moved to a larger room in Baltimore, however, the organizing committee responded that there was not a larger room in the city.

== Addition ==
The building was enlarged in 1843 and 1847. In 1852, the South Wing (also known as the Tower Building) was added. The wing, which was in the Tudor Gothic style, fronted 30 feet on North Gay Street and extended 136 feet on Orange Street. The Egyptian Saloon was also remodeled. It was expanded, the windows were enlarged and the walls and ceilings were replastered to make the room brighter and better ventilated, and the ceiling was raised several feet.

== Demolition ==
By 1889, the Odd Fellows had outgrown the hall. A site at Cathedral and Saratoga Streets was purchased for $42,300 and architect Frank E. Davis was commissioned to design a new hall. In 1890, the Odd Fellows moved their national headquarters from the hall and the building was demolished so that Lexington Street could extended from Holliday to Gay Street. This created what is now City Hall Plaza. Baltimore's new Odd Fellows Hall was completed the following year.
