= Alex Kajitani =

American middle school math teacher

Alex Kajitani is an American middle school math teacher who was the 2009 California State Teacher of the Year. He is the founder of Multiplication Nation, and is best known for creating widely used math rap songs as the "Rappin' Mathematician". He is the author of Owning It (2014) and has delivered a TEDx talk on inspiring students. He has been featured on Katie Couric's CBS News.
