= List of ghost towns in Idaho =

The following is a list of ghost towns in Idaho. A ghost town is an abandoned village, town or city, usually one which contains substantial visible remains. A town often becomes a ghost town because the economic activity that supported it has failed, or due to natural or human-caused disasters such as floods, government actions or uncontrolled lawlessness.

== Classification ==
=== Barren site ===
- Sites no longer in existence
- Sites that have been destroyed
- Covered with water
- Reverted to pasture
- May have a few difficult to find foundations/footings at most

=== Neglected site ===
- Only rubble left
- Roofless building ruins
- Buildings or houses still standing, but majority are roofless

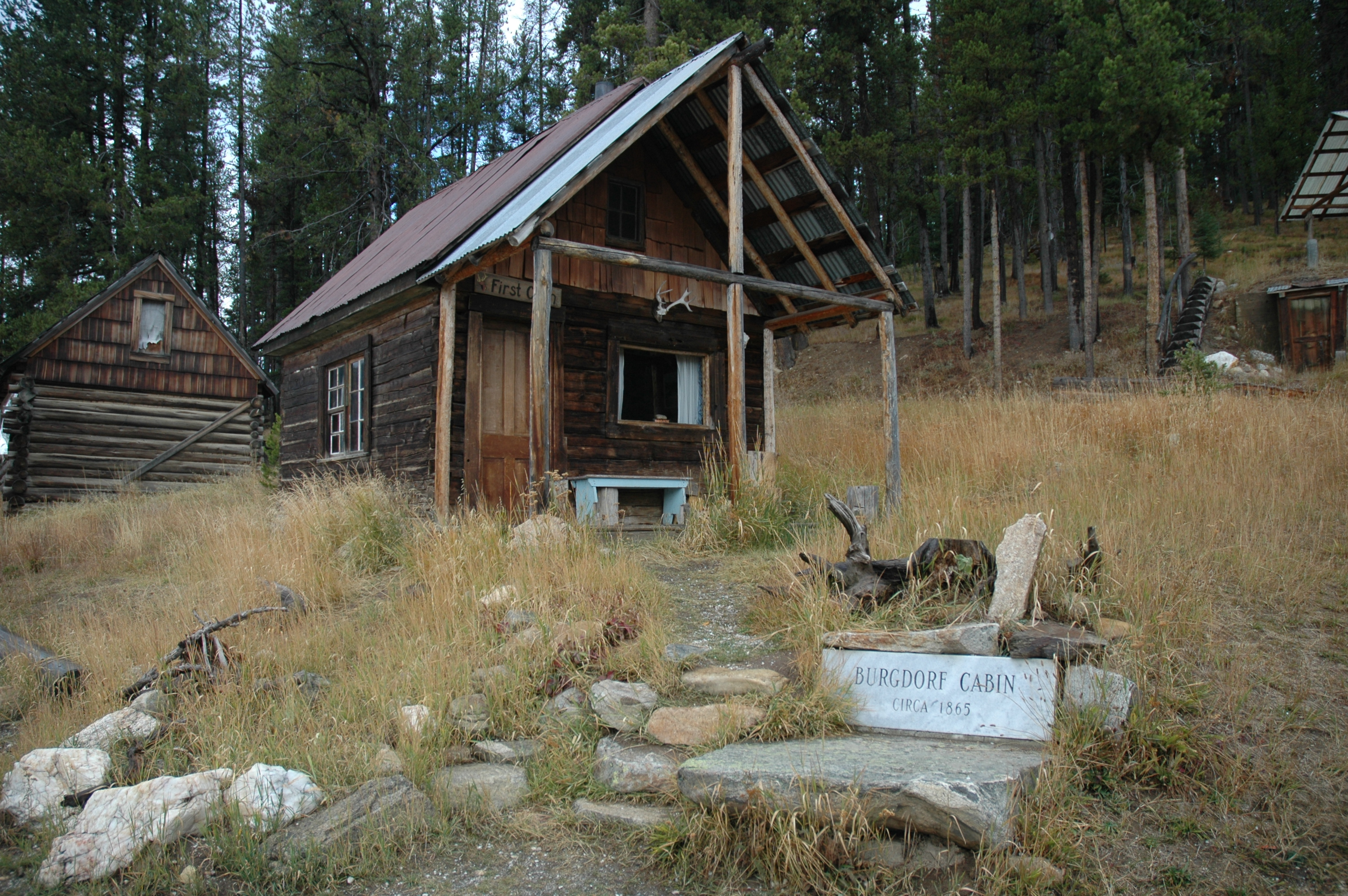
Despite multiple reconstruction attempts, Burgdorf is still abandoned.

=== Abandoned site ===
- Building or houses still standing
- Buildings and houses all abandoned
- No population, except caretaker
- Site no longer in existence except for one or two buildings, for example old church, grocery store

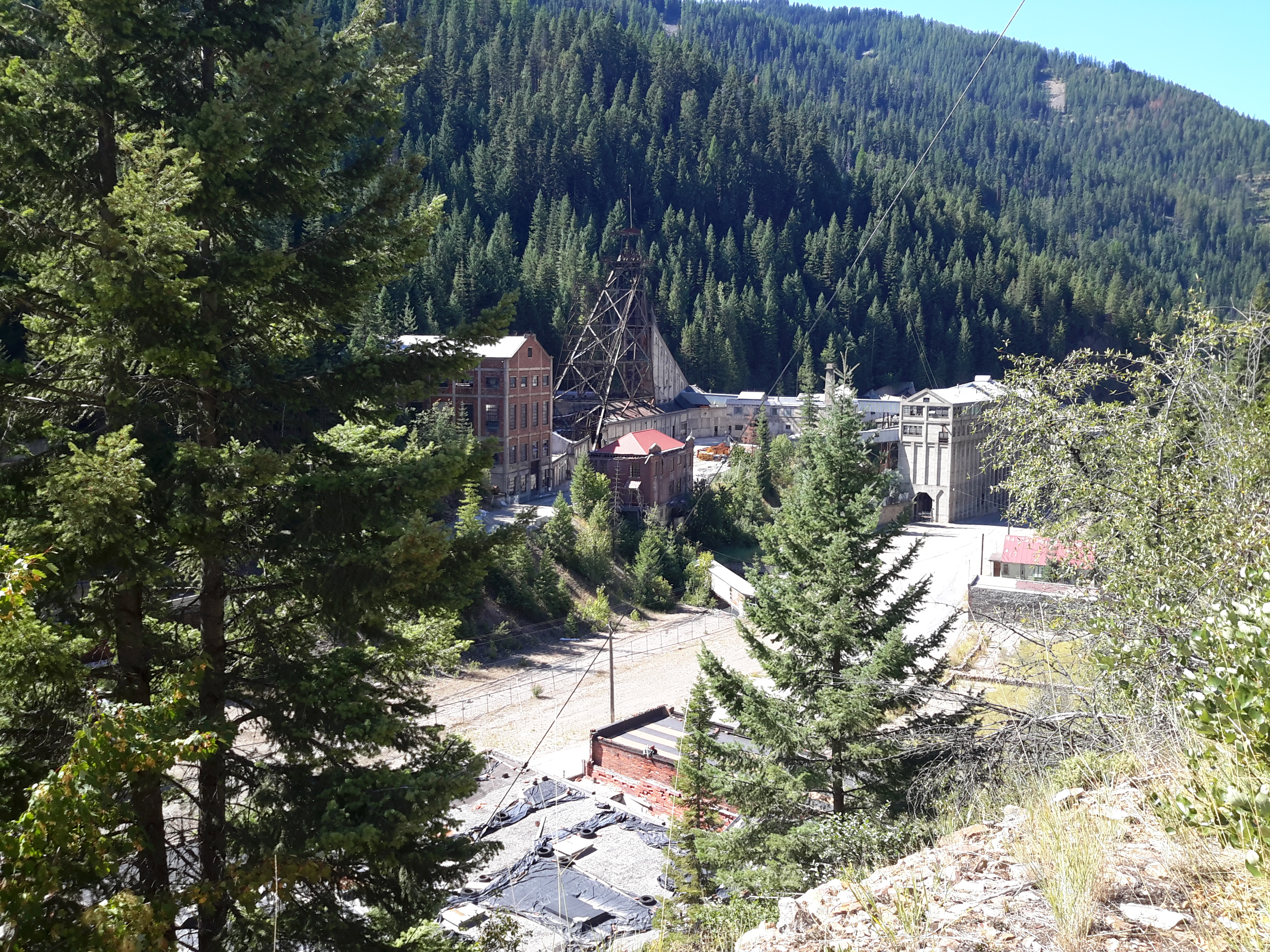
Burke had 15 residents in 1990.

=== Semi-abandoned site ===
- Building or houses still standing
- Buildings and houses largely abandoned
- Few residents
- Many abandoned buildings
- Small population

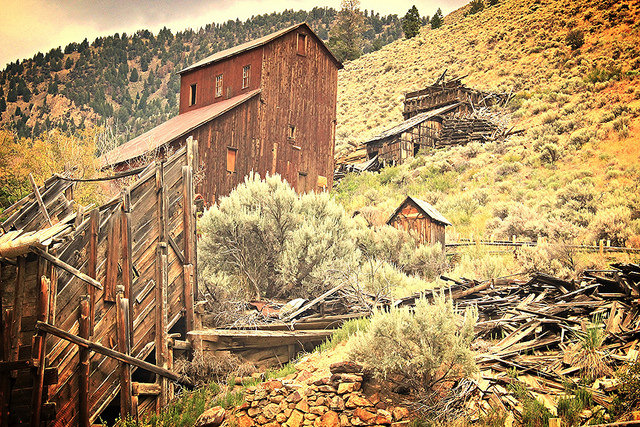
Bayhorse is owned and preserved by the state.

=== Historic community ===
- Building or houses still standing
- Still a busy community
- Smaller than its boom years
- Population has decreased dramatically, to one fifth or less.

== Table ==
Name	Other names	County	Location	Settled	Abandoned	Current status	Remarks
Aline		Teton		1888	1901		First settlement of Latter-Day Saints in the area.
Bayhorse		Custer		1877	1897	Historic	A former mining town turned state park
Bonanza	Bonanza City	Custer		1877		Abandoned	
Burgdorf		Idaho		1860s	Before 1945	Semi-abandoned	
Burke		Shoshone		1887	1991	Semi-abandoned	A mining town that closed after several natural disasters.
Caribou City				1897	1930		
Chesterfield		Caribou		1879	After 1928		A former Mormon settlement, now open to the public as a tourist attraction.
Cobalt		Lemhi			1950s		
Comeback Mining Camp				1862			
Copper Queen							
Custer		Custer		1879	1910		
De Lamar		Owyhee		1888			
Florence		Idaho		1861	sometime after 1951.		
Gilmore		Lemhi		1902	1930s		
Golden Age Camp							
Joseph		Idaho		1883	1887		
Joseph Plains		Idaho					
Leesburg		Lemhi		July 16, 1866	by the end of World War II		
Mount Idaho		Idaho		1892	1922		
Placerville		Boise		1862	1899		
Rocky Bar		Elmore		December 1863	1960s		
Ruby City		Owyhee		November 1863			
Sawtooth City		Blaine		1879	1888		
Silver City		Owyhee		March 10, 1863	1890		
Strevell		Cassia			1974		
Vienna				1878	1879		
White Knob		Custer		1884	1928		
Yellow Jacket				1943	1945		

== 1897 Gallery ==
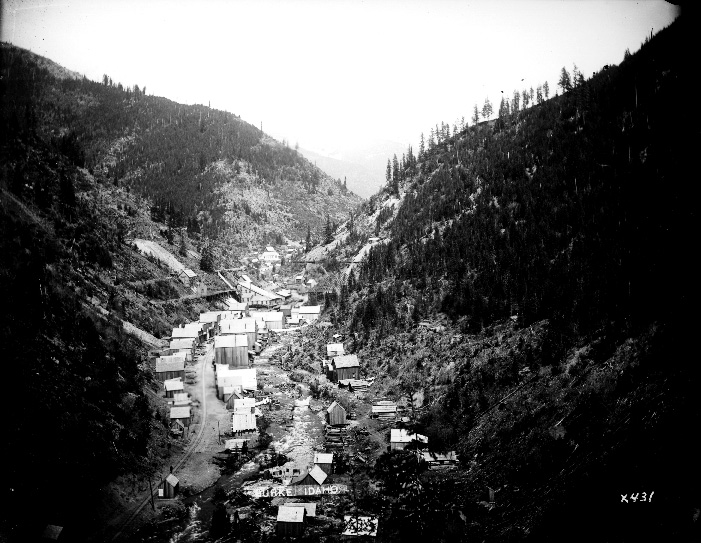
Burke in 1888

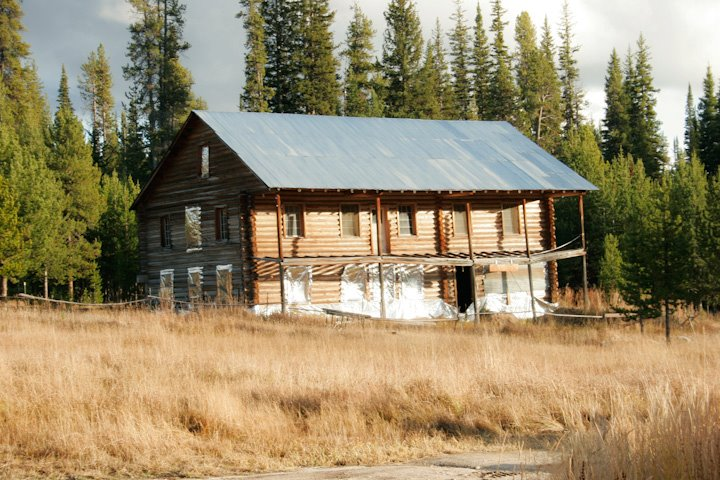
The former hotel in Burgdorf

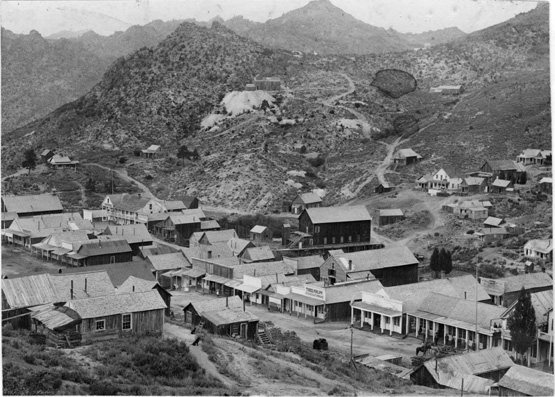
Silver City in 1892

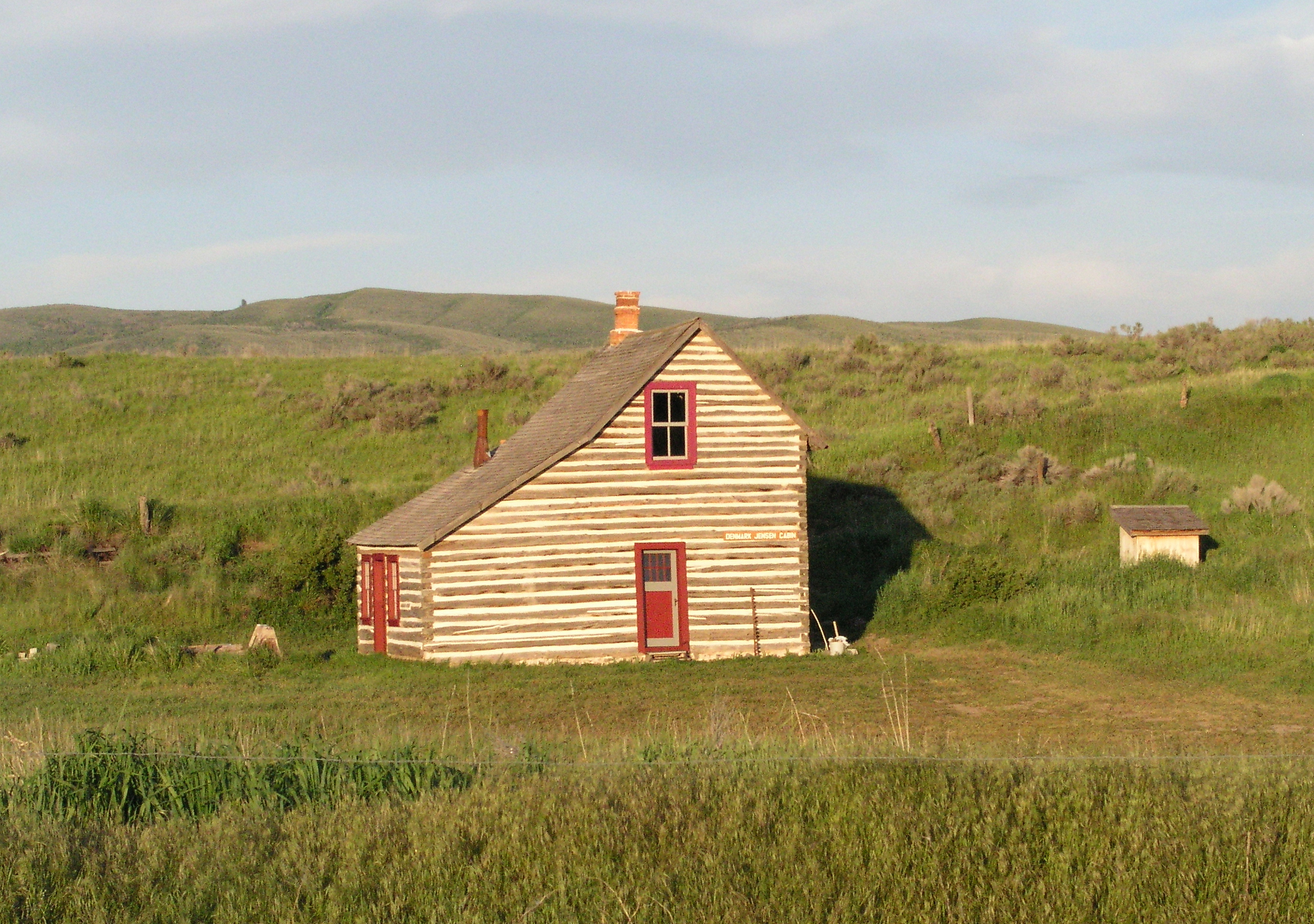
A preserved cabin in Chesterfield

== See also ==
- List of counties in Idaho
