= List of National Historic Sites of Canada in Yukon =

This is a list of National Historic Sites (French: Lieux historiques nationaux) in the territory of Yukon. There are 12 National Historic Sites designated in Yukon, four of which are in the national park system, administered by Parks Canada (identified below by the beaver icon).

Several National Historic Events also occurred in Yukon, and are identified at places associated with them, using the same style of federal plaque which marks National Historic Sites. National Historic Persons are commemorated in the same way. The markers do not indicate which designation—a Site, Event, or Person—a subject has been given.

This list uses names designated by the national Historic Sites and Monuments Board, which may differ from other names for these sites.

* Tr'ondëk-Klondike World Heritage Site unit

== National Historic Sites ==
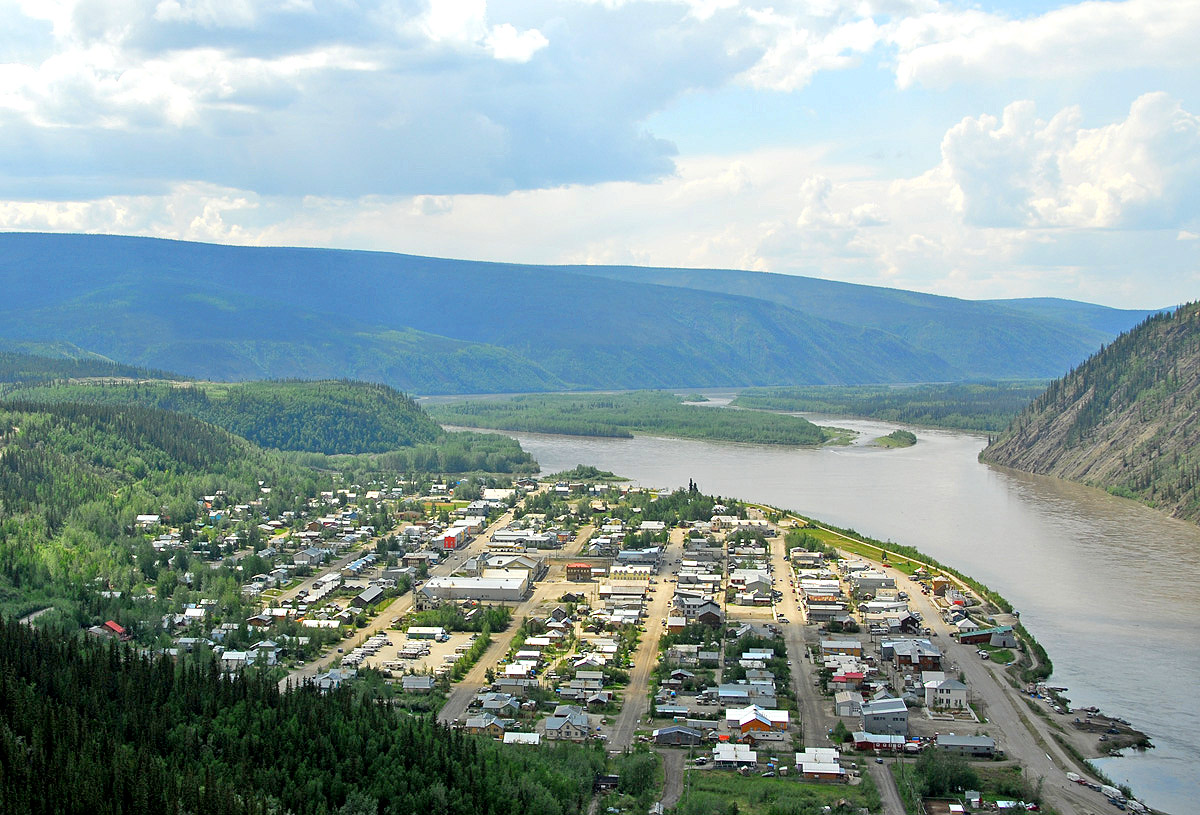
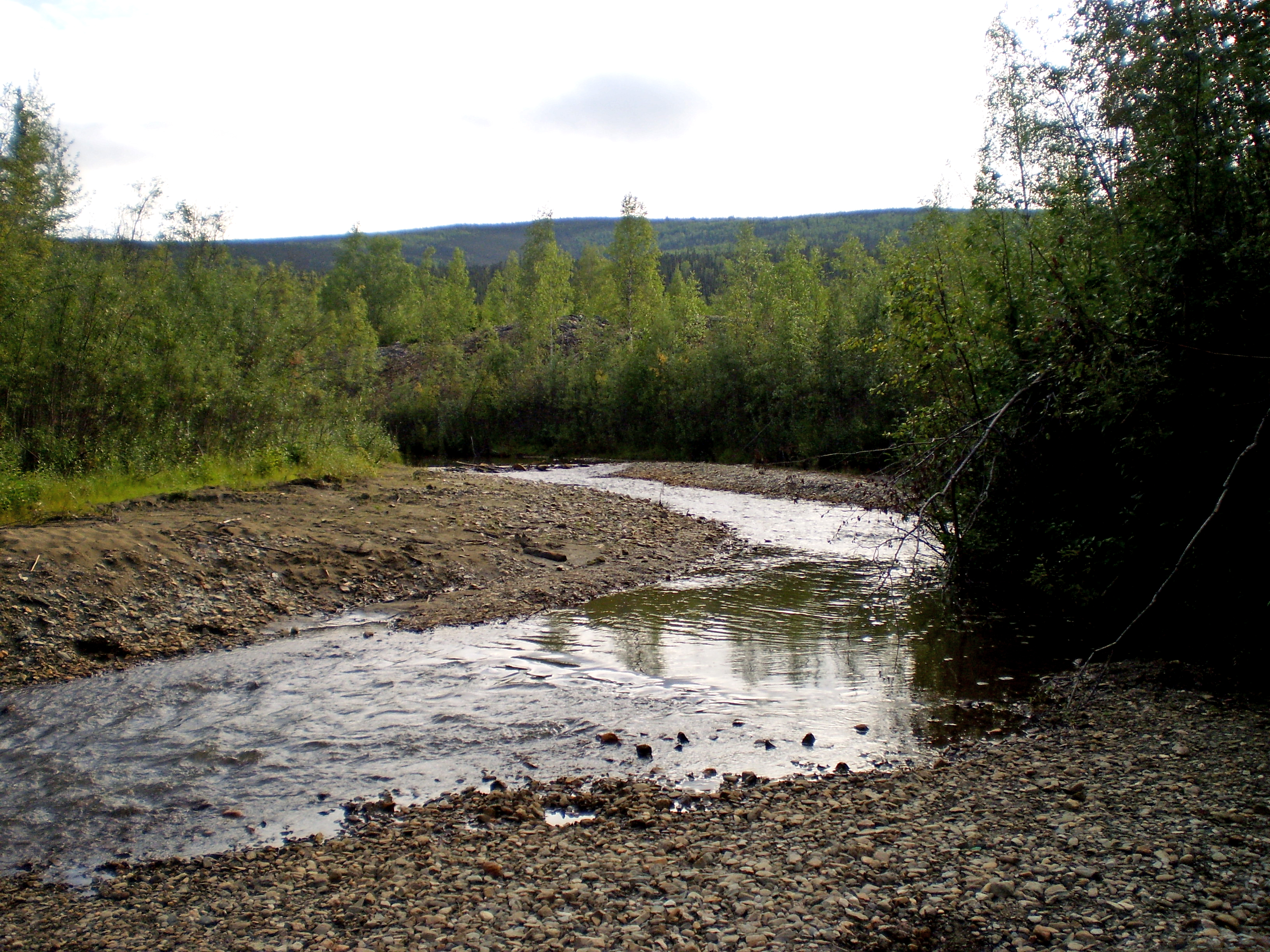
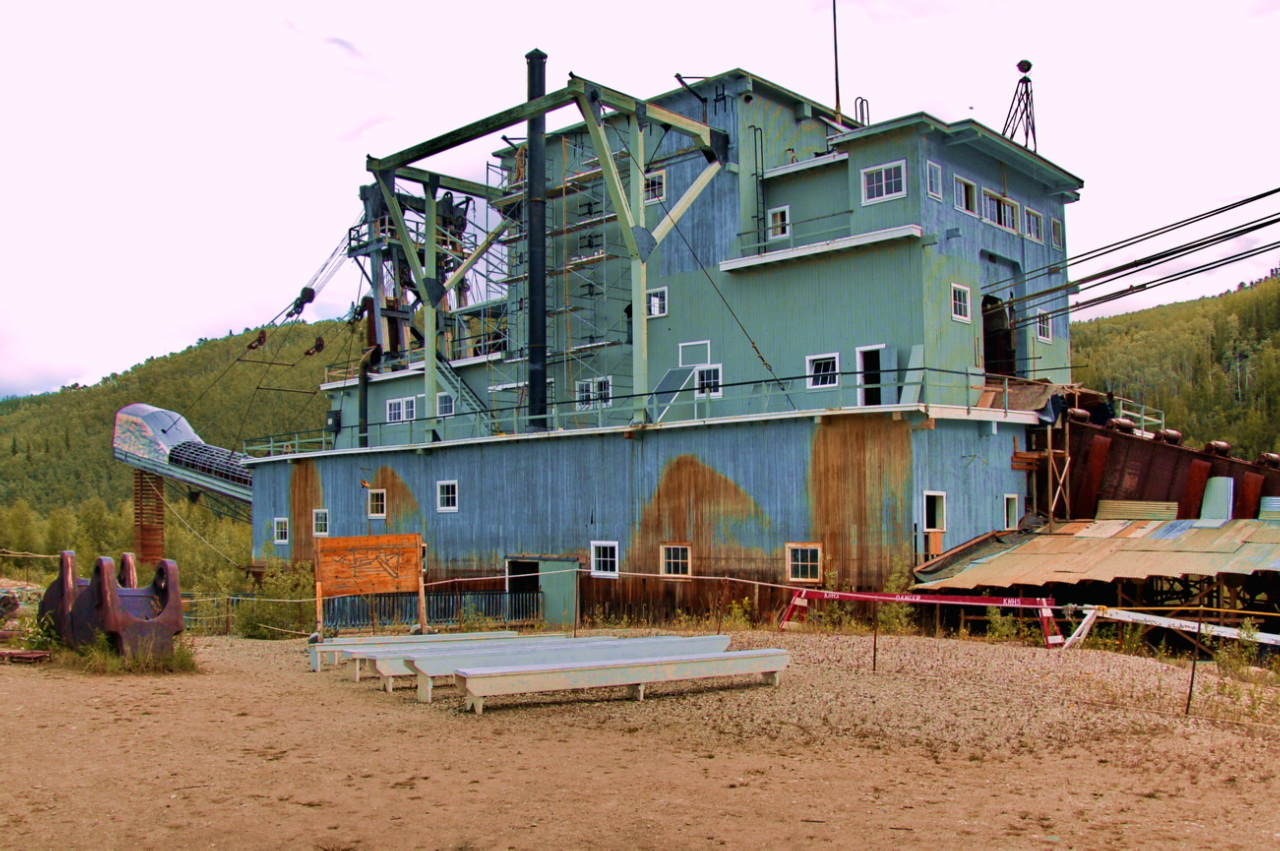
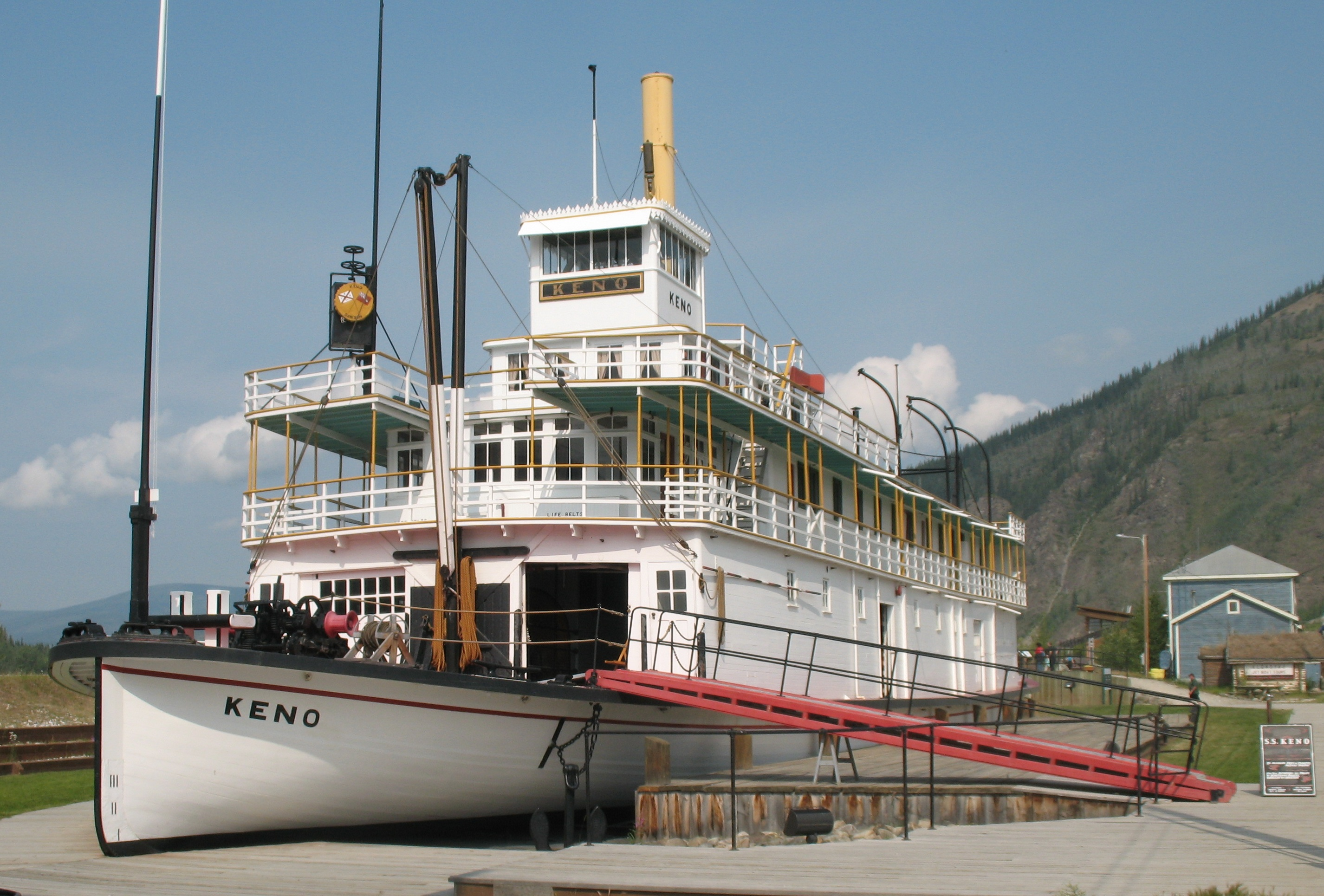
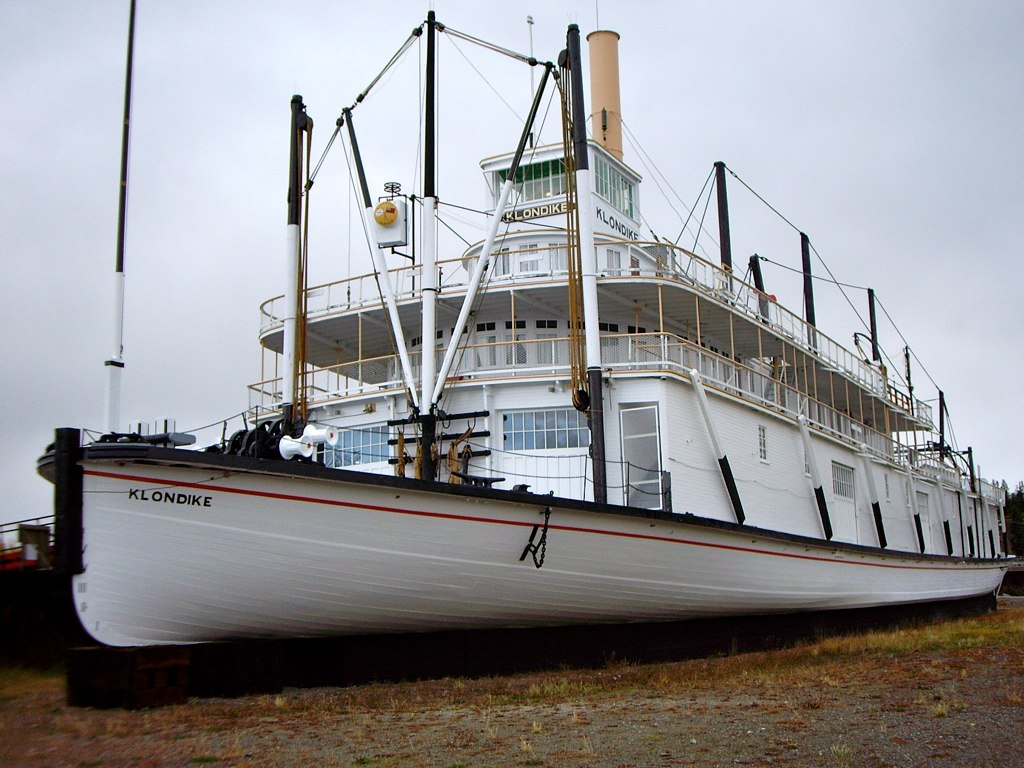
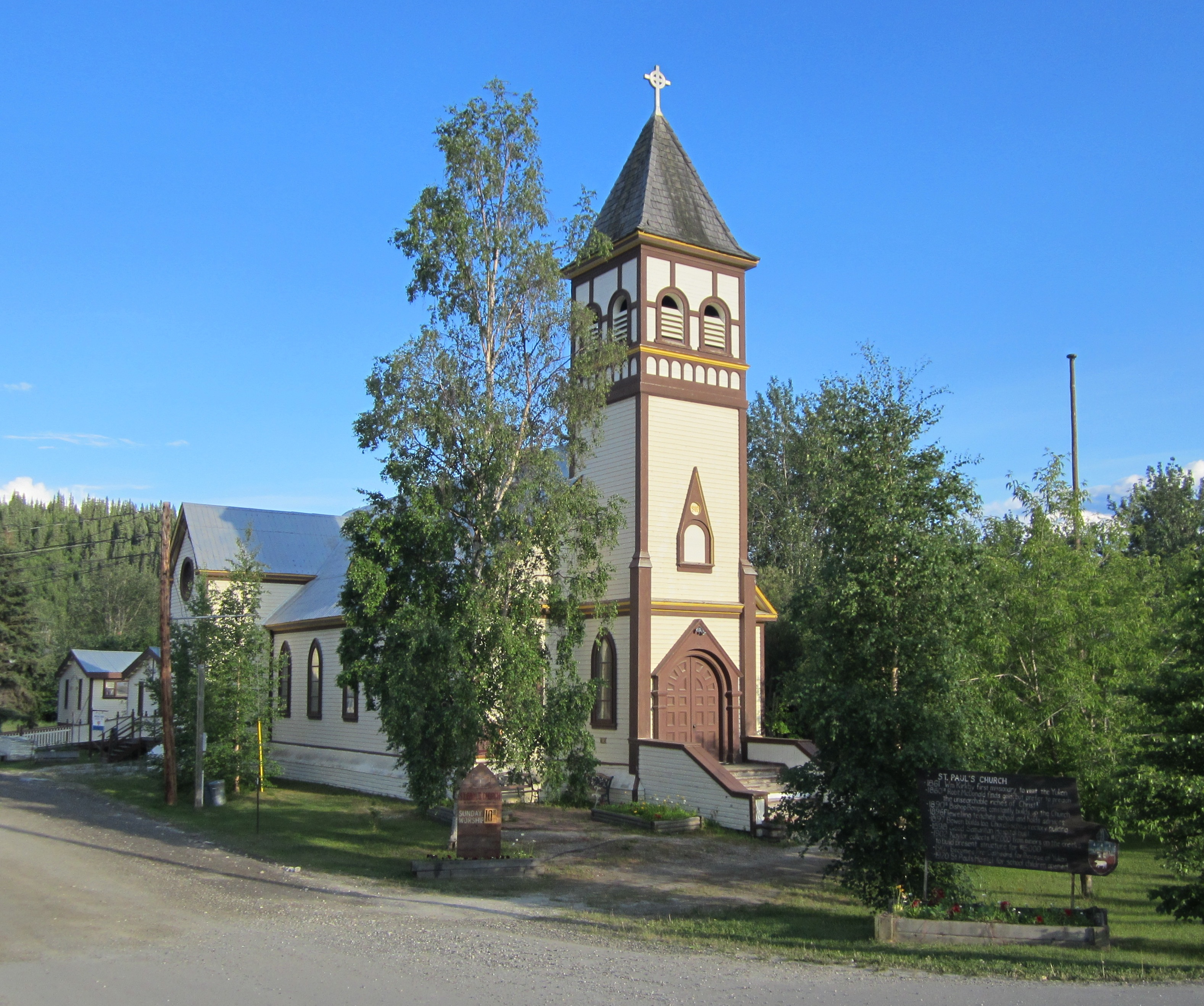
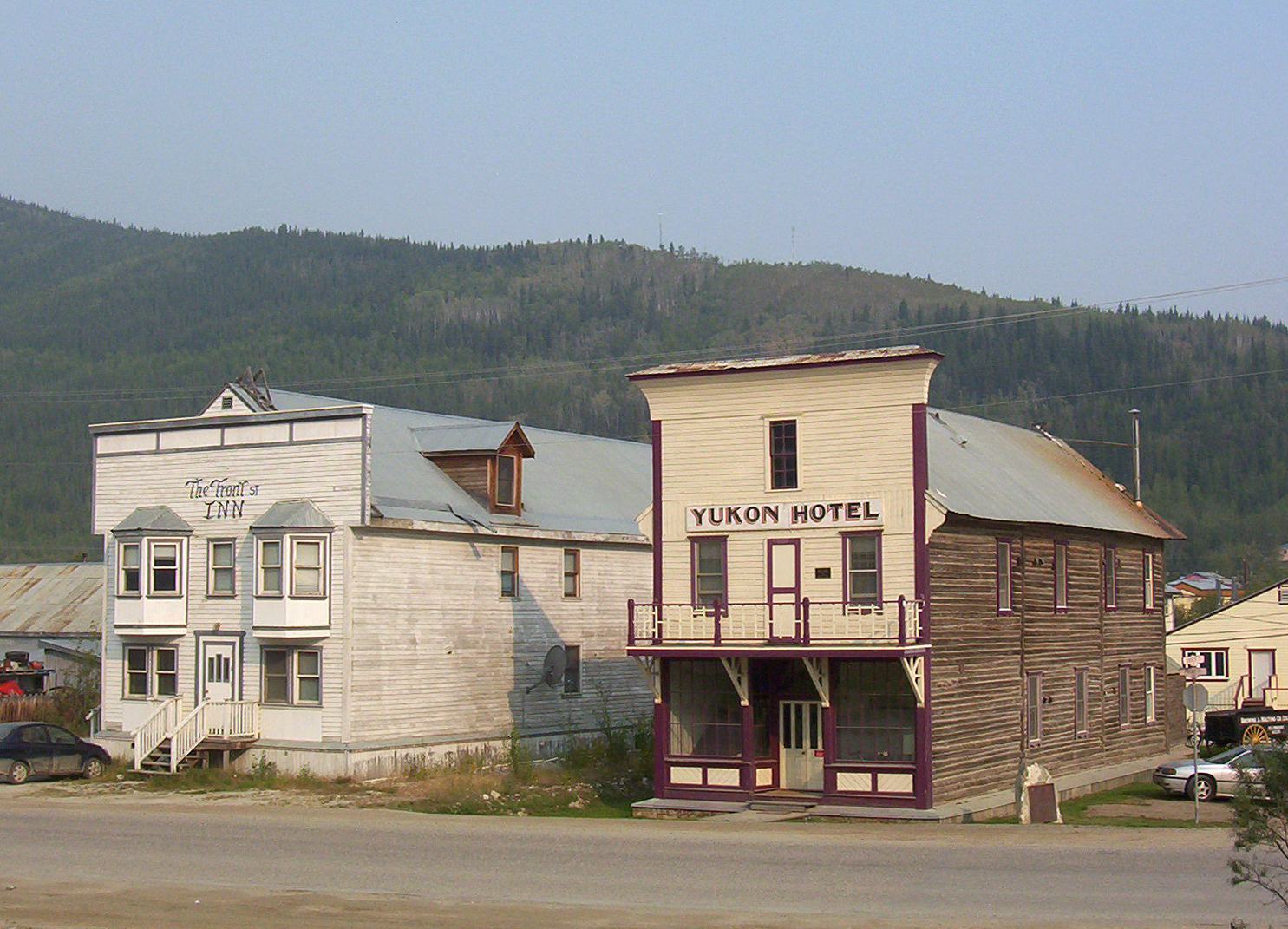
Site	Date(s)	Designated	Location	Description	Image
Canadian Bank of Commerce *	1901 (completed)	1988	Dawson City; 64°3′46″N 139°26′8″W	Bank building is one of the finest surviving structures in Canada clad in decorative pressed metal; bank played an important role in Yukon history, commencing during the Klondike Gold Rush
Dawson Historical Complex *	1896 (beginning of gold rush)	1959	Dawson City; 64°3′47.58″N 139°25′49.04″W	The historic core of Dawson City, a town established during the Klondike Gold Rush; a wide range and concentration of frontier structures related to the town’s early nature, northern isolation, and links to mining activities
Discovery Claim (Claim 37903)	1896 (discovery)	1998	Bonanza Creek; 63°54′59″N 139°18′59″W	A mining claim on Bonanza Creek where the Klondike Gold Rush began; its discovery marked the beginning of the development of the Yukon
Dredge No. 4	1913 (completed), 1941 (moved to Bonanza Creek)	1997	Bonanza Creek; 63°56′36.48″N 139°20′5.43″W	A preserved bucketline sluice dredge used to mine placer gold; symbolizes the importance of dredging operations to the evolution of gold mining in the Klondike
Former Territorial Court House *	1901 (completed)	1981 (removed from the national park system Aug. 21, 2024; transferred to Yukon)	Dawson City; 64°3′22.63″N 139°26′24.06″W	Built to replace the original log courthouse, the construction of this courthouse symbolized the Canadian government’s determination to establish and maintain law and order in Dawson
Old Territorial Administration Building *	1901 (completed)	2001	Dawson City; 64°3′32″N 139°26′11″W	A building constructed in 1901 as the legislative and administrative headquarters of the new Yukon Territory; symbolizes the establishment of links between the territories "north of sixty" and Canadian society in the south
S.S. Keno *	1922 (launched)	1962	Dawson City; 64°3′47.5″N 139°26′4.15″W	A steam-powered sternwheeler river vessel which rests on the bank of the Yukon River; representative of lake and river sternwheeler steamers used in the Yukon
S.S. Klondike	1937 (launched)	1967	Whitehorse; 60.71339°N 135.04839°W	A large paddle steamer dry-docked on the bank of the Yukon River; the largest and last of the Yukon commercial steamboats
St. Paul's Anglican Church *	1902 (completed)	1989	Dawson City; 64°3′31″N 139°26′17″W	A significant example of the architecture of frontier missions in Canada; a simple church with Gothic Revival and Arts and Crafts elements
T'äw Tà'är		2012	Teslin River; 61°14′34″N 134°36′50″W	A 14.6-hectare (36-acre) site at the confluence of the Teslin River and Hutamya Chù creek; an aboriginal cultural landscape related to the historic food gathering, travel and trade activities of the Southern Tutchone people of Ta’an Kwäch’än
Tr'ochëk *		2002	Dawson City; 64°2′59″N 139°26′25″W	Flats at the confluence of the Yukon and Klondike Rivers containing the remains of Hän fish camps, traditional plant harvesting areas and lookout points
Yukon Hotel	1898 (completed)	1982	Dawson City; 64°3′33″N 139°26′18″W	A small wooden false-front building typical of commercial structures built at the height of the Klondike Gold Rush

== See also ==
- History of Yukon
- List of historic places in Yukon
