= List of historic places in Yukon =

This article is a list of historic places in Yukon entered on the Canadian Register of Historic Places or the Yukon Register of Historic Places. In Canada, historic places are formally recognized for their heritage value by a federal, provincial, territorial or municipal authority.

== List of historic places ==
Name	Address	Coordinates	Government recognition (CRHP №)	Wikidata ID	Image
Discovery Claim (Claim 37903) National Historic Site	Claim No. 37903; Bonanza Creek YT	63°55′00″N 139°19′01″W	Federal (6310)	Q20725626	More images
Dredge No. 4 National Historic Site	Lot 586, group 1052; Bonanza Creek YT	63°56′38″N 139°20′10″W	Federal (6280)	Q22975473	More images
Caribou Hotel	Dawson Charlie Street; Carcross YT	60°09′55″N 134°42′22″W	Yukon (9834)	Q132816820	More images
White Pass and Yukon Railway Station	Main Street; Carcross YT	60°09′54″N 134°42′18″W	Federal (6723)	Q5038179	More images
St. Paul's Anglican Church National Historic Site	Dawson City YT	64°03′33″N 139°26′20″W	Federal (14122)	Q7591019	More images
S.S. Keno National Historic Site	Dawson City YT	64°03′45″N 139°26′10″W	Federal (9308)	Q7393921	More images
Lowe's Mortuary	Dawson City YT	64°03′45″N 139°25′55″W	Federal (9692)	Q61499682	More images
Bank of British North America	Queen Street; Dawson City YT	64°03′44″N 139°26′02″W	Federal (11263)	Q61499699	More images
BYN Ticket Office	Dawson City YT	64°03′49″N 139°26′02″W	Federal (9704)	Q61499674	More images
Canadian Bank of Commerce National Historic Site of Canada	Front and Queen Streets; Dawson City YT	64°03′46″N 139°26′07″W	Federal (15524)	Q22975460	More images
KTM Building	Dawson City YT	64°03′40″N 139°25′56″W	Federal (11425)	Q61499659	Upload Photo
NWMP Married Quarters	Dawson City YT	64°03′25″N 139°26′17″W	Federal (9824)	Q61499693	Upload Photo
Mme. Tremblay’s Store (16)	Dawson City YT	64°03′46″N 139°25′44″W	Federal (9826)	Q61499756	More images
Harrington’s Store (15)	Dawson City YT	64°03′38″N 139°26′02″W	Federal (9829)	Q61499677	More images
North West Mounted Police Stables	Dawson City YT	64°03′26″N 139°26′17″W	Federal (9842)	Q61499665	Upload Photo
North West Mounted Police Jail	Dawson City YT	64°03′25″N 139°26′13″W	Federal (9854)	Q61499746	Upload Photo
Northern Commercial Company Warehouse	Dawson City YT	64°03′42″N 139°25′37″W	Federal (10373)	Q61499662	Upload Photo
Root Cellar	Dawson City YT	64°01′39″N 139°14′46″W	Federal (11208)	Q61499716	Upload Photo
General Manager's House	Dawson City YT	64°01′39″N 139°14′35″W	Federal (11213)	Q61499733	Upload Photo
Tr'ochëk National Historic Site	Dawson City YT	64°03′04″N 139°26′28″W	Federal (14661)	Q2457306	More images
Dawson Daily News	123 3rd Avenue; Dawson City YT	64°03′43″N 139°25′55″W	Federal (11264)	Q61499759	More images
Yukon Sawmill Company Office	1302 Front Street; Dawson City YT	64°03′57″N 139°25′48″W	Yukon (4832)	Q105948221	More images
Ruby's Place	233 Second Avenue; Dawson City YT	64°03′41″N 139°26′02″W	Federal (10372)	Q61499667	More images
Third Avenue Hotel, Building 14	309-11 Third Avenue; Dawson City YT	64°03′45″N 139°25′52″W	Federal (6227)	Q61499678	More images
Commanding Officer's Residence (10)	508 Fifth Avenue; Dawson City YT	64°03′17″N 139°26′17″W	Federal (9825)	Q61499675	Upload Photo
Dawson City Telegraph Office	512 Seventh Avenue; Dawson City YT	64°03′21″N 139°25′59″W	Yukon (3920)	Q104536850	More images
Old Territorial Administration Building National Historic Site	595 Fifth Avenue; Dawson City YT	64°03′21″N 139°26′13″W	Federal (15784)	Q22975456	More images
St. Andrew's Manse	601 Fourth Avenue; Dawson City YT	64°03′45″N 139°25′52″W	Federal (10364)	Q61499679	Upload Photo
Auto Repair Shop, Building #7	Bear Creek Compound; Dawson City YT	64°01′37″N 139°14′35″W	Federal (6232)	Q61499684	Upload Photo
Carpentry Shop, Building #6	Bear Creek Compound; Dawson City YT	64°01′36″N 139°14′36″W	Federal (6235)	Q61499701	Upload Photo
Cat Repair Shop, Building #8	Bear Creek Compound; Dawson City YT	64°01′37″N 139°14′34″W	Federal (6242)	Q61499696	Upload Photo
Garage and Fire Hall	Bear Creek Compound; Dawson City YT	64°01′39″N 139°14′33″W	Federal (11215)	Q61499686	Upload Photo
Garage and Storage Building	Bear Creek Compound; Dawson City YT	64°01′39″N 139°14′32″W	Federal (11227)	Q61499657	Upload Photo
Gas House	Bear Creek Compound; Dawson City YT	64°01′35″N 139°14′33″W	Federal (10778)	Q61499707	Upload Photo
Mess Hall and Bunkhouse	Bear Creek Compound; Dawson City YT	64°01′41″N 139°14′38″W	Federal (11210)	Q61499712	Upload Photo
Staff House	Bear Creek Compound; Dawson City YT	64°01′37″N 139°14′31″W	Federal (11112)	Q61499717	Upload Photo
Tin Shop	Bear Creek Compound; Dawson City YT	64°01′36″N 139°14′35″W	Federal (9882)	Q61499720	Upload Photo
Troberg Residence, Building #67	Bear Creek Compound; Dawson City YT	64°01′48″N 139°14′16″W	Federal (9890)	Q61499722	Upload Photo
V.I.P. Guest House	Bear Creek Compound; Dawson City YT	64°01′38″N 139°14′30″W	Federal (9922)	Q61499726	Upload Photo
Warehouse No. 1, Building #27	Bear Creek Compound; Dawson City YT	64°01′38″N 139°14′40″W	Federal (9923)	Q61499729	Upload Photo
Warehouse No. 2	Bear Creek Compound; Dawson City YT	64°00′N 139°14′W	Federal (10819)	Q61499687	Upload Photo
Warehouse No. 3, Building #35	Bear Creek Compound; Dawson City YT	64°01′38″N 139°14′45″W	Federal (9924)	Q61499671	Upload Photo
Engineering Office (Building 19)	Bear Creek Compound; Dawson City YT	64°01′40″N 139°14′37″W	Federal (9925)	Q61499704	Upload Photo
Engineering Office (Building 28)	Bear Creek Compound; Dawson City YT	64°01′38″N 139°14′41″W	Federal (9926)	Q61499890	Upload Photo
Gold Room. Building #29	Bear Creek Compound; Dawson City YT	64°01′39″N 139°14′44″W	Federal (11214)	Q61499710	Upload Photo
Machine Shop, Building #1 & #2	Bear Creek Compound; Dawson City YT	64°01′37″N 139°14′38″W	Federal (11226)	Q61499743	Upload Photo
St. Andrew's Presbyterian Church	Church / Fourth Street; Dawson City YT	64°03′45″N 139°25′52″W	Federal (10366)	Q61499663	More images
Former Territorial Court House National Historic Site	Corner of Front and Turner Streets; Dawson City YT	64°03′23″N 139°26′28″W	Federal (12743, (16081)	Q22975459	More images
Robert Service Cabin	Eighth / Hansen Street; Dawson City YT	64°03′45″N 139°25′52″W	Federal (10368)	Q61499750	More images
Black Residence, No. 9	Fifth Avenue and Turner Street; Dawson City YT	64°03′15″N 139°26′17″W	Federal (6226)	Q61499669	Upload Photo
Yukon Hotel National Historic Site	First Avenue; Dawson City YT	64°03′33″N 139°26′17″W	Federal (9163)	Q8060826	More images
Commissioner's Residence	Front Street; Dawson City YT	64°03′24″N 139°26′28″W	Federal (15641)	Q61499655	More images
Post Office	King Street and Third Avenue; Dawson City YT	64°03′47″N 139°25′52″W	Federal (11629)	Q61499660	More images
Winaut's Store	Second Avenue; Dawson City YT	64°03′23″N 139°26′10″W	Federal (6241)	Q61499751	Upload Photo
Dawson Historical Complex National Historic Site	Third Avenue; Dawson City YT	64°03′48″N 139°25′52″W	Federal (6253)	Q22975467	More images
Mabel Mcintyre House	12 Centre Street; Mayo YT	63°35′36″N 135°53′46″W	Yukon (1282)	Q132816830	Upload Photo
Mayo Legion Hall	310 First Ave; Mayo YT	63°35′28″N 135°53′42″W	Yukon (6585)	Q132816869	Upload Photo
SS Klondike National Historic Site	Whitehorse YT	60°42′48″N 135°02′53″W	Federal (9348)	Q7393932	More images
Smith House	3128 Third Ave. Whitehorse LePage Park; Whitehorse YT	60°43′14″N 135°03′19″W	Whitehorse municipality (8903)	Q132816902	More images
Train Crew's House 1	1091 First Ave; Whitehorse YT	60°43′07″N 135°02′56″W	Whitehorse municipality (15133)	Q132816913	More images
Train Crew's House 2	1093 First Avenue; Whitehorse YT	60°43′08″N 135°02′56″W	Whitehorse municipality (15134)	Q132816933	Upload Photo
Old Firehall	1105 First Avenue; Whitehorse YT	60°43′10″N 135°03′00″W	Whitehorse municipality (14867)	Q132816956	More images
White Pass and Yukon Route Railway Depot	1109 First Ave; Whitehorse YT	60°43′12″N 135°03′00″W	Whitehorse municipality (4471)	Q117825828	More images
Building 200	200 Range Road; Whitehorse YT	60°44′17″N 135°05′17″W	Federal (10792)	Q61499688	Upload Photo
Log Skyscrapers	208 Lambert Street; Whitehorse YT	60°43′04″N 135°03′07″W	Whitehorse municipality (1903)	Q132816975	More images
T.C. Richards Building	302 Steele Street; Whitehorse YT	60°43′12″N 135°03′18″W	Whitehorse municipality (4574)	Q132816995	More images
Donnenworth House	3126 Third Avenue; Whitehorse YT	60°43′13″N 135°03′18″W	Whitehorse municipality (6592)	Q132817012	More images
The Taylor House	412 Main Street; Whitehorse YT	60°43′08″N 135°03′29″W	Yukon (4833)	Q132817047	More images
Pioneer Hotel 2	Shipyards Park; Whitehorse YT	60°43′42″N 135°03′18″W	Whitehorse municipality (8904)	Q132817077	More images
T'äw Tà'är National Historic Site of Canada	30 miles east of Lake Laberge on the Teslin River; Teslin River, Yukon YT	61°14′37″N 134°37′00″W	Federal (19568)	Q22975472	Upload Photo
AJ Goddard Shipwreck	Lake Laberge, 200 meters from Goddard Point; Yukon YT	61°21′29″N 135°14′03″W		Q132817449	Upload Photo
Archdeacon McDonald Memorial Church and St Luke’s Church	Old Crow; Yukon YT	67°34′16″N 139°50′02″W		Q132817471	Upload Photo
Arctic Brotherhood Hall	Lots 1 and 2, Block S, Ladue Estate; Dawson City, Yukon YT	64°03′41″N 139°25′49″W		Q132817553	Upload Photo
Captain Martin House	305 Wood Street; Whitehorse, Yukon YT	60°43′14″N 135°03′22″W		Q132817571	Upload Photo
Casey Car House	First Avenue; Whitehorse, Yukon YT	60°43′03″N 135°02′52″W		Q132818601	Upload Photo
Ëdhä dädhëchą (Moosehide Slide)	Dawson City, Yukon YT	64°04′19″N 139°24′56″W		Q120736239	Upload Photo
Fort Selkirk	Lot 1021, Plan 2008-0123; Yukon YT	62°46′30″N 137°23′28″W		Q782621	More images
Gindèhchik–Rampart House	Yukon YT	67°25′02″N 140°59′52″W		Q116311774	Upload Photo
Hulland House	704 Wood Street; Whitehorse, Yukon YT	60°43′10″N 135°03′51″W		Q132818653	Upload Photo
Minto Park	blocks 3 and 5, Government Reserve; Dawson City, Yukon YT	64°03′26″N 139°26′04″W		Q132818657	Upload Photo
Old Log Church and Rectory	303 Elliott Street; Whitehorse, Yukon YT	60°43′06″N 135°03′14″W		Q132818665	More images
P. Denhardt Cabin	Dawson City, Yukon YT	64°04′06″N 139°25′24″W		Q132818667	Upload Photo
Telegraph Office	1124 First Avenue; Whitehorse, Yukon YT	60°43′16″N 135°03′05″W		Q132818671	Upload Photo
Watson Lake Air Terminal Building	Watson Lake Airport; Watson Lake, Yukon YT	60°06′50″N 128°49′23″W		Q132818678	Upload Photo
Watson Lake Sign Post Forest	Lot 1014-2; Watson Lake, Yukon YT	60°03′48″N 128°42′51″W		Q2377153	More images

== See also ==
- List of National Historic Sites of Canada in Yukon
