= Yukon Hotel =

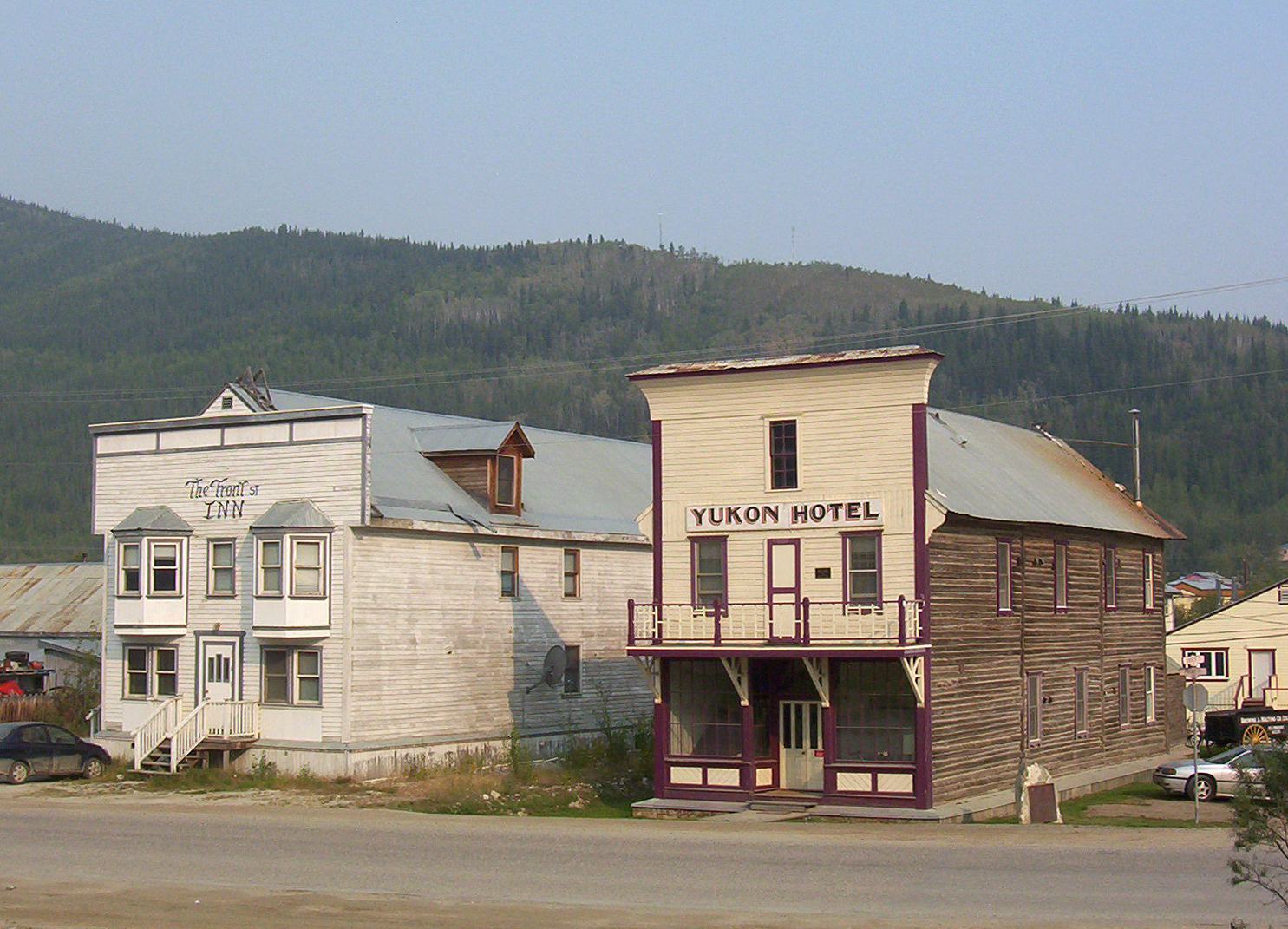
- The cream-coloured Yukon Hotel, adjacent to the Front Street Inn.
- Interactive map of the Yukon Hotel area
- Former names: Binet Block, Freeman Hotel, Miner's Rest Hotel

General information
- Type: Hotel
- Location: Dawson City, Yukon, Canada
- Coordinates: 64°03′33″N 139°26′18″W
- Completed: 1898
- Owner: Eldorado Hotel

Technical details
- Floor count: 2

Design and construction
- Architect: J.E. Binet

Website
- www.eldoradohotel.ca/yukon-hotel.html

National Historic Site of Canada
- Official name: Yukon Hotel National Historic Site of Canada
- Designated: 12 June 1982

The Yukon Hotel is a log building with a three-storey false facade on First Avenue at the corner of Church Street in Dawson City, Yukon, Canada. It is a National Historic Site of Canada and part of the Dawson Historical Complex.

== History ==
The building was constructed during the Klondike Gold Rush in 1898 by J.E. Binet, who named it Binet Block. A local entrepreneur, he and his brother J.O. Binet also operated Malden House, the Marconi Hotel, and Binet Brothers Saloon, and the Binet Bros. Hotel and General Merchants in Mayo. He and his workers used available materials, rushing to complete it by November. The narrow building had large street-level windows flanking the main entrance. Only the facade was made of milled lumber, as it was in short supply; the remainder of the building was made of "rough logs chinked with mud".

It was leased to the Government of Canada for $1000 per month, which used it for the office of the Commissioner of Yukon, William Ogilvie, for land and timber agent offices, the territorial registrar, and as living quarters for the staff. In November 1900, the government relocated its offices to the post office, newly constructed at the corner of Third Street and King Street. Binet then operated the building as a residence.

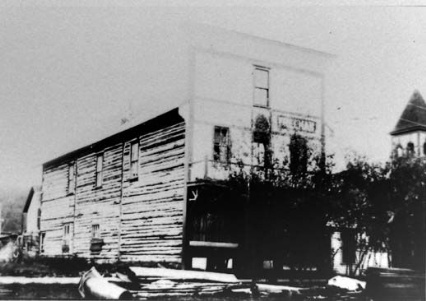
The Freeman Hotel in 1922.

The building then changed ownership many times. Henry Freeman bought Binet Block in 1909 and operated it as the Miner's Rest Hotel. In 1913, Minnie Witmore renamed it the Freeman Hotel. The building was purchased by hotelier Emma Wilson in 1933, whose adjacent hotel was destroyed by fire. She renamed it the Yukon Hotel after a previous but no longer existing hotel operated by James Booge from 1898 to 1902 and John Borland from 1903 to 1907. Wilson operated the hotel until 1957, after which it was boarded up.

Pierre Berton and other Dawson City natives urged the Government of Canada to save and restore the structure. In 1975, the Heritage Canada Foundation purchased the "vacant and decaying" building for $1, and by 1980 had spent $386,000 to renovate it. In 1983 the foundation sold the building, and in 1985, innkeeper and operator of the Eldorado Hotel, Peter Jenkins, purchased it.

It was designated a National Historic Site of Canada on 12 June 1982, and a commemorative plaque is installed on a large rock adjacent to the building. It was selected based on its "representation of typical commercial structures built at the height" of the Klondike Gold Rush, such as siting flush to the sidewalk, roof pitch, three-storey false facade, and log construction. It forms part of the Dawson Historical Complex with other frontier buildings identified by the Historic Sites and Monuments Board of Canada, including the adjacent St. Paul's Anglican Church, the Bank of British North America building, and the Carnegie Library.

== See also ==
- List of National Historic Sites of Canada in Yukon
