= Mining methods of the Klondike Gold Rush =

Coordinates: 63°55′39″N 139°19′32″W

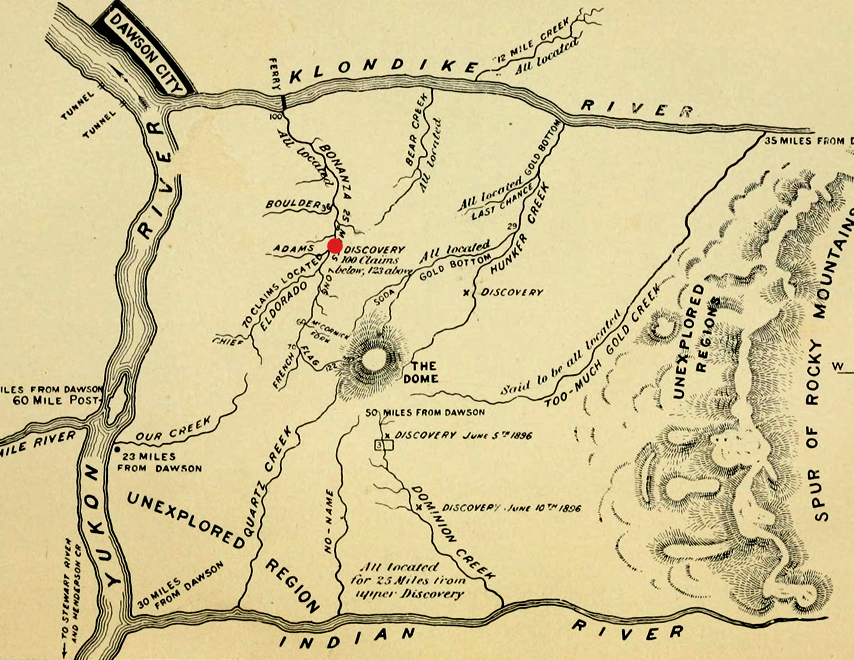
Klondike goldfield. Red dot: Discovery Claim. Text saying all located shows that Klondikers were informed about claims already made.

The mining methods of the Klondike Gold Rush reflected the difficulties of extracting gold from the permanently frozen ground of the Klondike goldfields. During the 1896–1899 gold rush, some gold was recovered from creek beds, but most occurred in gravel deposits near or within the bedrock. Recovery involved first excavating or moving the gold-bearing gravel and then separating the gold from it using water and gravity. Because the ground was affected by permafrost, miners commonly thawed it with fires and, later, steam before excavating shafts. Hydraulic methods were also used to wash gravel down hillsides or raise it for processing.

Gold was separated from gravel principally by panning, rocker boxes, and sluices, with the greater availability of water in summer making most separation work seasonal. After the rush, mining became increasingly mechanized: gold dredges operated in the Klondike River valley from 1910 to 1950, excavating and processing large quantities of gravel. Modern placer operations in the region use hydraulic methods in combination with bulldozers.

== Gold rush era (1896–1899) ==
During the gold rush some gold was found in the creek beds, but most was in the valley gravels near and in the bedrock. The recovery had two steps: bringing the gravel containing gold to the surface and then separating the gold from the gravel using water and gravity separation. As a result, access to water was important since it was necessary for the separation process and could also be used to thaw the permanently frozen ground and to wash down gravels from the upper terraces.

== Methods of bringing out the gold ==
The first step of recovery was to bring the mixture of gold and dirt from the ground to the surface or from a hillside down to a bench. There were two methods: digging a shaft or using pressurized water to either wash soil down a hillside or suck it up from the ground.

=== Underground mining ===
Most of the gold was below the surface. The miners first had to thaw the permafrost before they could dig. A fire burning all night was used to soften the ground. This would then thaw to a depth of about 14 inches and the gravel could be removed. The process was repeated until the gold was reached. No support of the shaft was necessary because of the permafrost. However, the fire could produce noxious gas which had to be removed. Over time steam for thawing the ground was also taken into use. Normally digging was done during the winter. The cold air would sink down into the shaft and renew the air automatically. At the same time, the temperature meant that shafts, apart from not needing support, were not at risk of being filled with water. A dump was made that could be sluiced during the summer. In the dump, the gold was protected from theft because it was invisible in frozen gravel.

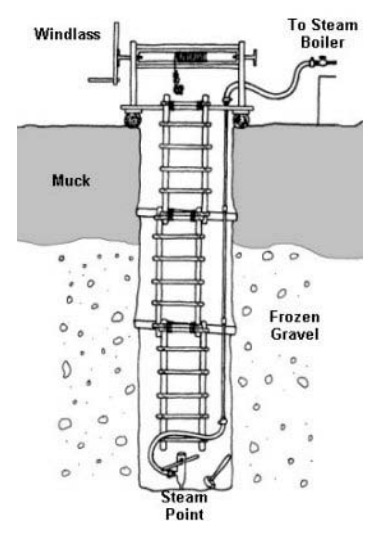
Principles of mining with steam
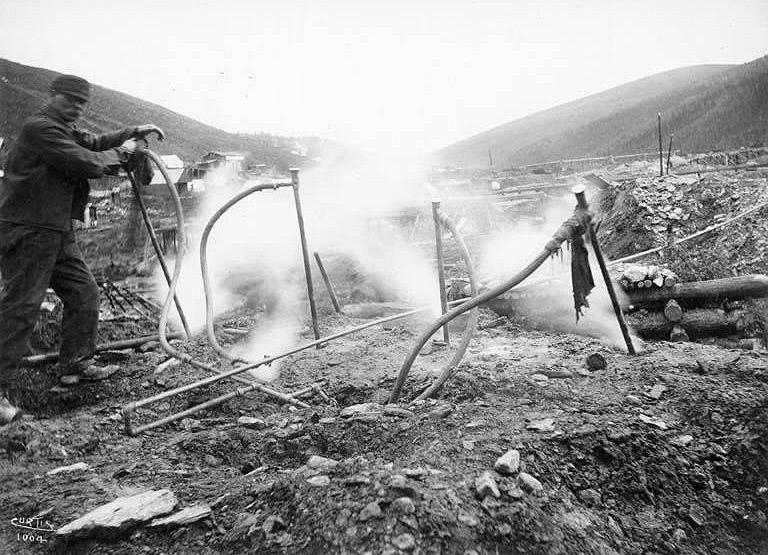
Thawing ground with steam, 1898
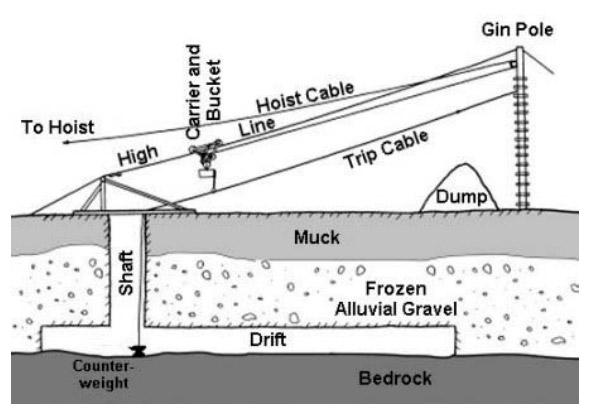
Principles of mining with shaft
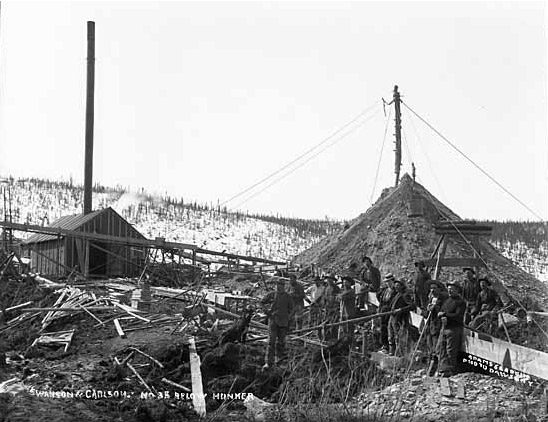
Steam plant, sluice and dump, Hunker, ca. 1901

=== Hydraulic methods and mining in benches ===
Jets were applied to wash down part of a hillside for sluicing. The stream could be so strong that it would reflect a crowbar swung at it. When gravity could not be used for sluicing, a lift could be applied; it used pressurized water, introduced at the bottom, to suck up a mixture of water and gravel. This could also be an alternative to shaft mining as seen on picture 2. Hydraulic methods were introduced during the California gold rush and would be used later at Nome.

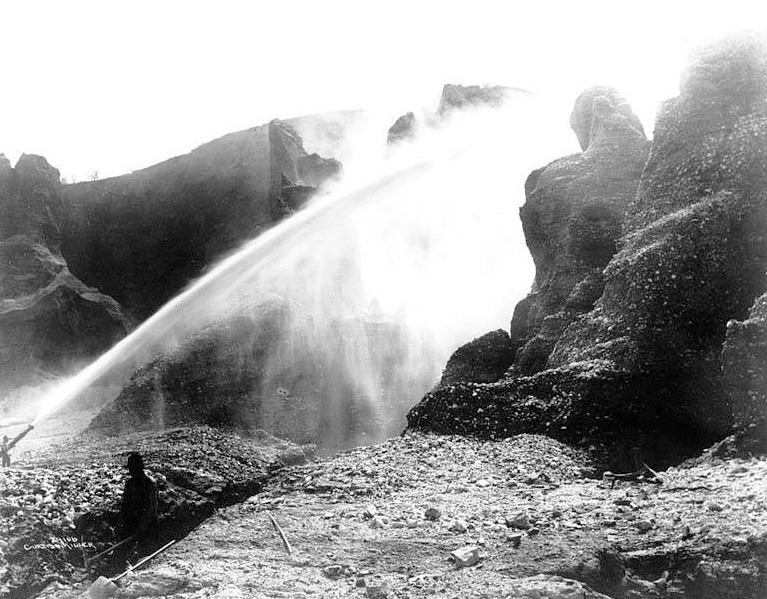
Jet of water washing down a hillside, 1898
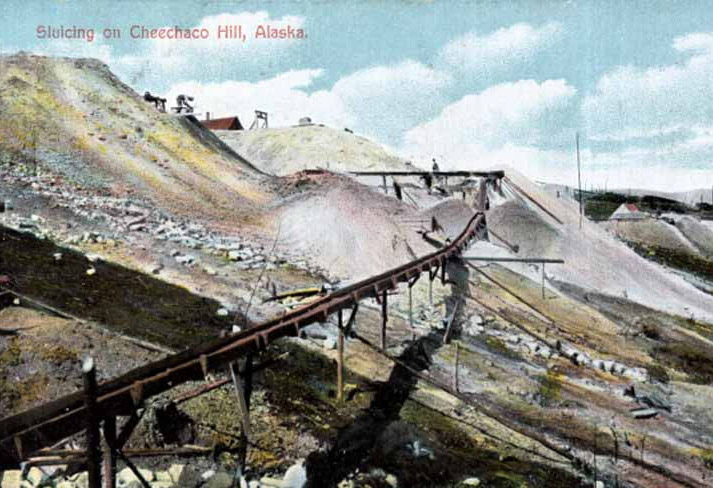
Mining with sluices on hillside at Klondike, 1898
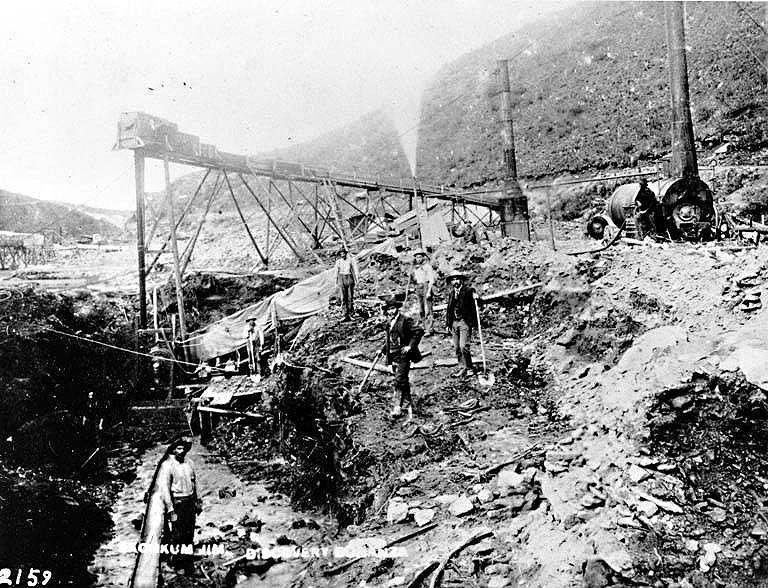
Hydraulic lift on discovery claim, 1898

=== Separation methods ===
All methods required water and because of that they could only be used during the summer. Panning for gold was the simplest method of recovering gold, but mostly used for prospecting since it was slow. A faster way was by a rocker box or by sluicing. Dirt was filled into the box or sluice together with water and rocking movements or gravity would make the gold particle go to the bottom whereas sand and fine gold particles would flow off with the water. Further purification of the gold could be done with mercury that would amalgamate with gold only and leave fine sand particles out. A magnet could be used to separate fine magnetic sand from gold dust.

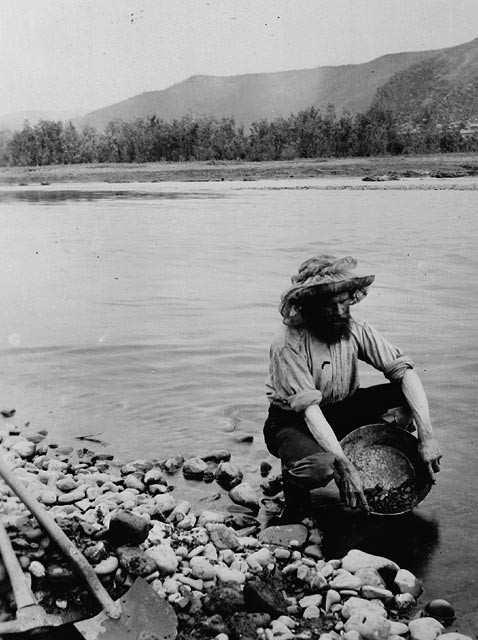
Panning for gold, 1898
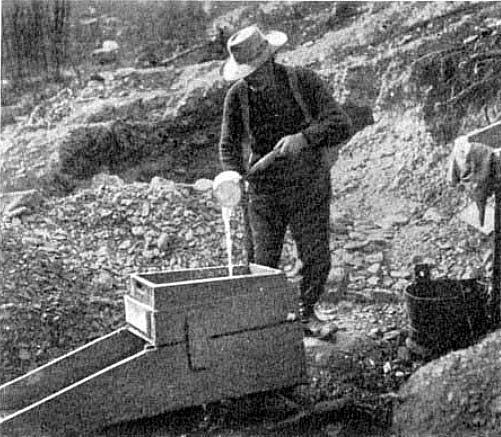
Rocker box, 1898
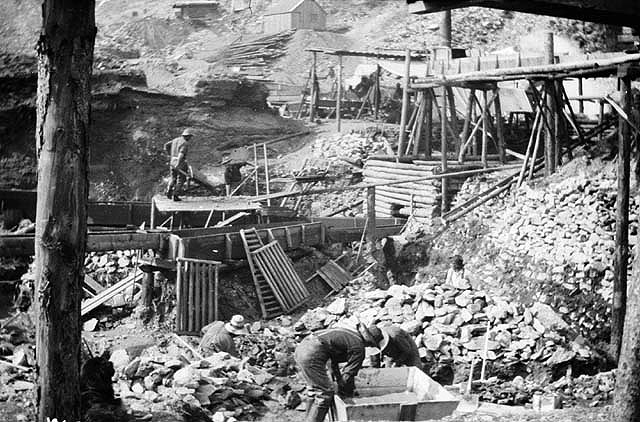
Sluices, Bonanza Creek, 1899

== Later operations (1910–1950) ==
Dredges were used in the Klondike River valley from 1910-1950. A dredge could do the work of 2,400 persons while operated by 10-12. It would create a pool of water that moved along with it as it dug up gravel in front and deposited it behind itself. Inside sand and gold particles were separated from rocks and then gold from sand. By sweeping from side to side around a pole it could cover an area wider than itself producing sandbars resembling pieces of bread lying down next to one another.

Today a mixture of hydraulic methods together with bulldozers are used.

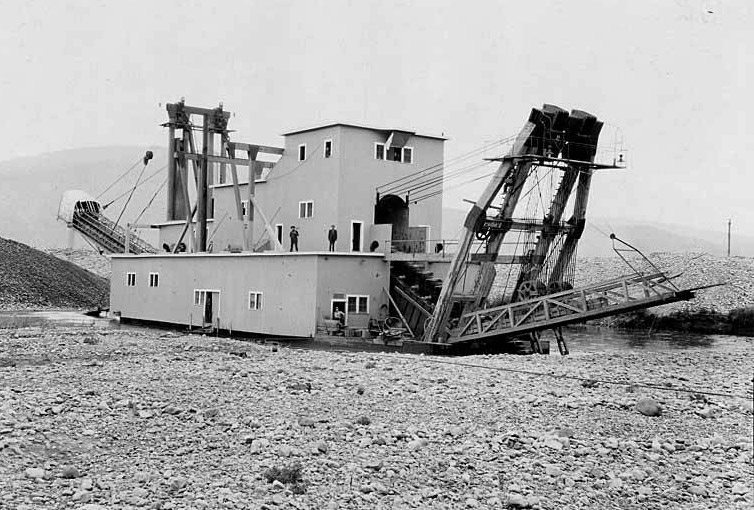
Dredge at Bear Creek, 1913

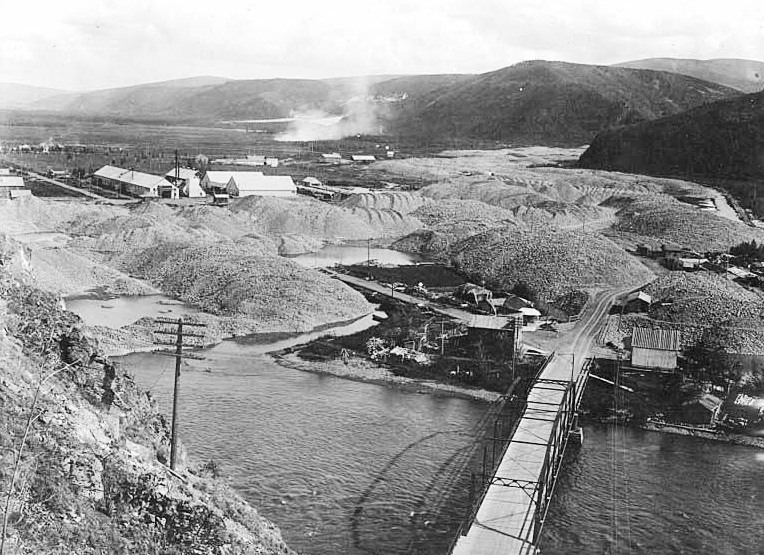
Sandbars made by dredge, Klondike, 1913
