= Custer, Idaho =

- Custer Historic District
- U.S. National Register of Historic Places
- U.S. Historic district
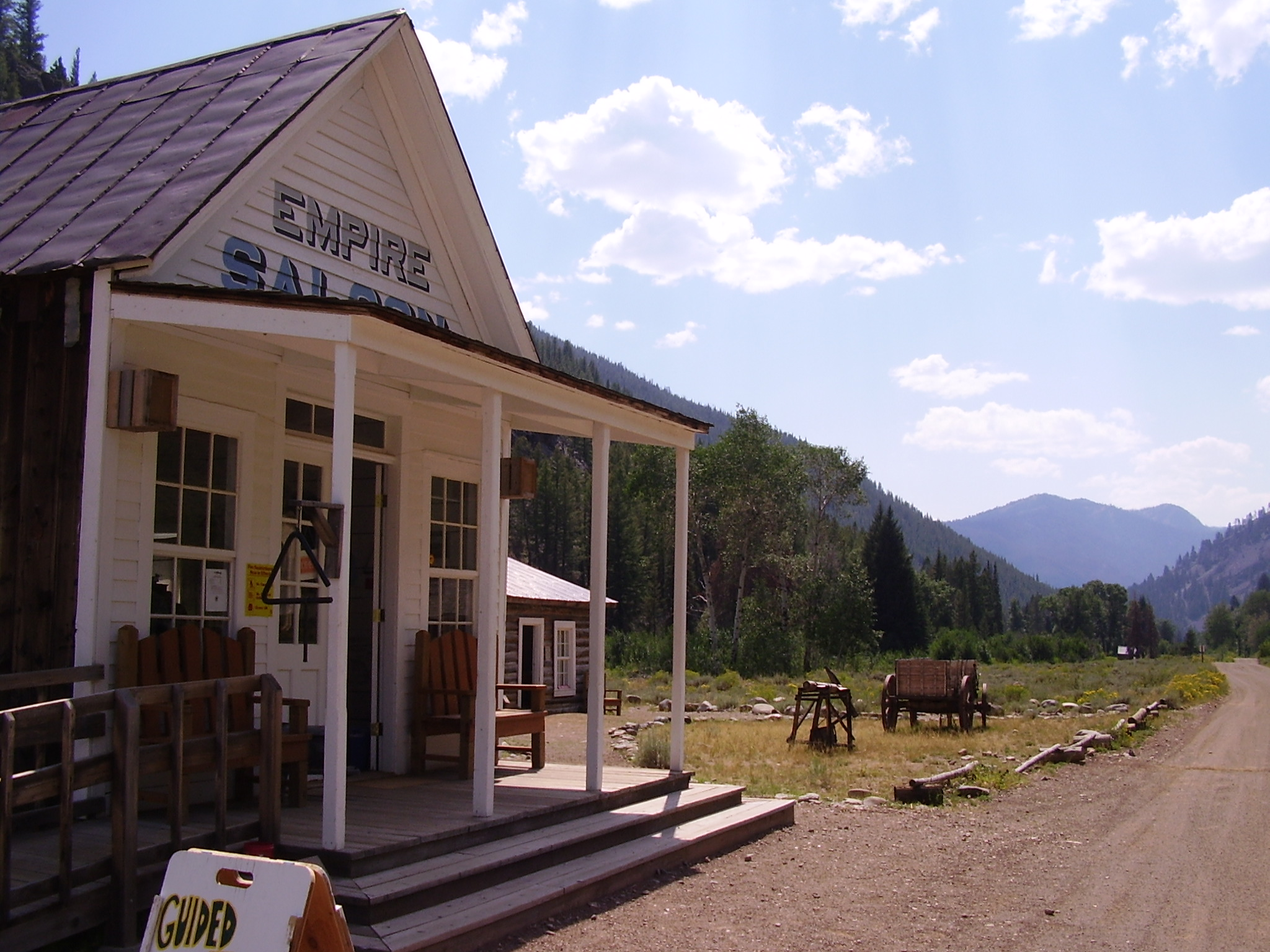
- Empire Saloon

- Location within Idaho Location within the United States
- Location: Yankee Fork Rd., Custer County, southwest of Challis, Idaho
- Coordinates: 44°23′15″N 114°41′45″W
- Area: 29 acres (12 ha)
- Built: 1877
- NRHP reference No.: 81000207
- Added to NRHP: February 3, 1981

Custer is a ghost town in Custer County, Idaho, United States. Established in 1877, it is at 44°23′15″N 114°41′45″W (44.3874133, -114.6959118), at an elevation of 6,470 feet (1,972 m). It lies along Yankee Fork Road southwest of the city of Challis, within the Challis National Forest.

In 1981, the community was listed on the National Register of Historic Places as a historic district. Although the district covers 29 acres (12 ha), only seven buildings retain enough historic integrity to qualify as contributing properties.

Most of Custer is now included in the Land of the Yankee Fork State Park, which also includes the nearby historic Yankee Fork gold dredge.

Custer is the site of the geographic center of Idaho, located about 5 miles to the southeast.
