= Strevell, Idaho =

Ghost town in Cassia County, Idaho, United States

- Ghost town
- Location in Idaho Location in the United States
- Coordinates: 42°0′22″N 113°12′13″W
- Country: United States
- State: Idaho
- County: Cassia
- Elevation: 5,286 ft (1,611 m)
- Time zone: UTC-7 (Mountain (MST))
  - Summer (DST): UTC-6 (MDT)
- ZIP code: 83342
- Area codes: 208, 986
- GNIS feature ID: 398193

Strevell is a ghost town in Cassia County, Idaho, United States, approximately one mile (1.6 km) north of the Utah state line and roughly 23 miles (37 km) south–southeast of Malta. It is located in the Raft River Valley along the former routing of U.S. Route 30S, and later the former routing of Idaho State Highway 81.

== Child abduction recovery ==
Sixty years after the school in the community was closed and year after becoming a ghost town, Strevell made national headlines. On July 14, 1983 a four-year-old girl was abducted from a movie theater in Salt Lake City, Utah. Despite a massive search, the child could not be found. Two days later, the Box Elder County Sheriff's Office in Utah received a call from a biker who reported that he had found the girl sitting in the abandoned school building when he stopped for the night. (The police never suspected the biker had any involvement in the abduction.)

== See also ==
- List of ghost towns in Idaho
