= Land of the Yankee Fork State Park =

State park in Idaho, United States

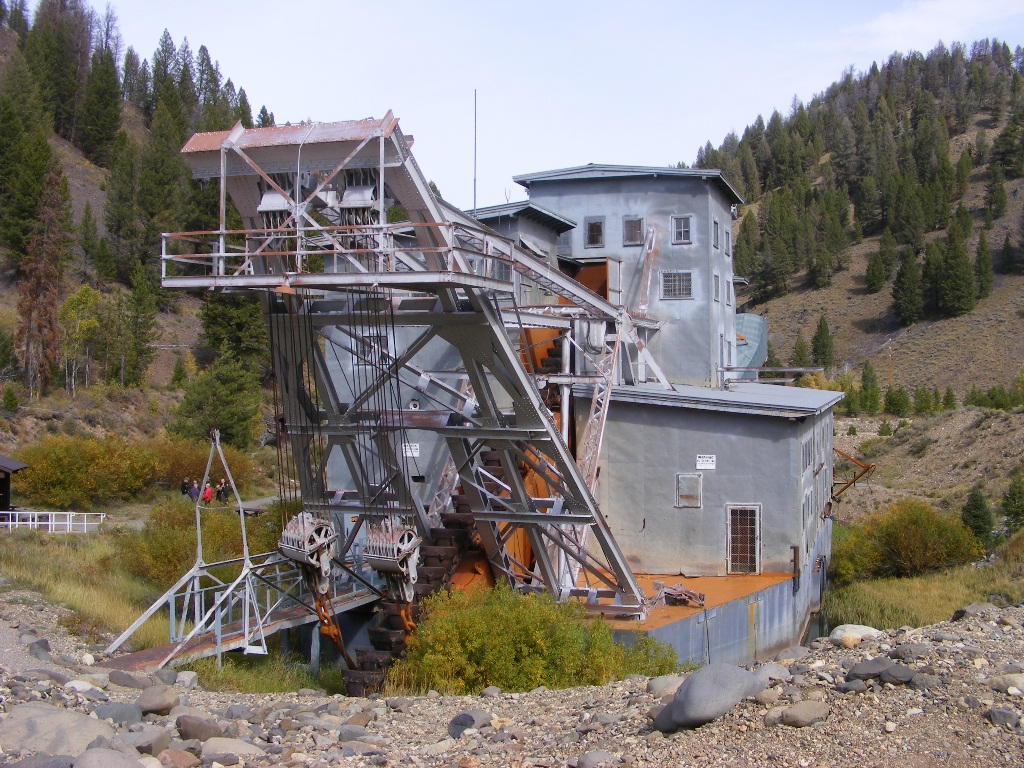
- Yankee Fork gold dredge

- Location within Idaho Location within the United States
- Location: Custer County, Idaho, United States
- Nearest city: Challis, Idaho
- Coordinates: 44°28′32″N 114°12′38″W
- Area: 521 acres (211 ha)
- Elevation: Challis: 5,001 ft (1,524 m); Custer: 6,500 ft (2,000 m)
- Established: 1990
- Administrator: Idaho Department of Parks and Recreation
- Website: Official website

Land of the Yankee Fork State Park is a history-oriented public recreation area covering 521 acres (211 ha) in Custer County, Idaho, United States. The state park interprets Idaho's frontier mining history, including the ghost towns Bayhorse, Bonanza, and Custer. The interpretive center near Challis has a museum and gold panning station. Challis Hot Springs became a unit of the park in 2022. The park was created in 1990 with the purchase of twenty acres where the interpretive center is located two miles south of Challis. It is operated by the Idaho Department of Parks and Recreation in cooperation with the United States Forest Service.

== See also ==
- List of Idaho state parks
- National Parks in Idaho
