= Bayhorse, Idaho =

Former mining town

- Bayhorse
- U.S. National Register of Historic Places
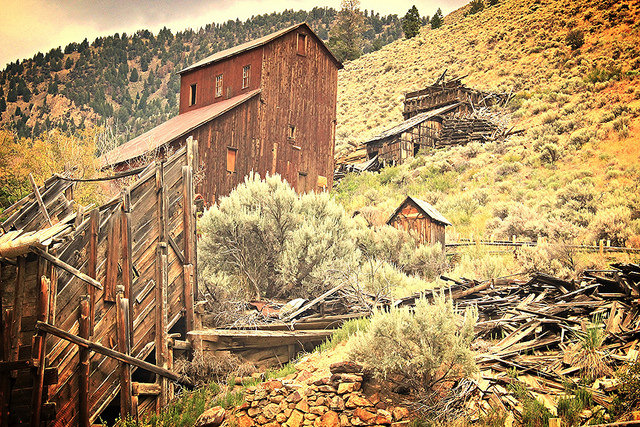

- Location within Idaho Location within the United States
- Location: Custer County, Idaho
- Nearest city: Challis, Idaho
- Coordinates: 44°23′52″N 114°18′42″W
- Built: 1877
- NRHP reference No.: 76000671
- Added to NRHP: March 15, 1976

Bayhorse is a ghost town in Custer County, Idaho, United States, founded in 1877, though active development of the town did not begin until 1880. Bayhorse was once a thriving mining town, principally supported by large nearby silver deposit. In 1882, the town increased its smelting capabilities, producing $300,000 ($10 million in 2025) worth of silver over the course of the year. By 1885, the town had grown to 300 residents, supported by a mill, three stores, a hotel, a restaurant, a meat market, a lodging house, and five saloons. The same year, the town built a refinery, allowing the mining industry to issue silver bars and by 1900, the town had extracted over $10 million ($387 million in 2025) in total ores, including silver, lead, and copper.

In 1976, the entire community was added to the National Register of Historic Places. The town property was purchased by the state in 2006 and opened to the public in 2009 as part of the Land of the Yankee Fork State Park.

== Remains ==
Along the main dirt street, several preserved ruins of houses and mining equipment are still visible. Also intact are charcoal kilns used to make charcoal to smelt the ore from the mines.
