= Boles, Idaho =

- Ghost Town
- Location within Idaho Location within the United States
- Coordinates: 45°55′20″N 116°32′59″W
- Country: United States
- State: Idaho
- County: Idaho County, Idaho
- Elevation: 4,890 ft (1,490 m)
- Time zone: UTC-6 (Central (CST))
  - Summer (DST): UTC-5 (CDT)
- ZIP code: 83522
- Area code: 208

Boles is a ghost town in Idaho County, Idaho, United States. It is near to Cottonwood, Idaho.

== History ==
The town was settled by Mr. and Mrs D.H. Boles to mine for gold. It then became a mining town, the town started losing residents in the 1930s because the gold rush was ending. It had a post office in 1922.

It had a population of 116 when the 1930 census was taken.
