= Custer County, Idaho =

County in Idaho, United States

- County
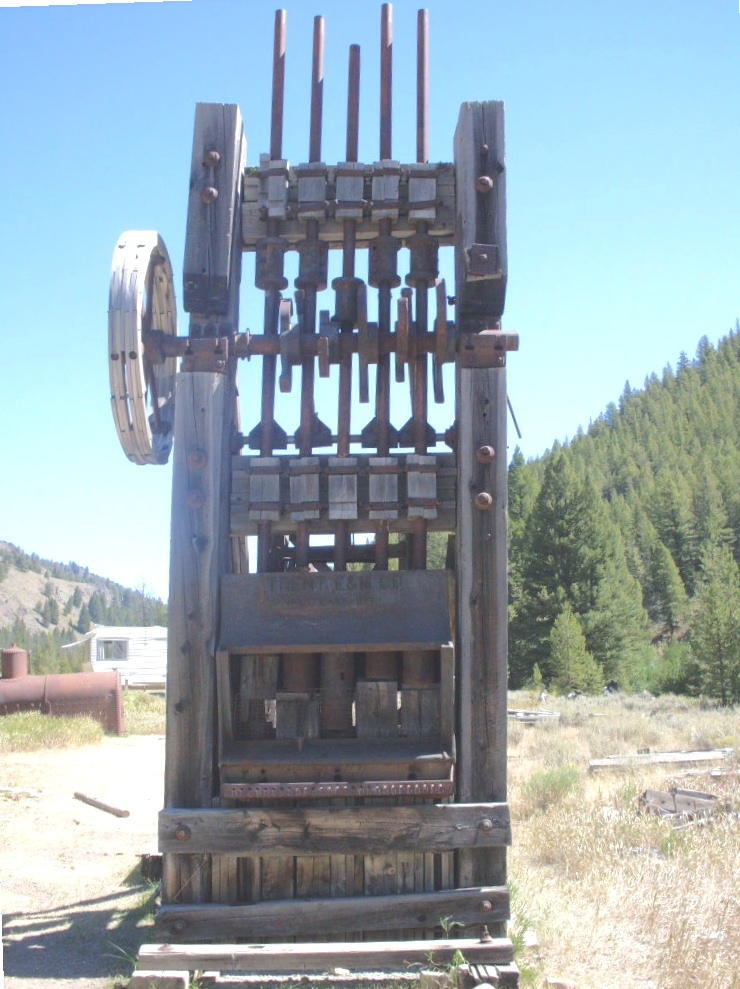
- Mill used to process gold and silver ore at Yankee Fork mining operations.

- Seal

- Location within the U.S. state of Idaho
- Coordinates: 44°14′N 114°17′W
- Country: United States
- State: Idaho
- Founded: January 8, 1881
- Named for: General Custer gold mine
- Seat: Challis
- Largest city: Challis

Area
  - Total: 4,937 sq mi (12,790 km^{2})
  - Land: 4,921 sq mi (12,750 km^{2})
  - Water: 16 sq mi (41 km^{2}) 0.3%

Population (2020)
  - Total: 4,275
  - Estimate (2025): 4,636 ▲
  - Density: 0.88/sq mi (0.34/km^{2})
- Time zone: UTC−7 (Mountain)
  - Summer (DST): UTC−6 (MDT)
- Congressional district: 2nd
- Website: custercountyidaho.org

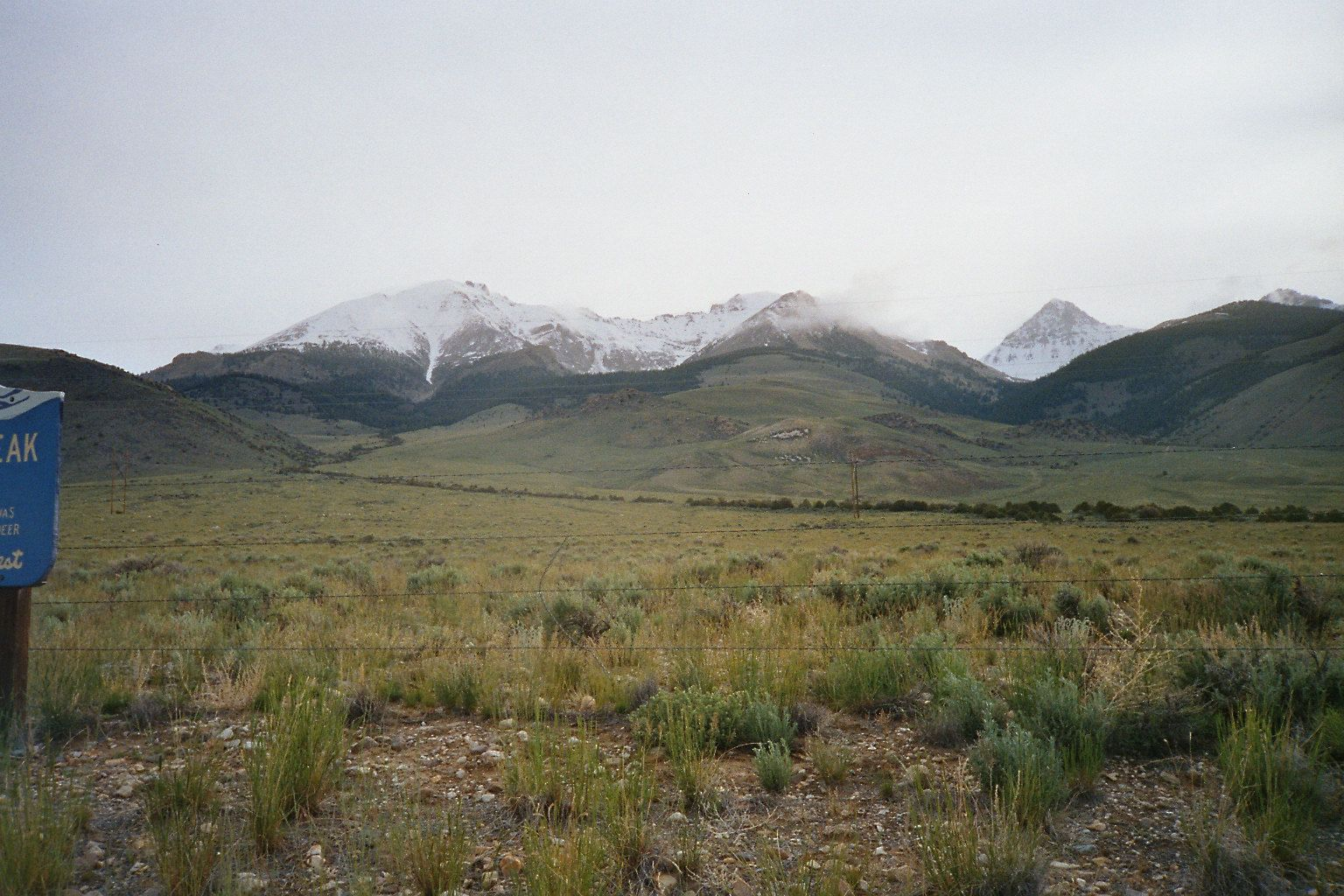
Leatherman Peak, 12,228 feet (3,727 m), second highest in Idaho, in the Lost River Range in eastern Custer County

Custer County is a rural mountain county in the center of the U.S. state of Idaho. As of the 2020 census, the population was 4,275, making it the fifth-least populous county in Idaho. The county seat is Challis. Established in 1881, the county was named for the General Custer Mine, where gold was discovered five years earlier. Custer County relies on ranching, mining, and tourism as its main resources.

== Geography ==
According to the U.S. Census Bureau, the county has a total area of 4,937 square miles (12,790 km^{2}), of which 4,721 square miles (12,230 km^{2}) is land and 16 square miles (41 km^{2}) (0.3%) is water. It is the third-largest county in Idaho by area.

The Lost River Range, the state's highest mountains, are located in eastern Custer County. The highest is Borah Peak, the highest natural point in Idaho at 12,662 feet (3,859 m). On the western border of the county is Idaho's famous Sawtooth Range; the tallest is Thompson Peak in Custer County, above picturesque Redfish Lake. Twenty miles (32 km) east are the White Cloud Mountains, the tallest of which is Castle Peak at 11,815 feet (3,601 m).

The Salmon River and Big Lost River flow through Custer County.

=== Adjacent counties ===
- Lemhi County – north
- Butte County – east
- Blaine County – south
- Elmore County – southwest
- Boise County – southwest
- Valley County – west

=== Major highways ===
- US 93
- SH-21
- SH-75

=== National protected areas ===
- Challis National Forest (part)
- Sawtooth National Forest (part)
- Sawtooth National Recreation Area (part)
  - Hemingway–Boulders Wilderness (part)
  - Jim McClure–Jerry Peak Wilderness
  - Sawtooth Wilderness (part)
  - Cecil D. Andrus–White Clouds Wilderness

== Demographics ==
Historical population
Census	Pop.	Note	%±
1890	1,870		—
1900	2,049		9.6%
1910	3,001		46.5%
1920	3,550		18.3%
1930	3,162		−10.9%
1940	3,549		12.2%
1950	3,318		−6.5%
1960	2,996		−9.7%
1970	2,967		−1.0%
1980	3,385		14.1%
1990	4,133		22.1%
2000	4,342		5.1%
2010	4,368		0.6%
2020	4,275		−2.1%
2025 (est.)	4,636	▲	8.4%
U.S. Decennial Census; 1790–1960 1900–1990; 1990–2000 2010–2020

=== Racial and ethnic composition ===
Custer County, Idaho – Racial and ethnic composition Note: the US Census treats Hispanic/Latino as an ethnic category. This table excludes Latinos from the racial categories and assigns them to a separate category. Hispanics/Latinos may be of any race.
Race / Ethnicity (NH = Non-Hispanic)	Pop 1980	Pop 1990	Pop 2000	Pop 2010	Pop 2020	% 1980	% 1990	% 2000	% 2010	% 2020
White alone (NH)	3,304	3,993	4,100	4,108	3,893	97.61%	96.61%	94.43%	94.05%	91.06%
Black or African American alone (NH)	0	2	0	5	3	0.00%	0.05%	0.00%	0.11%	0.07%
Native American or Alaska Native alone (NH)	23	32	22	26	32	0.68%	0.77%	0.51%	0.60%	0.75%
Asian alone (NH)	3	16	1	10	15	0.09%	0.39%	0.02%	0.23%	0.35%
Native Hawaiian or Pacific Islander alone (NH)	x	x	1	4	1	x	x	0.02%	0.09%	0.02%
Other race alone (NH)	0	0	0	0	19	0.00%	0.00%	0.00%	0.00%	0.44%
Mixed race or Multiracial (NH)	x	x	35	39	156	x	x	0.81%	0.89%	3.65%
Hispanic or Latino (any race)	55	90	183	176	156	1.62%	2.18%	4.21%	4.03%	3.65%
Total	3,385	4,133	4,342	4,368	4,275	100.00%	100.00%	100.00%	100.00%	100.00%

=== 2020 census ===
As of the 2020 census, the county had a population of 4,275, a median age of 54.0 years, 17.2% of residents under the age of 18, 30.0% aged 65 or older, 108.1 males for every 100 females, and 108.1 males for every 100 females age 18 and over.

The racial makeup of the county was 92.2% White, 0.1% Black or African American, 0.8% American Indian and Alaska Native, 0.4% Asian, 0.0% Native Hawaiian and Pacific Islander, 1.4% from some other race, and 5.1% from two or more races. Hispanic or Latino residents of any race comprised 3.6% of the population.

0.0% of residents lived in urban areas, while 100.0% lived in rural areas.

There were 1,948 households in the county, of which 19.1% had children under the age of 18 living with them, 19.9% had a female householder with no spouse or partner present, 32.7% of all households were made up of individuals, and 16.1% had someone living alone who was 65 years of age or older. There were 3,021 housing units, 35.5% of which were vacant; among occupied housing units, 77.3% were owner-occupied and 22.7% were renter-occupied. The homeowner vacancy rate was 2.3% and the rental vacancy rate was 9.6%.

=== 2010 census ===
As of the 2010 United States census, there were 4,368 people, 1,936 households, and 1,244 families living in the county. The population density was 0.9 inhabitants per square mile (0.35/km^{2}). There were 3,103 housing units at an average density of 0.6 units per square mile (0.23 units/km^{2}). The racial makeup of the county was 96.4% white, 0.6% American Indian, 0.2% black or African American, 0.2% Asian, 0.1% Pacific islander, 1.5% from other races, and 1.0% from two or more races. Those of Hispanic or Latino origin made up 4.0% of the population. In terms of ancestry, 34.3% were English, 25.6% were German, 19.5% were Irish, and 2.8% were American.

Of the 1,936 households, 24.2% had children under the age of 18 living with them, 55.7% were married couples living together, 4.8% had a female householder with no husband present, 35.7% were non-families, and 30.2% of all households were made up of individuals. The average household size was 2.25 and the average family size was 2.74. The median age was 48.0 years.

The median income for a household in the county was $41,910 and the median income for a family was $56,710. Males had a median income of $42,865 versus $27,317 for females. The per capita income for the county was $22,625. About 10.1% of families and 13.8% of the population were below the poverty line, including 19.2% of those under age 18 and 13.2% of those age 65 or over.

=== 2000 census ===
As of the census of 2000, there were 4,342 people, 1,770 households, and 1,196 families living in the county. The population density was 0.88 people per square mile (0.34 people/km^{2}). There were 2,983 housing units at an average density of 0.60 units per square mile (0.23 units/km^{2}). The racial makeup of the county was 97.28% White, 0.55% Native American, 0.02% Asian, 0.02% Pacific Islander, 1.17% from other races, and 0.94% from two or more races. 4.21% of the population were Hispanic or Latino of any race. 18.6% were of English, 17.0% German, 10.9% Irish and 9.9% American ancestry.

There were 1,770 households, out of which 29.90% had children under the age of 18 living with them, 60.10% were married couples living together, 4.40% had a female householder with no husband present, and 32.40% were non-families. 27.70% of all households were made up of individuals, and 11.30% had someone living alone who was 65 years of age or older. The average household size was 2.41 and the average family size was 2.96.

In the county, the population was distributed as follows: 25.50% were under 18, 4.80% were between 18 and 24, 25.90% were between 25 and 44, 29.30% were between 45 and 64, and 14.50% were 65 or older. The median age was 41 years. There were 104.50 males for every 100 females, and for every 100 females aged 18 and over, there were 106.80 males.

The median income for a household in the county was $32,174, and the median income for a family was $39,551. Males had a median income of $32,255 versus $21,463 for females. The per capita income for the county was $15,783. About 10.70% of families and 14.30% of the population were below the poverty line, including 16.70% of those under age 18 and 12.80% of those age 65 or over.

== Politics ==
Custer County is overwhelmingly Republican. The last Democrat to carry the county was John F. Kennedy in 1960, since 1968 no Democrat has passed 37 percent of the county's vote, and the last to pass 28 percent was Michael Dukakis in 1988. However, unusually for so Republican a county, the westernmost precincts adjacent to Blaine County give Democratic majorities in most statewide elections. In the 2008 Presidential election, it supported Republican John McCain over Democrat Barack Obama by a margin of 71 percent to 25 percent. In 2012, the county gave Mitt Romney a first ballot victory in the Republican primary caucus and subsequently voted 74.1 percent for him in the Presidential election. In 2016, Donald Trump won the Republican primaries with 41.8 percent of support in the county although Ted Cruz won the state with 45.5 percent.

United States presidential election results for Custer County, Idaho
Year	Republican		Democratic		Third party(ies)	
Year	No.	%	No.	%	No.	%
1892	187	36.52%	0	0.00%	325	63.48%
1896	29	4.60%	599	95.08%	2	0.32%
1900	261	30.67%	590	69.33%	0	0.00%
1904	496	51.29%	429	44.36%	42	4.34%
1908	521	43.09%	598	49.46%	90	7.44%
1912	326	27.42%	501	42.14%	362	30.45%
1916	454	32.22%	879	62.38%	76	5.39%
1920	808	67.22%	394	32.78%	0	0.00%
1924	585	45.99%	394	30.97%	293	23.03%
1928	647	55.25%	516	44.06%	8	0.68%
1932	440	33.77%	839	64.39%	24	1.84%
1936	530	37.30%	875	61.58%	16	1.13%
1940	760	45.81%	894	53.89%	5	0.30%
1944	565	47.96%	613	52.04%	0	0.00%
1948	612	48.69%	625	49.72%	20	1.59%
1952	1,058	69.74%	452	29.80%	7	0.46%
1956	811	60.34%	533	39.66%	0	0.00%
1960	651	43.72%	838	56.28%	0	0.00%
1964	720	50.21%	714	49.79%	0	0.00%
1968	711	49.96%	385	27.06%	327	22.98%
1972	989	69.06%	274	19.13%	169	11.80%
1976	850	60.33%	516	36.62%	43	3.05%
1980	1,398	73.50%	398	20.93%	106	5.57%
1984	1,653	77.10%	461	21.50%	30	1.40%
1988	1,253	66.09%	616	32.49%	27	1.42%
1992	829	38.31%	564	26.06%	771	35.63%
1996	1,249	53.93%	635	27.42%	432	18.65%
2000	1,794	77.00%	416	17.85%	120	5.15%
2004	1,762	74.72%	559	23.71%	37	1.57%
2008	1,694	71.99%	611	25.97%	48	2.04%
2012	1,744	74.06%	530	22.51%	81	3.44%
2016	1,777	73.61%	427	17.69%	210	8.70%
2020	2,089	76.27%	603	22.02%	47	1.72%
2024	1,998	75.40%	586	22.11%	66	2.49%

== Communities ==
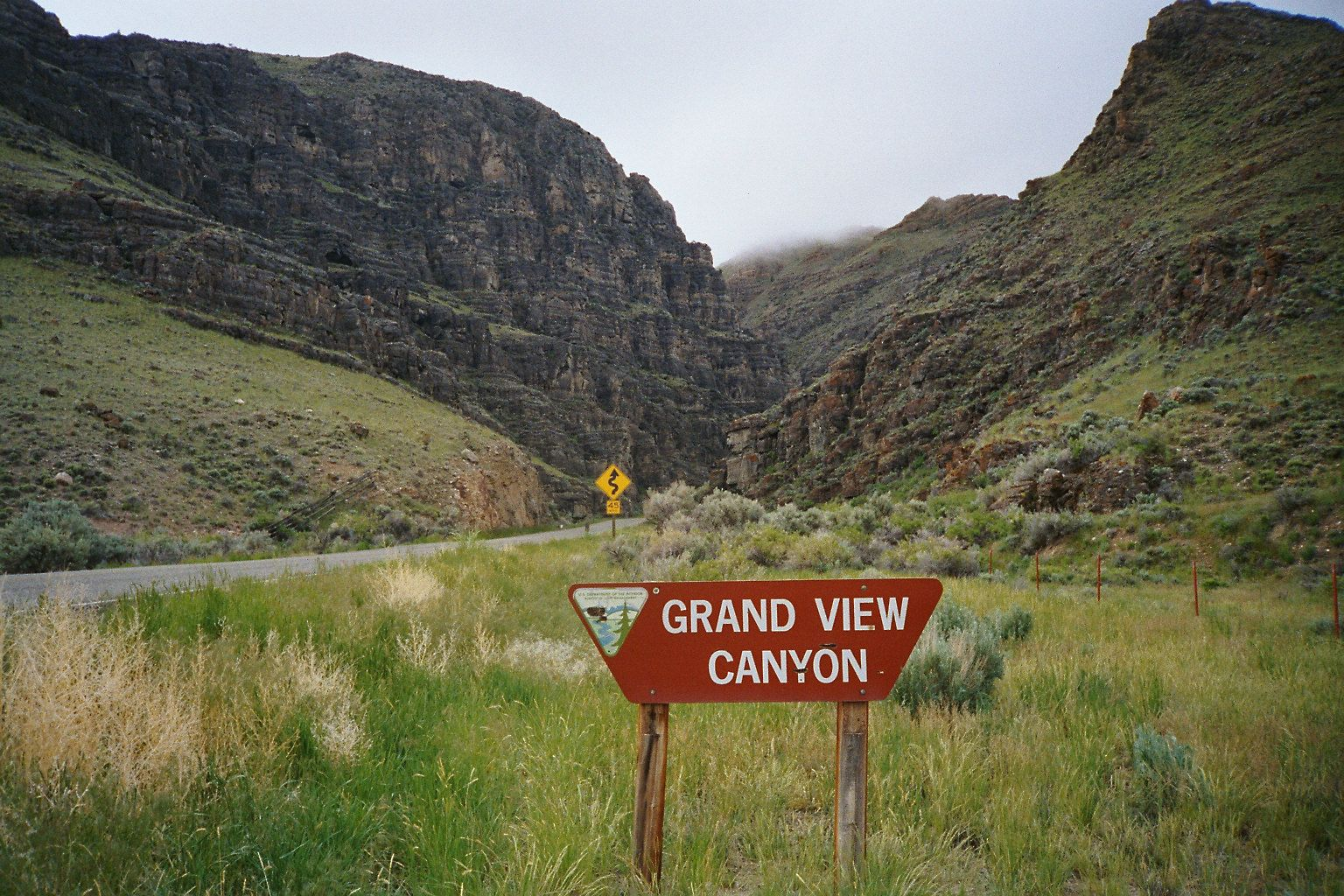
Grand View Canyon (US-93) between Mackay and Challis

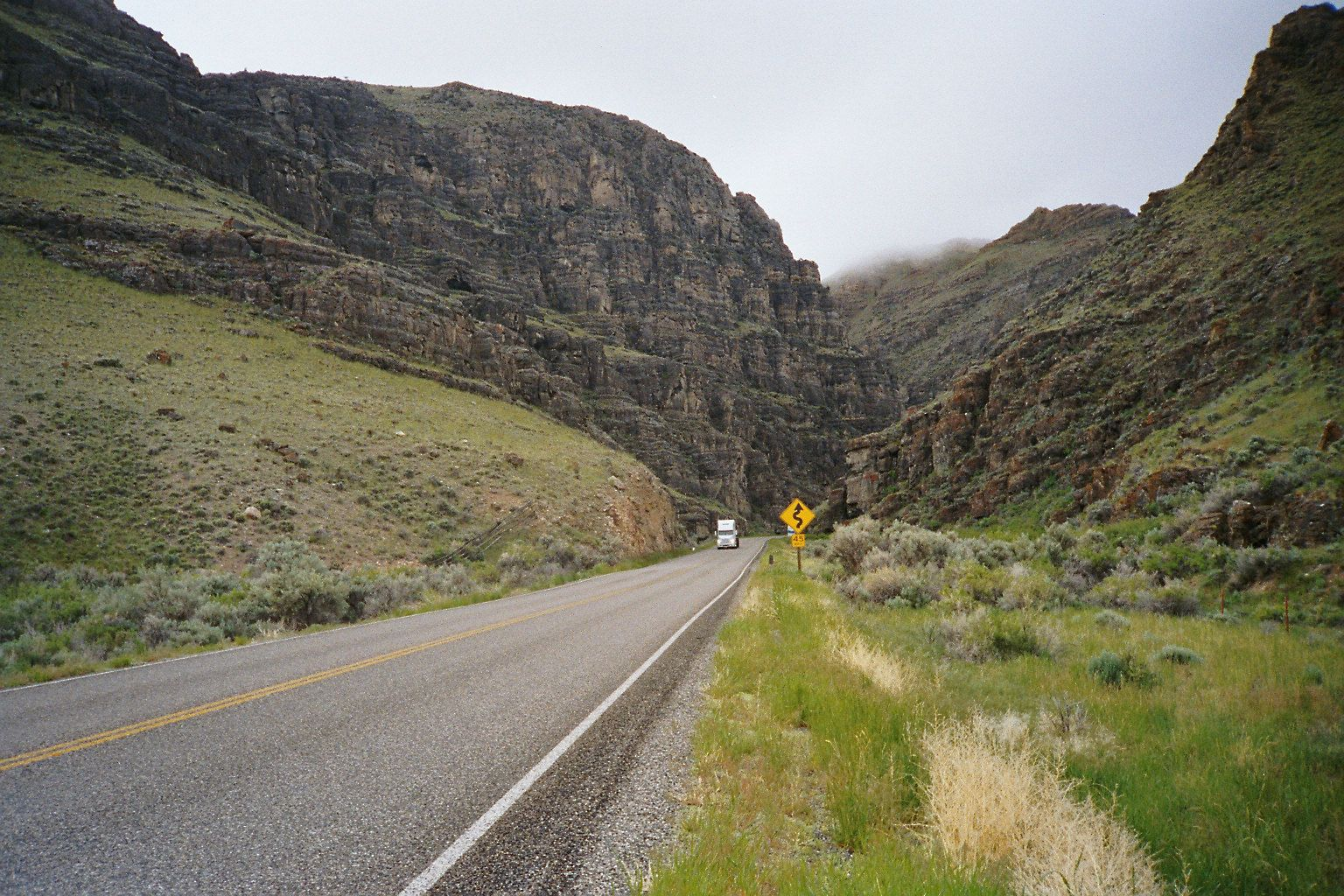
Grand View Canyon (US-93)

=== Cities ===
- Challis
- Clayton
- Lost River
- Mackay
- Stanley

=== Unincorporated communities ===
- Dickey
- Ellis
- Goldburg

=== Ghost towns ===
- Bayhorse
- Bonanza
- Custer

== Education ==
School districts include:

- Butte County Joint School District 111
- Challis Joint School District 181
- Mackay Joint School District 182

College of Eastern Idaho includes this county in its catchment zone; however this county is not in its taxation zone.

== See also ==
- National Register of Historic Places listings in Custer County, Idaho
