= Bonanza, Idaho =

Ghost town in Idaho, United States

Coordinates: 44°22′14″N 114°43′40″W

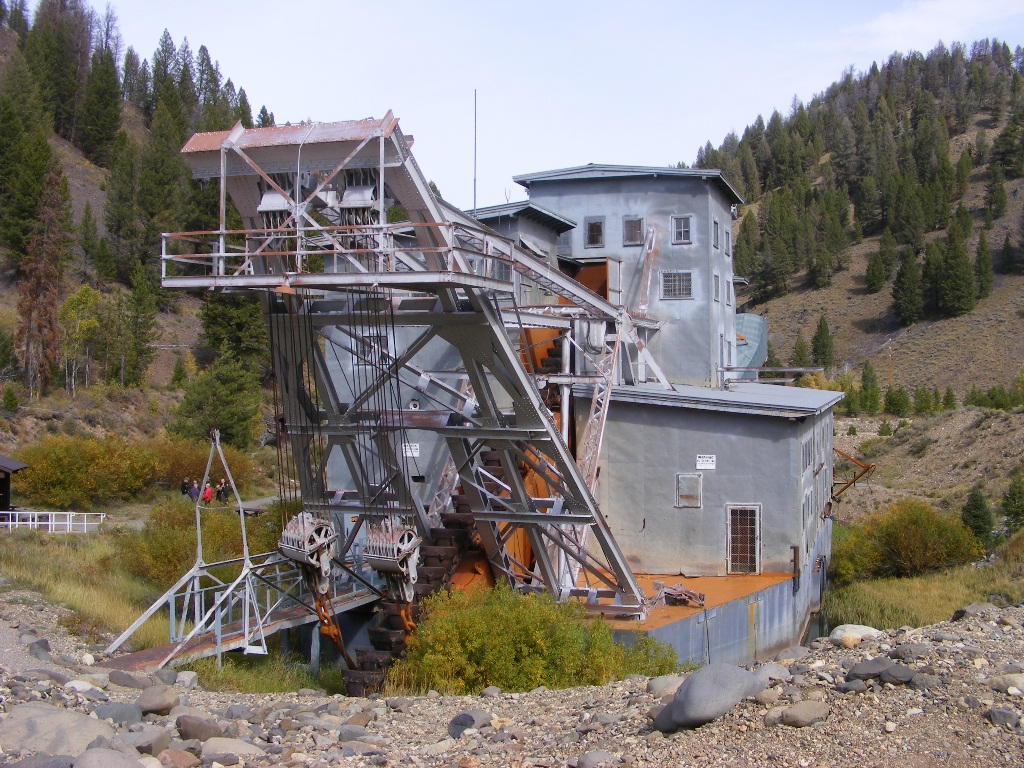
The Yankee Fork gold dredge near Bonanza, which operated into the 1950s.

Bonanza is a ghost town in Custer County, Idaho, United States. It was originally established as a mining town. As of 2005, the land is privately owned but open to the public. Custer has a museum for the gold-rush era where visitors can experience the lives of the citizens of Custer and can search for gold.

Bonanza is the site of one of many Boot Hill cemeteries.

== Climate ==
Climate data for Bonanza (RAWS), Idaho, 1991–2020 normals: 6410ft (1954m)
Month	Jan	Feb	Mar	Apr	May	Jun	Jul	Aug	Sep	Oct	Nov	Dec	Year
Mean daily maximum °F (°C)	35.3 (1.8)	38.7 (3.7)	46.3 (7.9)	51.8 (11.0)	60.8 (16.0)	69.1 (20.6)	80.6 (27.0)	80.1 (26.7)	70.8 (21.6)	56.0 (13.3)	40.9 (4.9)	32.1 (0.1)	55.2 (12.9)
Daily mean °F (°C)	20.4 (−6.4)	22.9 (−5.1)	30.6 (−0.8)	36.7 (2.6)	45.4 (7.4)	52.2 (11.2)	60.1 (15.6)	58.9 (14.9)	51.0 (10.6)	39.9 (4.4)	27.3 (−2.6)	18.5 (−7.5)	38.7 (3.7)
Mean daily minimum °F (°C)	5.6 (−14.7)	7.0 (−13.9)	14.9 (−9.5)	22.2 (−5.4)	29.9 (−1.2)	35.2 (1.8)	39.7 (4.3)	37.7 (3.2)	31.2 (−0.4)	23.9 (−4.5)	13.6 (−10.2)	4.7 (−15.2)	22.1 (−5.5)
Source: XMACIS2

== See also ==
- Land of the Yankee Fork State Park
