= Gold dredge =

Machine to extract gold from bodies of water

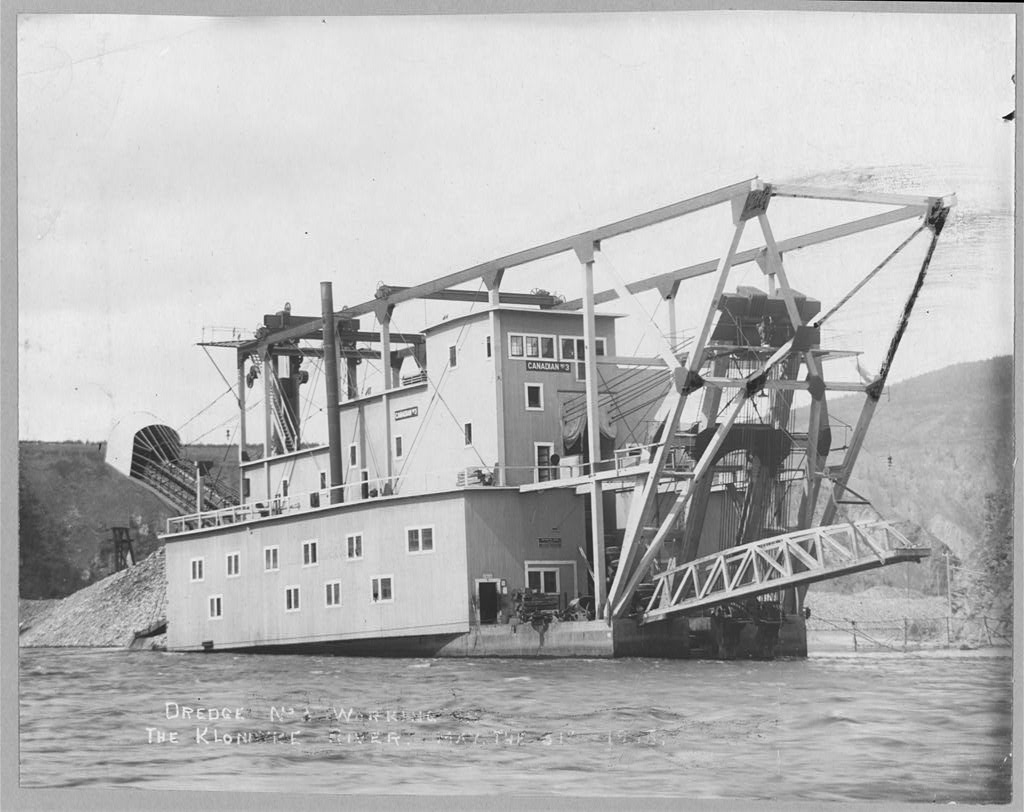
Gold Dredge, Klondike River, Canada, 1915

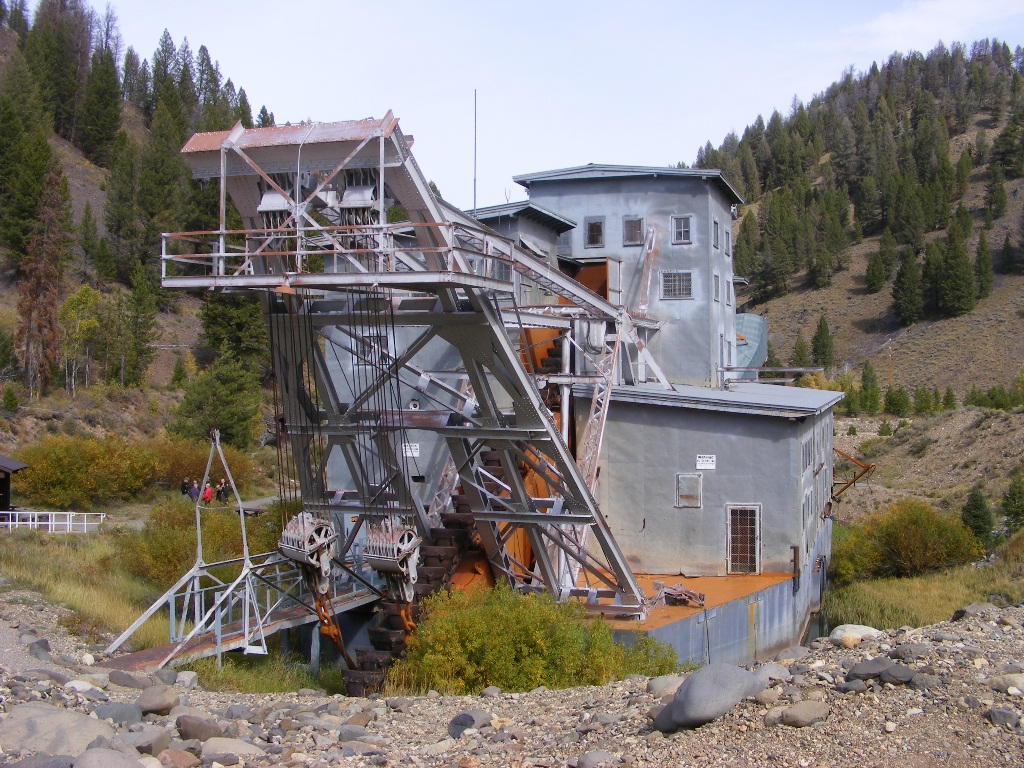
The Yankee Fork dredge near Bonanza, Idaho, which operated into the 1950s.

A gold dredge is a placer mining machine that extracts gold from sand, gravel, and dirt using water and mechanical methods. Original gold dredges were large, multi-story machines built in the first half of the 1900s. In modern times the term refers to small suction machines marketed as "gold dredges" to individuals seeking gold.

== Concept ==
The basic concept of retrieving gold via placer mining has not changed since antiquity. The concept is that the gold in sand or soil will settle to the bottom because gold is heavy/dense, and dirt, sand and rock will wash away, leaving the gold behind. The original methods to perform placer mining involved gold panning, sluice boxes, and rockers. Each method involves washing sand, gravel and dirt in water. Gold then settles to the bottom of the pan, or into the bottom of the riffles of the sluice box.

A gold dredge operates in a similar manner but on a larger scale. A large gold dredge uses a mechanical method to excavate material (sand, gravel, dirt, etc.) using steel "buckets" on a circular, continuous "bucketline" at the front end of the dredge. The material is then sorted/sifted using water. On large gold dredges, the buckets dump the material into a steel rotating cylinder (a specific type of trommel called "the screen") that is sloped downward toward a rubber belt (the stacker) that carries away oversize material (rocks) and dumps the rocks behind the dredge. The cylinder has many holes in it to allow undersized material (including gold) to fall into a sluice box. The material that is washed or sorted away is called tailings. The rocks deposited behind the dredge (by the stacker) are called "tailing piles." The holes in the screen were intended to screen out rocks (e.g., 3/4 inch holes in the screen sent anything larger than 3/4 inch to the stacker). Usually operating as a floating on gold-rich floodplains, historic dredges could be as large as a ship and were run in a similar manner.

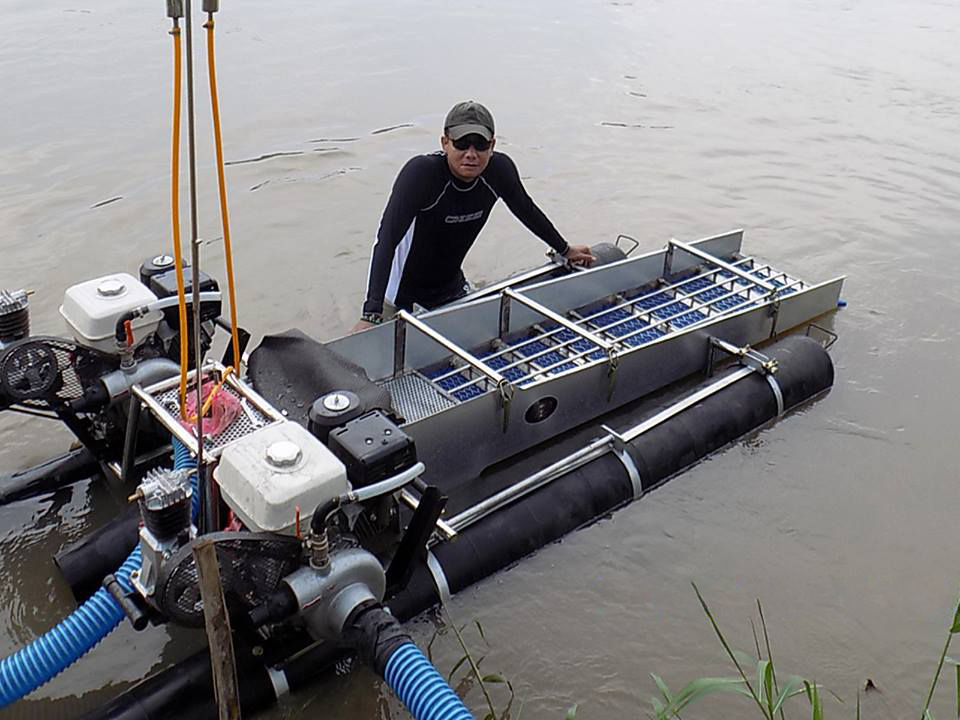
Professional gold miner using an advanced dredge system. Sumatra. Indonesia. May 2015.

Gold dredges are an important tool of gold miners around the world. They allow profitable mining at relatively low operational costs. Even though the concept is simple in principle, dredges can be engineered in different ways allowing to catch different sizes of gold specimen. Hence the efficiency of gold dredges differs greatly depending on its specifications.

== History ==
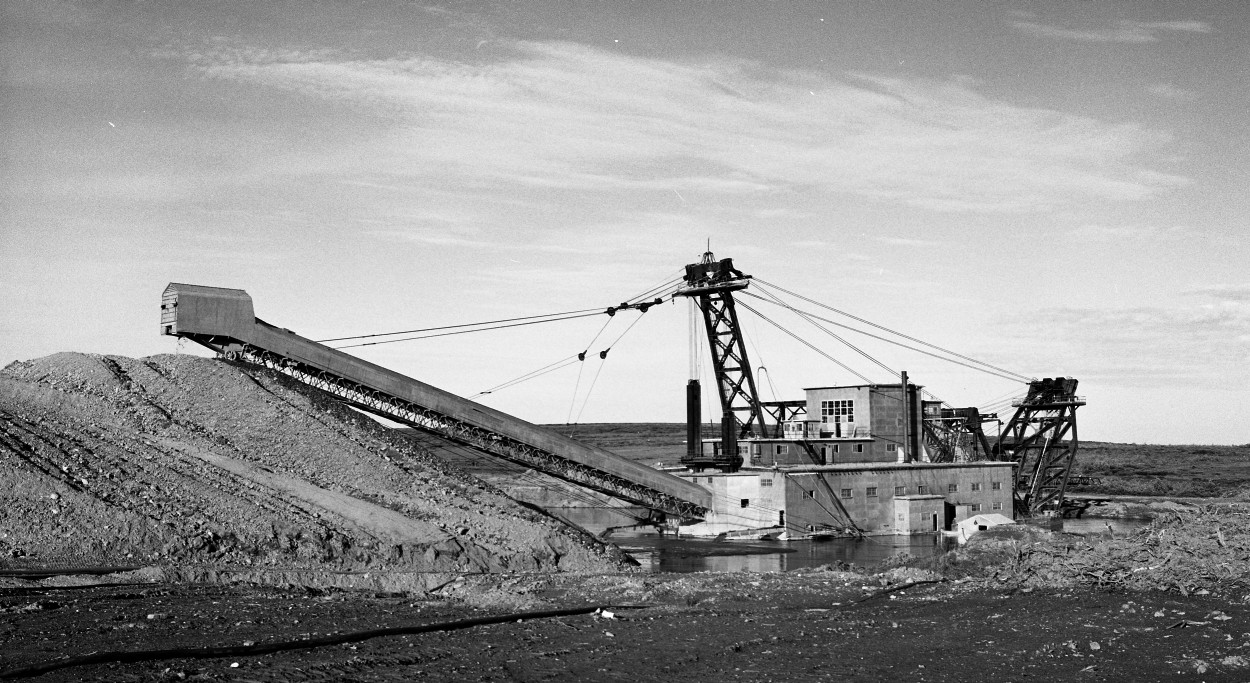
Gold Dredge operating in Nome, Alaska in 1993

By the mid to late 1850s the easily accessible placer gold in California was gone, but much gold remained deeper than shovel-equipped miners could dig. This necessitated more industrial processes to exploit the remaining reserves: giant machines and giant companies. Floating dredges scooped up millions of tons of river gravels, as steam and electrical power became available in the 1890s. Dredging operations left large ridges of tailings throughout floodplains in northern California.

The last giant gold dredge in California was the Natomas Number 6 dredge operating in Folsom, California that ceased operations on 12 Feb 1962 as cost of operation began exceeding the value of the gold recovered. Many of these large dredges still exist today in state-sponsored heritage areas (Sumpter Valley Gold Dredge), or tourist attractions (Dredge No. 4 National Historic Site of Canada).

Gold dredges were used in New Zealand from the 1860s, although the earlier dredges were of primitive design and not very successful. Much of the New Zealand dredge technology was developed locally. The first really successful bucket dredge for gold mining was that of Choie Sew Hoy, also known as Charles Sew Hoy, in 1889. This dredge was able work river banks and flats, as well as the bottoms of streams. It became the prototype for many similar dredges, and led to a boom in gold dredging in the South Island; in Otago rivers like the Shotover River, Clutha River and the Molyneaux River, and in West Coast rivers like the Grey River (where the last gold dredge worked until 2004).

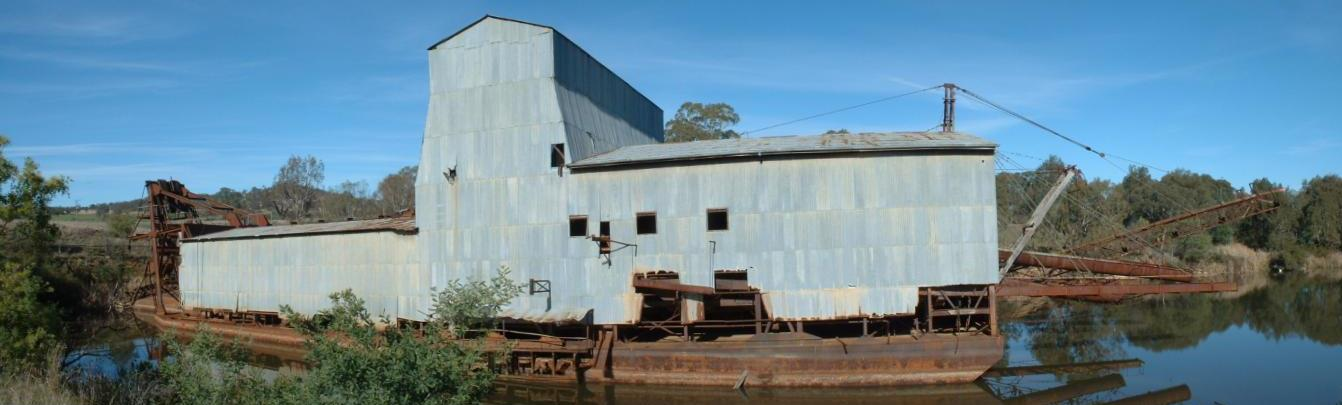
Gold Dredge that was in use in Eldorado, Victoria until 1954

A New Zealand born mining entrepreneur, Charles Lancelot Garland, brought the technology to New South Wales, Australia, launching the first dredge there, in March 1899, resulting in a major revival of the alluvial gold mining industry. Gold dredges also operated, extensively, in Victoria and in Queensland. Dredges were also used to mine placer deposits of other minerals, such as tin ore. In later years, some dredges were electrically powered. A gold dredge was working at Porcupine Flat, near Maldon, Victoria, until 1984.

From Australia, in turn, gold dredging technology spread to New Guinea, at the time an Australian territory, in the 1930s. Due to the remote locations of the goldfields and absence of roads in New Guinea, parts of dredges were carried to site by air and the dredge was assembled there.

== Today ==
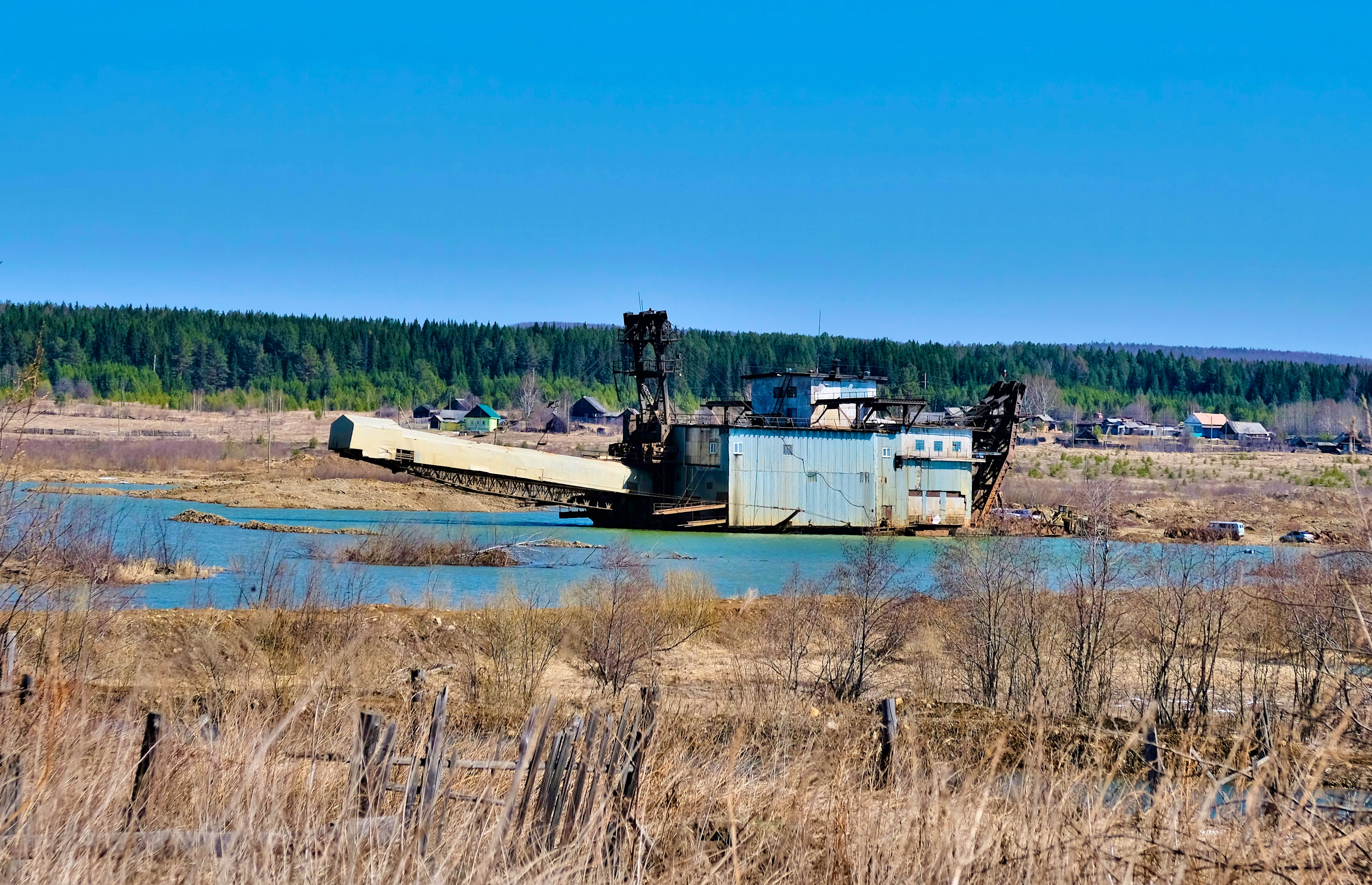
Gold dredge on the Is River, Russia, 2019

In the late 1960s and through today, dredging has returned as a popular form of gold mining. Advances in technology allow a small dredge to be carried by a single person to a remote location and profitably process gravel banks on streams that previously were inaccessible to the giant dredges of the 1930s.

Today dredges are versatile and popular consisting of both floating surface dredges that use a vacuum to suck gravel from the bottom and submersible dredges. Large dredges are still operating in several countries of South America (Peru, Brasil, Guyana, Colombia), Asia (Russia, China, Mongolia Papua-New Guinea) and Africa (Sierra Leone). In 2015, gold miner Tony Beets reconstructed a 70-year-old dredge (as seen in the popular TV series, Gold Rush, on the Discovery channel.). As of 2016, this is the only operating large dredge in the Klondike. However, he is currently working on fixing up a second dredge 33% larger than the first one. In Season 7 Episode 20, titled Dredge vs Washplant, it was shown that in a 2-day test the running costs of the dredge were approximately 25% of those of running a washplant and feeding it with heavy equipment.

Environmental impact studies show no clear positive benefits from suction dredging and potential negative impacts on stream systems. Small scale suction dredging in rivers and streams remains a controversial land management topic and the subject of much political turmoil.
