= St. Paul's Anglican Church (Dawson City) =

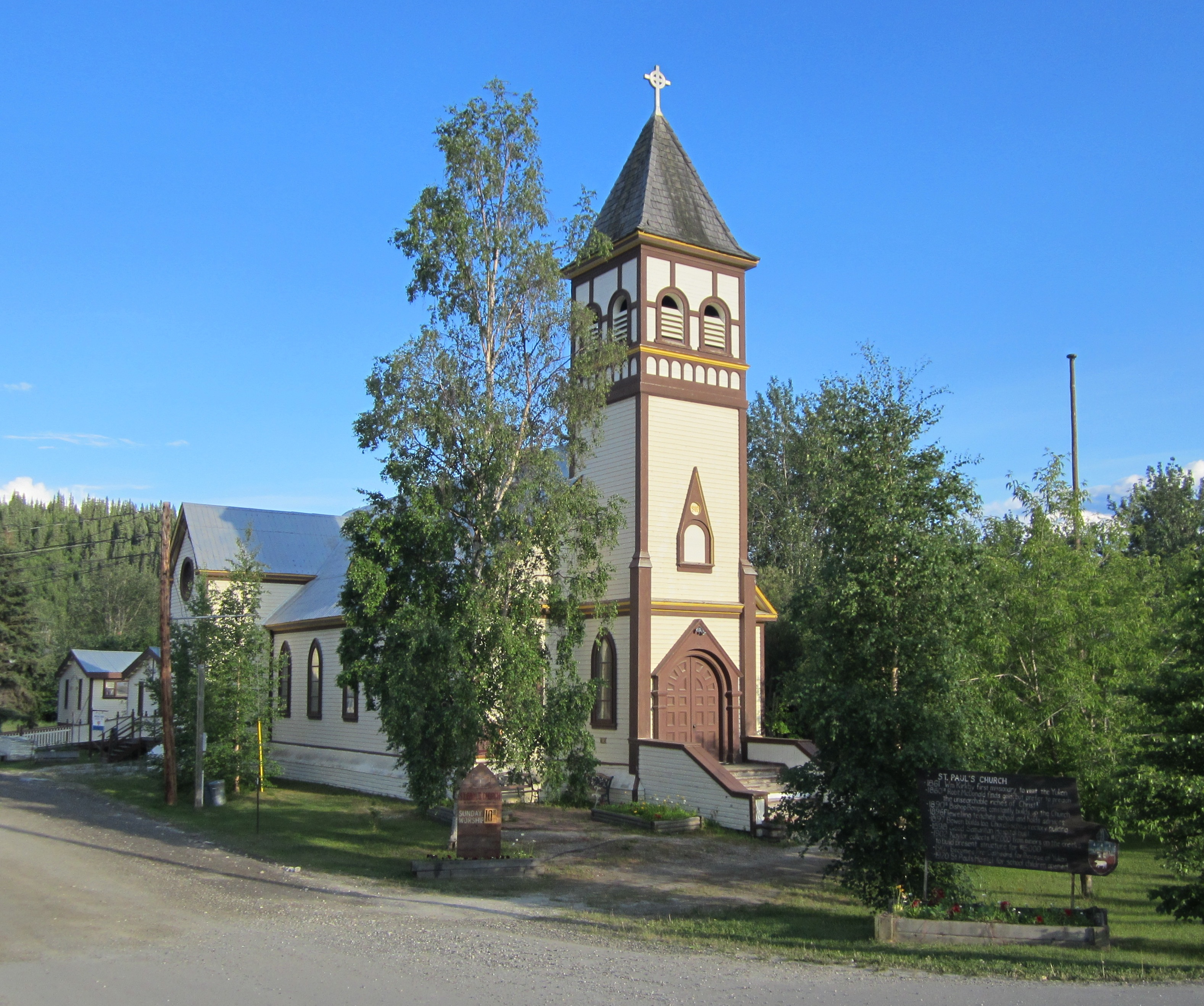
- St. Paul's Anglican Church
- 64.0588°N 139.4382°W
- Location: Dawson City, Yukon
- Country: Canada
- Denomination: Anglican Church of Canada
- Website: anglican.yukon.net

History
- Former name: St. Paul's Anglican Cathedral
- Status: Parish church
- Dedication: Saint Paul

Architecture
- Functional status: Operational seasonally (summer only)
- Designated: 1989
- Architect: James G. Purden
- Architectural type: Wood Frame
- Style: Carpenter Gothic
- Completed: 1902
- Construction cost: $15,000

Administration
- Province: British Columbia and Yukon
- Diocese: Yukon
- Parish: St. Paul's

Clergy
- Priest: The Ven. Laurie Munro

National Historic Site of Canada
- Official name: St. Paul's Anglican Church National Historic Site of Canada
- Designated: 1989

St. Paul's Anglican Church is a historic Carpenter Gothic style Anglican church building located on the corner of Front and Church streets in Dawson City, Yukon, Canada. Built of wood in 1902, it once served as the cathedral of the Anglican Diocese of Yukon until the diocesan see was moved to Whitehorse in 1953. Its steep pitched roof, its pointed arch entry through its belfry tower and its lancet windows are typical of Carpenter Gothic churches. St. Paul's was designated a National Historic Site of Canada on June 1, 1989.

St. Paul's is still an active parish in the Diocese of Yukon. The Ven. Laurie Munro is its incumbent priest, while the Rev. Percy Henry is its deacon. Lay Ministers are Mabel Henry, Shirley Pennell and Betty Davidson.
