= National Register of Historic Places listings in Latah County, Idaho =

Location of Latah County in Idaho

This is a list of the National Register of Historic Places listings in Latah County, Idaho.

This is intended to be a complete list of the properties and districts on the National Register of Historic Places in Latah County, Idaho, United States. Latitude and longitude coordinates are provided for many National Register properties and districts; these locations may be seen together in a map.

There are 59 properties and districts listed on the National Register in the county.

This National Park Service list is complete through NPS recent listings posted September 25, 2026.

== Current listings ==
	Name on the Register	Image	Date listed	Location	City or town	Description
1	Abram A. Adams House	Abram A. Adams House	April 24, 2017 (#100000908)	191 State St. 46°34′36″N 116°42′35″W	Juliaetta	
2	Administration Building, University of Idaho	Administration Building, University of Idaho	February 14, 1978 (#78001072)	University of Idaho campus 46°43′32″N 117°00′40″W	Moscow	Original building burned in 1906; Constructed 1907–09 (main)
3	American Legion Cabin	American Legion Cabin	September 11, 1986 (#86002197)	Alternate U.S. Route 95; 46°55′16″N 116°53′25″W	Potlatch	
4	Bank of Juliaetta	Bank of Juliaetta	January 15, 1998 (#97001649)	301 Main St. 46°34′41″N 116°42′25″W	Juliaetta	
5	Bethany Memorial Chapel	Bethany Memorial Chapel	December 6, 1979 (#79000798)	Kendrick-Deary Highway; 46°39′51″N 116°37′25″W	Kendrick	
6	Boarding House	Boarding House	September 11, 1986 (#86002199)	850 Pine St. 46°55′28″N 116°54′03″W	Potlatch	
7	Axel Bohman House	Axel Bohman House	August 10, 2011 (#11000523)	116 N. Main St. 46°44′19″N 116°46′17″W	Troy	
8	Ole Bohman House	Ole Bohman House	May 22, 2013 (#13000293)	114 N. Main St. 46°44′19″N 116°46′16″W	Troy	
9	Bovill Opera House	Bovill Opera House	January 27, 2010 (#09001280)	412 2nd Ave. 46°51′34″N 116°23′42″W	Bovill	
10	Harry and Fern Campbell House	Harry and Fern Campbell House	December 3, 2018 (#100003175)	101 E 4th St. 46°44′09″N 116°46′06″W	Troy	
11	Commercial Historic District	Commercial Historic District	September 11, 1986 (#86002201)	Roughly Pine St. between 7th and 5th Sts. 46°55′17″N 116°54′04″W	Potlatch	
12	Cordelia Lutheran Church	Cordelia Lutheran Church	August 31, 1995 (#95001058)	Danielson Rd., south of the junction with Genesee-Troy Rd. 46°39′37″N 116°53′50″W	Moscow	
13	Mason Cornwall House	Mason Cornwall House	December 2, 1977 (#77000465)	308 S. Hayes St. 46°43′56″N 116°59′17″W	Moscow	
14	Cox Barn	Cox Barn	February 1, 2010 (#09001281)	1290 American Ridge Rd. 46°36′23″N 116°42′52″W	Kendrick	
15	Davids' Building	Davids' Building	December 11, 1979 (#79000799)	3rd and Main Sts. 46°43′56″N 117°00′04″W	Moscow	
16	Deary Garage	Deary Garage	January 25, 2024 (#100009873)	307 Main Street; 46°47′59″N 116°33′40″W	Deary	
17	Deesten Farmstead	Deesten Farmstead	April 2, 2008 (#08000250)	3611 U.S. Route 95, S. 46°40′09″N 117°01′41″W	Moscow	
18	First Methodist Church	First Methodist Church	October 5, 1978 (#78001073)	322 E. 3rd St. 46°43′57″N 116°59′51″W	Moscow	
19	Fort Russell Neighborhood Historic District	Fort Russell Neighborhood Historic District	November 26, 1980 (#80001329)	Roughly bounded by Jefferson, D, Hayes, and 3rd Sts. 46°44′06″N 116°59′43″W	Moscow	
20	Four-Room House	Four-Room House	September 11, 1986 (#86002204)	1015 Pine St. 46°55′33″N 116°54′01″W	Potlatch	
21	Freeze Community Church	Freeze Community Church	May 3, 1990 (#90000679)	W. Freeze Rd., 1 mile (1.6 km) west of U.S. Route 95; 46°57′46″N 116°56′59″W	Potlatch	
22	Genesee Exchange Bank	Genesee Exchange Bank	January 8, 1979 (#79000796)	Walnut and Fir Sts. 46°33′03″N 116°55′32″W	Genesee	
23	Hotel Bovill	Hotel Bovill	June 23, 1994 (#94000629)	602 Park St. (State Highway 3); 46°51′39″N 116°23′47″W	Bovill	
24	Hotel Moscow	Hotel Moscow	November 30, 1978 (#78001074)	4th and Main Sts. 46°43′55″N 117°00′07″W	Moscow	North of Friendship Square
25	Hotel Rietmann	Hotel Rietmann	November 29, 2001 (#01001302)	525–529 S. Main St. 46°44′03″N 116°46′01″W	Troy	
26	Kappa Sigma Fraternity, Gamma Theta Chapter	Kappa Sigma Fraternity, Gamma Theta Chapter	September 3, 1996 (#96000945)	918 Blake Ave. 46°43′35″N 117°00′29″W	Moscow	
27	Kendrick Downtown Historic District	Kendrick Downtown Historic District	January 2, 2018 (#100001920)	Generally bounded by 3rd, & S Kirby Sts., original NPRR alignment & grade rising N of E Main St. 46°36′49″N 116°39′01″W	Kendrick	
28	Kendrick Fraternal Temple	Kendrick Fraternal Temple	March 27, 2013 (#13000108)	614 E. Main St. 46°36′51″N 116°39′00″W	Kendrick	
29	Kenworthy Theatre	Kenworthy Theatre	November 29, 2001 (#01001305)	508 S. Main St. 46°43′51″N 117°00′04″W	Moscow	
30	Thomas Kirby House	Thomas Kirby House	April 1, 1999 (#99000414)	102 N. 9th St. 46°36′51″N 116°38′49″W	Kendrick	
31	Russell Lawrence Farmstead	Russell Lawrence Farmstead	December 1, 2011 (#11000862)	5471 ID 8; 46°47′58″N 116°29′30″W	Deary	part of the Agricultural Properties of Latah County, Idaho MPS
32	Almon Asbury Lieuallen House	Almon Asbury Lieuallen House	January 3, 1978 (#78001075)	101 S. Almon St. 46°44′01″N 117°00′16″W	Moscow	
33	W. J. McConnell House	W. J. McConnell House	November 21, 1974 (#74000743)	110 S. Adams St. 46°44′00″N 116°59′48″W	Moscow	
34	McConnell–McGuire Building	McConnell–McGuire Building	February 7, 1978 (#78001076)	Main and 1st Sts. 46°44′01″N 117°00′04″W	Moscow	
35	Memorial Gymnasium	Memorial Gymnasium	October 5, 1977 (#77000466)	University of Idaho campus 46°43′35″N 117°00′50″W	Moscow	Opened 98 years ago in 1928
36	Moscow Carnegie Library	Moscow Carnegie Library	June 18, 1979 (#79000800)	110 S. Jefferson St. 46°44′00″N 116°59′54″W	Moscow	
37	Moscow Downtown Historic District	Moscow Downtown Historic District	July 22, 2005 (#05000710)	Generally bounded by 1st St., 6th St., Washington St., and the alley between Main and Jackson; 46°43′55″N 117°00′05″W	Moscow	
38	Moscow High School	Moscow High School	May 5, 1992 (#92000416)	410 E. 3rd St. 46°43′58″N 116°59′47″W	Moscow	1912 Center; high school until 1939, then junior high until 1959
39	Moscow Post Office and Courthouse	Moscow Post Office and Courthouse	July 3, 1973 (#73000686)	Washington and 3rd Sts. 46°43′58″N 116°59′59″W	Moscow	Moscow City Hall
40	Mountain Home Grange Hall	Mountain Home Grange Hall	September 29, 2021 (#100007014)	1044 Mountain Home Rd. 47°00′28″N 116°56′26″W	Potlatch vicinity	
41	Nob Hill Historic District	Nob Hill Historic District	September 11, 1986 (#86002206)	Roughly bounded by 4th, Spruce, 3rd, and Cedar Sts. 46°55′10″N 116°53′52″W	Potlatch	
42	Nordby Farmstead	Nordby Farmstead	May 15, 2009 (#09000293)	1301 Old U.S. Route 95; 46°33′52″N 116°54′34″W	Genesee	
43	Nu Art Theatre	Nu Art Theatre	November 29, 2001 (#01001304)	516 S. Main St. 46°43′50″N 117°00′04″W	Moscow	
44	Ridenbaugh Hall	Ridenbaugh Hall	September 14, 1977 (#77000467)	University of Idaho campus 46°43′28″N 117°00′32″W	Moscow	
45	St. Joseph's Catholic Church	St. Joseph's Catholic Church	November 17, 1982 (#82000351)	301 1st Avenue; 46°51′30″N 116°23′46″W	Bovill	
46	Sigma Alpha Epsilon Fraternity House	Sigma Alpha Epsilon Fraternity House	December 2, 1993 (#93001335)	920 Deakin St. 46°43′34″N 117°00′23″W	Moscow	
47	Skattaboe Block	Skattaboe Block	May 22, 1978 (#78001077)	Main and 4th Sts. 46°43′54″N 117°00′07″W	Moscow	South of Friendship Square
48	Arthur Snow House	Arthur Snow House	May 5, 2009 (#09000294)	2949 Clyde Rd. 46°41′36″N 117°00′39″W	Moscow	
49	Edward and Ida Soncarty Barn	Edward and Ida Soncarty Barn	April 2, 2008 (#08000251)	1671 Deep Creek Rd. 47°01′44″N 116°53′13″W	Potlatch	
50	Sperry Bridge	Sperry Bridge	October 7, 2024 (#100010900)	Sperry Grade Road; 46°36′44″N 116°39′28″W	Kendrick	
51	Joseph A. Terteling House	Joseph A. Terteling House	September 11, 1986 (#86002208)	1015 Fir St. 46°55′33″N 116°54′05″W	Potlatch	
52	Three-Room House	Three-Room House	September 11, 1986 (#86002210)	940 Cedar St. 46°55′30″N 116°53′54″W	Potlatch	
53	Troy Downtown Historic District	Troy Downtown Historic District	March 11, 2010 (#10000073)	339 S. Main St. through 527 S. Main St. 46°44′05″N 116°46′04″W	Troy	
54	Troy Hospital	Troy Hospital	August 10, 2011 (#11000524)	604 S. Main St. 46°44′03″N 116°45′58″W	Troy	
55	University of Idaho Gymnasium and Armory	University of Idaho Gymnasium and Armory	January 3, 1983 (#83000287)	University of Idaho campus 46°43′35″N 117°00′44″W	Moscow	Art & Architecture South
56	University of Idaho Historic District		October 1, 2026 (#100013497)	875 Perimeter Dr., University of Idaho campus 46°43′31″N 117°01′06″W	Moscow	
57	Vollmer Building	Vollmer Building	January 8, 1979 (#79000797)	Walnut St. 46°33′03″N 116°55′30″W	Genesee	
58	White Spring Ranch	White Spring Ranch	January 6, 2004 (#03001368)	1004 Lorang Rd. Hwy. 95 & Borgen Rd. 46°34′39″N 116°56′58″W	Genesee	
59	Workers' Neighborhood Historic District	Workers' Neighborhood Historic District	September 11, 1986 (#86002211)	Roughly Spruce St. between 8th and 5th 46°55′20″N 116°53′47″W	Potlatch	

== See also ==
- List of National Historic Landmarks in Idaho
- National Register of Historic Places listings in Idaho
