= Bethany Memorial Chapel =

Historic church in Idaho, United States

- U.S. National Register of Historic Places
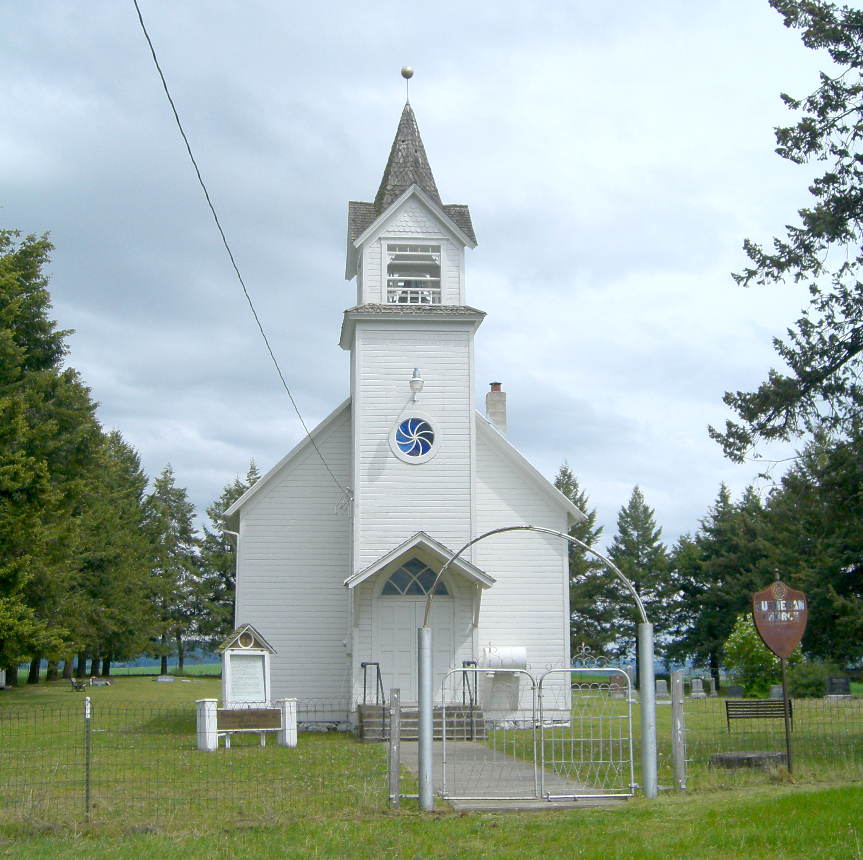
- Location: Kendrick-Deary Hwy., Kendrick (Latah County) Idaho
- Coordinates: 46°39′51″N 116°37′25″W
- Area: 2.9 acres (1.2 ha)
- Built: 1908
- Architectural style: Carpenter Gothic
- NRHP reference No.: 79000798
- Added to NRHP: December 6, 1979

Bethany Memorial Chapel was built by Norwegian homesteaders who settled in the Big Bear Ridge area north of Kendrick in rural Latah County, Idaho. Norwegians who had settled in the area met at the home of Edward Dahl on July 21, 1902, for the purpose of organizing a Lutheran church in the area. In late July 1902, plans were prepared for the building, which was to be constructed on one-half acre of land promised by Edward Jones. However, Jones had sold his land to Halvor Nelson, who then added another one-half acre to the property. Construction of the Carpenter Gothic building began in 1905 and was completed, inside and out, in 1908. Although the interior of the building had not yet been completed, the first service in the church took place on December 26, 1905, when Halvor Lien married Hilda Slind. The pews, altar railing, and pulpit were carved by Eric Leien, a member of the congregation. It was originally named the Evangelical Lutheran Church, Bethany Congregation of Kendrick. There is no longer an active congregation holding services, but the church and cemetery are maintained by community members.

On December 18, 1979, it was added to the National Register of Historic Places.

== See also ==
- National Register of Historic Places listings in Latah County, Idaho
