= Thomas Kirby House =

Historic house in Idaho, United States

- U.S. National Register of Historic Places
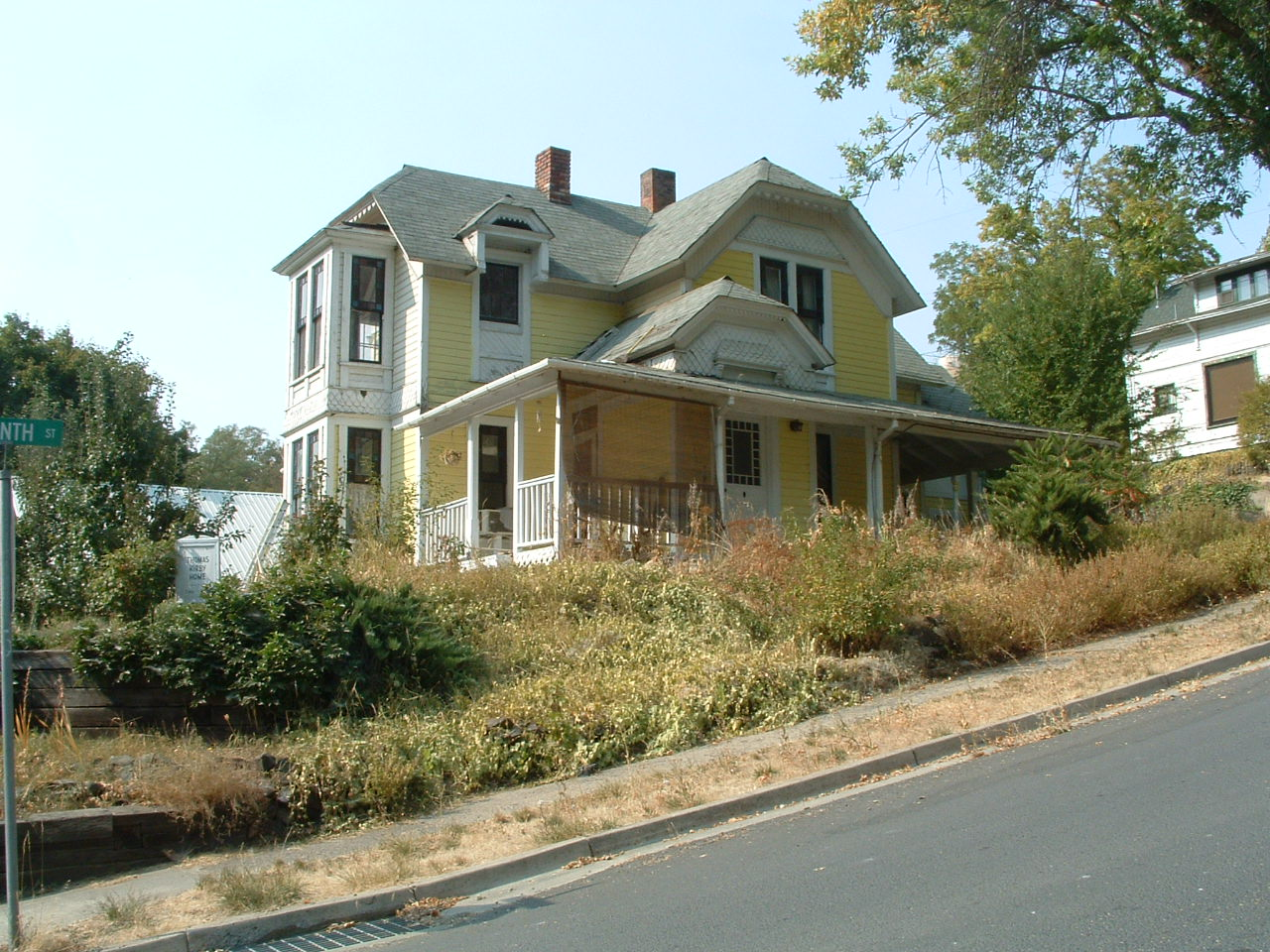

- Location within Idaho Location within the United States
- Location: 102 N. 9th St., Kendrick, Idaho
- Coordinates: 46°36′51″N 116°38′49″W
- Area: less than one acre
- Built: 1889
- Architectural style: Queen Anne
- NRHP reference No.: 99000414
- Added to NRHP: April 1, 1999

The Thomas Kirby House in Kendrick, Idaho was built in 1889 and modified in 1910 and otherwise. It was built for Thomas Kirby, a man highly responsible for the railroads that started in Kendrick and went to Troy, Idaho.

The house is eclectic Queen Anne in style, with elements of Stick and Eastlake architecture. The 1998 NRHP nomination stated it "still commands attention and is significant as one of the best remaining examples of Victorian residential architecture in Idaho's North-Central region."

It was listed on the National Register of Historic Places in 1999.

== See also ==
- National Register of Historic Places listings in Latah County, Idaho
