= Kendrick Fraternal Temple =

- U.S. National Register of Historic Places
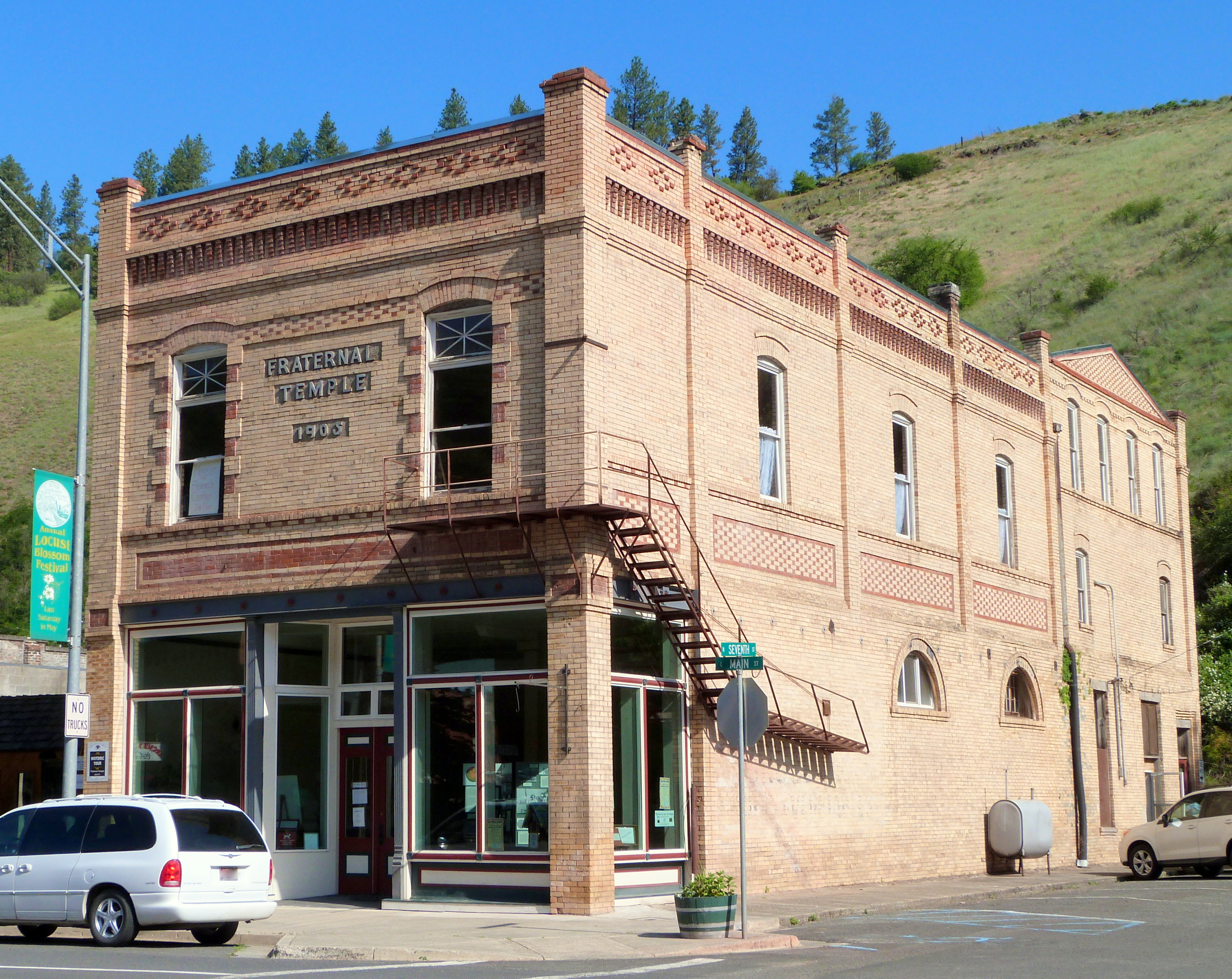

- Location within Idaho Location within the United States
- Location: 614 E. Main, Kendrick, Idaho
- Coordinates: 46°36′51″N 116°39′00″W
- Area: less than one acre
- Built: 1905
- Built by: Collins & Walker
- Architectural style: Early Commercial, Two-Part Commercial Block
- NRHP reference No.: 13000108
- Added to NRHP: March 27, 2013

The Kendrick Fraternal Temple, at 614 E. Main in Kendrick, Idaho, was built in 1905. It was listed on the National Register of Historic Places in 2013.

It was built after a fire in 1904 destroyed much of Kendrick.

It is an Early Commercial, two-part commercial block building, built by contractors Collins and Walker. The south-facing brick building is "one of the most imposing" on Kendrick's main street.

After the 1904 fire, a "Fraternal Temple Company, Limited" was formed and raised $8,000.00 by sale of $10 shares to support construction of a building which would serve all of the fraternal orders existing in Kendrick. These included:

- the Nez Perce Lodge Number 37, which was the local chapter of International Order of Oddfellows, formed in 1889, which had more than 100 male members in 1904, and which also had a Rebekahs organization
- the Knights of Pythias chapter, with 75 members
- the Masonic Lodge, with 45 members by 1904
- the Woodmen of the World chapter and its associated organization, Women's Circle of Woodcraft

Membership probably included persons from an area larger than Kendrick, including from the nearby town of Juliaetta, Idaho.

It also served the Musical Club, the Women's Club, the Baseball Club, and the Commercial Club, and was available for use by other local groups.

In 1940, the Kendrick Grange #413, a chapter of the Order of the Patrons of Husbandry, was established and also used the building.

In 2013, the building was under renovation by the Grange group; it has also been known as Kendrick Grange Hall.
