= Emerson and Lucretia Sensenig House =

Historic house in Boise, Idaho, USA

- U.S. National Register of Historic Places
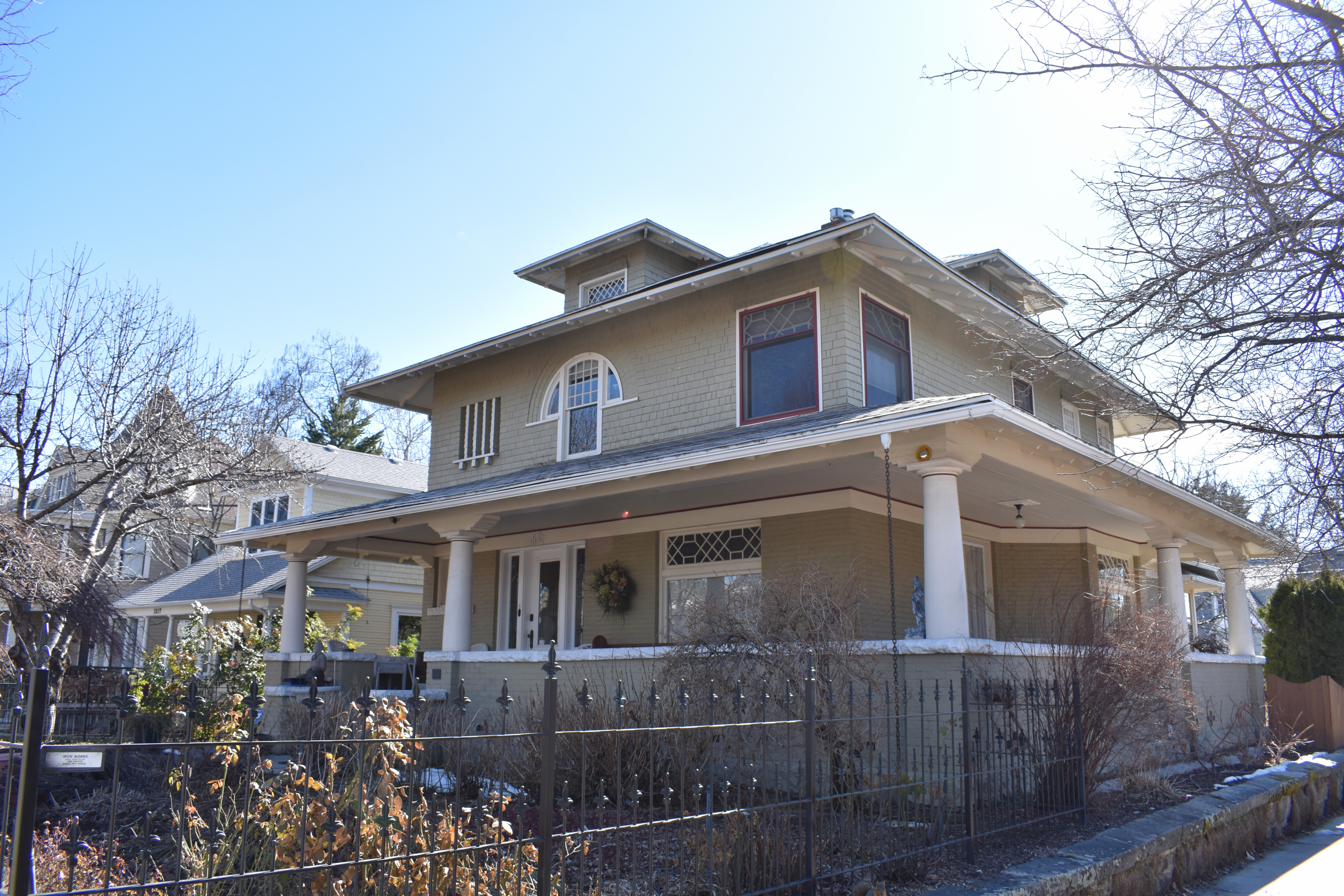
- The Emerson and Lucretia Sensenig House in 2019

- Location within Idaho Location within the United States
- Location: 1519 W. Jefferson St., Boise, Idaho
- Coordinates: 43°37′21″N 116°12′34″W
- Area: less than one acre
- Built: 1905
- Architect: Watson Vernon
- Architectural style: Late 19th And Early 20th Century American Movements, American foursquare
- NRHP reference No.: 96001590
- Added to NRHP: January 16, 1997

The Emerson and Lucretia Sensenig House, also known as the Marjorie Vogel House, is a 2 1/2-story Foursquare house in Boise, Idaho, designed by Watson Vernon and constructed in 1905. The house features a hip roof with centered dormers and a half hip roof over a prominent, wraparound porch. Porch and first-floor walls are brick, and second-floor walls are covered with square shingle veneer. A second-story shadow box with four posts is inset to the left of a Palladian style window, emphasized by three curved rows of shingles. The house was added to the National Register of Historic Places in 1997.

== History ==
Emerson S. and Lucretia C. Sensenig purchased property for the house in 1902 from Charles F. and Katherine O. Koelsch, and they hired architect Watson Vernon to build the 8-room Sensenig House in 1905. After the death of Emerson Sensenig in 1927, the house was purchased by Howard and Alida Stein. The Steins sold the house in 1937 to Marjorie D. Vogel. In 1991 Kathleen Blackburn purchased the house, and it was restored to original condition by Blackburn and her husband.

Emerson Sensenig founded the Boise Cold Storage Co. in 1903. He also helped to found the Boise Brokerage Co., Ltd., in that year, and in 1907 he helped to found the Boise Jobbers Association, an organization of warehouse and cold storage companies located in what is now Boise's South Eighth Street Historic District.

After the death of Emerson Sensenig, Lucretia Sensenig moved to Cleveland.

Architect Watson Vernon designed three other buildings listed on the National Register of Historic Places: Moscow Carnegie Library (1905), Immanuel Lutheran Church (Seattle) (1907), and State Training School for Girls Administration Building (1914).

== See also ==
- Fort Street Historic District
