= McGuire House =

McGuire House may refer to:

- Thomas R. McGuire House, Little Rock, Arkansas, NRHP-listed
- McGuire-Setzer House, Mocksville, North Carolina, listed on the National Register of Historic Places (NRHP) in Davie County, North Carolina
- McGuire House (Tulsa, Oklahoma), a work of architect John T. Blair

== See also ==
- McGuires School, McGuire, Idaho, NRHP-listed
- McConnell-McGuire Building, Moscow, Idaho, NRHP-listed
