= Juliaetta, Idaho =

Juliaetta
- City
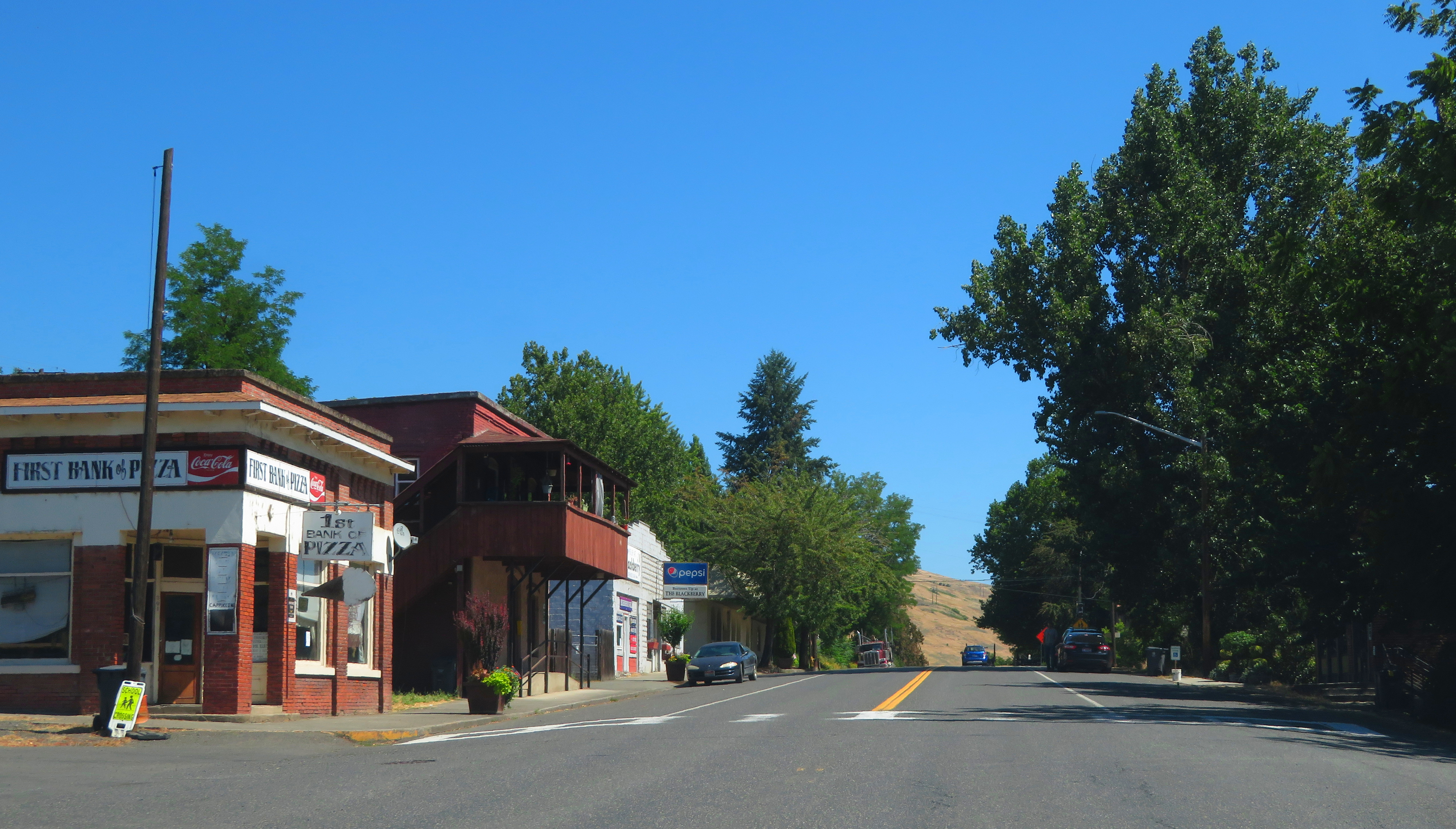
- Main Street

- Seal

- Location of Juliaetta in Latah County, Idaho.

- Location within Idaho Location within the United States
- Coordinates: 46°34′27″N 116°42′35″W
- Country: United States
- State: Idaho
- County: Latah
- Settled: 1878
- Incorporated (town): April 19, 1892

Government
  - Mayor: Richard Groseclose

Area
  - Total: 0.71 sq mi (1.84 km^{2})
  - Land: 0.70 sq mi (1.81 km^{2})
  - Water: 0.012 sq mi (0.03 km^{2})
- Elevation: 1,063 ft (324 m)

Population (2020)
  - Total: 624
  - Density: 861.2/sq mi (332.53/km^{2})
- Time zone: UTC-8 (Pacific (PST))
  - Summer (DST): UTC-7 (PDT)
- ZIP Code: 83535
- Area code: 208
- FIPS code: 16-42130
- GNIS feature ID: 2410155
- Website: cityofjuliaetta.com

Juliaetta is a city in Latah County, Idaho, United States. The town was named after the daughters of an early settler. In 2020, Juliaetta had a population of 624.

== History ==
Juliaetta was originally known as Schupferville, named for Rupert Schupfer who homesteaded the land in 1878. He plotted one-half of his homestead as a town site and operated the first general store. By 1878, the town had a population of 200.

In 1876, Charles Snyder established a post office and named the town after his daughters, Julia and Etta. He was the first postmaster of Juliaetta. The city was incorporated in 1892 when the railroad was extended to that point.

In 1885 the first flour mill was built. The flour was labeled “Pride of the Potlatch” and was shipped all over the west coast of the United States. This business became Juliaetta Milling and Light Company.

By 1889, the town had a bank, a newspaper, a jewelry store, a saddlery store, and a general store. Farmers in the area raised wheat, flax, oats, and hay in addition to fruit trees and large gardens.

The town became incorporated in 1892. Agricultural products were transported via a tram from the ridges around town. By 1902, Juliaetta had two hotels, Grand Central Hotel and Palace Hotel. Dr. Robert Foster Sr. established Foster's School of Healing in 1903. The Juliaetta Cannery employed 100 people seasonally and produced up to 10,000 cans per day. It burned in 1911.

Other businesses operating in Juliaetta in the early 1900s included a mercantile, undertakers, barber, shoeshine services, millinery, confectionery, dressmaker, skating rink, and dance hall. Juliaetta also had an opera house and a theater company.

== Geography ==
Juliaetta is approximately 2 mi (3.2 km) north of the Nez Perce Indian Reservation; the Potlatch River runs parallel to Highway 3 on the east side of Juliaetta.

According to the United States Census Bureau, the city has a total area of 0.73 square miles (1.89 km^{2}), of which, 0.72 square miles (1.86 km^{2}) is land and 0.01 square miles (0.03 km^{2}) is water.

== Demographics ==
Historical population
Census	Pop.	Note	%±
1900	287		—
1910	414		44.3%
1920	427		3.1%
1930	274		−35.8%
1940	337		23.0%
1950	365		8.3%
1960	368		0.8%
1970	423		14.9%
1980	522		23.4%
1990	488		−6.5%
2000	609		24.8%
2010	579		−4.9%
2020	624		7.8%
U.S. Decennial Census

=== 2010 census ===
As of the census of 2010, there were 579 people, 263 households, and 163 families residing in the city. The population density was 804.2 inhabitants per square mile (310.5/km^{2}). There were 294 housing units at an average density of 408.3 units per square mile (157.6 units/km^{2}). The racial makeup of the city was 95.7% White, 0.2% African American, 1.7% Native American, and 2.4% from two or more races. Hispanic or Latino of any race were 1.4% of the population.

There were 263 households, of which 23.6% had children under the age of 18 living with them, 47.5% were married couples living together, 9.5% had a female householder with no husband present, 4.9% had a male householder with no wife present, and 38.0% were non-families. 31.2% of all households were made up of individuals, and 12.9% had someone living alone who was 65 years of age or older. The average household size was 2.20 and the average family size was 2.72.

The median age in the city was 46.8 years. 18.7% of residents were under the age of 18; 6.8% were between the ages of 18 and 24; 22.3% were from 25 to 44; 31.5% were from 45 to 64; and 20.9% were 65 years of age or older. The gender makeup of the city was 49.2% male and 50.8% female.

=== 2000 census ===
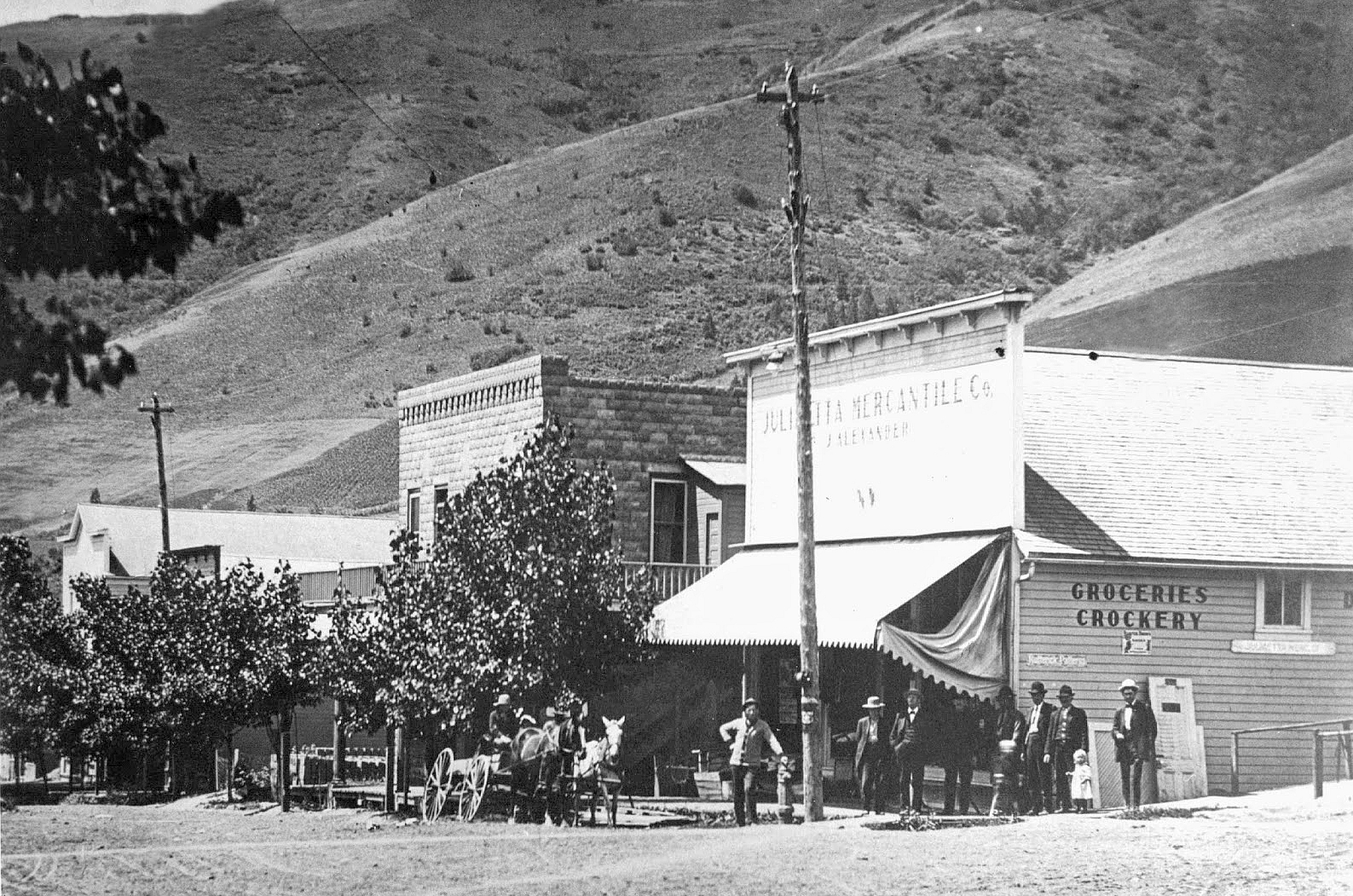
Main Street, circa 1900-1910

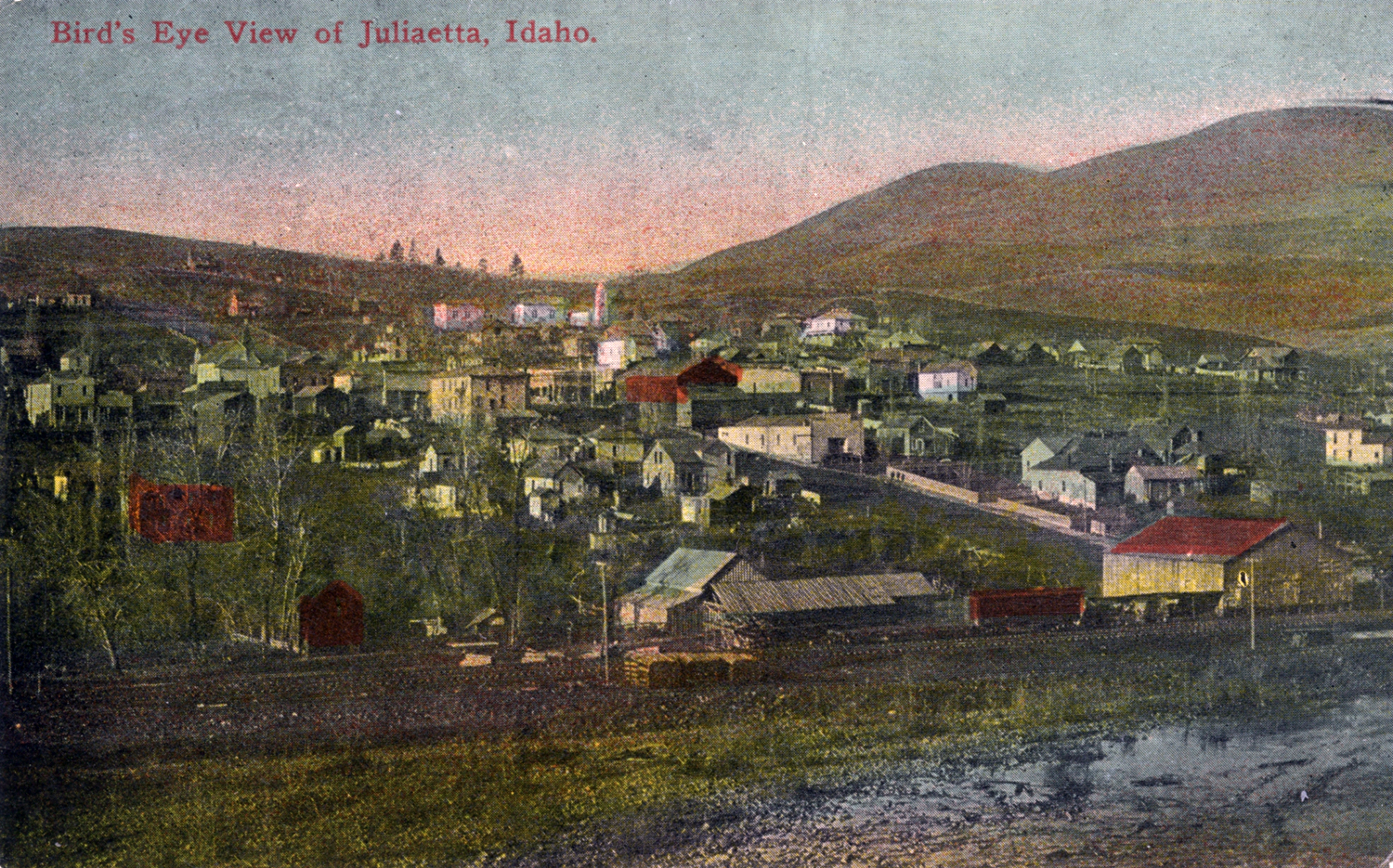
Julietta, 1914

As of the census of 2000, there were 609 people, 255 households, and 175 families residing in the city. The population density was 856.1 inhabitants per square mile (330.5/km^{2}). There were 275 housing units at an average density of 386.6 units per square mile (149.3 units/km^{2}). The racial makeup of the city was 96.72% White, 2.13% Native American, 0.16% Asian, and 0.99% from two or more races. Hispanic or Latino of any race were 0.82% of the population.

There were 255 households, out of which 25.5% had children under the age of 18 living with them, 56.5% were married couples living together, 9.8% had a female householder with no husband present, and 31.0% were non-families. 27.5% of all households were made up of individuals, and 14.5% had someone living alone who was 65 years of age or older. The average household size was 2.39 and the average family size was 2.89.

In the city, the population was spread out, with 24.1% under the age of 18, 7.7% from 18 to 24, 22.8% from 25 to 44, 28.1% from 45 to 64, and 17.2% who were 65 years of age or older. The median age was 41 years. For every 100 females, there were 106.4 males. For every 100 females age 18 and over, there were 101.7 males.

The median income for a household in the city was $33,295, and the median income for a family was $39,250. Males had a median income of $31,875 versus $18,594 for females. The per capita income for the city was $14,606. About 4.2% of families and 12.3% of the population were below the poverty line, including 16.7% of those under age 18 and 5.7% of those age 65 or over.

== Arts and culture ==
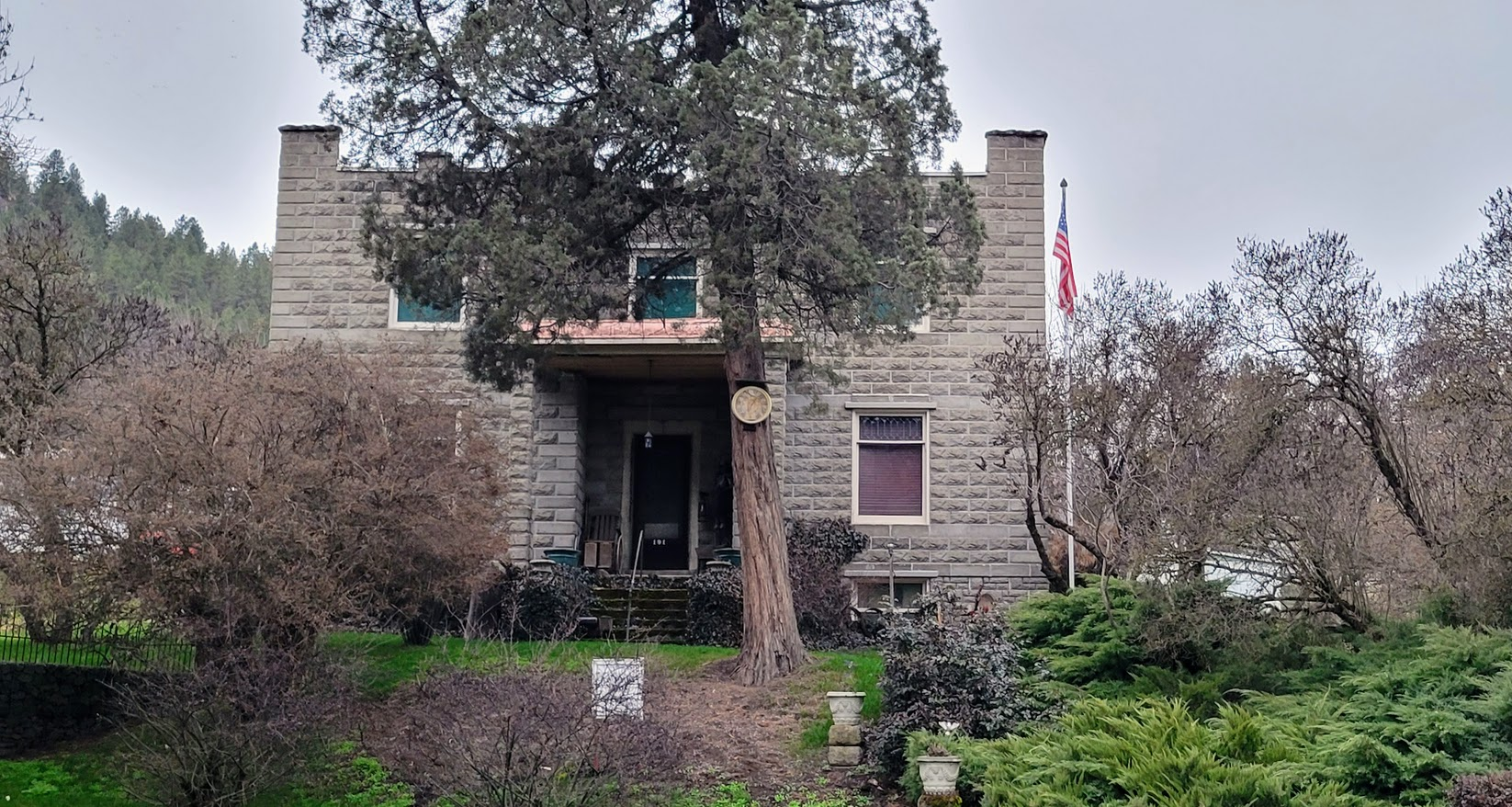
Castle Museum in Juliaetta

Two sites in Juliaetta are listed on the National Register of Historic Places:

- The Bank of Juliaetta, built in 1889, is now a restaurant.
- The Abram A. Adams House, built in 1905 to resemble a Scottish castle, is now a museum.

Juliaetta Community Library, opened in 1977, is part of the Latah County Library District.

== Parks and recreation ==
The Corkill Memorial Trail is a paved 5.3-mile (8.5 km) rail trail along the Potlatch River between Juliaetta and Kendrick, built on a former 1890s Northern Pacific Railway line. The trail ends at Juliaetta Centennial Park and baseball field.

== Government ==
The town of has a mayor, along with four council members, a city treasurer and a clerk. The city employs two maintenance workers.

== Education ==
Juliaetta is in the Kendrick Joint School District; the elementary school is located in Juliaetta, while the high school is in neighboring Kendrick. Combined, they are referred to as Kendrick Joint School District 283.
