= Almon Asbury Lieuallen House =

Historic house in Idaho, United States

- U.S. National Register of Historic Places
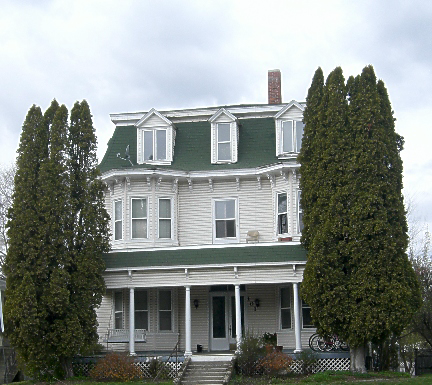
- Lieuallen House 2007

- Location within Idaho Location within the United States
- Interactive map showing the location of Almon Asbury Lieuallen House
- Location: 101 S. Almon St. Moscow (Latah CO) Idaho
- Coordinates: 46°44′01″N 117°00′16″W
- Built: 1884
- Architect: Lieuallen, Almon Asbury
- Architectural style: Victorian Mansard roof
- NRHP reference No.: 78001075
- Added to NRHP: January 3, 1978

The Almon Asbury Lieuallen House was added to the National Register of Historic Places in 1978. Located at 101 S. Almon St. in Moscow, Idaho in Latah County the house was built in 1884. The structure has a mansard roof and two-story bays on either side of the entrance. The structure originally had a smaller covered porch, and the bays were more visible than at present. A small railed balcony atop the porch was accessible by a door on the second floor. That door has been replaced by a window, and the porch expanded to cover the entire east side of the facade. Additional dormer windows have been added on the third floor to provide additional lighting and ventilation for the top floor. The structure has always been used as a residence, first as a family home, then as apartments. It is currently used as multi-family apartments.

The wooden structure was built outside the town of Moscow on his farm and occupied by Almon Asbury Lieuallen and his family. One of the early settlers of Moscow, he operated one of the first stores and was postmaster in 1876. Together with James Deakin, Henry McGregor, and John Russell, he donated one-quarter of the one-hundred and 20 acres (81,000 m^{2}) which became the city center of Moscow.

== See also ==
- National Register of Historic Places listings in Latah County, Idaho

== Notes ==
- "Geographic Names Information System". U.S. Geological Survey. U.S. Department of the Interior. 1979.
