= University of Idaho Historic District =

Historic district in Idaho, United States

- U.S. National Register of Historic Places
- U.S. Historic district
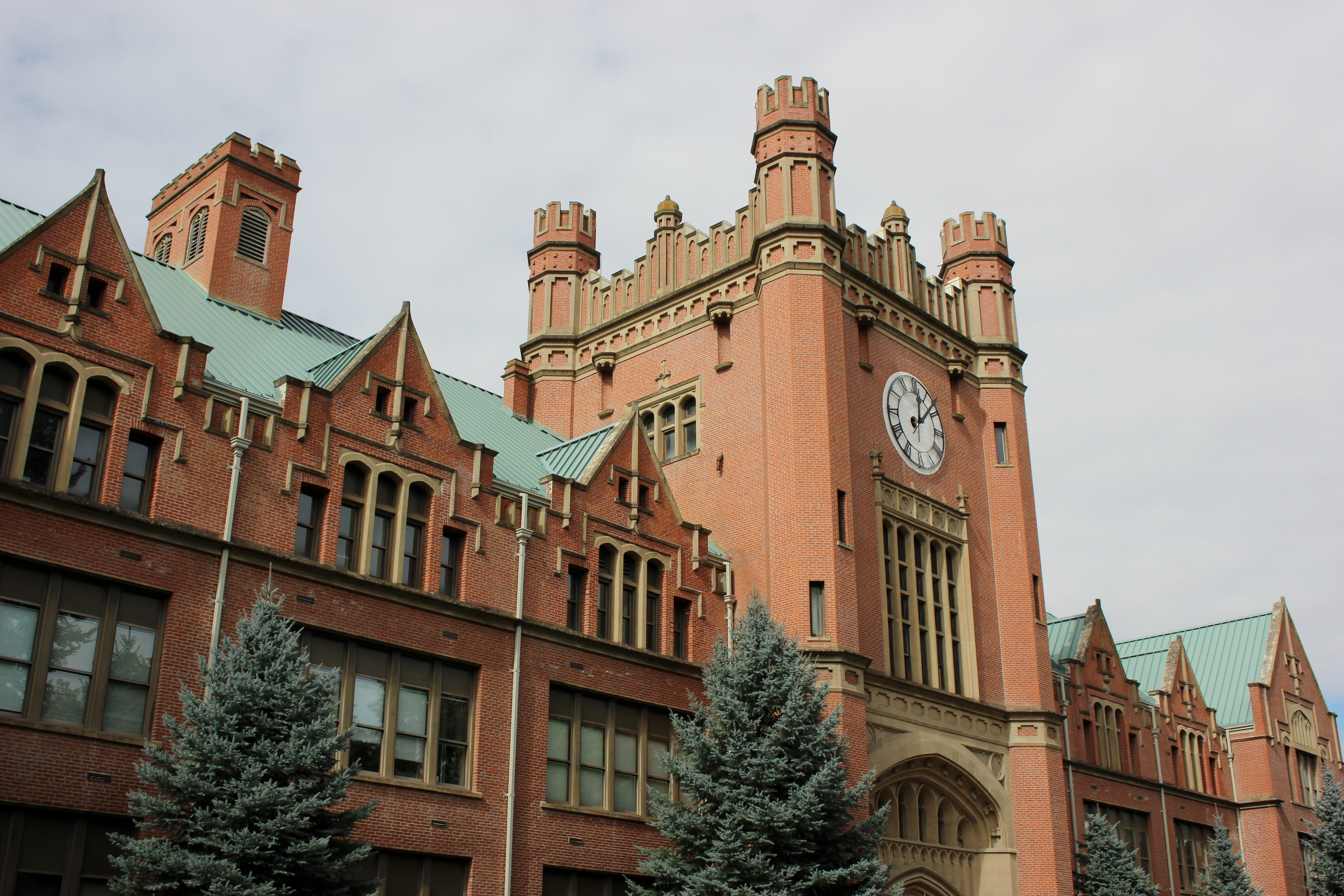
- UI Administration Building, in the district

- Location within Idaho Location within the United States
- Location: Moscow, Idaho United States
- Coordinates: 46°43′33″N 117°00′36″W
- Area: 188 acres (0.76 km^{2})
- Built: 1900-1976
- Architectural style: Tudor Revival, Collegiate Gothic, International Style (architecture), Other
- NRHP reference No.: 100013497
- Added to NRHP: September 30, 2026

The University of Idaho Historic District in Moscow, Idaho was listed on the National Register of Historic Places on September 30, 2026. The district is bounded by Paradise Creek Street (on the north), West Nez Perce Drive (on the south), Stadium Drive, and the university's Greek houses (on the east, where the campus blends into Moscow's street grid). It covers about 188 acres, and includes dozens of structures, including several previously listed individually on the National Register of Historic Places, including the Administration Building, Ridenbaugh Hall (the oldest surviving campus building), and Memorial Gymnasium.

The university campus (and thus the district) contains structures of varying types and vintages, reflecting most of a century of construction. The university's Campus Photographs Collection documents the evolution of architecture, planning, and taste in the built environment..

== See also ==
- University of Idaho
