= Kappa Sigma Fraternity, Gamma Theta Chapter =

- U.S. National Register of Historic Places
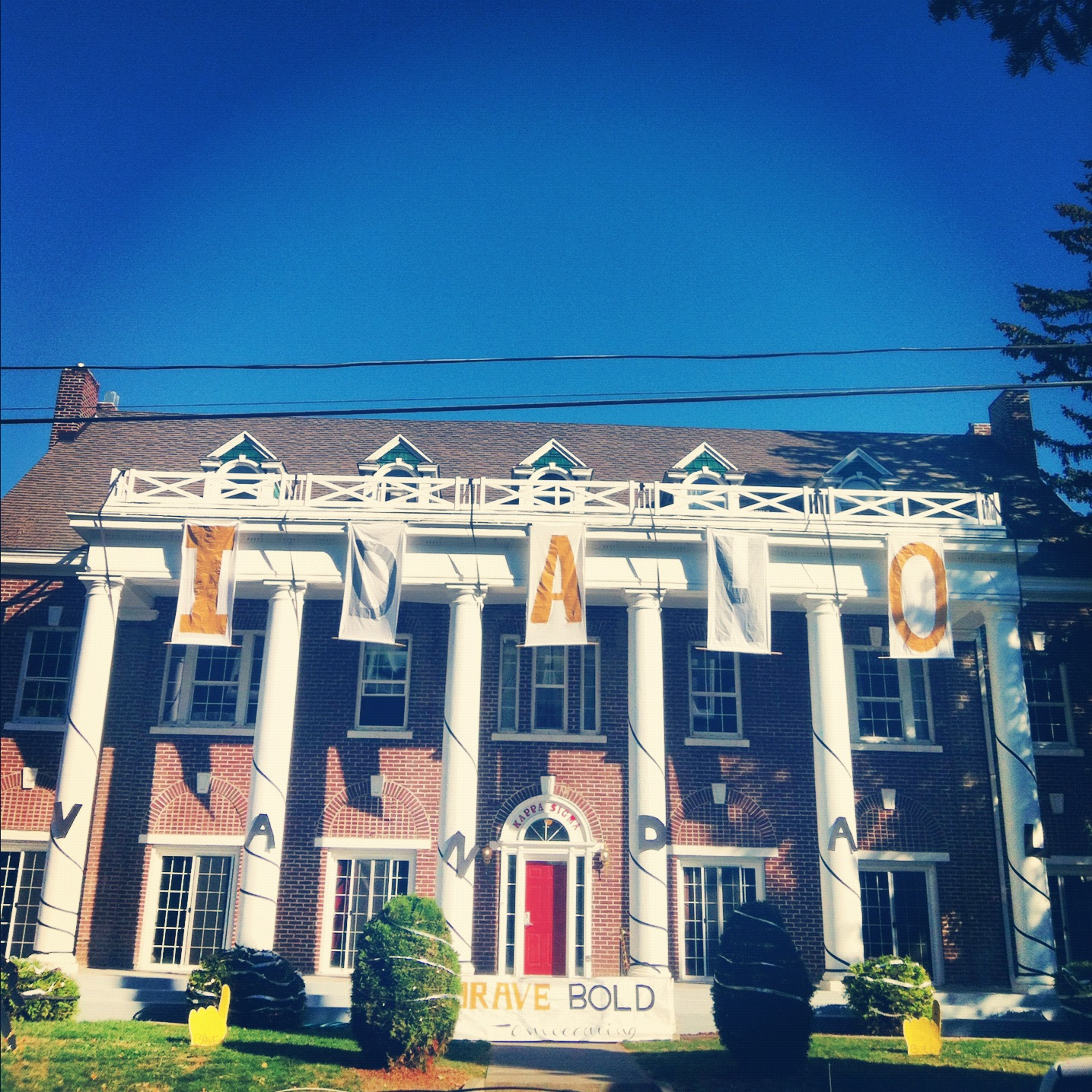

- Location within Idaho Location within the United States
- Location: 918 Blake Street, Moscow, Idaho
- Coordinates: 46°43′35″N 117°00′25″W
- Area: less than one acre
- Built: 1916
- Architectural style: Classical Revival
- NRHP reference No.: 96000945
- Added to NRHP: September 3, 1996

The Kappa Sigma Fraternity, Gamma Theta Chapter is a historic fraternity house in Moscow, Idaho. It was built in 1916 for the Kappa Sigma chapter at the University of Idaho. It is the oldest extant fraternity building at the University of Idaho and in the state of Idaho. The house was listed on the National Register of Historic Places in 1996.

== History ==
Kappa Sigma college social fraternity was founded on September 10, 1869, at the University of Virginia in Charlottesville, Virginia. As of 2025, it is the largest social college fraternity in the world. The fraternity chartered its Gamma Theta chapter at the University of Idaho in Moscow, Idaho on September 30, 1906. Gamma Theta was the first Kappa Sigma chapter established in the state of Idaho. The chapter was formed from the local fraternity Sigma Delta Alpha, which had 21 active members in 1903.

Gamma Theta established a building fund at First National Bank in Moscow by 1911. In February 1912, the chapter purchased a lot on 918 Blake Street, facing west toward the university's administration building, for $1,100 ($36,698 in 2024). This was followed by a capital campaign that yielded $12,000 ($381,908 in 2024) by the end of 1915. In January 1916, the fraternity hired an Kirkland Cutter, a noted architect who worked extensively in the Pacific Northwest and California, to design their chapter house.

Construction of the chapter house was completed in 1916, and it has been continuously occupied by Kappa Sigma. It is the oldest extant fraternity building at the University of Idaho and in the state of Idaho. It was listed on the National Register of Historic Places on September 3, 1996, as Kappa Sigma Fraternity, Gamma Theta Chapter.

== Architecture ==
The house was designed by architect Kirtland Cutter in the Classical Revival architectural style, which recalled the fraternity's Southern origins. It also has aspects of American academic architecture. The house is symmetrical with two and one-half stories. It has a red brick veneer, a full facade porch with six wooden Doric columns, five pedimented dormers, and a gabled roof. Its entrance is flanked by three tall windows on each side, and has a fanlight and keystone above the door and sidelights.

Its interior has been altered by renovations; however, the first-floor north parlor retains its original style. Its foyer and staircase are paneled in mahogany. On either side of the entrance, two parlors face the front porch; these featured beamed ceilings, dark mahogany paneling, and built-in bookcases. Along with the parlors, the first floor also had a game room, chapter office, and reception room. The basement originally included the dining room, the kitchen, quarters for the cook, a pantry, and the chapter room. It originally could house 32 members in eight suites that were on the second and third floors. Each suite consisted of a bedroom for four people and two study rooms. Uniquely modern for its time, the chapter house had a central vacuum system and steam heat.

In 1938, Whitehouse and Price, an architectural firm from Spokane, were hired to enlarge the south parlor by removing the walls between it and the smaller game room, chapter office, and reception room. The vacuum system's pipes were used for new electrical wiring in the 1940s. Fraternity alumnus and architect Paul Blanton modified the second and third floor suites in 1958, creating an addition sleeping space with two and three-person rooms. In 1966, a small kitchen addition was built on the north side of the rear entrance. Also, in 1966, the south parlor was redesigned with a Spanish motif, replacing the paneling and beams with swirling plaster.

== See also ==
- North American fraternity and sorority housing
