= Hotel Rietmann =

- U.S. National Register of Historic Places
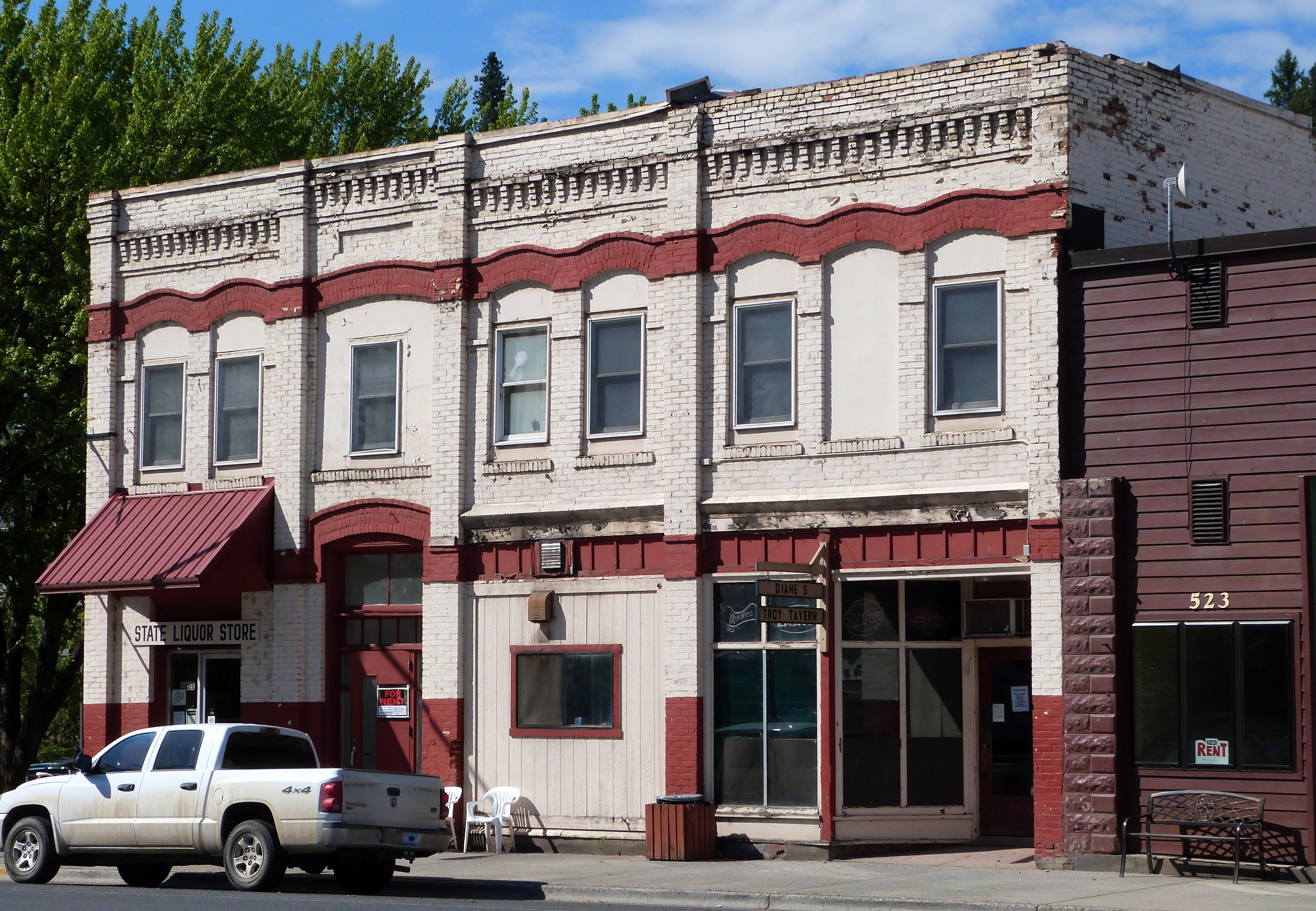
- The building in 2015

- Location within Idaho Location within the United States
- Location: 525 and 529 South Main Street, Troy, Idaho
- Coordinates: 46°44′03″N 116°45′58″W
- Area: less than one acre
- Built: 1898
- Built by: Olaf F. Rudeen
- Architectural style: Commercial, Romanesque Revival
- NRHP reference No.: 01001302
- Added to NRHP: November 29, 2001

Hotel Rietmann is a historic two-story building in Troy, Idaho. It was designed in the Commercial and Romanesque Revival styles with pilasters and a corbeled cornice, and built in 1898 by Olaf F. Rudeen for Charles Rietmann, an immigrant from Switzerland. It was purchased by Charles Tompson and renamed the Inland Hotel in 1911. It belonged to Pearl M. Field from 1937 to 1939, when it was purchased by J. J. Berg, who opened a liquor store on the first floor. When their son Norman acquired it in 1958, he added a restaurant but closed it in 1973; Berg sold the building in 1991. It has been listed on the National Register of Historic Places since November 29, 2001. The building was purchased in 2020 by Darrell and Brandi Chastain. The bar was reopened after a remodel and renamed the Pog Mo Thoin Pub.
