= Moscow City Hall (Idaho) =

- Moscow Post Office and Courthouse
- U.S. National Register of Historic Places
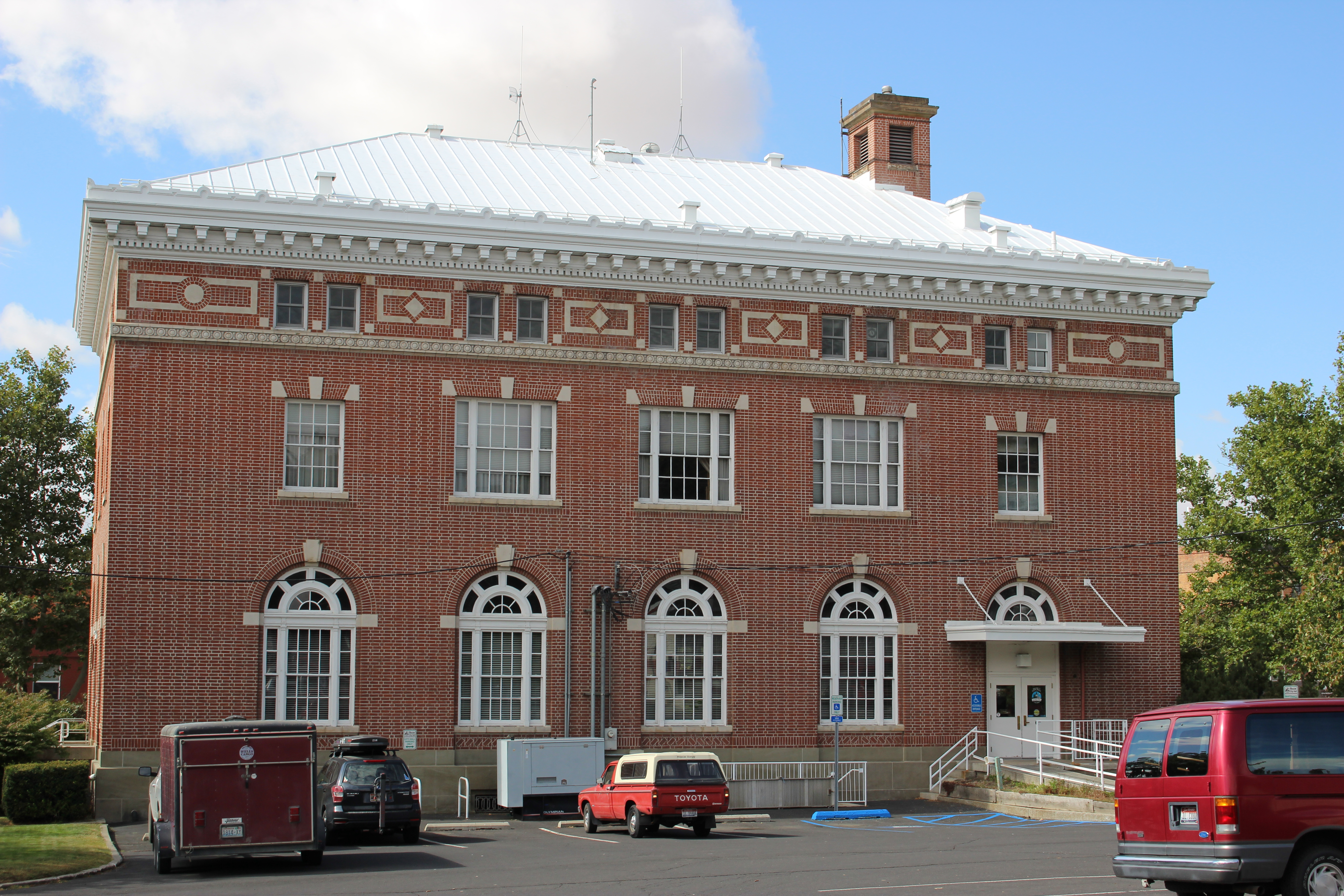
- East side in 2017

- Location within Idaho Location within the United States
- Interactive map showing the location for Moscow City Hall
- Location: 206 E. Third Street; Moscow, Idaho
- Coordinates: 46.7327°N 116.9997°W
- Area: less than one acre
- Built: 1911; 115 years ago
- Architect: U.S. Treasury Dept.
- Architectural style: Late Victorian, Eclectic
- NRHP reference No.: 73000686
- Added to NRHP: July 3, 1973

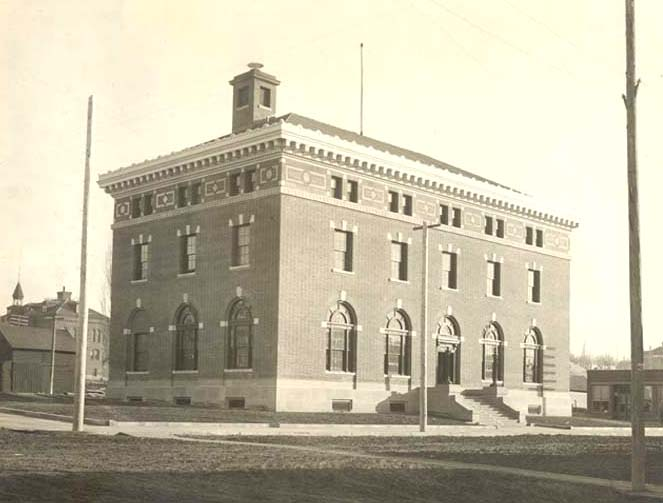
Moscow City Hall, 1917

The City Hall of Moscow, Idaho, formerly known as the Moscow Post Office and Courthouse and Moscow Federal Building, was built 115 years ago in 1911. Its red brick with ivory terracotta trim reflects Late Victorian and Eclectic architecture.

As a federal building, it served historically as a post office and a courthouse of the U.S. District Court for the District of Idaho. Listed on the National Register of Historic Places in 1973, it was vacated in 1974 when the new federal building opened two blocks south. Two years later, it was acquired by the city from the General Services Administration for $70,000, with half of that funded from the state historical society. At the time, the land alone was valued at $100,000.

Rejected for use as a library in 1979, it became a community center in the early 1980s.

A bond issue to fund a renovation was defeated in late 1986. It became the city hall of the municipality in the 1990s, and is now known as Moscow City Hall.

== See also ==
- National Register of Historic Places listings in Latah County, Idaho
- List of United States post offices
