= Sigma Alpha Epsilon Fraternity House (Moscow, Idaho) =

- U.S. National Register of Historic Places
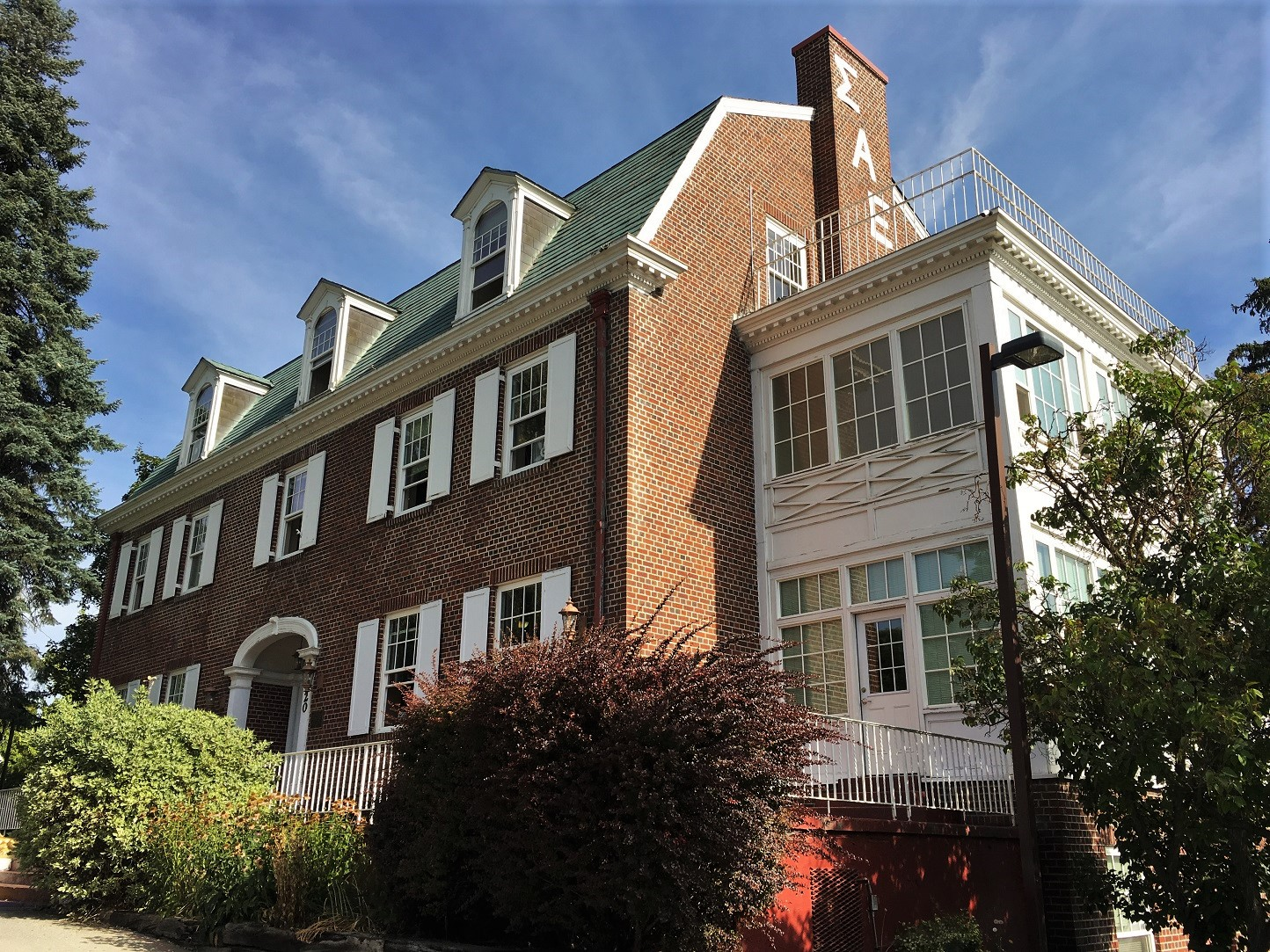
- The house in 2017

- Location within Idaho Location within the United States
- Location: 920 Deakin Street, Moscow, Idaho
- Coordinates: 46°43′34″N 117°00′20″W
- Area: less than one acre
- Built: 1932
- Architect: Charles I. Carpenter
- Architectural style: Colonial Revival
- NRHP reference No.: 93001335
- Added to NRHP: December 2, 1993

The Sigma Alpha Epsilon Fraternity House is a historic fraternity house in Moscow, Idaho. It was built in 1932 for the Idaho Alpha chapter of Sigma Alpha Epsilon at the University of Idaho. The house was designed by architect Charles I. Carpenter in the Colonial Revival style. It has been listed on the National Register of Historic Places since December 31, 1993.

The first chapter house of the Idaho Alpha chapter of Sigma Alpha Epsilon was at 904 Deakin, the intersection of Deakin Street and College Avenue, close to the student union building. ZXA, a newly established local fraternity, rented the boarding house in 1916 after the Gamma Phi Beta sorority moved into its newly built chapter house across from the Administration Building Lawn where the music building is now. ZXA successfully petitioned the national Sigma Alpha Epsilon fraternity for a charter in 1919. The first SAE chapter house capacity of approximately 20 men was expanded in a 1923 remodel but toward the end of the 1920s the SAE chapter had again outgrown the building.

The goal of the local ZXA fraternity and then the SAE chapter was to be the dominant fraternity at the University of Idaho. Searching for a location that would support this goal, the house corporation found a corner lot several blocks away at the intersection of Deakin Street and Sweet Avenue that was occupied by a two-story house and a small barn. Although the lot was at the edge of campus it was considered a perfect location to build an imposing chapter house. Across Sweet Avenue was the newly planted arboretum and there were empty fields behind the property available for football and baseball games. Although Sweet Avenue was a muddy rutted dirt road, it connected to the slowly improving North South Highway that connected Moscow with Lewiston and southern Idaho. The new SAE chapter house was designed by Spokane architect Charles I. Carpenter who also was the architect for a number of public buildings during his career that included court houses, city halls and lodge buildings in Spokane and Moscow. Carpenter chose the Colonial Revival building style for the SAE chapter house to maximize interior living space for the construction dollar.

The SAE chapter house is set diagonally on its large corner lot, facing the intersection of Deakin and Sweet streets. Because the lot drops considerably from front to rear, the full height of the basement is exposed at the rear and sides of the building but not on the facade. An asphalt driveway provides access for delivery vans and student parking at the rear. A narrower semicircular cement drive installed in the 1950s crosses the lot in front of the house. Today mature landscaping in the front includes shrubs, large spruce and birch trees. The front lawn is crossed by a concrete walkway leading from the intersection to the front door.

The large chapter house was rapidly built in 4 1/2 months partly due to the ample inexpensive labor available in the Great Depression. Architectural plans were completed in early 1932, and construction began in the spring. Contractors completed the excavation and poured footings by late May, laid the brick walls during the next two months and finished the roof before the end of July. Workmen kept on schedule allowing fraternity members to move into their new quarters before the start of the new school year in September 1932.

The 150,000 bricks used to build the SAE chapter house were produced by the Moscow Fire Brick & Clay Products in kilns located on Sweet Avenue close to the North South Highway. This Moscow company also manufactured the bricks used in many of the downtown Moscow and University of Idaho buildings built in the 1920s to 1950s.

Newspaper articles reported that the fraternity's new chapter house costing $52,145 in 1932 dollars (about $990,000 in 2020 dollars) was the most expensive in the Pacific Northwest. The 1931 lot purchase and construction the next year was financed by alumni donations, cashed in life insurance policies, undergraduate SAE's gold panning profits, sale of the 904 chapter house and the purchase of a $10,000 bond with a 2 1/2 percent interest rate by Charles Bocock (Illinois Beta 1899) a SAE alumni brother who was the president of the Albion State Normal School in Albion, Idaho.

The new four story SAE chapter house designed for 45 men was a marvel of its day. Interior space was divided by function: food, recreation, service, storage in the basement; primarily social areas on the first floor; study and sleeping areas on the second and third floors. Four load bearing brick walls support the roof and the upper two floors are supported inside the walls by an independently standing steel frame box that was designed to facilitate future remodeling. Advanced 1932 amenities included two man study rooms with built in study desks, an electric kitchen range and an electric refrigerator. There was an electric fan to cool the kitchen and dining room on hot days.

The fully exposed basement contained the boiler and nearby coal storage room, kitchen, dining room, cook's apartment and house manager's room. The basement's most private space was reserved for the chapter room. During the 1960s and later there were three basement study rooms: Room 69 (previously the cook's apartment) the Hole (the house manager's room off of the dining room) and the Mole (a small two man room off of the chapter room).

From the front the second story of the chapter house is at ground level. The front facade features a symmetrical design whose primary focus is the recessed formal center entry. Two large social rooms, the informal room on the right and the formal room on the left, flank the entry hall and a center stairwell lines up with the large front door. In 1932 the "Boar's Nest" (now called the library) was accessed through the "Stag Room" (now called the informal room) and the "Radio Room" (now called the president's room) was accessed through the formal room. The "Radio Room" was where SAEs played ping pong and listened to music and football games on the chapter radio. For years a radio antenna was strung between the two brick chimneys to pick up radio signals. The formal room, informal room and library have brick fireplaces. At the rear of the first floor directly above the basement cook's apartment was the house mother's room which had a full bathroom and a fold down wall bed. During the 1930s and 1940s the house mother lived in the chapter house. Beginning in the 1950s the house mother's room was a facility for overnight guests such as SAE parents and served as a bathroom for dates during dances held in the chapter house.

The second and third floor bathroom and shower facilities were directly above the first floor house mother's room. The two upper floors held 14 study rooms which kept their original 1932 room numbers until the 2008 rebuilding project changed the floor layouts. Articles in the 1932 Sigma Alpha Epsilon Record magazine reported that there were five sleeping dormitories in the house: two on the second floor (pledge and sophomore sleeping porches) and three more on the third floor (two large and one small dormitories). Due to lessons learned in the 1917/1918 influenza epidemic the small dormitory was reserved as an infirmary. The University of Idaho student newspaper reported in 1932 that SAEs slept in new "double bunk beds with luxurious spring mattresses". Electric blankets to keep fraternity members warm during winter nights were not introduced to the open sleeping porches until the 1957/1958 school year.

Originally the long narrow space beneath the front entry was intended to be a bowling alley. The space soon began to be used to sight in hunting rifles for deer season and the name was changed to the "Shooting Gallery" to reflect this use. The two lions (aka "Phi" and "Alpha") on both sides of the front entry steps were donated in 1961 by Bill Currie (Idaho Alpha 1959). The lions were acquired from a vacated bank building in the San Francisco - Oakland area. The 1947 pledge class obtained the house bell from a closed school in the Moscow area. It was cast in 1892 in Michigan and a study room window leading out to the sophomore sleeping porch roof needed to be removed to move the bell onto the deck. The bell was cracked when it was rung all day in celebration of the 1954 football victory over Washington State.

At the beginning of the 1932 fall semester 41 SAEs moved into the new chapter house designed for 45 men. During the 1950s chapter house capacity was expanded to 62 men by adding three and four level bunk beds on the sleeping porches converting two third floor dormitories to study rooms and increasing the number of men in most study rooms. Minor building remodels were completed in 1968, 1978 and 1993 to refresh and update the building.

A structural engineering inspection in 2002 found that the basement dining room floor, the bathrooms and others areas of the 73-year-old building had deteriorated significantly. A successful alumni fundraising campaign led by Rich Allen (Idaho Alpha 1972) enabled reconstruction to begin early 2008. Greg Toolson (Idaho Alpha 1982) served as architect. The house corporation led by Bill McCann (Idaho Alpha 1966) and Gary Garnand (Idaho Alpha 1970) oversaw the 10 month $2.5 million construction project. Lori McCann (wife of Bill McCann and Order of Violets recipient) led the interior design effort. The reconstruction kept most of the basement and all of the first floor layout true to the 1932 architectural plans. Interior walls were taken down to the brick outside walls and then rebuilt. All heating, electrical and plumbing systems were replaced. The building was updated to current fire and access building code requirements. Interior chapter house area was increased to 13,638 square feet with capacity for 63 men. During 2013 three of the first floor study rooms were combined to create a house director apartment which reduced house capacity to 58 men plus the house director.

The Sigma Alpha Epsilon chapter house on almost an acre of land was placed on the National Register of Historic Places in 1993 in recognition of its architectural significance. On a local level it is a good example of Colonial Revival architecture which was one of the two dominant styles applied to Greek chapter houses during the 1920s and 1930s. The 1993 National Register citation states that "after more than sixty year of continuous use as a fraternity residence the SAE house retains its integrity of location, design, setting, materials, workmanship, feeling and association since construction in 1932".

Between 1932 and 2019 the 87 year old chapter house was a center of University of Idaho college memories for over 2,100 college men and women (1,700+ SAEs, 350+ Little Sisters of Minerva and 72 Violet Queens). The saplings planted in 1932 have grown into large mature trees just like the thousands of life long friendships that began at 920 Deakin in Moscow, Idaho. The SAE chapter house designed by Charles I. Carpenter has achieved its goal of creating a fraternity "feeling and association" that promoted strong fraternal bonds through communal dining and sleeping facilities. Idaho Alpha of Sigma Alpha Epsilon was recognized by the Interfraternity Council (IFC) and returned to the University of Idaho in 2022.

== See also ==
- North American fraternity and sorority housing
