= W. J. McConnell House =

- McConnell Mansion Historic House Museum
- U.S. National Register of Historic Places
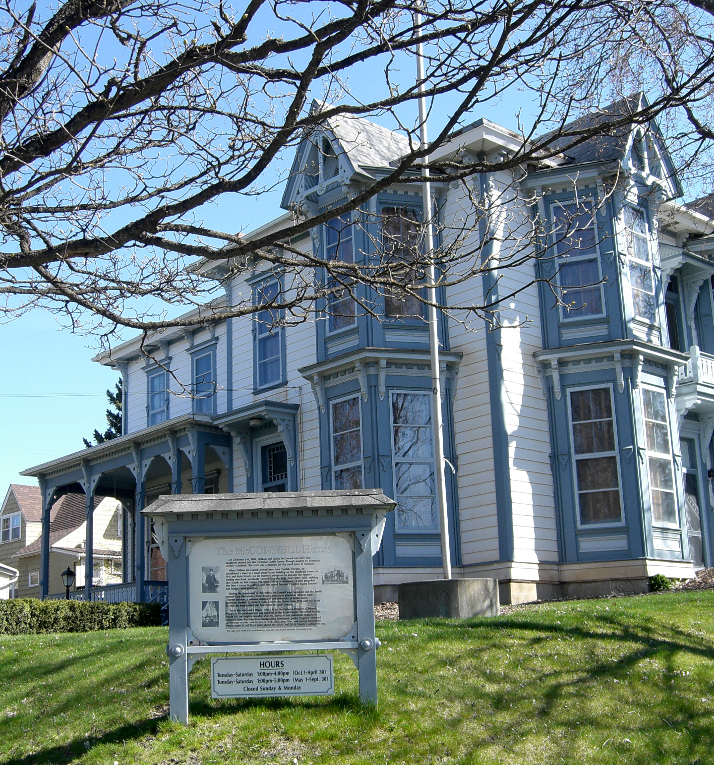
- The house in 2007

- Location within Idaho Location within the United States
- Location: 110 South Adams Street, Moscow, Idaho
- Coordinates: 46°43′59″N 116°59′45″W
- Area: less than one acre
- Built: 1886
- Architectural style: Stick/eastlake
- NRHP reference No.: 74000743
- Added to NRHP: November 21, 1974

The McConnell Mansion Historic House Museum is a historic house in Moscow, Idaho. It was built in 1886 for William J. McConnell, who served as the third governor of Idaho from 1893 to 1897. McConnell and his family, including Mary "Mamie" McConnell Borah, lived in the house until 1897. It was sold out of the McConnell family in 1901 to the Adair Family.

William Adair, his wife Losina, and their daughters Lula, Ione "Pinky," Bernadine, and Margorie all lived in the house until the girls left the nest. Once their daughters were grown, the Adairs rented the rooms to boarders. One such boarder was Dr. Frederic Cross Church, who moved into the house in 1920. In 1935 the Adairs sold the house to the Jackson family. The Jacksons continued to rent rooms to boarders as the Adairs did. The Jacksons only lived in the house a short time before selling the property to Dr. Church in 1940. Dr. Church was a professor at the University of Idaho and liked to rent available rooms at the house to students. He was the last private owner of the McConnell Mansion and bequeathed the house to Latah County upon his death in 1966.

Since 1968, the Latah County Historical Society has managed the McConnell Mansion on behalf of Latah County. The house opened as a museum in 1970.

The building was designed in the Stick/Eastlake architectural style. It has been listed on the National Register of Historic Places since November 21, 1974.
