= Hotel Moscow (Moscow, Idaho) =

- U.S. National Register of Historic Places
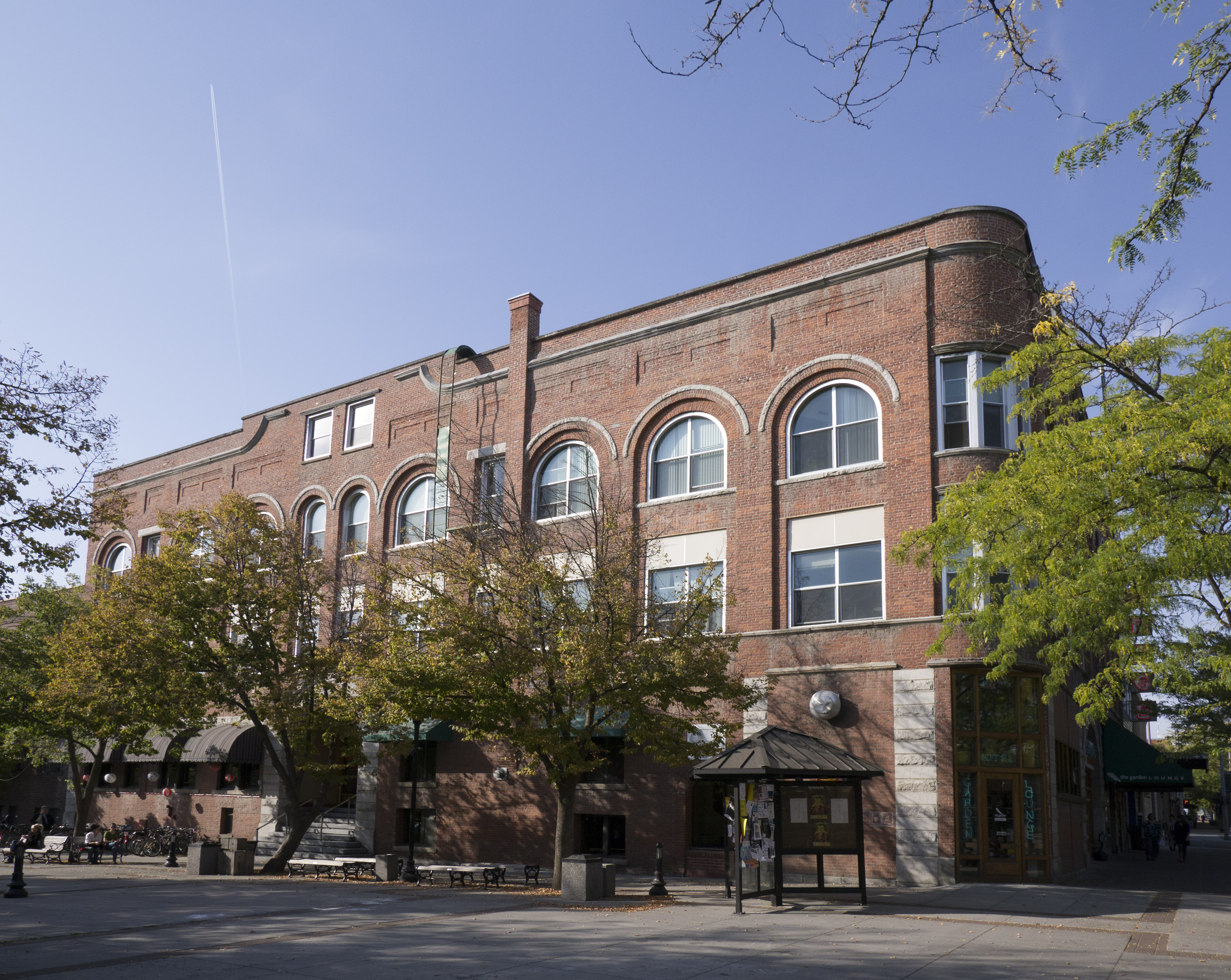
- Hotel Moscow in 2012

- Location within Idaho Location within the United States
- Location: 4th and Main Streets, Moscow, Idaho
- Coordinates: 46°43′55″N 117°00′03″W
- Area: less than one acre
- Built: 1891
- Built by: Taylor & Lauder
- Architect: M.J. Shields, M.J. & Co.
- Architectural style: Romanesque Revival
- NRHP reference No.: 78001074
- Added to NRHP: November 30, 1978

Hotel Moscow is a historic three-story building in Moscow, Idaho, United States. It was built as a hotel by R. H. Barton. Construction began in 1891 on the site of a former hotel (built in 1880 and burned down in 1890), and it was completed in 1892. It was designed in the Romanesque Revival architectural style. It has been listed on the National Register of Historic Places since November 30, 1978.
