= Mason Cornwall House =

Historic house in Idaho, United States

- U.S. National Register of Historic Places
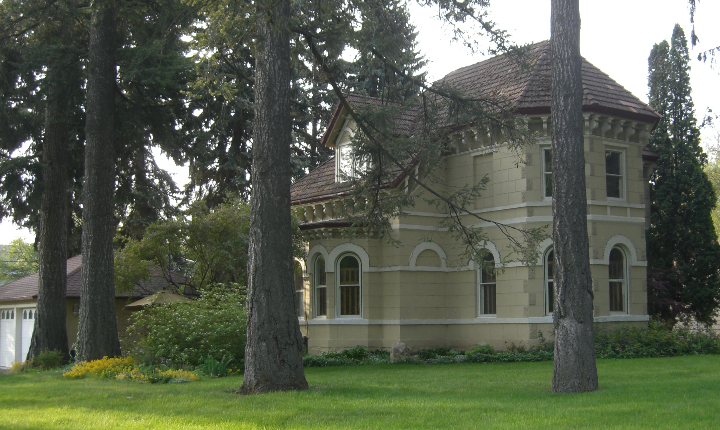
- 2007

- Location within Idaho Location within the United States
- Interactive map showing the location of Mason Cornwall House
- Location: 308 S. Hayes St. Moscow (Latah CO) Idaho
- Coordinates: 46°43′56″N 116°59′17″W
- Built: 1889
- Architect: Lauder and Taylor for Mason Cornwall
- Architectural style: Victorian Italianate
- NRHP reference No.: 77000465
- Added to NRHP: December 12, 1977

The Mason Cornwall House is located in Northern Idaho at 308 South Hayes Street in Moscow, Idaho. The residence is a Victorian Italianate style house constructed of brick with a stucco finish. It is architecturally significant as one of the finest houses of its period in this area. The Cornwall house is listed on the National Register of Historic Places. It is currently used as a private dwelling.

== Construction details ==
The stucco was applied to the brick in a technique that simulates cut stone. The house was built in 1889 by Lauder and Taylor, builders in the Moscow area. The builder used Troy brick from a brick company in Troy, Idaho to construct the 16-inch (410 mm) thick exterior walls on the first floor and 12-inch (300 mm) walls on the second floor. This house has other Italianate features including a hipped roof and first story round arch windows which are bordered by a band of molding all the way around the house. There are rusticated quoins located underneath the roof cornice. The 2-foot-high (0.61 m) metal brackets under the eaves are handmade. The original roof was covered with interlocking metal shingles and had a small square structure with windows atop it. The shingles have since been replaced with red tile.

== See also ==
- National Register of Historic Places listings in Latah County, Idaho

== Notes ==
- National Park Service
