= Ole Bohman House =

- U.S. National Register of Historic Places
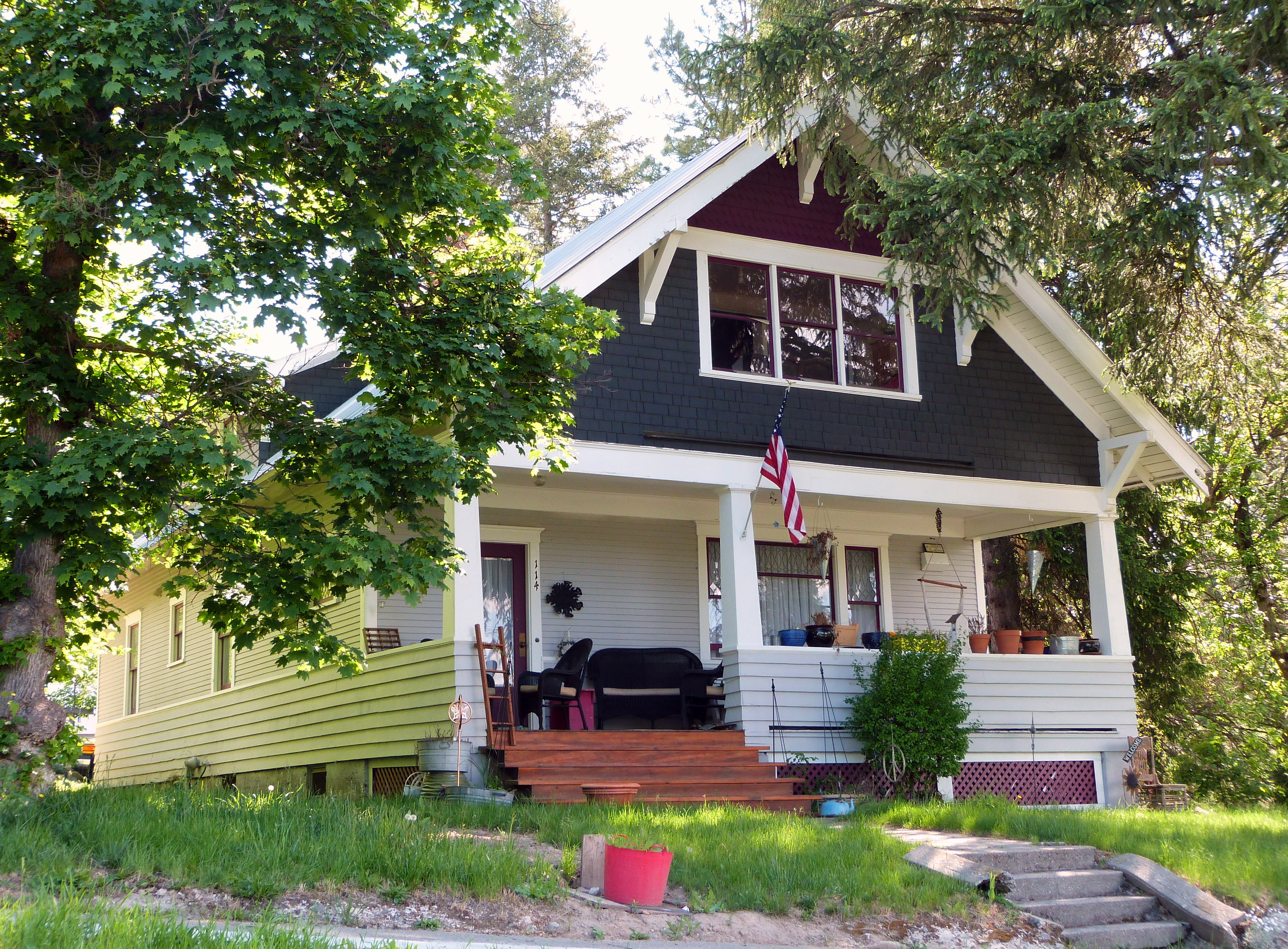

- Location within Idaho
- Location: 114 N. Main St., Troy, Idaho
- Coordinates: 46°44′19″N 116°46′16″W
- Area: 0.7 acres (0.28 ha)
- Built: 1913
- Architectural style: Bungalow/craftsman
- NRHP reference No.: 13000293
- Added to NRHP: May 22, 2013

The Ole Bohman House, at 114 N. Main St. in Troy, Idaho, was built in 1913. It was listed on the National Register of Historic Places in 2013.

According to its National Register nomination, the Ole Bohman House is significant for its association "with the productive life and accomplishments of Ole Bohman, an early settler and prominent businessman and banker in the community of Troy, Idaho. The Ole Bohman House also provides an excellent example of Bungalow/Craftsman style in Troy."

About Ole Bohman: he "was a significant settler and businessman in Troy, Idaho. His work in developing a local lumber business and a local bank aided the growth of Troy and the surrounding region. Ole Bohman was born Ole Olson on June 22, 1874, in the Varmland area of Sweden. His family was prosperous, but he sought even more opportunity in the United States. In 1893, at the age of 18, he immigrated to Minnesota, and a few years later he moved to the area that would become Troy, where several friends from Sweden had settled. He was the first from his immediate family to immigrate; but within a few years, his brothers Axel and John joined him in the growing community. Ole Olson (sometimes spelled as Olsson) decided to change his surname out of frustration with mail deliveries and other complications resulting from so many Olsons living in the area. According to a friend, he identified three potential names and asked his father to choose one; his father chose Bohman. The three brothers became Ole, John, and Axel Bohman."

Ole Bohman lived in the house until 1936.

== See also ==
- Axel Bohman House, adjacent and also National Register-listed
