= Moscow High School (1912) =

- U.S. National Register of Historic Places
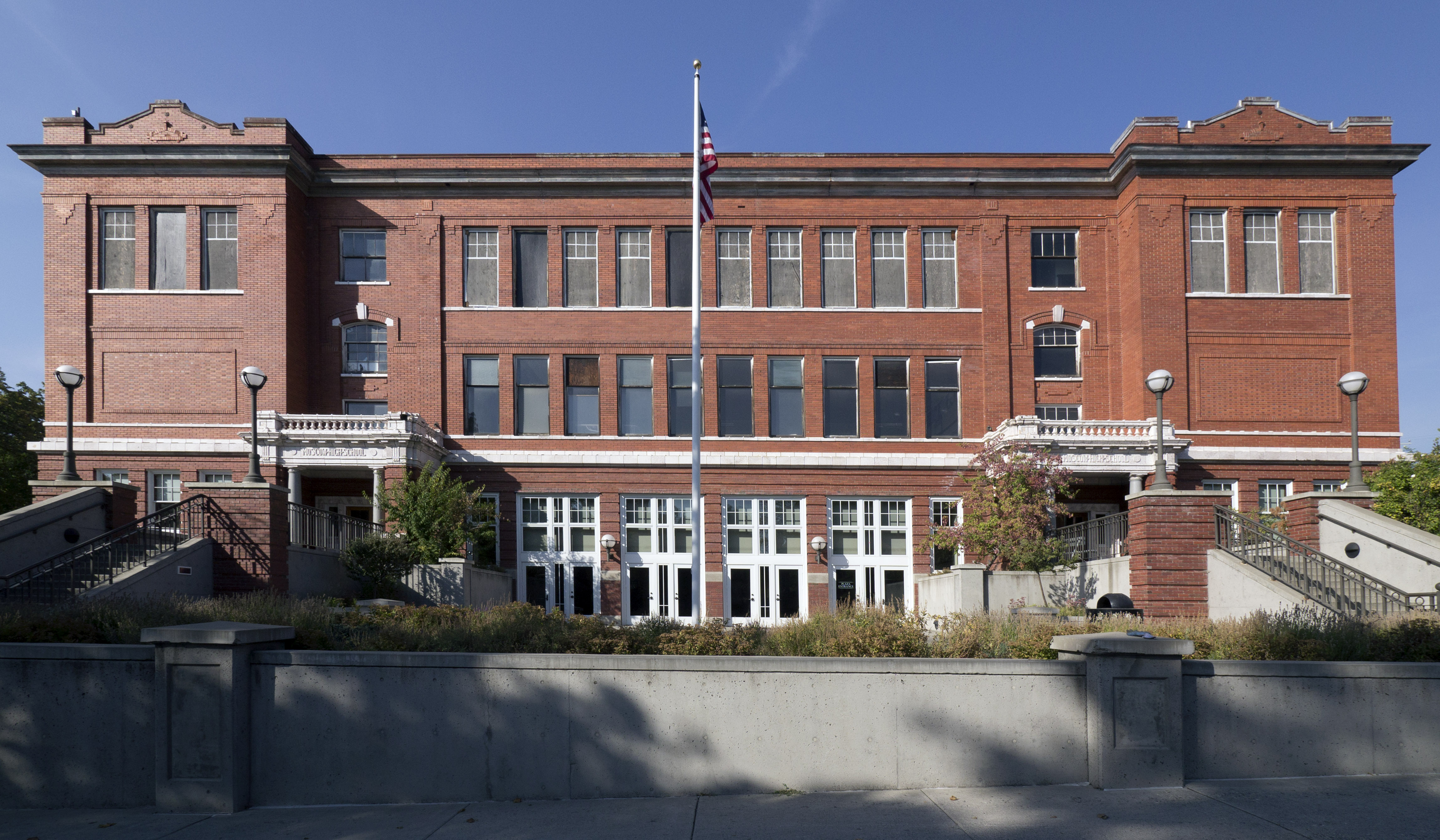

- Location within Idaho Location within the United States
- Location: 412 E 3rd St, Moscow, Idaho
- Coordinates: 46°43′58″N 116°59′47″W
- Area: 1 acre (0.40 ha)
- Built: 1912
- Built by: H.J. Skinner
- Architect: Clarence H. Hubbel
- Architectural style: Classical Revival
- MPS: Public School Buildings in Idaho MPS
- NRHP reference No.: 92000416
- Added to NRHP: May 5, 1992

The Moscow High School, at 412 E 3rd St in Moscow, Idaho, was built in 1912. The cornerstone was laid on July 6, 1912, and the building was finished in January 1913. It was listed on the National Register of Historic Places in 1992. It has also been known as the 1912 Whitworth School Building and as Moscow Junior High School. It is now the 1912 Center.

It was designed in the Classical revival architectural style by Clarence H. Hubbel and built by H.J. Skinner.

It served as a high school until 1939, then as a junior high until 1959. Classrooms served to annex the current High School through the early 1970s. School District #281 offices also occupied parts of the building as early as 1957 until the sale of the building to the City of Moscow in 1997. Phase I of the 1912 Center renovation opened the Great Room (the old gym), Plaza and kitchen to the community on October 27, 2001. Phase II opened the Senior Center and Friendship Hall on June 1, 2002. Heart of the Arts, Inc. (HAI), an arts non-profit founded in 2002, took over the operation of the 1912 Center from the City in May 2007. The first project done by HAI was the West Wing renovation which opened the Fiske Room and the Arts Workshop in October 2008. Exterior renovations to replace the windows and increase onsite parking took place from 2009 to 2016. The second floor renovation project added the Lecompte Auditorium and the Reception Gallery to the building in October 2020, the Community Living Room and the Chin Lew Green Dragon Game Room in September 2021 and the Book Room and the Barr Family Historic Classroom in September 2022.
