= Axel Bohman House =

- U.S. National Register of Historic Places
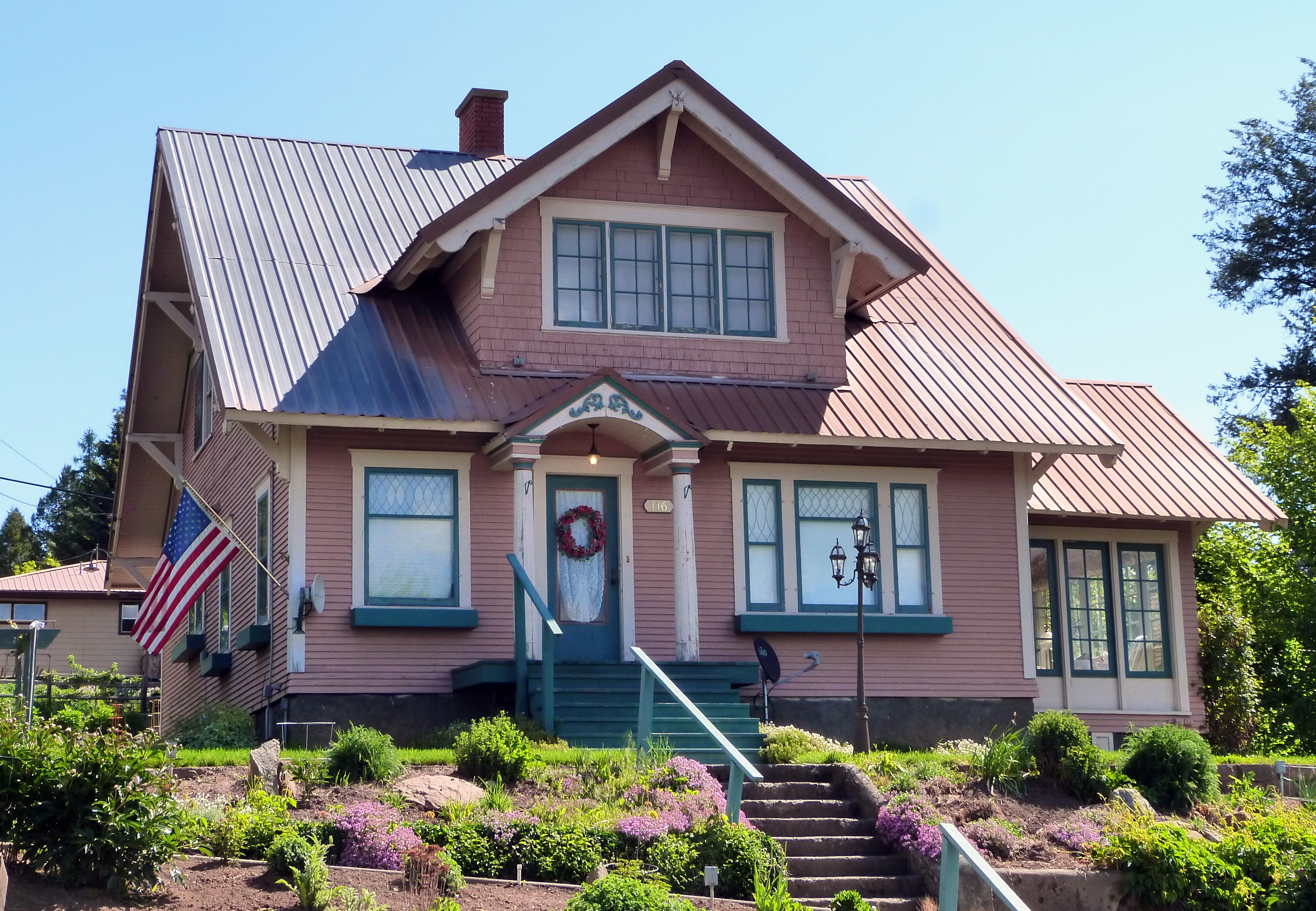

- Location within Idaho Location within the United States
- Location: 116 N. Main St., Troy, Idaho
- Coordinates: 46°44′19″N 116°46′17″W
- Area: less than one acre
- Built: 1914
- Architect: Bohman, Axel; et al.
- Architectural style: Bungalow/craftsman
- NRHP reference No.: 11000523
- Added to NRHP: August 10, 2011

The Axel Bohman House, at 116 N. Main St. in Troy, Idaho, was built in 1914. It was the home of one of three brothers who immigrated from Sweden.

It was listed on the National Register of Historic Places in 2011.

== See also ==
- Ole Bohman House, adjacent and also National Register-listed
