= McConnell–McGuire Building =

- McConnell-McGuire Building
- U.S. National Register of Historic Places
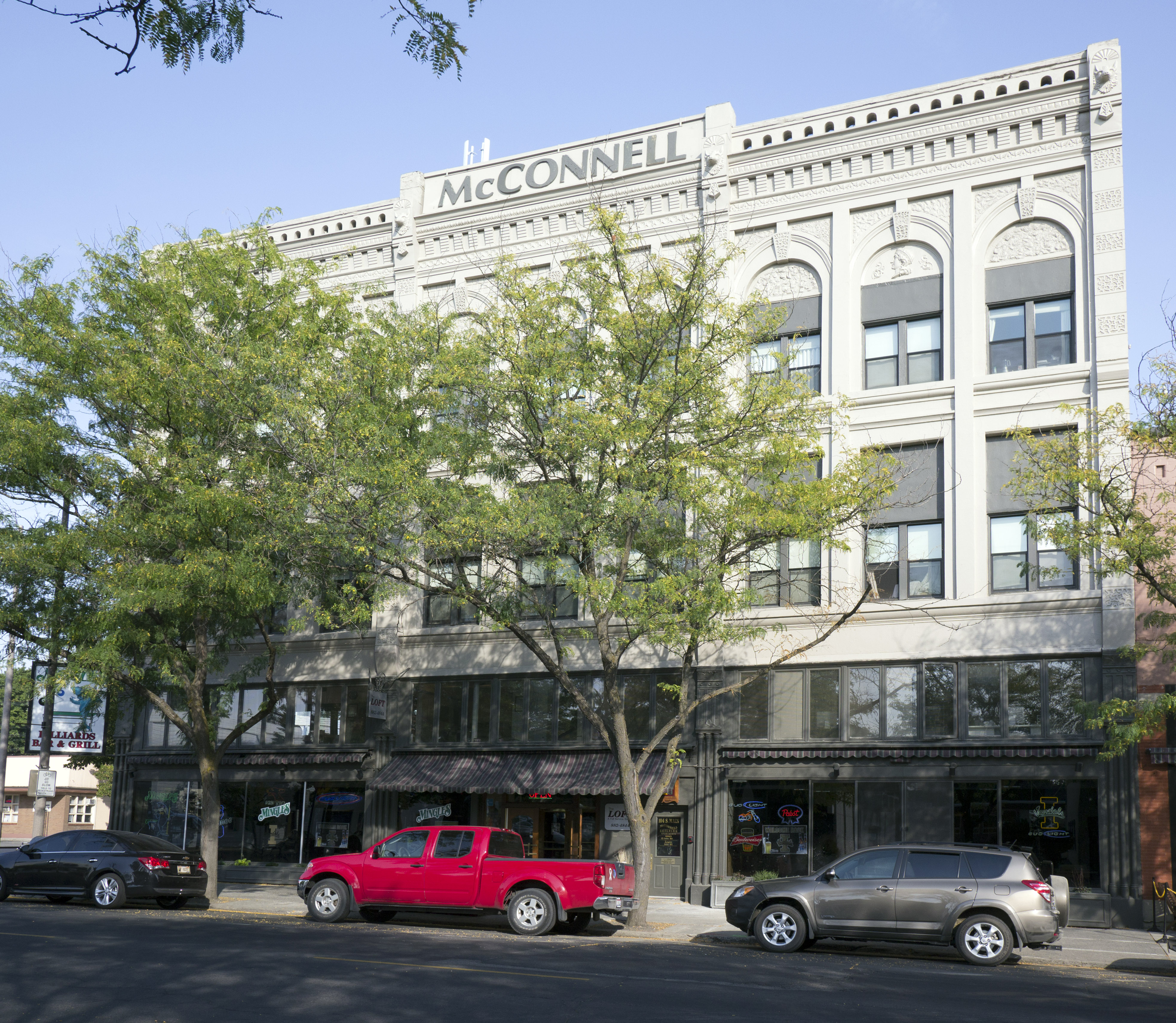
- The building in 2012

- Location within Idaho Location within the United States
- Location: Main and 1st Streets, Moscow, Idaho
- Coordinates: 46°44′01″N 117°00′01″W
- Area: less than one acre
- Built: 1891
- Architect: W. J. Lewis; M. D. Ogilbee
- NRHP reference No.: 78001076
- Added to NRHP: February 7, 1978

The McConnell–McGuire Building is a historic building in Moscow, Idaho. It was built in 1891, for the McConnell-McGuire department store. One of its founders, William J. McConnell, served as the third governor of Idaho from 1893 to 1897.

The building was designed by architects W. J. Lewis and M. D. Ogilbee. It has been listed on the National Register of Historic Places since February 7, 1978.
