= Moscow Carnegie Library =

- U.S. National Register of Historic Places
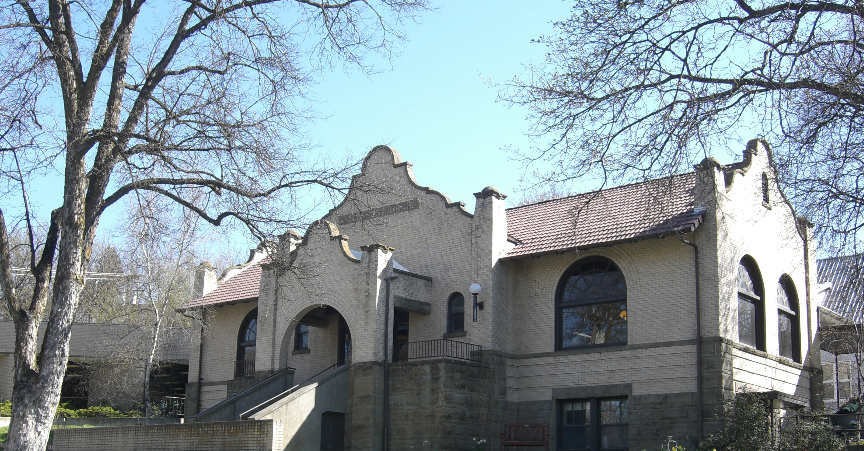
- The library in 2007

- Location within Idaho
- Location: 110 South Jefferson Street, Moscow, Idaho
- Coordinates: 46°44′00″N 116°59′51″W
- Area: less than one acre
- Built: 1905
- Architect: Watson Vernon
- Architectural style: Mission/Spanish revival
- NRHP reference No.: 79000800
- Added to NRHP: June 18, 1979

The Moscow Carnegie Library is a historic building in Moscow, Idaho. It was built as a Carnegie library in 1905, and the front steps were built in the 1930s. It was designed by architect Watson Vernon in the Spanish Colonial Revival style. It has been listed on the National Register of Historic Places since June 18, 1979.
