= Ridenbaugh Hall =

- U.S. National Register of Historic Places
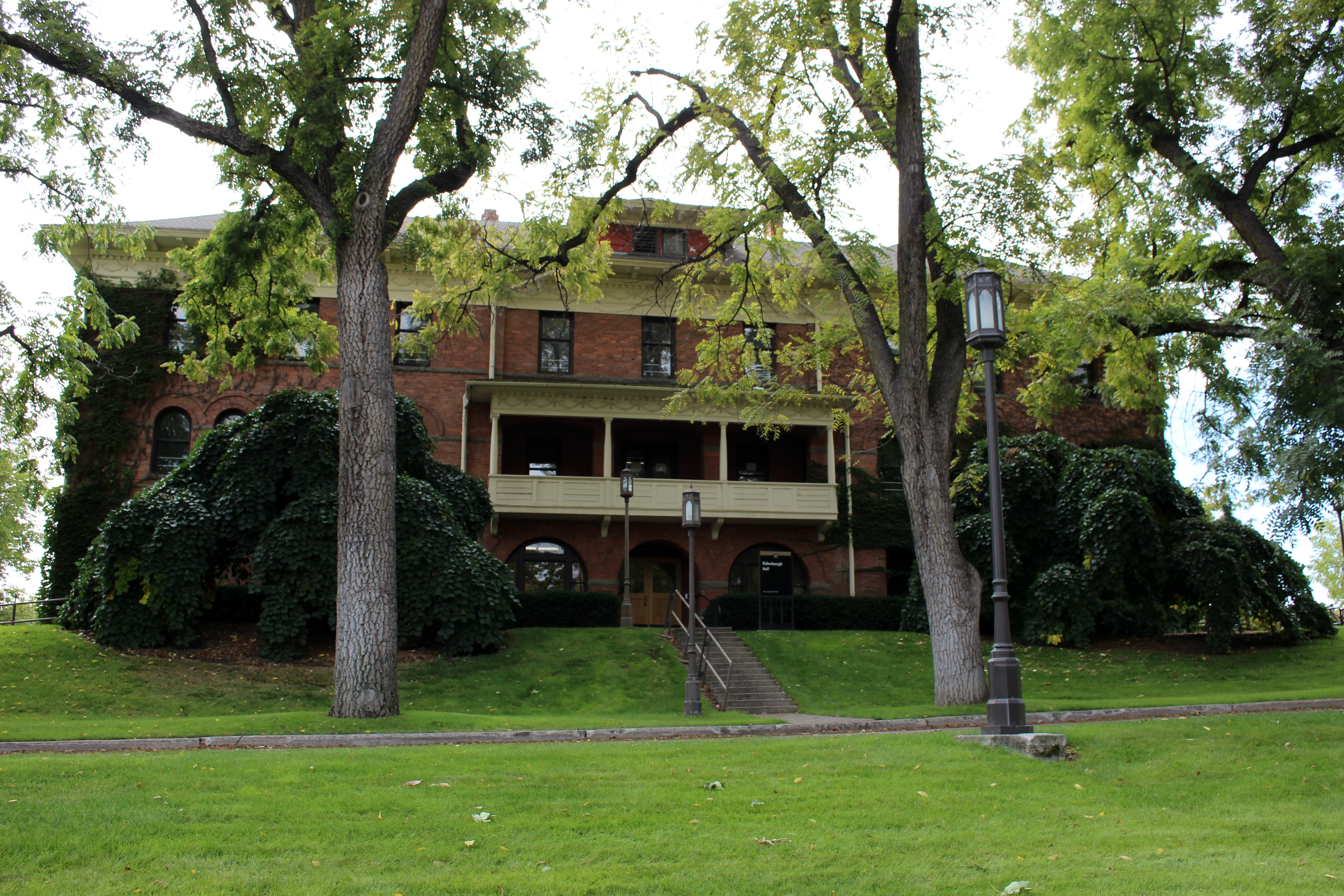
- View from north in 2017

- Location within Idaho Location within the United States
- Location: Campus Drive at Blake Street; University of Idaho; Moscow, Idaho, U.S.
- Coordinates: 46°43′28″N 117°00′32″W
- Area: less than one acre
- Built: 1902; 124 years ago
- Architect: Willis Ritchie
- Architectural style: Renaissance, Italian Renaissance Revival
- NRHP reference No.: 77000467
- Added to NRHP: September 14, 1977; 48 years ago

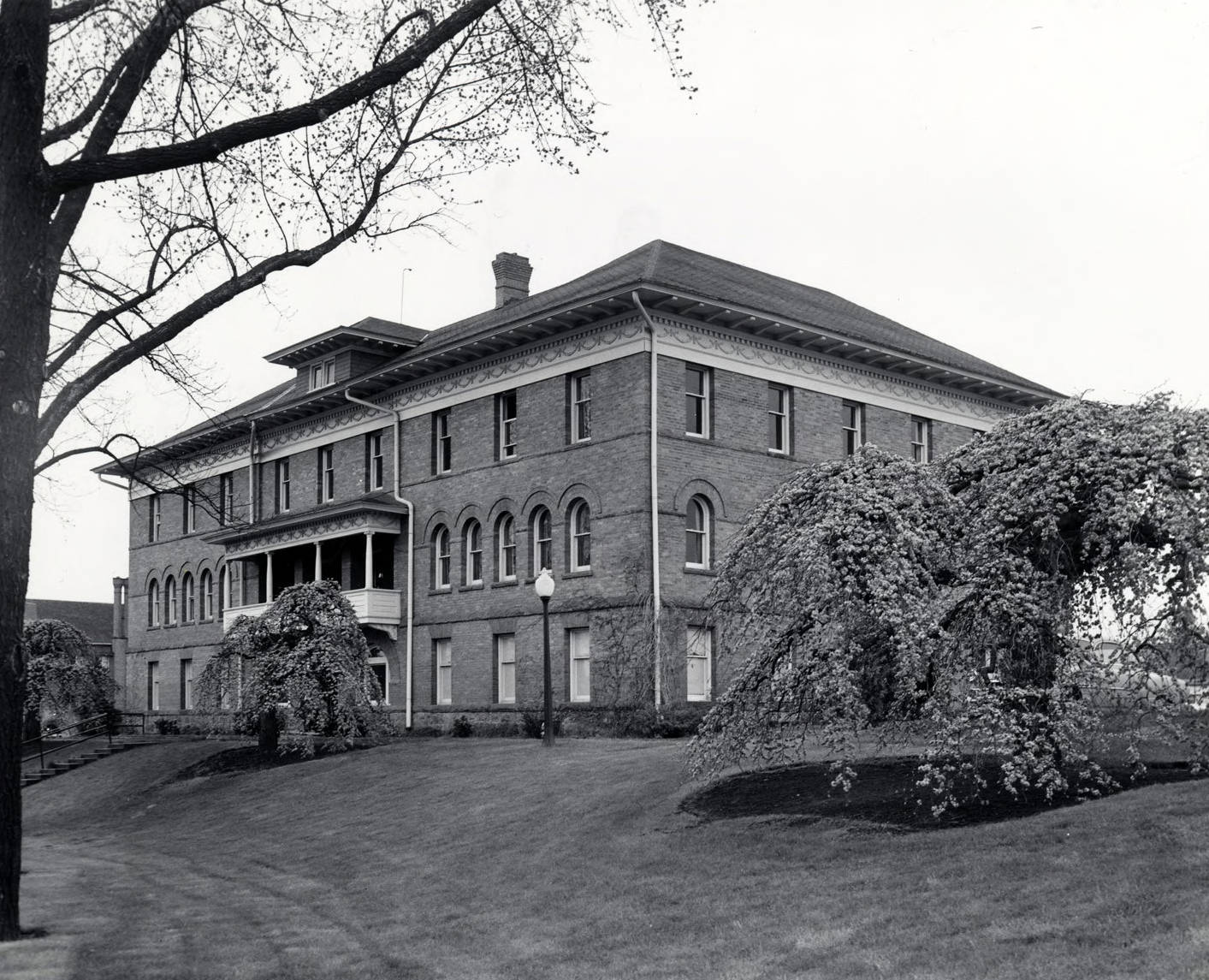
Ridenbaugh Hall in 1980

Ridenbaugh Hall is a historic three-story building in the northwest United States, on the campus of the University of Idaho in Moscow, Idaho. Opened 124 years ago in 1902 as the first UI dormitory for female students, Ridenbaugh has been the oldest brick building on campus since the 1970s.

Designed by architect Willis Ritchie of Spokane in the Renaissance Revival style, the building has been listed on the National Register of Historic Places since September 14, 1977. It was named for Mary E. Ridenbaugh (1857–1926) of Boise, then the vice chairman of the university's board of regents.

On Campus Drive just west of Blake Street, Ridenbaugh Hall faces north and overlooks the four tennis courts on the Administration Lawn; the rear of the building is bounded by the sidewalk of Nez Perce Drive. The approximate elevation at street level is 2,620 feet (800 m) above sea level.
