= Edward and Ida Soncarty Barn =

- U.S. National Register of Historic Places
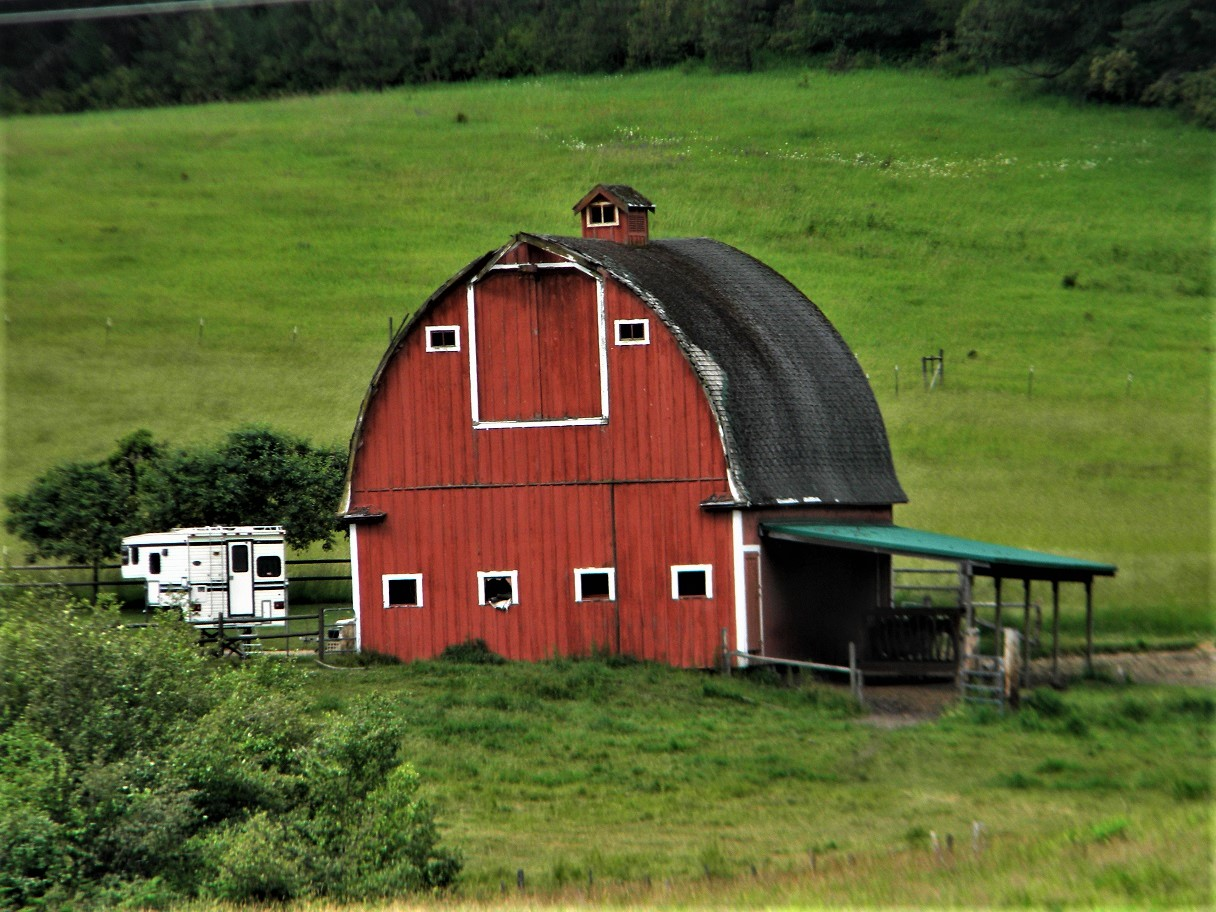

- Location within Idaho Location within the United States
- Location: 1671 Deep Creek Rd. Potlatch, Idaho
- Coordinates: 47°01′44″N 116°53′13″W
- Area: less than one acre
- Built: 1928
- MPS: Agricultural Properties of Latah County, Idaho
- NRHP reference No.: 08000251
- Added to NRHP: April 2, 2008

The Edward and Ida Soncarty Barn, at 1671 Deep Creek Rd. in Potlatch, Idaho, is a Gothic-arch barn built in 1928. It was listed on the National Register of Historic Places in 2008.

It is located about 8 miles (13 km) north of Potlatch, Idaho. It is "highly visible", and about .33 miles (0.53 km) off, from U.S. Highway 95.

It is 30 by 48 feet (9.1 m × 14.6 m) in plan.
