= Kendrick, Idaho =

- City
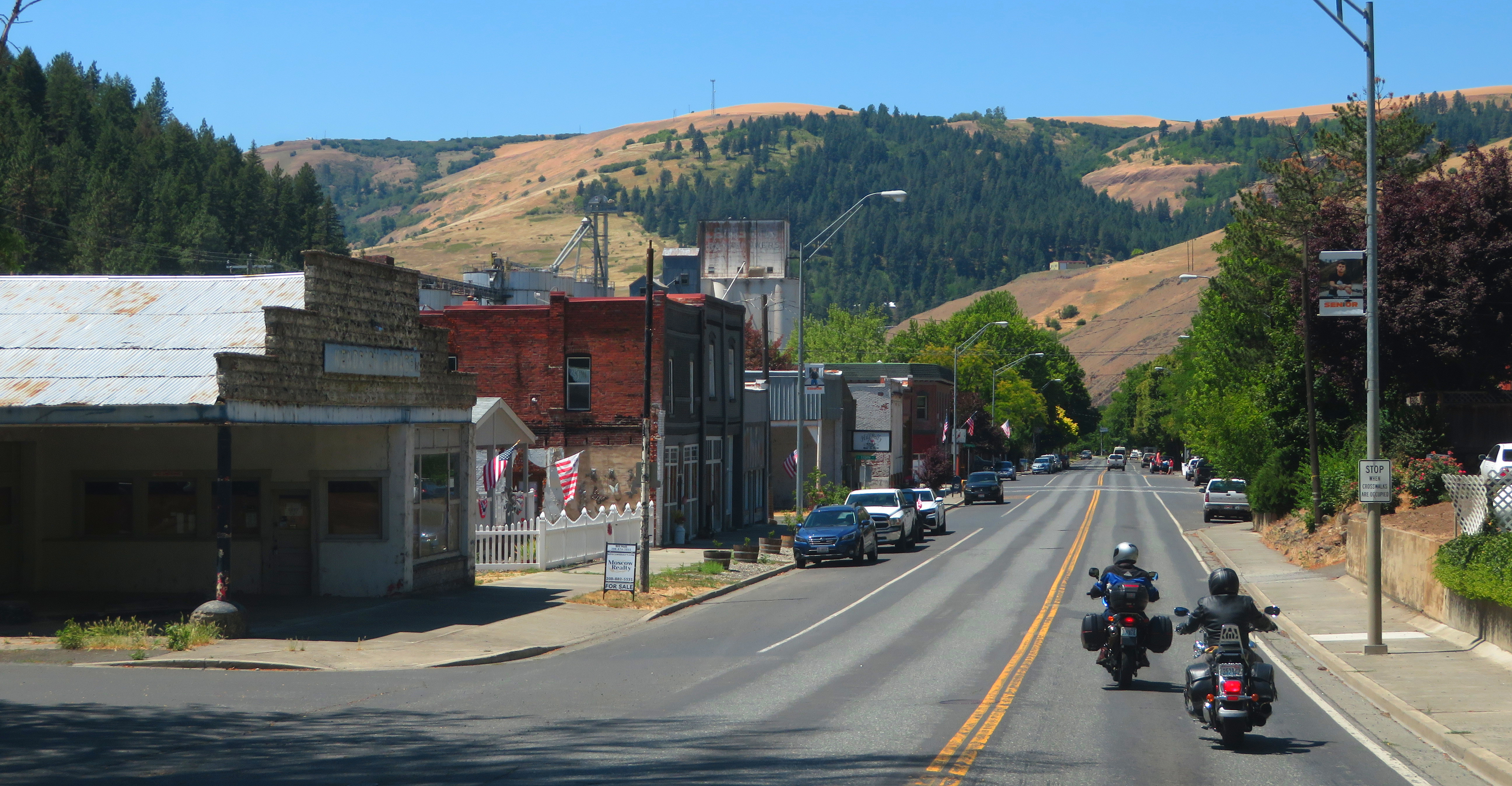
- Downtown Kendrick

- Location of Kendrick in Latah County, Idaho.
- Coordinates: 46°36′50″N 116°39′16″W
- Country: United States
- State: Idaho
- County: Latah

Area
  - Total: 0.38 sq mi (0.98 km^{2})
  - Land: 0.36 sq mi (0.93 km^{2})
  - Water: 0.019 sq mi (0.05 km^{2})
- Elevation: 1,198 ft (365 m)

Population (2020)
  - Total: 288
  - Density: 847.3/sq mi (327.13/km^{2})
- Time zone: UTC-8 (Pacific (PST))
  - Summer (DST): UTC-7 (PDT)
- ZIP code: 83537
- Area code: 208
- FIPS code: 16-42760
- GNIS feature ID: 2410179
- Website: www.cityofkendrick.com

Kendrick is a city in Latah County, Idaho, United States. As of the 2020 census, Kendrick had a population of 288.

== History ==
Founded as Latah or Latah City in 1889 by Thomas Kirby, a post office was established on May 24 with Kirby as the postmaster.

== Geography ==
According to the United States Census Bureau, the city has a total area of 0.40 square miles (1.04 km^{2}), of which, 0.39 square miles (1.01 km^{2}) is land and 0.01 square miles (0.03 km^{2}) is water.

== Demographics ==
Historical population
Census	Pop.	Note	%±
1900	490		—
1910	543		10.8%
1920	522		−3.9%
1930	363		−30.5%
1940	407		12.1%
1950	409		0.5%
1960	443		8.3%
1970	426		−3.8%
1980	395		−7.3%
1990	325		−17.7%
2000	369		13.5%
2010	303		−17.9%
2020	288		−5.0%
U.S. Decennial Census

=== 2010 census ===
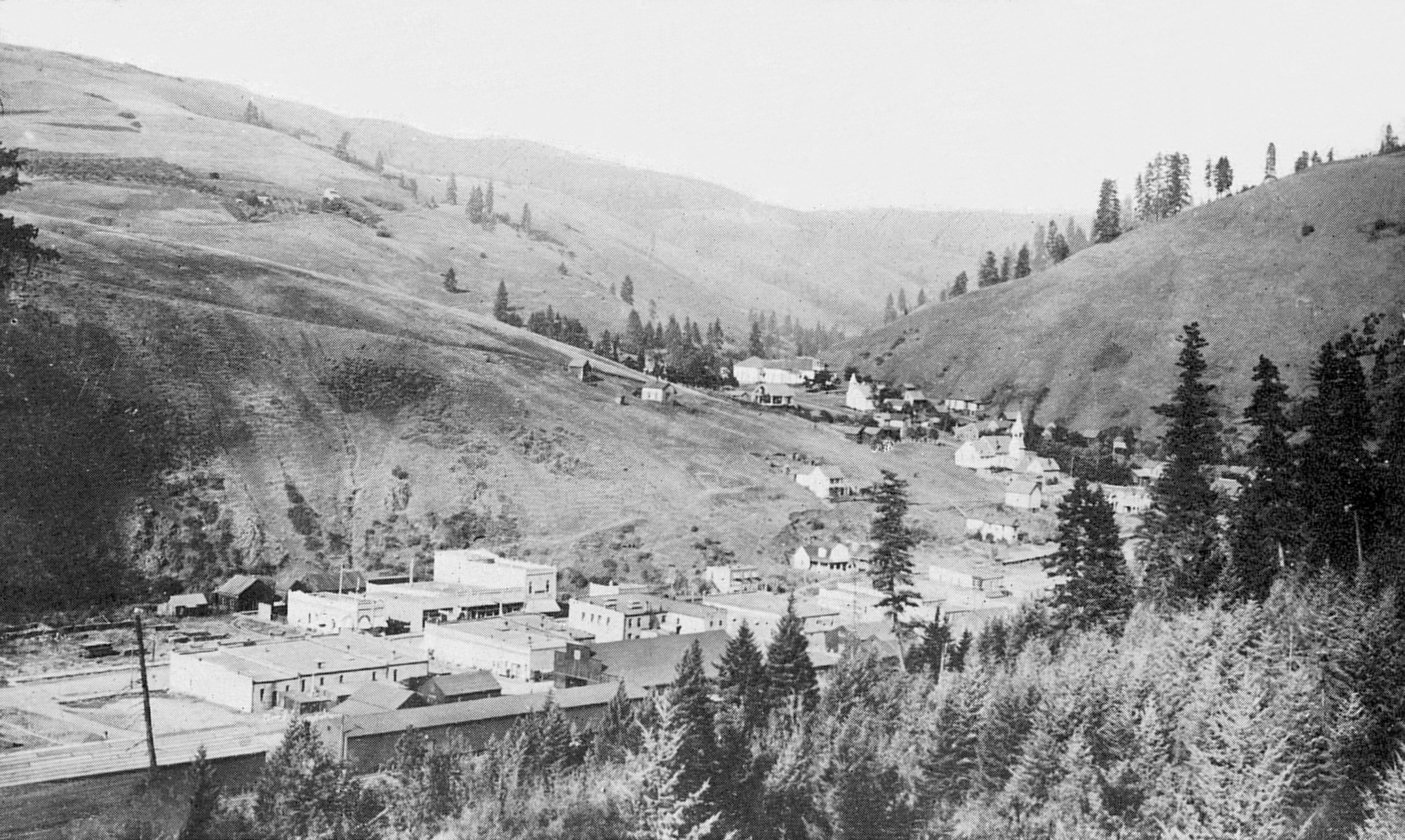
Kendrick, circa 1911

As of the census of 2010, there were 303 people, 144 households, and 88 families living in the city. The population density was 776.9 inhabitants per square mile (300.0/km^{2}). There were 166 housing units at an average density of 425.6 per square mile (164.3/km^{2}). The racial makeup of the city was 97.0% White, 1.0% Native American, and 2.0% from two or more races. Hispanic or Latino of any race were 2.3% of the population.

There were 144 households, of which 23.6% had children under the age of 18 living with them, 47.2% were married couples living together, 9.7% had a female householder with no husband present, 4.2% had a male householder with no wife present, and 38.9% were non-families. 34.7% of all households were made up of individuals, and 22.2% had someone living alone who was 65 years of age or older. The average household size was 2.10 and the average family size was 2.61.

The median age in the city was 50.5 years. 20.1% of residents were under the age of 18; 5.7% were between the ages of 18 and 24; 17% were from 25 to 44; 31.3% were from 45 to 64; and 26.1% were 65 years of age or older. The gender makeup of the city was 50.2% male and 49.8% female.

=== 2000 census ===
As of the census of 2000, there were 369 people, 153 households, and 104 families living in the city. The population density was 918.8 inhabitants per square mile (354.8/km^{2}). There were 165 housing units at an average density of 410.8 per square mile (158.6/km^{2}). The racial makeup of the city was 95.93% White, 0.54% African American, 1.08% Native American, 1.08% from other races, and 1.36% from two or more races. Hispanic or Latino of any race were 2.98% of the population.

There were 153 households, out of which 29.4% had children under the age of 18 living with them, 54.2% were married couples living together, 9.8% had a female householder with no husband present, and 32.0% were non-families. 25.5% of all households were made up of individuals, and 15.0% had someone living alone who was 65 years of age or older. The average household size was 2.41 and the average family size was 2.93.

In the city, the population was spread out, with 26.0% under the age of 18, 5.4% from 18 to 24, 24.9% from 25 to 44, 25.7% from 45 to 64, and 17.9% who were 65 years of age or older. The median age was 42 years. For every 100 females, there were 97.3 males. For every 100 females age 18 and over, there were 99.3 males.

The median income for a household in the city was $31,000, and the median income for a family was $42,000. Males had a median income of $33,611 versus $20,568 for females. The per capita income for the city was $14,706. About 11.2% of families and 11.8% of the population were below the poverty line, including 16.7% of those under age 18 and 7.1% of those age 65 or over.
