= National Register of Historic Places listings in Custer County, Idaho =

Location of Custer County in Idaho

This is a list of the National Register of Historic Places listings in Custer County, Idaho.

This is intended to be a complete list of the properties and districts on the National Register of Historic Places in Custer County, Idaho, United States. Latitude and longitude coordinates are provided for many National Register properties and districts; these locations may be seen together in a map.

There are 38 properties and districts listed on the National Register in the county. More may be added; properties and districts nationwide are added to the Register weekly.

This National Park Service list is complete through NPS recent listings posted December 12, 2025.

== Current listings ==
	Name on the Register	Image	Date listed	Location	City or town	Description
1	Bayhorse	Bayhorse	March 15, 1976 (#76000671)	South of Challis off U.S. Route 93; 44°23′52″N 114°18′42″W	Challis	A silver mining ghost town, part of Land of the Yankee Fork State Park
2	Board-and-Batten Commercial Building	Board-and-Batten Commercial Building	December 3, 1980 (#80001300)	about 260 Main Ave. 44°30′19″N 114°14′09″W	Challis	Built c.1896, removed after June 2008
3	Building at 247 Pleasant Avenue	Building at 247 Pleasant Avenue	December 3, 1980 (#80001301)	247 Pleasant Ave. 44°30′13″N 114°14′10″W	Challis	
4	Buster Meat Market	Buster Meat Market	December 3, 1980 (#80004551)	about 250 Main Ave. 44°30′19″N 114°14′10″W	Challis	Built in 1897, removed before June 2008
5	Bux's Place	Bux's Place	December 3, 1980 (#80001302)	321 Main Ave. 44°30′17″N 114°14′06″W	Challis	
6	Challis Archeological Spring District	Challis Archeological Spring District	February 12, 1981 (#81000206)	Address Restricted	Challis	
7	Challis Bison Jump Site	Challis Bison Jump Site	September 5, 1975 (#75000628)	Address Restricted	Challis	
8	Challis Brewery Historic District	Challis Brewery Historic District	February 5, 1980 (#80001303)	Challis Creek Rd. 44°30′28″N 114°13′38″W	Challis	
9	Challis Cold Storage	Challis Cold Storage	December 3, 1980 (#80001304)	about 300 Main Ave. 44°30′19″N 114°14′07″W	Challis	Built in 1881 for Idaho governor George L. Shoup, collapsed in the 1983 Borah Peak earthquake, killing two children
10	Challis High School	Challis High School	December 3, 1980 (#80001305)	701 Main Ave. 44°30′17″N 114°13′52″W	Challis	Built in 1922, irreparably damaged by the 1983 Borah Peak earthquake, demolished
11	Bill Chivers House	Bill Chivers House	December 3, 1980 (#80001306)	3rd St. 44°30′21″N 114°14′07″W	Challis	
12	Thomas Chivers Cellar	Thomas Chivers Cellar	December 3, 1980 (#80001307)	Challis Creek Rd. 44°30′27″N 114°13′34″W	Challis	
13	Thomas Chivers House	Thomas Chivers House	December 3, 1980 (#80001308)	Challis Creek Rd. 44°30′27″N 114°13′52″W	Challis	
14	Custer County Jail	Custer County Jail	December 3, 1980 (#80001309)	801 Main Ave., Rear; 44°30′18″N 114°13′49″W	Challis	
15	Custer Historic District	Custer Historic District	February 3, 1981 (#81000207)	Along Yankee Fork Road southwest of the city of Challis, within the Challis National Forest; 44°23′15″N 114°41′45″W	Custer	
16	Ivan W. Day House	Ivan W. Day House	April 9, 1986 (#86000754)	Boise Meridian; 44°16′06″N 114°57′05″W	Stanley	
17	East Fork Lookout	East Fork Lookout	September 27, 1976 (#76000672)	Address Restricted	Clayton	
18	False-Front Commercial Building	False-Front Commercial Building	December 3, 1980 (#80001310)	about 291 Main Ave. 44°30′17″N 114°14′09″W	Challis	
19	Emmett Hosford House		December 3, 1980 (#80001311)	3rd St. 44°30′22″N 114°14′07″W	Challis	
20	I.O.O.F. Hall	I.O.O.F. Hall	December 3, 1980 (#80001312)	521 Main Ave. 44°30′17″N 114°13′59″W	Challis	
21	Idaho Mining and Smelter Company Store		February 1, 2006 (#05001601)	One Ford St. 44°15′34″N 114°23′47″W	Clayton	
22	Idaho Rocky Mountain Club		December 9, 1994 (#94001451)	State Highway 75 south of Stanley; 44°05′46″N 114°50′54″W	Stanley	
23	Mackay Episcopal Church	Mackay Episcopal Church	November 17, 1982 (#82000336)	Park Ave. and College; 43°54′40″N 113°36′47″W	Mackay	
24	Mackay Methodist Episcopal Church	Mackay Methodist Episcopal Church	September 7, 1984 (#84001118)	Custer St. and Park Ave. 43°54′48″N 113°36′35″W	Mackay	
25	McKendrick House	McKendrick House	December 3, 1980 (#80001313)	4th St. 44°30′12″N 114°14′03″W	Challis	
26	Niece Brothers' Store		June 12, 1995 (#95000667)	Ace of Diamonds St. 44°12′59″N 114°56′17″W	Stanley	
27	Old Challis Historic District	Old Challis Historic District	December 3, 1980 (#80001314)	Bounded by Valley and Pleasant Aves., 2nd and 3rd Sts. 44°30′13″N 114°14′10″W	Challis	
28	Bill Peck House		December 3, 1980 (#80001315)	16 Main Ave. 44°30′18″N 114°14′17″W	Challis	
29	Penwell House	Penwell House	December 3, 1980 (#80001316)	North Ave. 44°30′23″N 114°13′50″W	Challis	
30	Redfish Archeological District	Redfish Archeological District	December 29, 1983 (#83003574)	Address Restricted	Stanley	
31	Donaldson Rowles House	Donaldson Rowles House	December 3, 1980 (#80001317)	North Ave. 44°30′22″N 114°13′23″W	Challis	
32	Henry Smith House		December 3, 1980 (#80001318)	5th St. 44°30′13″N 114°13′59″W	Challis	
33	Stanley Ranger Station	Stanley Ranger Station	December 15, 1982 (#82001885)	North of Stanley on U.S. Route 93; 44°13′33″N 114°55′44″W	Stanley	
34	Stone and Log Building		December 3, 1980 (#80001320)	Pleasant Ave. 44°30′16″N 114°14′06″W	Challis	
35	Stone Building		December 3, 1980 (#80001319)	3rd St. 44°30′20″N 114°14′07″W	Challis	
36	Twin Peaks Sports	Twin Peaks Sports	December 3, 1980 (#80001321)	500 Main Ave. 44°30′20″N 114°13′59″W	Challis	
37	Clyde Wilkinson House		December 3, 1980 (#80001322)	9th St. 44°30′25″N 114°13′46″W	Challis	
38	Yankee Fork Gold Dredge		June 17, 2021 (#100006663)	300 Yankee Fork Rd. (Forest Service Rd. 013); 44°22′39″N 114°43′22″W	Stanley vicinity	

== See also ==
- List of National Historic Landmarks in Idaho
- National Register of Historic Places listings in Idaho
