= Mesker Brothers =

Competing Manufacturers

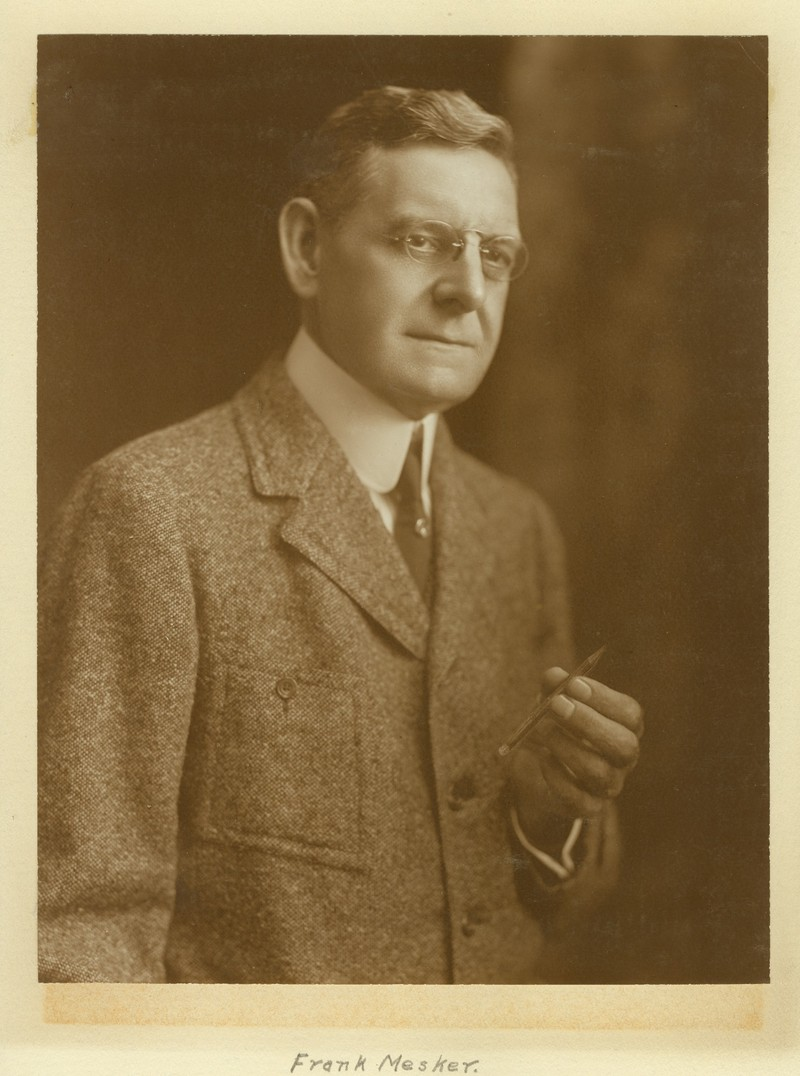
Photograph of Frank Mesker

The Mesker Brothers Iron Works and George L. Mesker & Co. were competing manufacturers and designers of ornamental sheet-metal facades and cast iron storefront components from the 1880s through the mid-twentieth century. The Mesker Brothers Iron Works was based in St. Louis, Missouri, and was operated by brothers Bernard and Frank Mesker. The George L. Mesker Company was operated by a third brother, George L. Mesker, and was based in Evansville, Indiana. The Mesker brothers were the sons of John Mesker who operated a stove business in Evansville and later galvanized iron for buildings. The three brothers learned their iron-working skills from their father.

The companies' products are often referred to as "Meskers." The companies also produced tin ceilings, iron railings, stairs, roof cresting, ventilation grates, iron awnings, skylights, and freight elevators.

The Meskers marketed their products through catalogs displaying their designs. The catalogs were so successful they expanded print runs from 50,000 to 500,000 one year later. According to a 1915 catalog, there were Mesker storefronts in every state, including 4,130 in Indiana, 2,915 in Illinois, 2,646 in Kentucky, and even 17 in the territory of Alaska.

A number of their works are listed on the National Register of Historic Places.

== Works ==
Works by the Meskers include:

- T.J. Abbott Building, Golconda, Illinois
- Buster Meat Market, Main Ave. Challis, Idaho (Mesker Bros.), NRHP-listed
- One or more works in Corydon Historic District (Boundary Increase), Roughly bounded by Summit, Maple & Walnut Sts., College Ave., Chestnut, Capitol, Poplar, Water, Beaver & Mulberry Sts. Corydon, Indiana (Mesker, George L. & Co.), NRHP-listed
- One or more works in Edinburgh Commercial Historic District, roughly bounded by Thompson and Main Sts., the alley N of Main Cross St. and the Conrail RR tracks Edinburgh, Indiana (George L. Mesker & Co.), NRHP-listed
- J. T. Ferguson Store, 11 E. Main St. Wilkesboro, North Carolina (Mesker Bros. Front Builders), NRHP-listed
- Goedert Meat Market, 322 Main St. McGregor, Iowa (Mesker Bros.), NRHP-listed
- Gunning–Purves Building, 311 Main Street, Friendship, Wisconsin (George L. Mesker & Co.), NRHP-listed
- Hopkinton Supply Co. Building, 26-28 Main St. Hopkinton, Massachusetts (Mesker, George L.), NRHP-listed
- Hotel Mann, Virginia, Illinois (Mesker Bros. Iron Works)
- Joseph Jackson Hotel, 2420 S. Main St. Vallonia, Indiana (Mesker. George and Co.), NRHP-listed
- One or more works in Jellico Commercial Historic District, roughly along North and South Main Sts. Jellico, Tennessee (Mesker, George), NRHP-listed
- Jones, J. W. Jones Building, 104 Main St., NE Blackfoot, Idaho (Mesker, Marcus), NRHP-listed
- Len Jus Building (Mason City, Iowa)
- One or more works in Morgantown Historic District, Approx. 4.5 blocks centered on Washington St., bet. Marion St. and E of Church St. Morgantown, Indiana (Mesker, George L. & Co.), NRHP-listed
- One or more works in Mount Vernon Commercial District, Main St. from Church to Richmond Sts. *Mount Vernon, KY (George L. Mesker & Co.), NRHP-listed
- One or more works in North Vernon Downtown Historic District, bounded by Sixth and Chestnut Sts., Keller St., Fourth and Main, and Jennings North Vernon, Indiana (George L. Mesker & Company), NRHP-listed
- Morris Roberts Store, Off U.S. 30 Hagerman, Idaho (Mesker Bros.), NRHP-listed
- J.C. Schmohl Building, Galena, Illinois
- Vollmer Building, Walnut St. Genesee, Idaho (Mesker Bros.), NRHP-listed
- Josephine White Block, 737-739 Cranston St. Providence, Rhode Island (Mesker Bros.), NRHP-listed
- Wilkesboro-Smithey Hotel, Broad and E. Main Sts. Wilkesboro, North Carolina (Mesker Bros. Front Builders), NRHP-listed
- York Dispatch Newspaper Offices, 15 and 17 E. Philadelphia St. York, Pennsylvania (George L. Mesker), NRHP-listed
- Grainfield Opera House, Grainfield, Kansas, NRHP-listed
- Masonic Hall, 632 Main St, Alamosa, Colorado (Mesker & Bro.)

Their work features identically in the History of South Dakota, the History of North Dakota, the History of Montana, and the History of Nebraska.

== Gallery ==
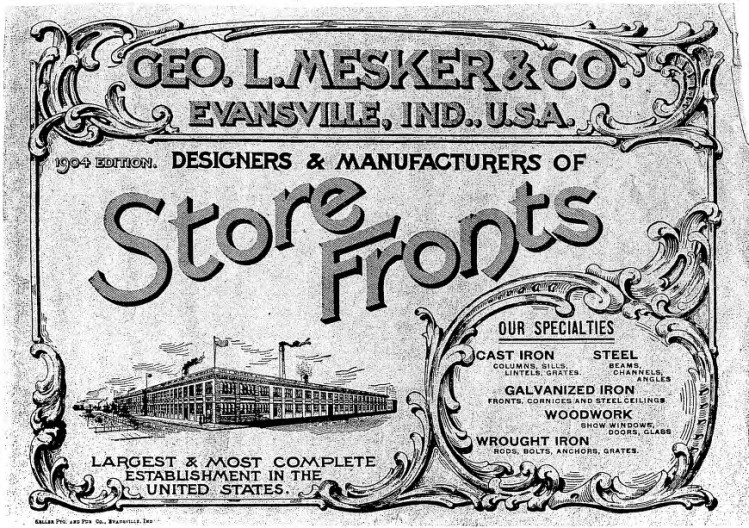
Geo. L. Mesker & Co. catalog, 1904

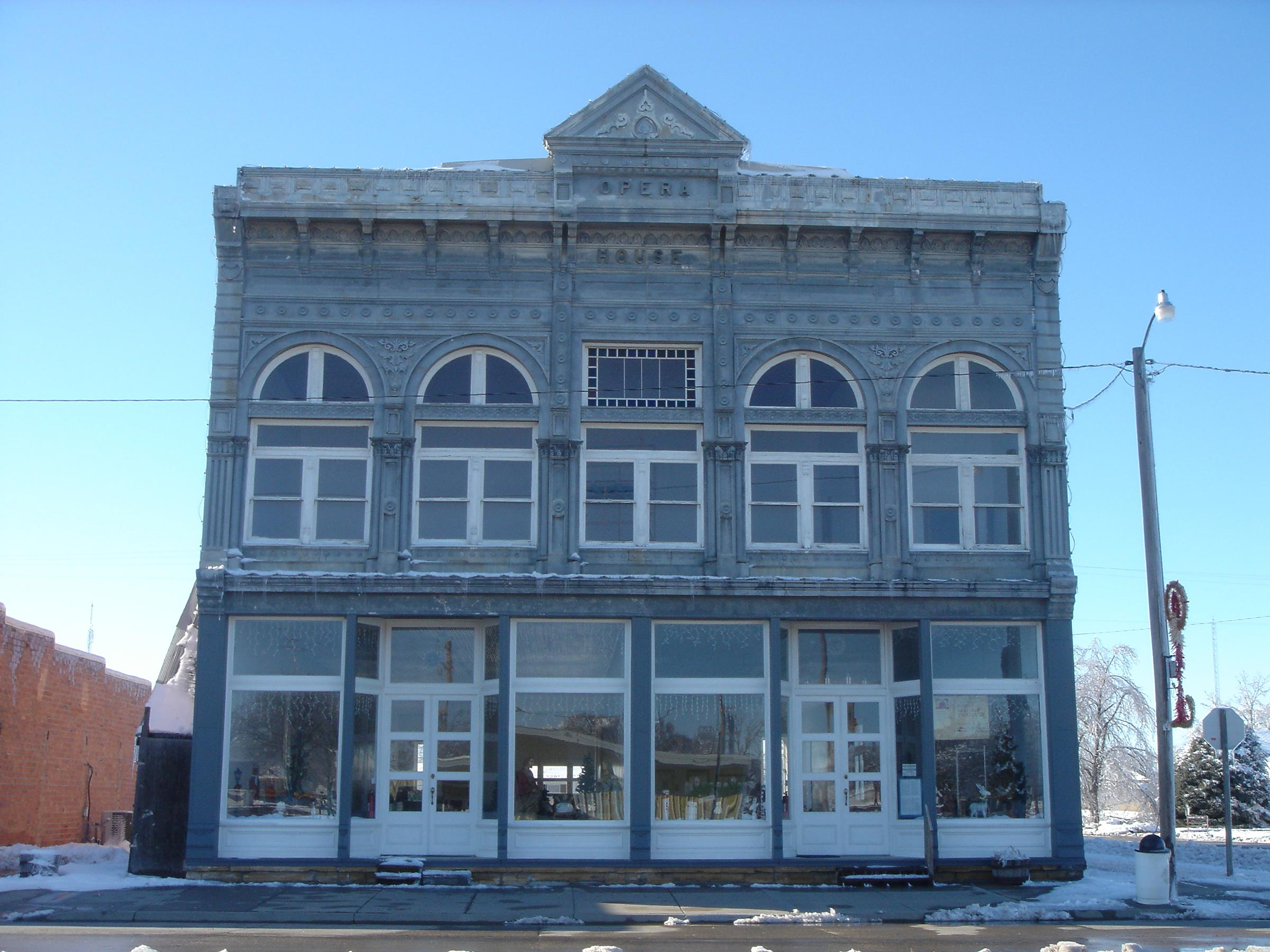
Grainfield Opera House, Grainfield, Kansas

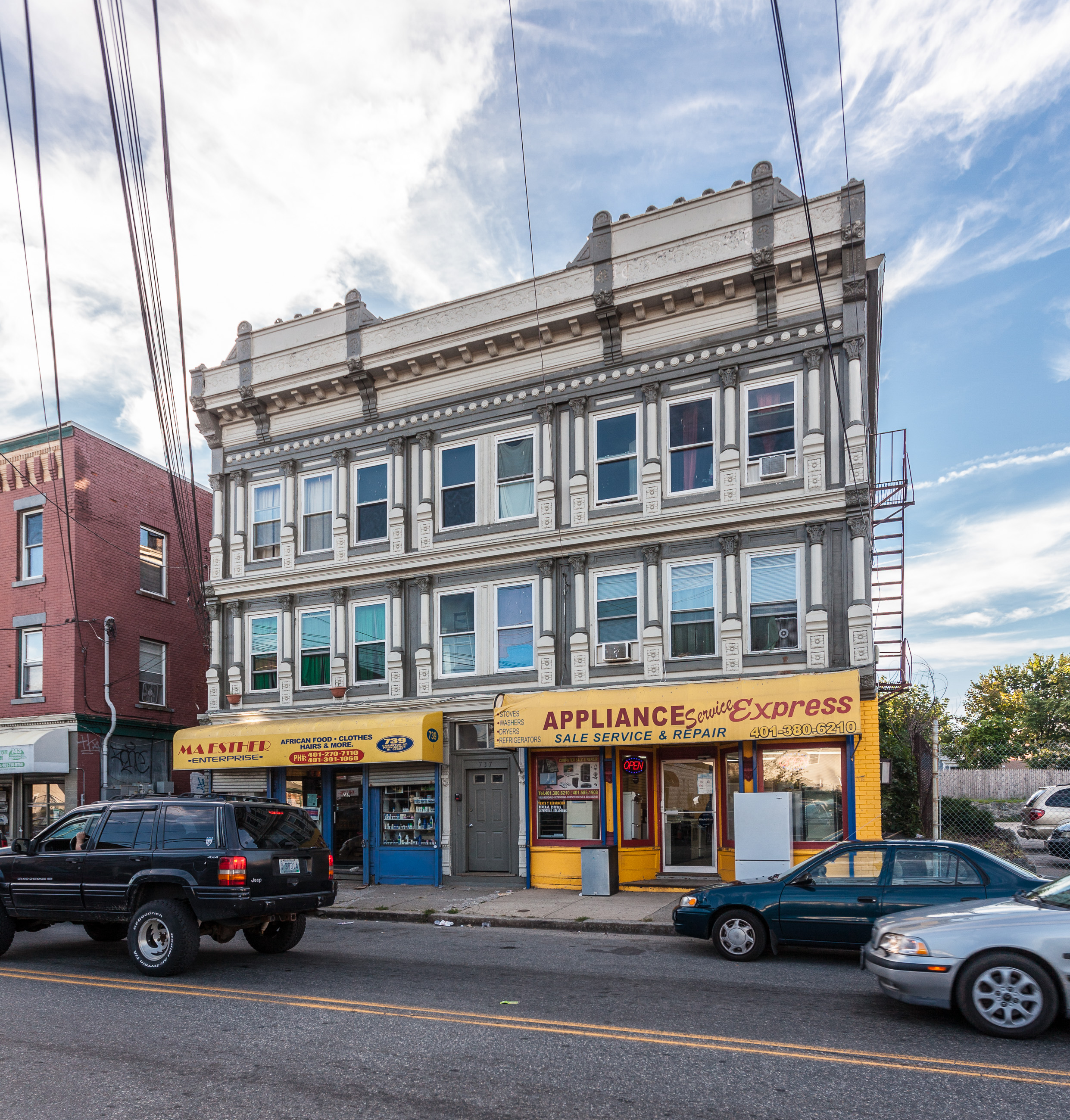
Josephine White Block, Providence, Rhode Island
