= LLJ =

LLJ and llj may refer to:

== Transportation ==
=== Airports ===
- Challis Airport (FAA code) in Idaho, United States
- Silampari Airport (IATA code) in Lubuklinggau, South Sumatra, Indonesia

=== Railways ===
- Lalganj railway station (India Railways station code), a railway station in Uttar Pradesh, India
- Llandudno Junction railway station (National Rail station code) in Wales

== Other uses ==
- Ledji-Ledji language (ISO 639-3 code: llj), an Australian Aboriginal language
- Lithuanian Liberal Youth (Lietuvos Liberalus Jaunimas), a political youth organization
- "Long Live Jahseh", a phrase in support of American rapper and singer XXXTentacion, who was murdererd in 2018
- Low-level jet, a type of jet stream
  - Low Level Jet, a subcomponent in the South American monsoon system
