= Donaldson Rowles House =

Historic house in Idaho, United States

- U.S. National Register of Historic Places
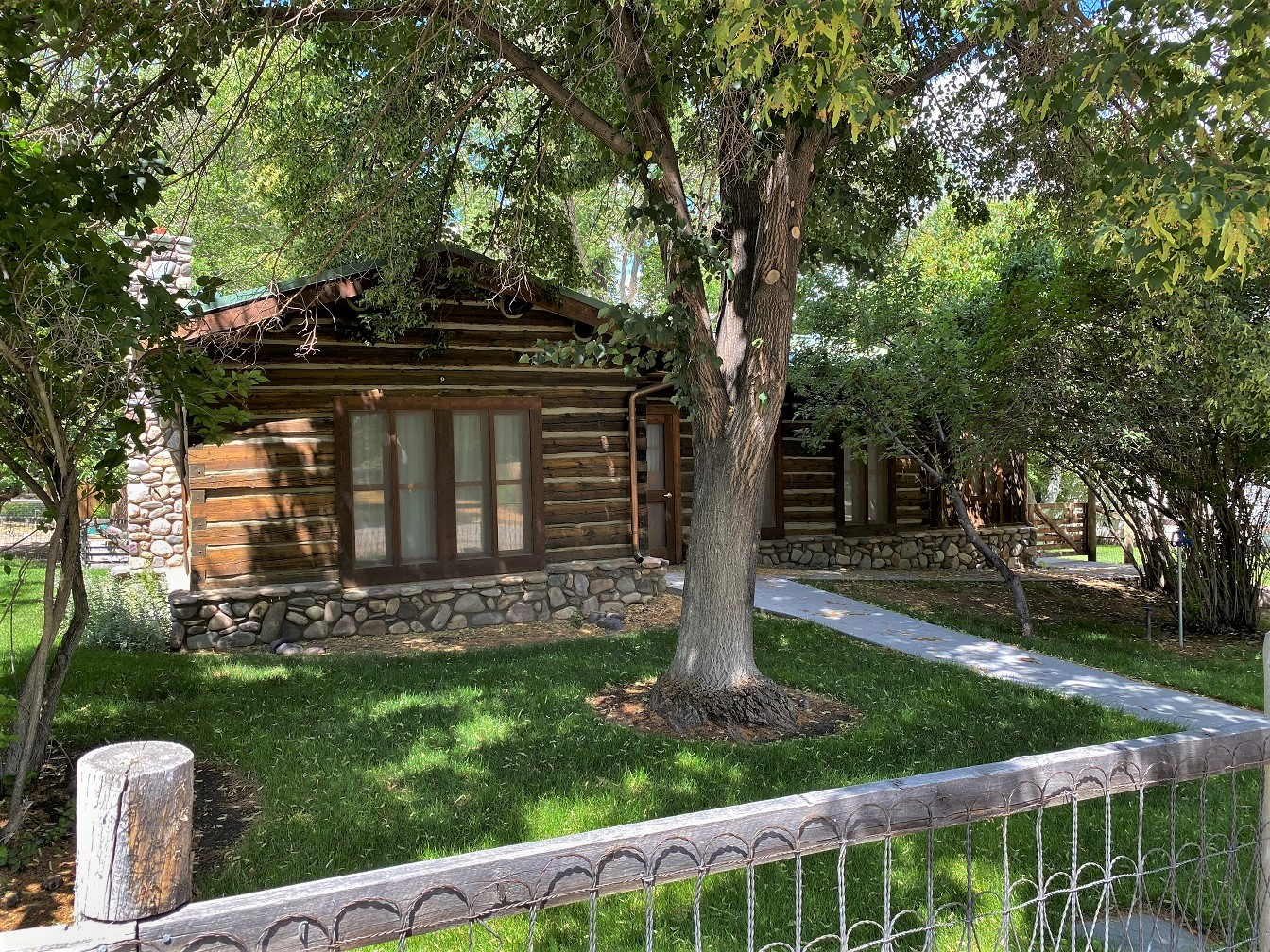
- Donaldson Rowles House in 2023

- Location within Idaho Location within the United States
- Location: North Ave. Challis, Idaho
- Coordinates: 44°30′22″N 114°13′23″W
- Area: less than one acre
- Built: 1910
- Built by: Rowles, Donaldson
- MPS: Challis MRA
- NRHP reference No.: 80001317
- Added to NRHP: December 3, 1980

The Donaldson Rowles House, located on North Ave. in Challis, Idaho, was built in 1910. It was listed on the National Register of Historic Places in 1980.

The house is a log house built of sawn logs by Challis carpenter Donaldson Rowles (b.1885), who was son of Donaldson Rowles, a sheriff living in Challis in 1900. Its original plan, a lateral rectangle with a forward-facing ell, is similar to that of the Bill Chivers House, another NRHP-listed house in Challis. It had a dirt roof which was replaced in 1930 with sheet metal over round log purlins. It was expanded by Rowles in 1926 to add a kitchen and other rooms in board and batten and horizontal log lean-tos on the east and north sides.

It is notable as an "owner-built example of late log architecture in Challis. The house represents the persistence of horizontal log construction into the twentieth century and the use of sawn logs, a rarity in Idaho log construction."
