= Josephine White Block =

- U.S. National Register of Historic Places
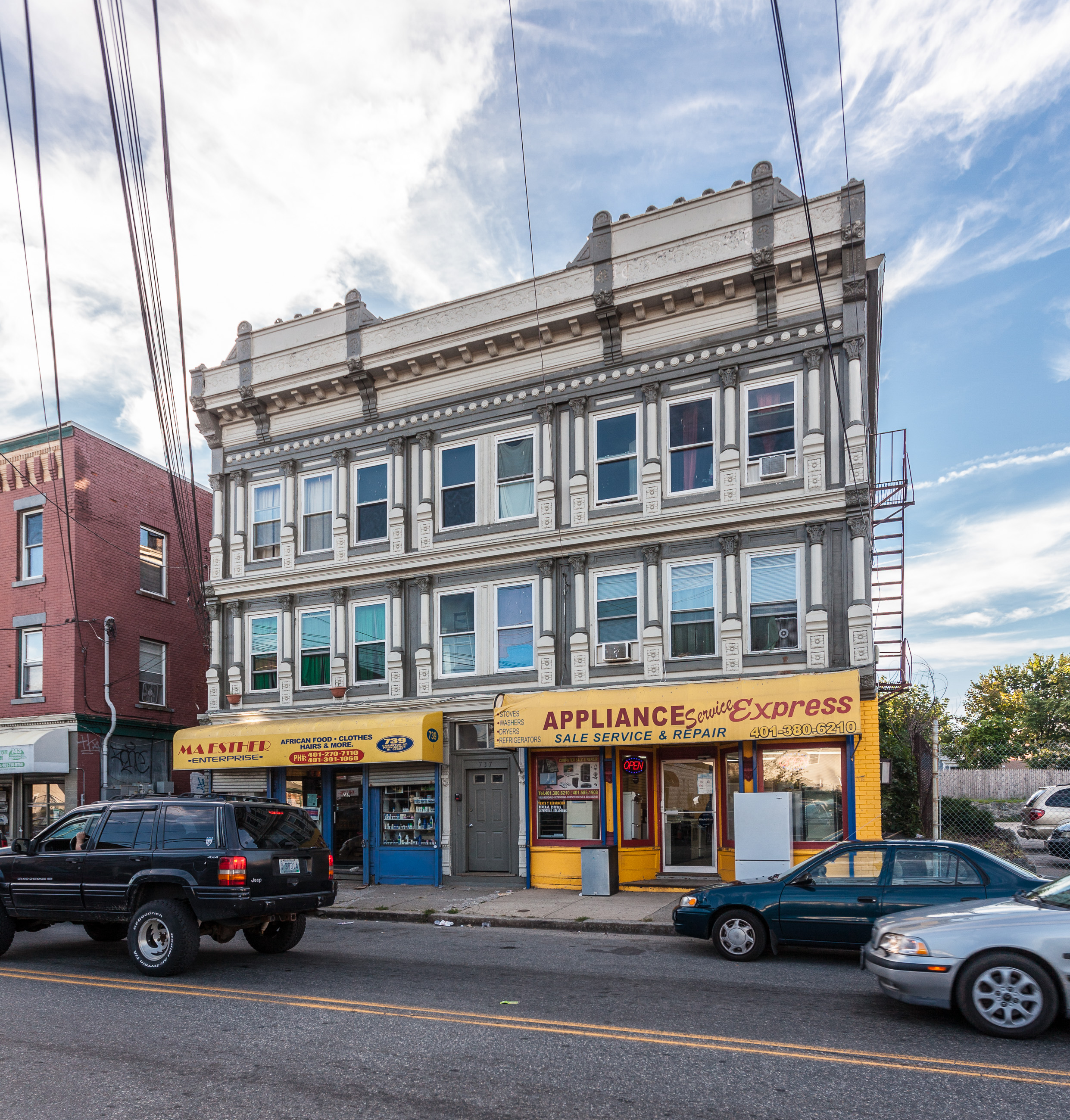
- Josephine White Block in 2013

- Location within Rhode Island Location within the United States
- Location: Providence, Rhode Island
- Coordinates: 41°48′17″N 71°26′18″W
- Area: less than one acre
- Built: 1894
- Architect: Mesker Brothers
- MPS: Elmwood MRA
- NRHP reference No.: 80000014
- Added to NRHP: January 7, 1980

The Josephine White Block is a historic mixed-use commercial and residential building at 737-739 Cranston Street in the Elmwood section of southern Providence, Rhode Island, United States. It is a three-story structure with a stamped-metal facade, and sidewalls of brick (first floor) and clapboard (upper floors). It was built c. 1894 for Josephine White, a widow who lived nearby, and houses two storefronts in the first level and four living units above. The metal facade is the only known local installation of the St. Louis, Missouri-based Mesker Brothers, a nationally known manufacturer of metal architectural elements.

The building was listed on the National Register of Historic Places in 1980.

== See also ==
- National Register of Historic Places listings in Providence, Rhode Island
