= Thomas Chivers Cellar =

- U.S. National Register of Historic Places
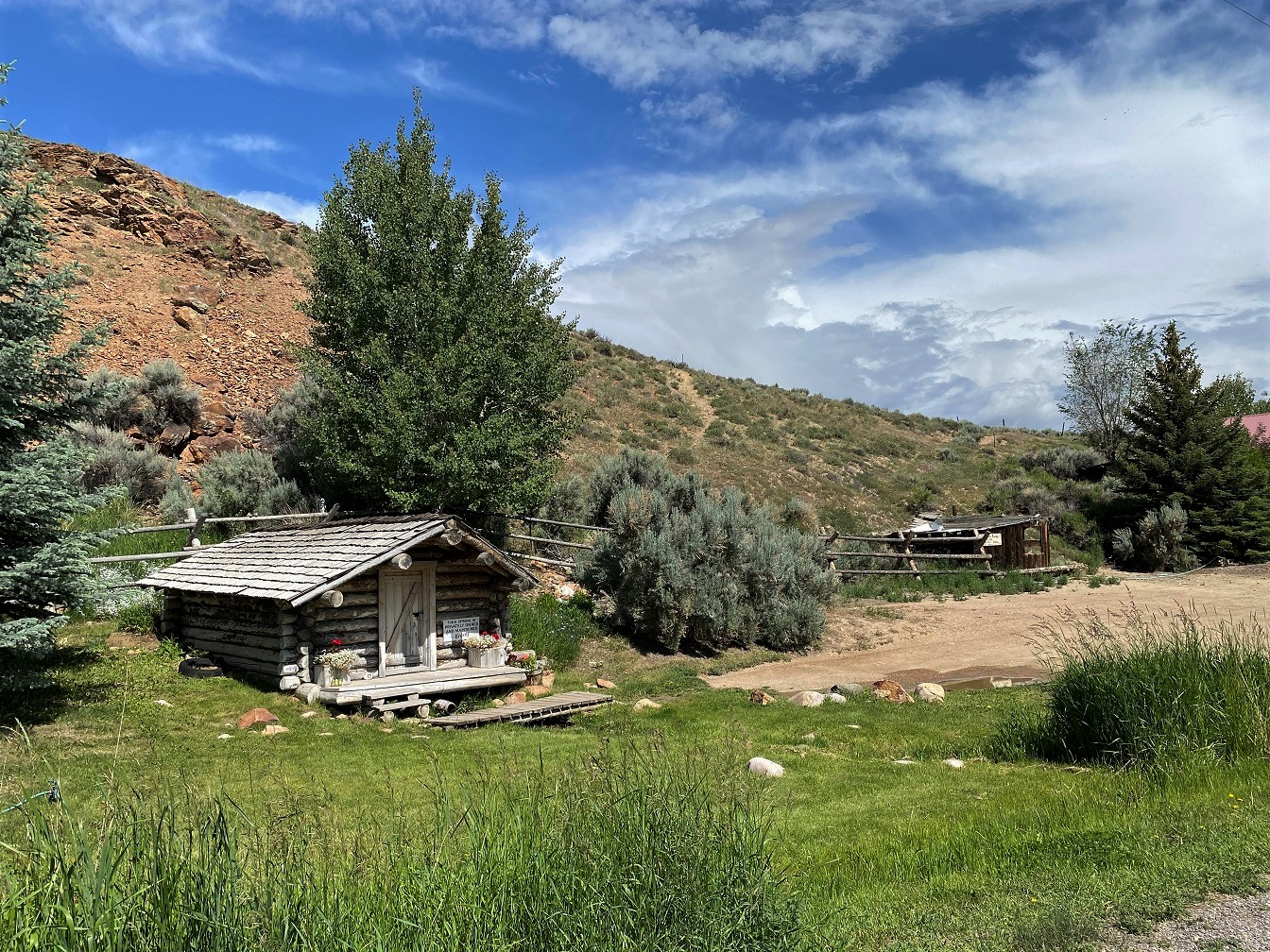
- Thomas Chivers Cellar in 2023

- Location within Idaho Location within the United States
- Location: Challis Creek Rd. Challis, Idaho
- Coordinates: 44°30′27″N 114°13′34″W
- Area: less than one acre
- Built: 1895
- MPS: Challis MRA
- NRHP reference No.: 80001307
- Added to NRHP: December 3, 1980

The Thomas Chivers Cellar, on Challis Creek Rd. in Challis, Idaho was built in 1895. It was listed on the National Register of Historic Places in 1980.

It is a partial dugout building, with horizontal log walls on the outside, vertical log braces on the interior, and dry rock retaining walls extending out from both sides of the front. It is built into the Challis Bluff, and is across the Challis Creek Road from the later Thomas Chivers House. Its logs are of peeled round logs, square-notched at the corners. The roof is dirt-covered, supported by log purlins.

It was deemed significant as "an example of the framing of a log and dugout cellar and a representative of the cellars still extant in Challis. Among those cellars still visible, the Chivers cellar is the best preserved and the most evident from a public right-of-way."
