= Vollmer Building =

- U.S. National Register of Historic Places
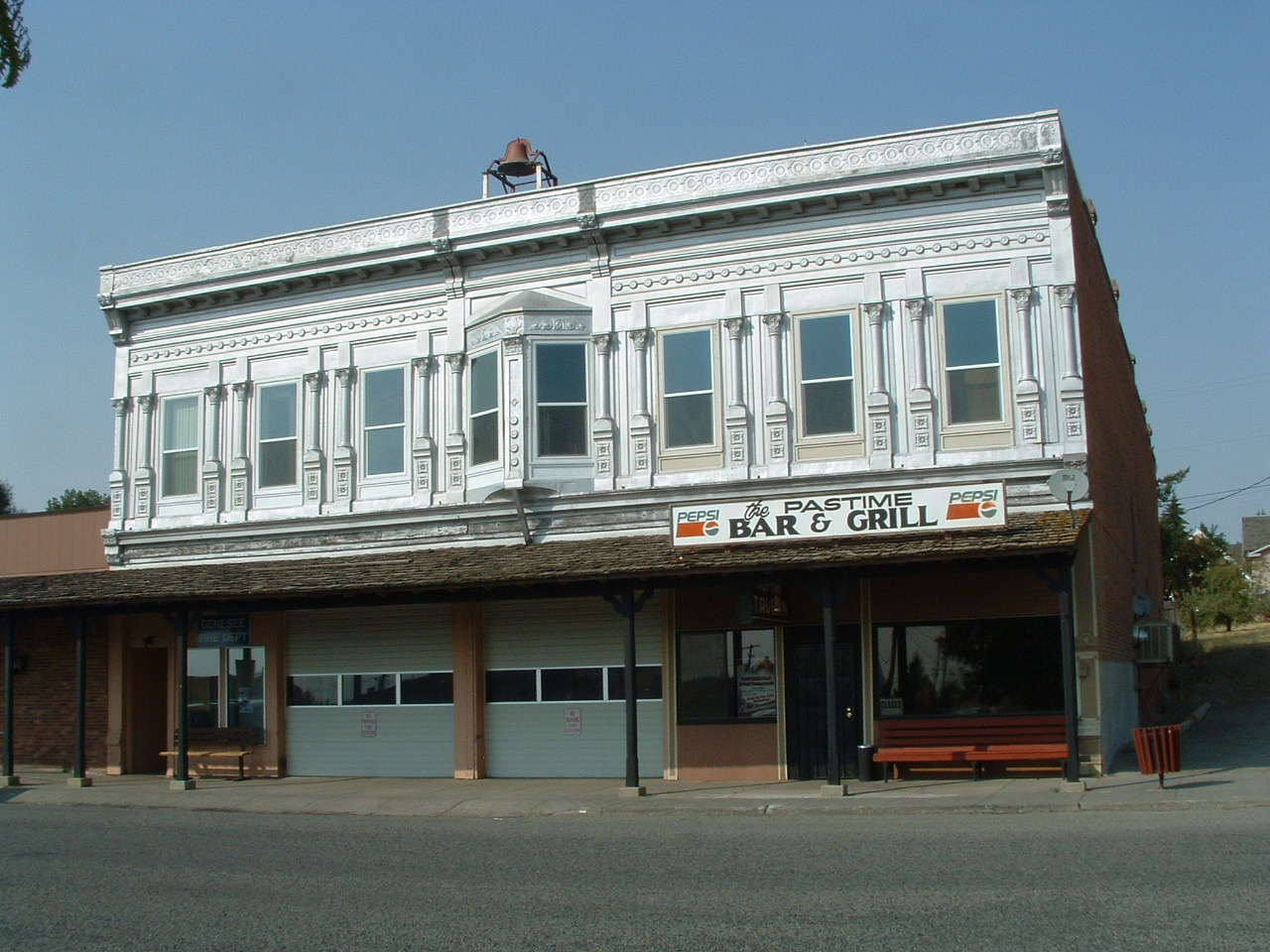
- The building in 2012

- Location within Idaho Location within the United States
- Location: Walnut Street, Genesee, Idaho
- Coordinates: 46°33′04″N 116°55′16″W
- Area: less than one acre
- Built: 1892
- Built by: Mesker Brothers (iron facade)
- NRHP reference No.: 79000797
- Added to NRHP: January 8, 1979

The Vollmer Building is a historic two-story building in Genesee, Idaho. It was built in 1892 with a second-story iron front made by Mesker Brothers of St. Louis, Missouri, three sash windows, and Corinthian pilasters. The structure was originally a warehouse and a grocery store for John P. Vollmer, a businessman from Lewiston, Idaho. It has been listed on the National Register of Historic Places since January 8, 1979. The bottom garage served as the Genesee Fire department’s station till 2019 when a new station was completed. The top floor was used as a community center till 2019 and was moved to the new fire station. The building is now privately owned.
