= Hopkinton Supply Co. Building =

- U.S. National Register of Historic Places
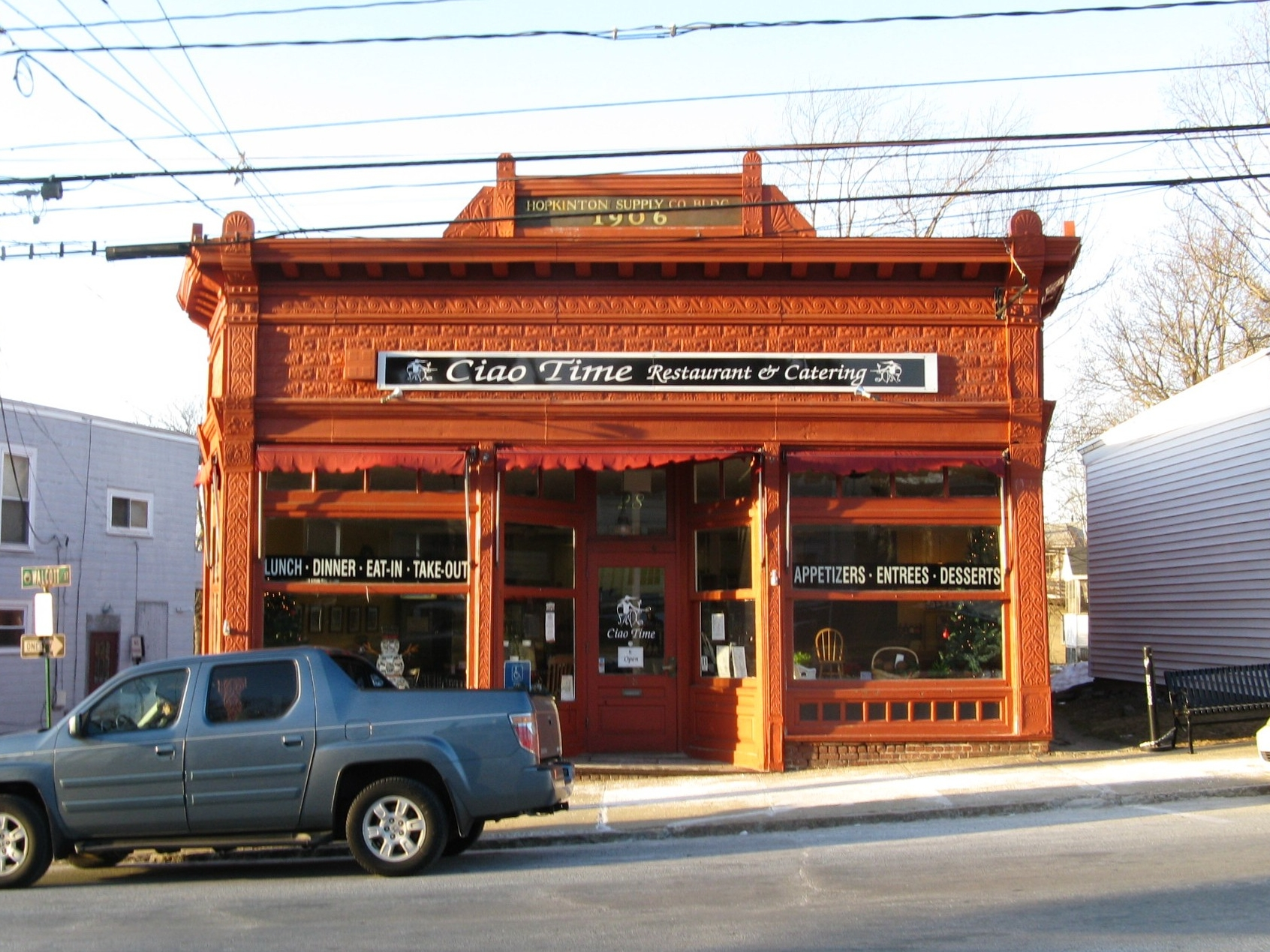
- Hopkinton Supply Company Building

- Location within Massachusetts Location within the United States
- Location: Hopkinton, Massachusetts
- Coordinates: 42°13′43″N 71°31′16″W
- Built: 1906
- Architect: George L. Mesker
- NRHP reference No.: 83000810
- Added to NRHP: March 10, 1983

The Hopkinton Supply Co. Building is a historic commercial building at 26-28 Main Street in Hopkinton, Massachusetts. The single-story pressed metal building was built in 1906, and is a locally unusual example of a mail-order commercial storefront. The storefront was manufactured by the George L. Mesker Company of Evansville, Indiana. It was first occupied by William Morse's Hopkinton Supply Company, and housed a branch of The Great Atlantic & Pacific Tea Company from 1928 to 1954.

The building was listed on the National Register of Historic Places in 1983.

== See also ==
- National Register of Historic Places listings in Middlesex County, Massachusetts
