= Idaho Mining and Smelter Company Store =

- U.S. National Register of Historic Places
- Location within Idaho Location within the United States
- Location: One Ford St., Clayton, Idaho
- Coordinates: 44°15′34″N 114°23′47″W
- Area: less than one acre
- Built: 1880
- Architectural style: Late 19th And Early 20th Century American Movements, False-Front
- NRHP reference No.: 05001601
- Added to NRHP: February 1, 2006

The Idaho Mining and Smelter Company Store, at One Ford St. in Clayton, Idaho was built in about 1880. It was listed on the National Register of Historic Places in 2006.

It is a 29 by 96 feet (8.8 m × 29.3 m) plan building. It has also been known as the Clayton Store.
