= Genesee Exchange Bank =

- U.S. National Register of Historic Places
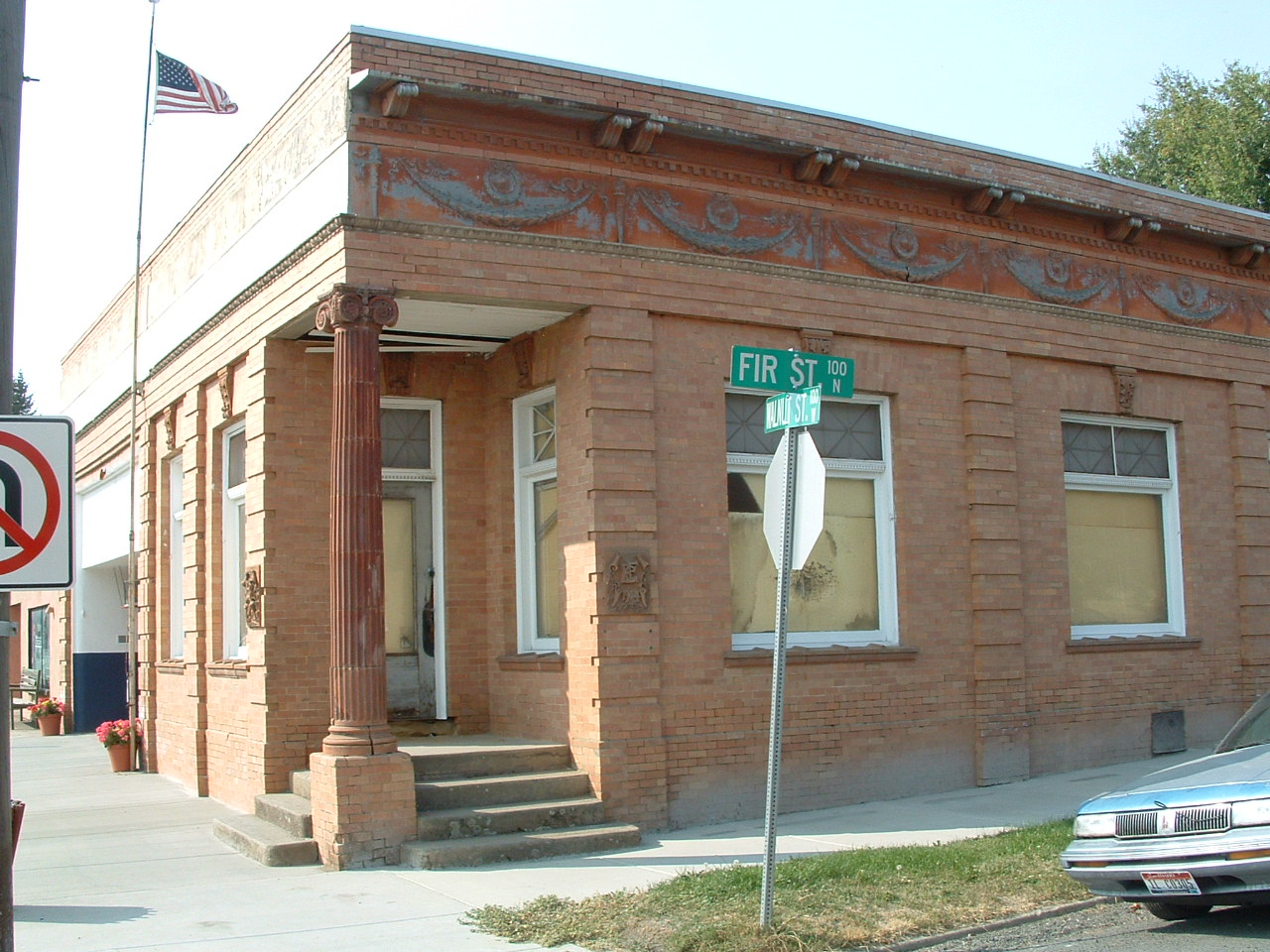

- Location within Idaho Location within the United States
- Location: Genesee (Latah County) Idaho
- Coordinates: 46°33′03″N 116°55′32″W
- Area: less than one acre
- Built: 1904
- Architect: Klapp, Frank & Son
- NRHP reference No.: 79000796
- Added to NRHP: January 8, 1979

The Genesee Exchange Bank is a bank building located on Walnut Street in Genesee, Idaho, United States. The brick building was built in 1904. The Classical Revival building features extensive terra cotta decorations, including an Ionic column at the entrance and a frieze ornamented with garlands.

The building was added to the National Register of Historic Places in 1979. As of September 2012, the western portion of the building is the US Post Office for Genesee; the eastern portion appears to be boarded up. As of April 2016, the structure has been purchased with the intention of renovation.The building is now a coffee shop with the name Stomping Grounds. The inside is restored to look similar to the building originally. The vault is still in place behind the counter of the store.

== See also ==
- National Register of Historic Places listings in Latah County, Idaho
