= Old Challis Historic District =

Historic district in Idaho, United States

- U.S. National Register of Historic Places
- U.S. Historic district
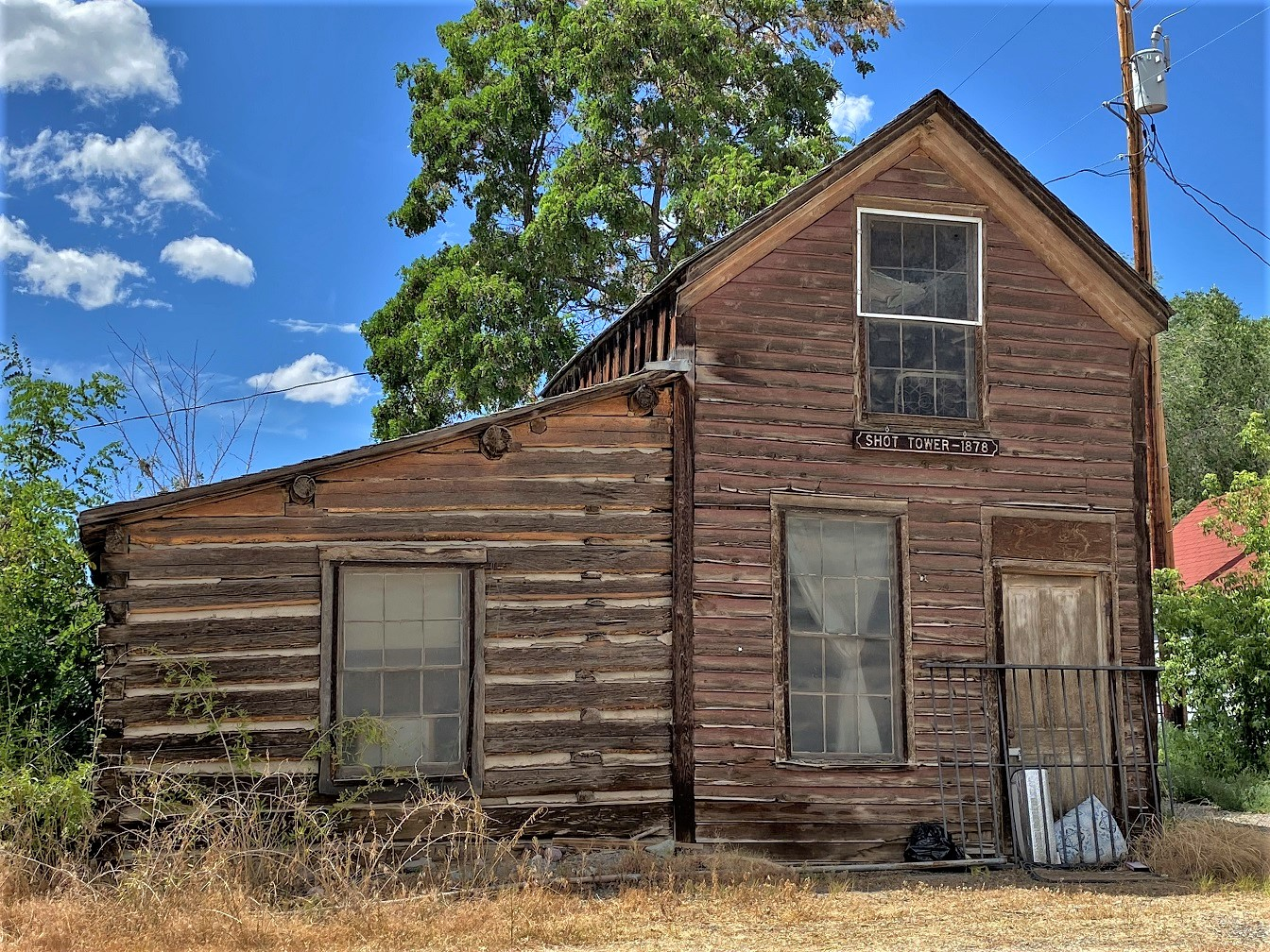
- Frame and log house in 2023

- Location within Idaho Location within the United States
- Location: Bounded by Valley and Pleasant Aves., 2nd and 3rd Sts., Challis, Idaho
- Coordinates: 44°30′13″N 114°14′10″W
- Area: 0.6 acres (0.24 ha)
- MPS: Challis MRA
- NRHP reference No.: 80001314
- Added to NRHP: December 3, 1980

The Old Challis Historic District is a 0.6 acres (0.24 ha) historic district which was listed on the National Register of Historic Places in 1980.

The district is within one block within Valley and Pleasant Aves., 2nd and 3rd Sts. in Challis. It includes three log houses and one board-and-batten house.

In 1980 the buildings were deemed to "remain in fair condition and are potentially preservable for the interpretation of folk architecture."
