= Challis Brewery Historic District =

Historic district in Idaho, United States

- U.S. National Register of Historic Places
- U.S. Historic district
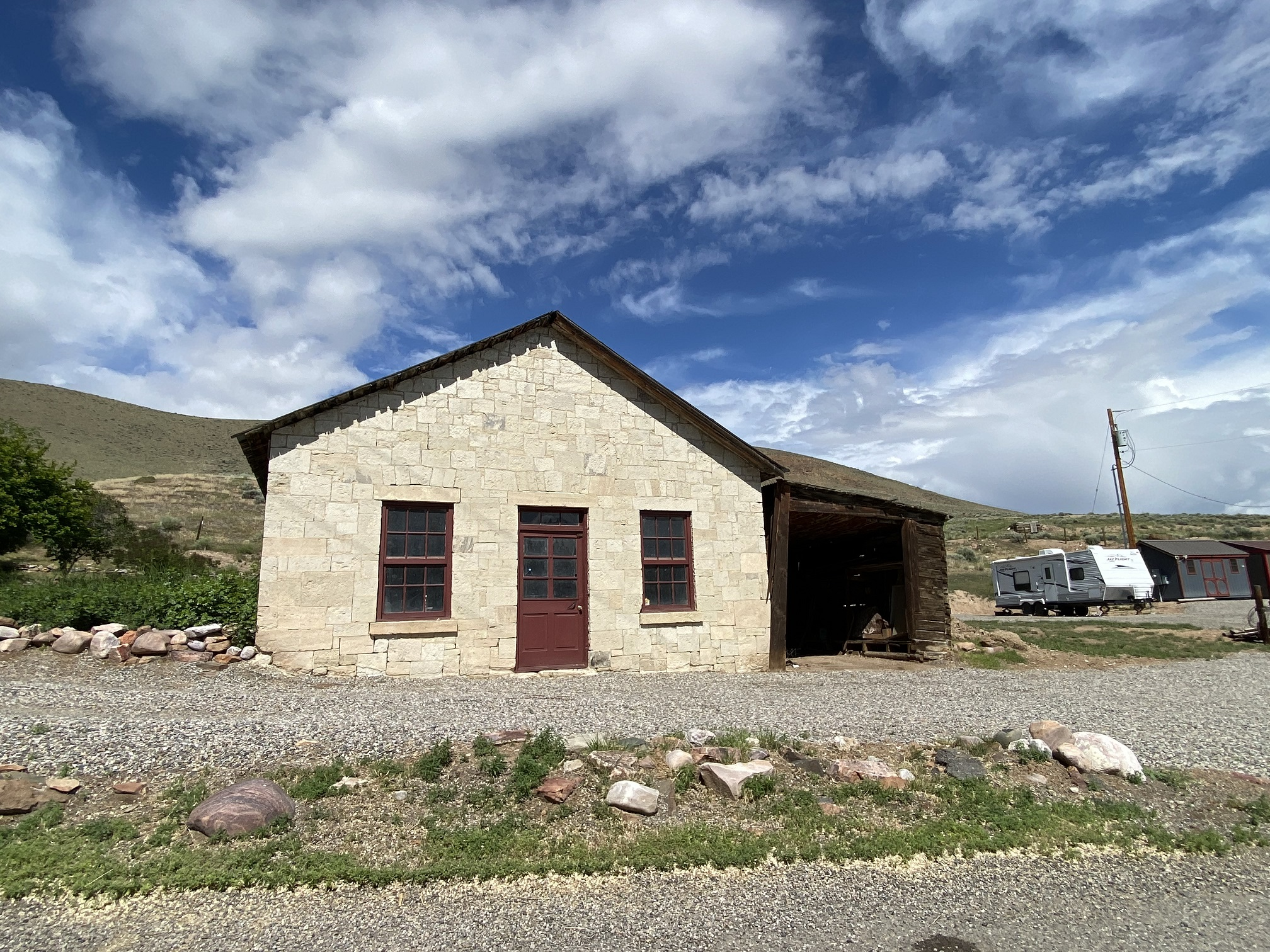
- Challis Brewery in 2023

- Location within Idaho Location within the United States
- Location: Challis Creek Rd. Challis, Idaho
- Coordinates: 44°30′28″N 114°13′38″W
- Area: 10 acres (4.0 ha)
- Built: 1879
- NRHP reference No.: 80001303
- Added to NRHP: February 5, 1980

Challis Brewery Historic District is a historic district listed on the National Register of Historic Places in 1980.

It includes four buildings from the 1879-founded Klug Brewery. Fred Albiez, Ferdinand Klug, and George Fuchs teamed up to open the brewery; it may have closed by 1886.

In 1980 it was claimed that there had been no operating breweries at all in Idaho for twenty years; this brewery was deemed notable as one of only two surviving former breweries.

The main building is a 37.5 by 28 feet (11.4 m × 8.5 m) cut stone and rubble brewery building. There are also two rubble-stone houses and a stone-walled outbuilding, and the stone foundation of another building.
