= Thomas Chivers House =

- U.S. National Register of Historic Places
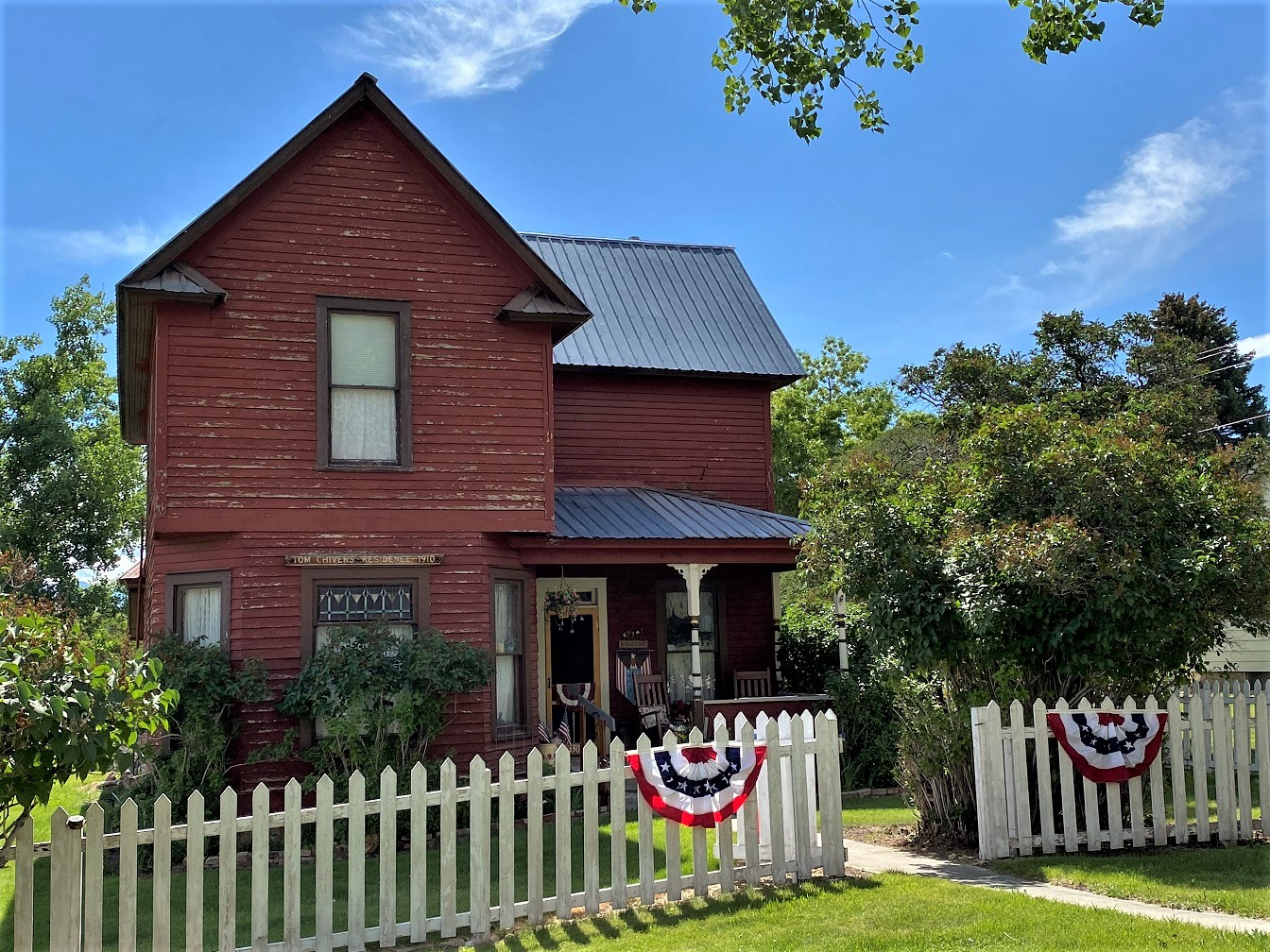
- Thomas Chivers House in 2023

- Location within Idaho Location within the United States
- Location: Challis Creek Rd. Challis, Idaho
- Coordinates: 44°30′27″N 114°13′52″W
- Area: less than one acre
- Built: 1910
- Architectural style: Queen Anne
- MPS: Challis MRA
- NRHP reference No.: 80001308
- Added to NRHP: December 3, 1980

The Thomas Chivers House, on Challis Creek Rd. in Challis, Idaho, was built in 1910. It was listed on the National Register of Historic Places in 1980.

It was assessed to be "the most elaborate, least altered, and best preserved two-story Queen Anne-style house in Challis."

It is relatively large for Challis, and is a plain implementation of Queen Anne style with Colonial Revival influences. It is a frame house built of roughly finished lumber, upon a mortared rock foundation. It has window head moldings, eave returns, and enclosed eaves, as well as the only known stained glass in Challis.

== See also ==
- Thomas Chivers Cellar
