= Grainfield Opera House =

- U.S. National Register of Historic Places
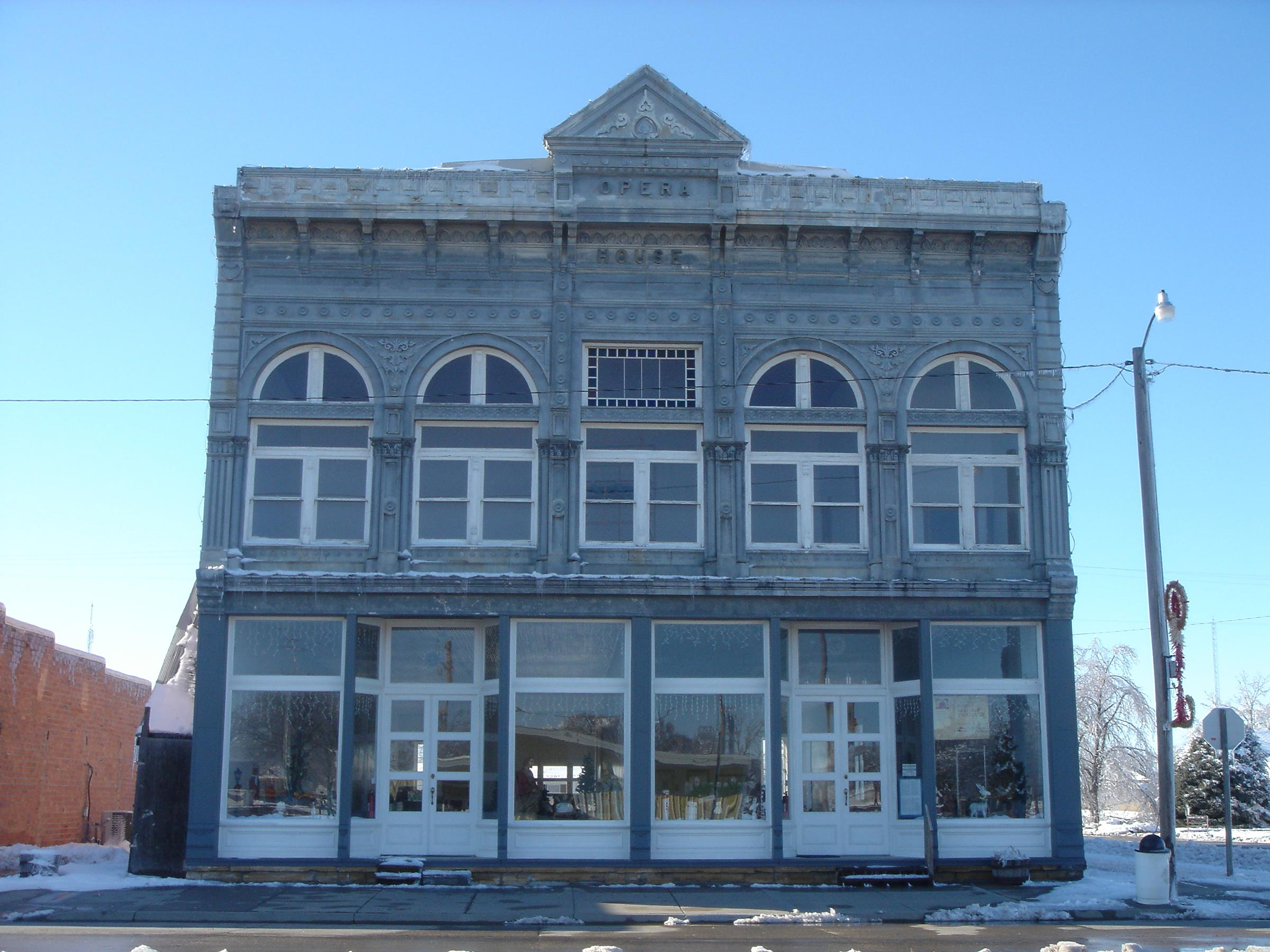

- Location within Kansas Location within the United States
- Location: Main and 3rd Sts., Grainfield, Kansas
- Coordinates: 39°6′48″N 100°27′56″W
- Area: 1 acre (0.40 ha)
- Built: 1887
- NRHP reference No.: 80001467
- Added to NRHP: November 28, 1980

The Grainfield Opera House, located at Main and 3rd Sts. in Grainfield, Kansas, was built in 1887. It was listed on the National Register of Historic Places in 1980. It was built by the Grainfield Town Company, a partnership that had taken ownership of the town area from the railroad. It is notable for its Mesker Brothers cast-iron storefront. The building served as a civic auditorium and community center for Grainfield; it also held several stores, including a harness store, a grocery store, and an auto repair shop.
