= Challis Cold Storage =

- U.S. National Register of Historic Places
- Location within Idaho Location within the United States
- Location: Main Ave., Challis, Idaho
- Coordinates: 44°30′19″N 114°14′7″W
- Area: less than one acre
- Built: 1881
- MPS: Challis MRA
- NRHP reference No.: 80001304
- Added to NRHP: December 3, 1980

The Challis Cold Storage was a historic stone building located at about 300 Main Avenue in Challis, Idaho. It was built in 1881 for Idaho governor George L. Shoup.

It was listed on the National Register of Historic Places in 1980. The building collapsed, killing two children, in the 1983 Borah Peak earthquake.

It was a one-story building with a stepped parapet facade, with part of an outset cornice on its top tier.

The Buster Meat Market, located at about 250 Main Avenue, was another stone building that also was NRHP-listed in 1980, and also no longer exists.
