= Morris Roberts Store =

- Roberts, Morris, Store
- U.S. National Register of Historic Places
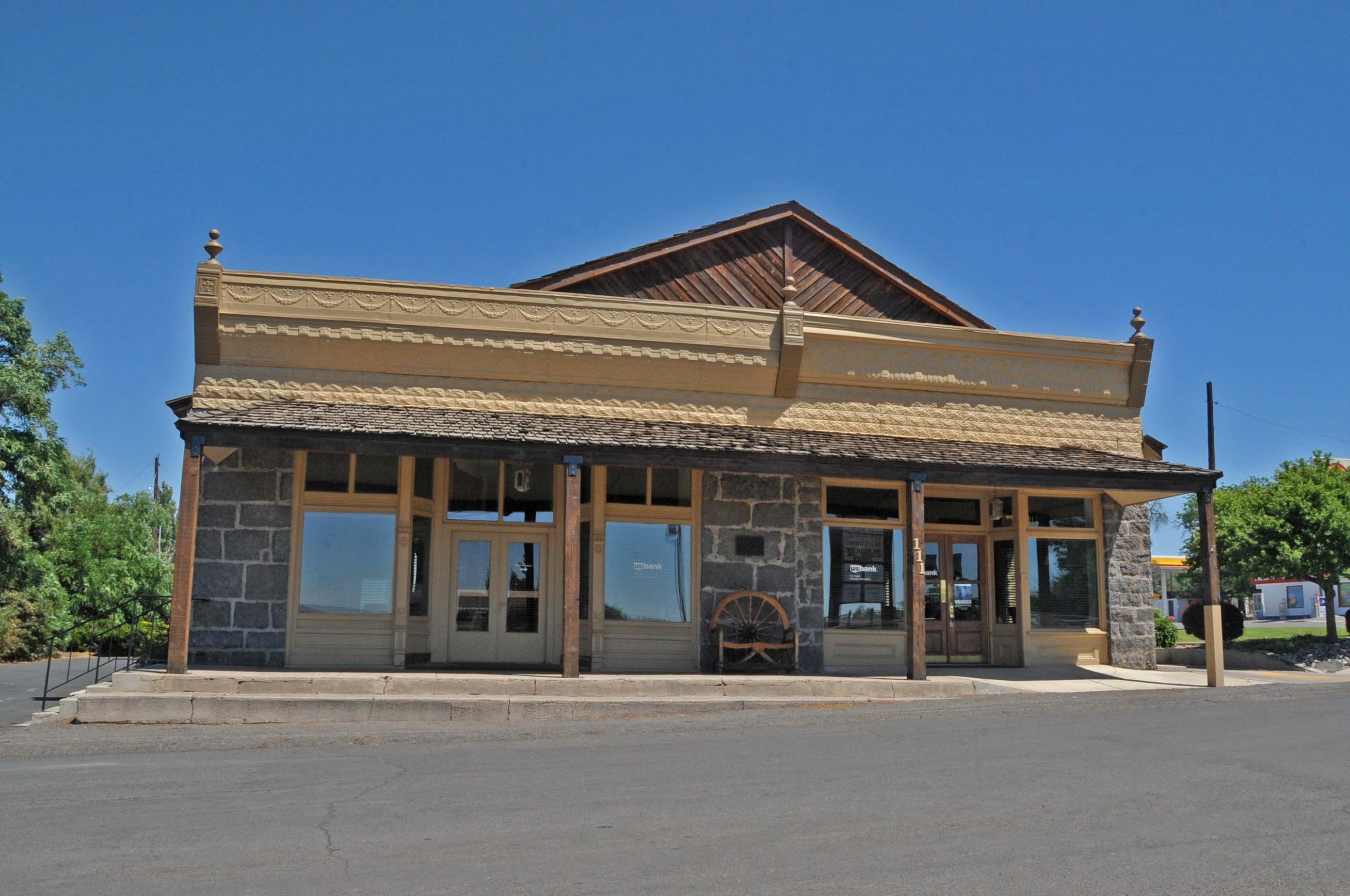
- Photo from 2013 shows building without higher facade which previously blocked view of gable end

- Location within Idaho Location within the United States
- Location: Off U.S. 30, Hagerman, Idaho
- Coordinates: 42°48′43″N 114°53′55″W
- Area: less than one acre
- Built: 1892
- Built by: Mesker Bros.
- NRHP reference No.: 78001062
- Added to NRHP: July 17, 1978

The Morris Roberts Store, located off U.S. 30 in Hagerman, Idaho, was built in 1892. It was listed on the National Register of Historic Places in 1978.

It is a one-story building with three-foot-thick lava rock walls, with a gabled roof. It has a Western false front architecture facade, including a Mesker Brothers stamped metal cornice. It has two store areas, the west one built in 1892 and the east one built as a bank in 1905. The listing reports it as two contributing buildings.
