= Buster Meat Market =

- U.S. National Register of Historic Places
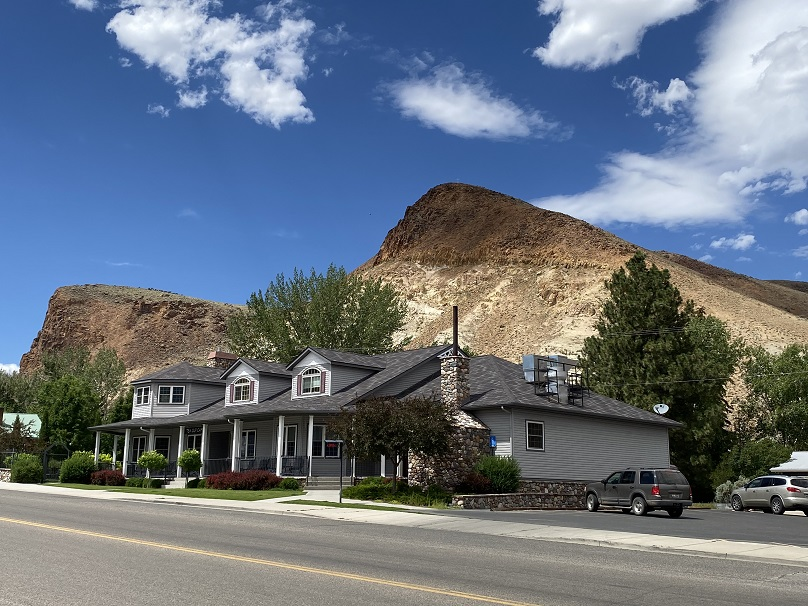
- Site of the building

- Location within Idaho Location within the United States
- Location: Main Ave., Challis, Idaho
- Coordinates: 44.505010°N 114.236740°W
- Area: Less than one acre
- Built: 1897
- Built by: Mesker Bros.
- MPS: Challis MRA
- NRHP reference No.: 80004551
- Added to NRHP: December 3, 1980

The Buster Meat Market, located at about 250 Main Ave. in Challis in Custer County, Idaho, USA, was a historic building constructed in c.1897. It was listed on the National Register of Historic Places in 1980.

It was a one-story stone building with a galvanized iron front manufactured by the Mesker Bros. of St. Louis, Missouri. It was built for George McGowan, a merchant, and was rented to William Buster until Buster purchased the building. The building was considered the finest building in Challis for a number of years.

The building no longer exists. (Note: In October 2017, Google Maps' Streetview photography dated June 2008 shows the location, with a space where the building was located between two wooden buildings that survived in 2008 and appeared adjacent to the Buster Meat Market in its 1980 NRHP registration photo. Google satellite imagery from 2017 showed those flanking buildings also gone, replaced by the Tea Cup Cafe and Bakery and its parking lot.)

Another NRHP-listed stone building, the Challis Cold Storage, located at about 300 Main Ave., collapsed in the 1983 Borah Peak earthquake.
