= Bux's Place =

- U.S. National Register of Historic Places
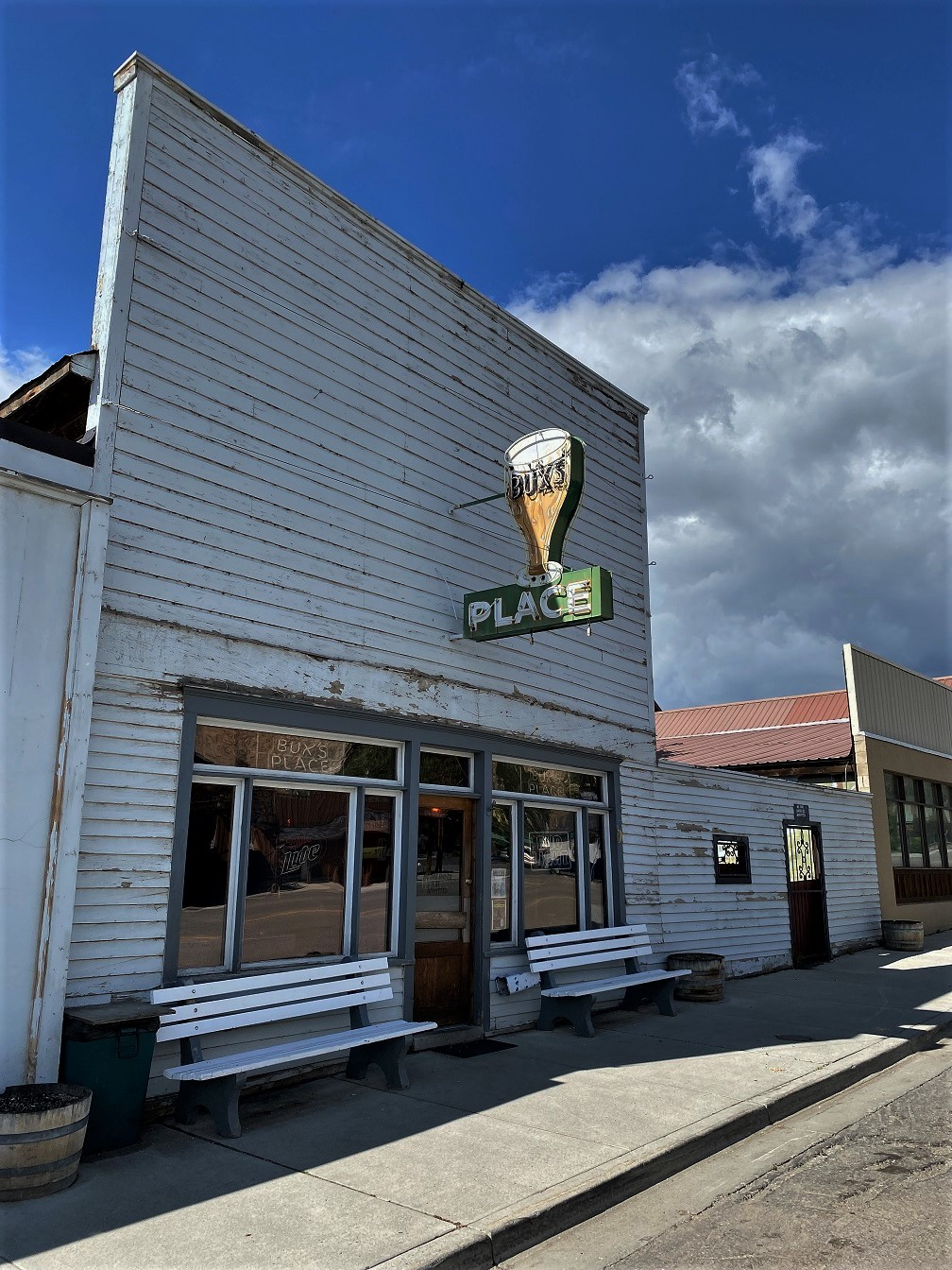
- Bux's Place in 2023

- Location within Idaho Location within the United States
- Location: 321 Main Ave. Challis, Idaho
- Coordinates: 44°30′17″N 114°14′6″W
- Area: less than one acre
- Built: c.1885
- MPS: Challis MRA
- NRHP reference No.: 80001302
- Added to NRHP: December 3, 1980

Bux's Place in Challis, Idaho was listed on the National Register of Historic Places in 1980. It is a two-story log building which is significant as the only one known to be log and surviving of commercial buildings on Main Avenue in Challis in the 1880s. In 1980, the building had a neon sign reading "Bux's Place". Its front lower fenestration dated from the 1930s.
