= Twin Peaks Sports =

- U.S. National Register of Historic Places
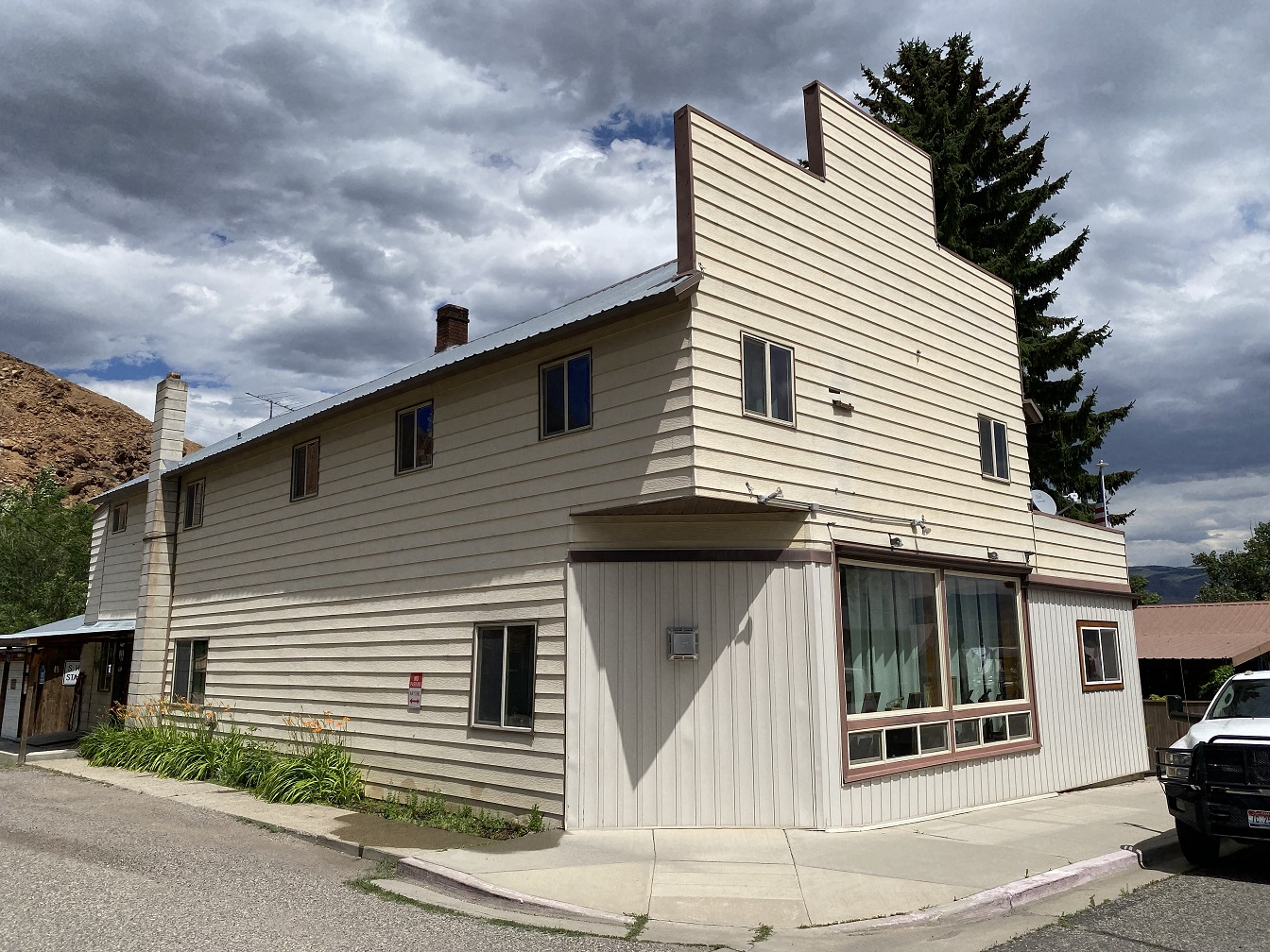
- Twin Peaks Sports in 2023

- Location within Idaho Location within the United States
- Location: Main Ave. Challis, Idaho
- Coordinates: 44°30′20″N 114°13′59″W
- Area: less than one acre
- Built: 1909
- MPS: Challis MRA
- NRHP reference No.: 80001321
- Added to NRHP: December 3, 1980

Twin Peaks Sports, located on Main Avenue in Challis, Idaho, was built in 1909. It was listed on the National Register of Historic Places in 1980.

It is a two-story commercial building with a stepped false front parapet, a molded cornice, and a hooded corner entrance. It was deemed historically notable despite alterations to the building due to it having "the most elaborate expression of framed false-front architecture in Challis. The stepped parapet and hooded corner entrance are distinctive among the Main Avenue buildings, and the use of the classic cornice is representative of commercial architecture in the town."

A Dr. Lynn is remember to have used the second floor for his offices and the first floor as a drug store.
