= Challis Airport =

Airport in Custer County, Idaho, US

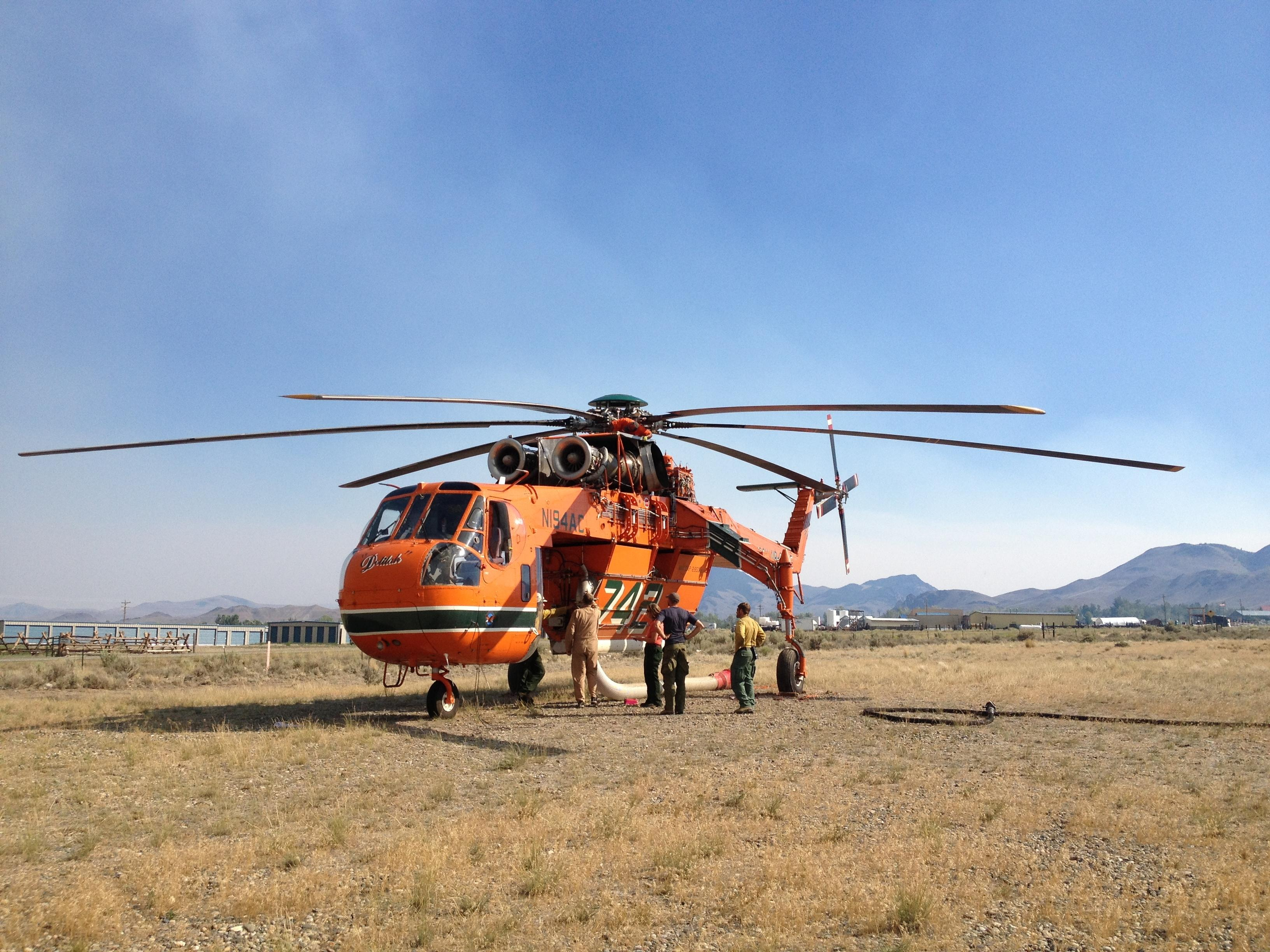
- IATA: CHL; ICAO: KLLJ; FAA LID: LLJ

Summary
- Airport type: Public
- Owner: City of Challis
- Location: Challis, Idaho
- Elevation AMSL: 5,072 ft (1,546 m)
- Coordinates: 44°31′25″N 114°13′04″W

Map
- Interactive map of Challis Airport

Runways
Direction	Length		Surface
Direction	ft	m	Surface
16/34	4,600	1,402	Asphalt

Statistics (2006)
- Aircraft operations: 16,350
- Source: Federal Aviation Administration

Challis Airport (IATA: CHL, ICAO: KLLJ, FAA LID: LLJ) is a city-owned public-use airport located one mile (1.6 km) northeast of the central business district of Challis, a city in Custer County, Idaho, United States.

Although most U.S. airports use the same three-letter location identifier for the FAA and IATA, Challis Airport is assigned LLJ by the FAA and CHL by the IATA (which assigned LLJ to Silampari Airport in Indonesia).

== Facilities and aircraft ==
Challis Airport covers an area of 149 acres (60 ha) which contains one asphalt paved runway (17/35) measuring 4,600 ft × 60 ft (1,402 m × 18 m). For the 12-month period ending May 22, 2006, the airport had 16,350 aircraft operations, an average of 44 per day: 65% general aviation, 34% air taxi and 1% military.

== See also ==
- List of airports in Idaho
