= Clayton, Idaho =

- City
- Location of Clayton in Custer County, Idaho
- Coordinates: 44°15′31″N 114°22′56″W
- Country: United States
- State: Idaho
- County: Custer

Area
  - Total: 0.012 sq mi (0.03 km^{2})
  - Land: 0.012 sq mi (0.03 km^{2})
  - Water: 0 sq mi (0.00 km^{2})
- Elevation: 5,729 ft (1,746 m)

Population (2020)
  - Total: 10
  - Density: 860/sq mi (330/km^{2})
- Time zone: UTC-7 (Mountain (MST))
  - Summer (DST): UTC-6 (MDT)
- ZIP code: 83227
- Area code: 208
- FIPS code: 16-15490
- GNIS feature ID: 2409475

Clayton is a city and hamlet in Custer County, Idaho, United States. The population was 10 at the 2020 census, up from 7 in the 2010 census. It is adjacent to the Salmon River.

== History ==
Clayton was founded in 1881 as a smelter site for the nearby mines.

=== Clayton Silver Mine ===
The Clayton Silver Mine is located in the Bayhorse Mining District of Custer County, and was historically one of the most active producers of silver, lead, and zinc in Idaho outside of the Coeur d’Alene district. The mine was discovered in 1877, but development was sporadic until the Clark Mining Company began prospecting in 1927. At that time, the property was known as the Camp Bird Group and consisted of 25 patented and seven unpatented claims.

The mine was largely operational from 1935 to 1986. During the 1980s, the site utilized older processing equipment and mining methods that affected the grade of the milled ore. Operations ended in 1986 due to low metal prices, although the mine remained in mineralized zones at the time of closure. Recorded production between 1935 and 1986 totaled approximately 7 million troy ounces of silver, 86.8 million pounds of lead, 28.2 million pounds of zinc, 1.7 million pounds of copper, and 1,454 troy ounces of gold from roughly 2,145,000 tonnes of ore.

Modern information regarding the site is derived from historical mine plans and surveys maintained by the United States and Idaho Geological Surveys.

== Geography ==
According to the United States Census Bureau, the city has a total area of 0.01 square miles (2.6 ha), all of it land, which makes it the smallest incorporated city of Idaho, and the smallest incorporated city of the US.

=== Climate ===
This climatic region is typified by large seasonal temperature differences, with warm to hot (and often humid) summers and cold (sometimes severely cold) winters. According to the Köppen Climate Classification system, Clayton has a humid continental climate, abbreviated "Dfb" on climate maps.

== Highway ==
- SH-75 - Salmon River Scenic Byway

Clayton is located on State Highway 75, between Stanley (west) and Challis (northeast).

== Demographics ==
Historical population
Census	Pop.	Note	%±
1890	252		—
1900	186		−26.2%
1910	170		−8.6%
1920	215		26.5%
1930	311		44.7%
1940	114		−63.3%
1950	100		−12.3%
1960	75		−25.0%
1970	36		−52.0%
1980	43		19.4%
1990	26		−39.5%
2000	27		3.8%
2010	7		−74.1%
2020	10		42.9%

=== 2010 census ===
As of the census of 2010, there were 7 people, 4 households, and 2 families residing in the city. The population density was 700.0 inhabitants per square mile (270.3/km^{2}). There were 18 housing units at an average density of 1,800.0 per square mile (695.0/km^{2}). The racial makeup of the city was 100.0% White.

There were 4 households, of which 25.0% had children under the age of 18 living with them, 50.0% were married couples living together, and 50.0% were non-families. 50.0% of all households were made up of individuals, and 25% had someone living alone who was 65 years of age or older. The average household size was 1.75 and the average family size was 2.50.

The median age in the city was 57.5 years. 14.3% of residents were under the age of 18; 0% were between the ages of 18 and 24; 28.6% were from 25 to 44; 14.3% were from 45 to 64; and 42.9% were 65 years of age or older. The gender makeup of the city was 57.1% male and 42.9% female.

=== 2000 census ===
As of the census of 2000, there were 27 people, 12 households, and 6 families residing in the city. The population density was 2,105.2 inhabitants per square mile (812.8/km^{2}). There were 23 housing units at an average density of 1,793.4 per square mile (692.4/km^{2}). The racial makeup of the city was 100.00% White.

There were 12 households, out of which 16.7% had children under the age of 18 living with them, 50.0% were married couples living together, and 50.0% were non-families. 33.3% of all households were made up of individuals, and 8.3% had someone living alone who was 65 years of age or older. The average household size was 2.25 and the average family size was 3.17.

In the city, the population was spread out, with 25.9% under the age of 18, 3.7% from 18 to 24, 7.4% from 25 to 44, 51.9% from 45 to 64, and 11.1% who were 65 years of age or older. The median age was 48 years. For every 100 females, there were 80.0 males. For every 100 females age 18 and over, there were 66.7 males.

The median income for a household in the city was $50,625, and the median income for a family was $30,625. Males had a median income of $21,875 versus $28,750 for females. The per capita income for the city was $11,996. There were no families and 15.8% of the population living below the poverty line, including no under eighteens and none of those over 64.
