= Bill Chivers House =

Historic house in Idaho, United States

- U.S. National Register of Historic Places
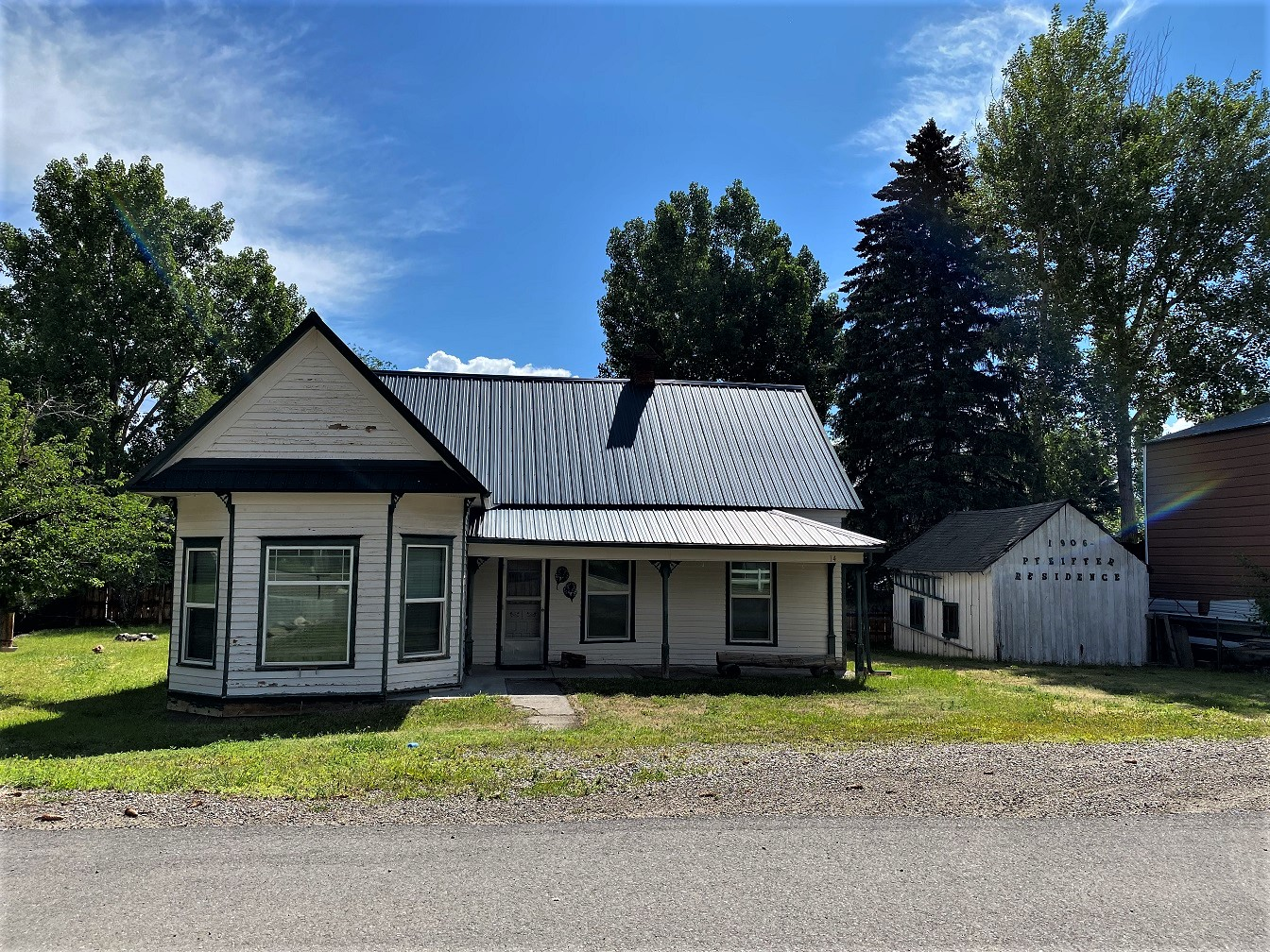
- Bill Chivers House in 2023

- Location within Idaho Location within the United States
- Location: 3rd St. Challis, Idaho
- Coordinates: 44°30′21″N 114°14′7″W
- Area: less than one acre
- Built: 1900
- Built by: Thomas Jose
- Architectural style: Colonial Revival, Queen Anne
- MPS: Challis MRA
- NRHP reference No.: 80001306
- Added to NRHP: December 3, 1980

The Bill Chivers House, on 3rd St. in Challis in Custer County, Idaho, is a historic house built in 1900. It was listed on the National Register of Historic Places in 1980.

It is a one-story house asserted to have elements of Queen Anne and Colonial Revival styles. Its Idaho State Historical Society review states:

The most decorated one-story Queen Anne-style house in Challis is still pretty plain. The Bill Chivers House survives in good and apparently unaltered condition except for the asphalt shingles.. Features common to Challis domestic buildings are exemplified in this building: the blend of Queen Anne and American colonial revival features, the use of delicate porch posts and hipped porch roofs, and the nearly invariable enclosure of eaves.

It was built by Australian-born farmer Thomas Jose for his daughter and her husband Bill Chivers.
