= Mackay Methodist Episcopal Church =

Historic church in Idaho, United States

- U.S. National Register of Historic Places
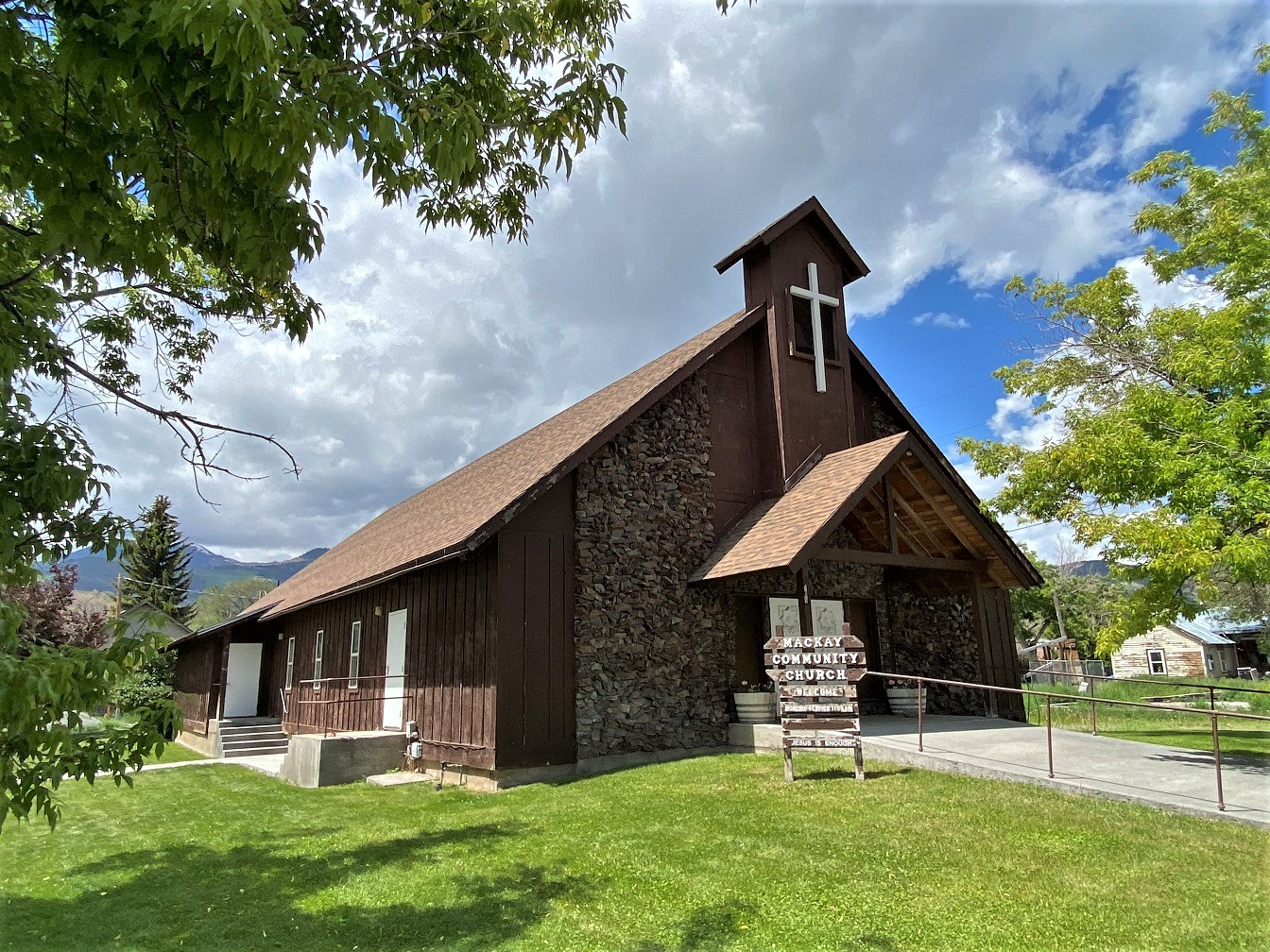
- Mackay Community Church in 2023

- Location within Idaho Location within the United States
- Location: Custer Street and Park Avenue, Mackay, Idaho
- Coordinates: 43°54′48″N 113°36′35″W
- Area: less than one acre
- Built: 1901
- NRHP reference No.: 84001118
- Added to NRHP: September 7, 1984

The Mackay Methodist Episcopal Church, located at Custer Street (U.S. Route 93) and Park Avenue in Mackay, Idaho, was built in 1901. It was listed on the National Register of Historic Places in 1984.

It is a 1 1/2-story wood-frame building built for the Methodist Episcopal church of Mackay during Mackay's boom year of 1901. It was expanded with a rear ell in 1945. It has also been known as Mackay Community Church or the "community church", perhaps because the other two churches in Mackay (the 1912 St. Barbara's Catholic Church and the 1902 Mackay Episcopal Church) were served by outside ministers.
