= Genesee, Idaho =

- City
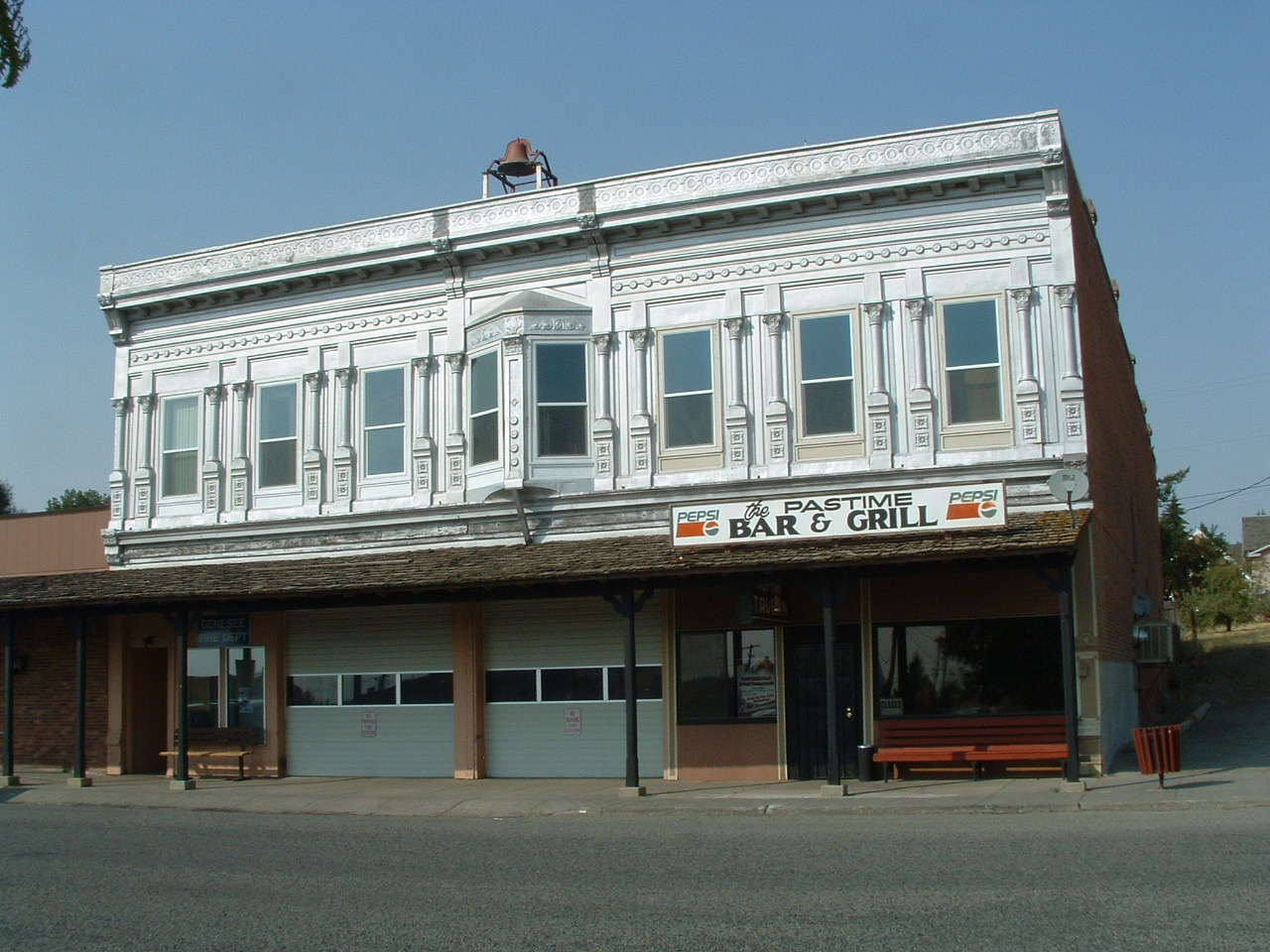
- Vollmer Building

- Location of Genesee in Latah County, Idaho.
- Coordinates: 46°33′06″N 116°55′42″W
- Country: United States
- State: Idaho
- County: Latah

Area
  - Total: 0.61 sq mi (1.59 km^{2})
  - Land: 0.61 sq mi (1.59 km^{2})
  - Water: 0 sq mi (0.00 km^{2})
- Elevation: 2,730 ft (830 m)

Population (2020)
  - Total: 1,030
  - Density: 1,572.0/sq mi (606.96/km^{2})
- Time zone: UTC-8 (Pacific (PST))
  - Summer (DST): UTC-7 (PDT)
- ZIP code: 83832
- Area code: 208
- FIPS code: 16-30160
- GNIS feature ID: 2410580
- Website: www.cityofgenesee.com

Historical population
Census	Pop.	Note	%±
1890	282		—
1900	731		159.2%
1910	742		1.5%
1920	676		−8.9%
1930	555		−17.9%
1940	678		22.2%
1950	552		−18.6%
1960	535		−3.1%
1970	619		15.7%
1980	791		27.8%
1990	725		−8.3%
2000	946		30.5%
2010	955		1.0%
2019 (est.)	965		1.0%
U.S. Decennial Census

Genesee is a city in Latah County, Idaho, United States. As of the 2020 census, Genesee had a population of 1,030. The city was named for the Genesee region of western New York, although it may also be a modification of the biblical Genesis.

The first area of permanent settlement in the county, it was incorporated 137 years ago on October 23, 1889. It is known for its grain production. The town is on the edge of Latah County and many of the rural residents live in Nez Perce county. There is one school in the town, a consolidated K-12 school within the Genesee School District.

== Geography ==
Genesee is located in the Palouse region, it is approximately 14 miles (23 km) south of Moscow, about halfway to Lewiston. The city center is just east of US-95, and just north of the Nez Perce County line in Sections 13 and 14 of Township 37 North, Range 5 West.

According to the United States Census Bureau, the city has a total area of 0.66 square miles (1.71 km^{2}), all of it land.

== Demographics ==
=== 2020 census ===
As of the 2020 census, Genesee had a population of 1,030. The median age was 34.9 years. 30.2% of residents were under the age of 18 and 13.5% of residents were 65 years of age or older. For every 100 females there were 96.2 males, and for every 100 females age 18 and over there were 95.9 males age 18 and over.

0.0% of residents lived in urban areas, while 100.0% lived in rural areas.

There were 374 households in Genesee, of which 42.2% had children under the age of 18 living in them. Of all households, 63.9% were married-couple households, 13.4% were households with a male householder and no spouse or partner present, and 17.6% were households with a female householder and no spouse or partner present. About 17.9% of all households were made up of individuals and 10.4% had someone living alone who was 65 years of age or older.

There were 399 housing units, of which 6.3% were vacant. The homeowner vacancy rate was 1.0% and the rental vacancy rate was 11.3%.

Racial composition as of the 2020 census
Race	Number	Percent
White	951	92.3%
Black or African American	0	0.0%
American Indian and Alaska Native	12	1.2%
Asian	2	0.2%
Native Hawaiian and Other Pacific Islander	1	0.1%
Some other race	5	0.5%
Two or more races	59	5.7%
Hispanic or Latino (of any race)	34	3.3%

=== 2010 census ===
As of the census of 2010, there were 955 people, 370 households, and 261 families residing in the city. The population density was 1,447.0 inhabitants per square mile (558.7/km^{2}). There were 400 housing units at an average density of 606.1 per square mile (234.0/km^{2}). The racial makeup of the city was 96.1% White, 0.2% Native American, 0.7% Asian, 0.2% from other races, and 2.7% from two or more races. Hispanic or Latino of any race were 1.0% of the population.

There were 370 households, of which 35.1% had children under the age of 18 living with them, 60.8% were married couples living together, 7.0% had a female householder with no husband present, 2.7% had a male householder with no wife present, and 29.5% were non-families. 23.8% of all households were made up of individuals, and 7.6% had someone living alone who was 65 years of age or older. The average household size was 2.58 and the average family size was 3.09.

The median age in the city was 37.5 years. 28.4% of residents were under the age of 18; 4.5% were between the ages of 18 and 24; 29.3% were from 25 to 44; 28% were from 45 to 64; and 9.7% were 65 years of age or older. The gender makeup of the city was 49.5% male and 50.5% female.

=== 2000 census ===
As of the census of 2000, there were 946 people, 355 households, and 275 families residing in the city. The population density was 1,456.6 inhabitants per square mile (562.4/km^{2}). There were 378 housing units at an average density of 582.0 per square mile (224.7/km^{2}). The racial makeup of the city was 96.83% White, 0.11% African American, 0.85% Native American, 0.21% Asian, 0.21% from other races, and 1.80% from two or more races. Hispanic or Latino of any race were 1.06% of the population.

There were 355 households, out of which 41.4% had children under the age of 18 living with them, 67.6% were married couples living together, 6.8% had a female householder with no husband present, and 22.5% were non-families. 18.3% of all households were made up of individuals, and 5.1% had someone living alone who was 65 years of age or older. The average household size was 2.66 and the average family size was 3.04.

In the city, the population was spread out, with 30.5% under the age of 18, 4.5% from 18 to 24, 33.5% from 25 to 44, 23.8% from 45 to 64, and 7.6% who were 65 years of age or older. The median age was 34 years. For every 100 females, there were 104.3 males. For every 100 females age 18 and over, there were 102.8 males.

The median income for a household in the city was $42,167, and the median income for a family was $47,794. Males had a median income of $32,500 versus $25,865 for females. The per capita income for the city was $19,576. About 4.4% of families and 6.2% of the population were below the poverty line, including 3.8% of those under age 18 and 14.1% of those age 65 or over.

== In popular culture ==
Several scenes from the 1991 movie Talent for the Game were filmed in Genesee in the summer of 1990. The movie contains cameos from Genesee locals.

== See also ==
- Genesee Exchange Bank
