= I.O.O.F. Hall (Challis, Idaho) =

- U.S. National Register of Historic Places
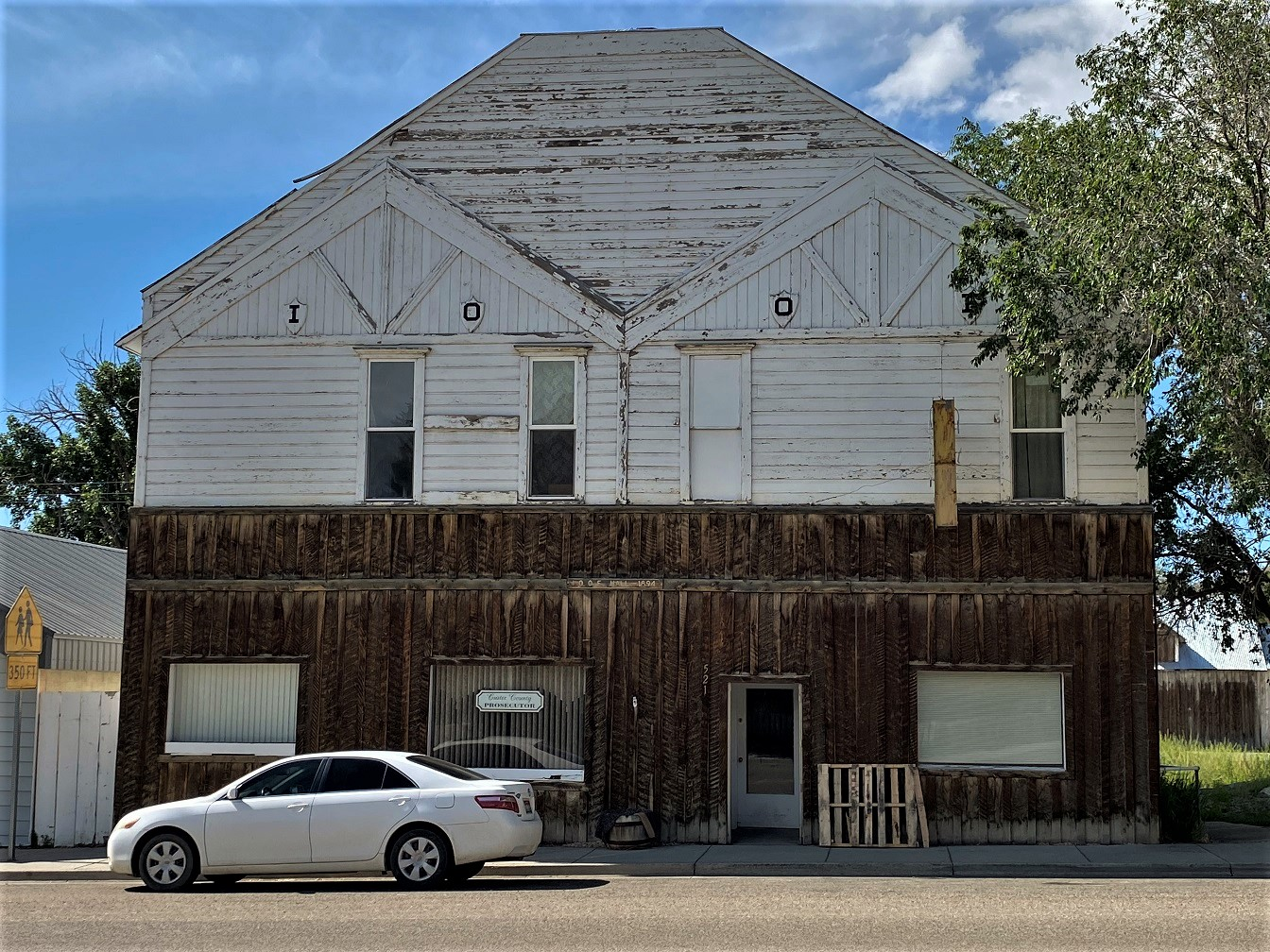
- Building in 2023

- Location within Idaho Location within the United States
- Location: 521 Main Ave. Challis, Idaho
- Coordinates: 44°30′17″N 114°13′59″W
- Area: less than one acre
- Architectural style: Queen Anne
- MPS: Challis MRA
- NRHP reference No.: 80001312
- Added to NRHP: December 3, 1980

The I.O.O.F. Hall is an Independent Order of Odd Fellows building located on Main Avenue in Challis, Idaho. The building was constructed in two sections; the first was built prior to 1894, while the second was added in 1896. The front facade features two raised gables with decorative Queen Anne woodwork; both gables were connected by a larger gable in 1930. The Odd Fellows were a significant social group in Challis' early history, as almost all of the town's founders were members of the organization. The hall was used for nearly every large community event in Challis during the early 1900s, including dances, public exhibitions, and even the meetings of other fraternal organizations.

The building was listed on the National Register of Historic Places on December 3, 1980.
