= Mount Vernon Commercial District =

- U.S. National Register of Historic Places
- U.S. Historic district
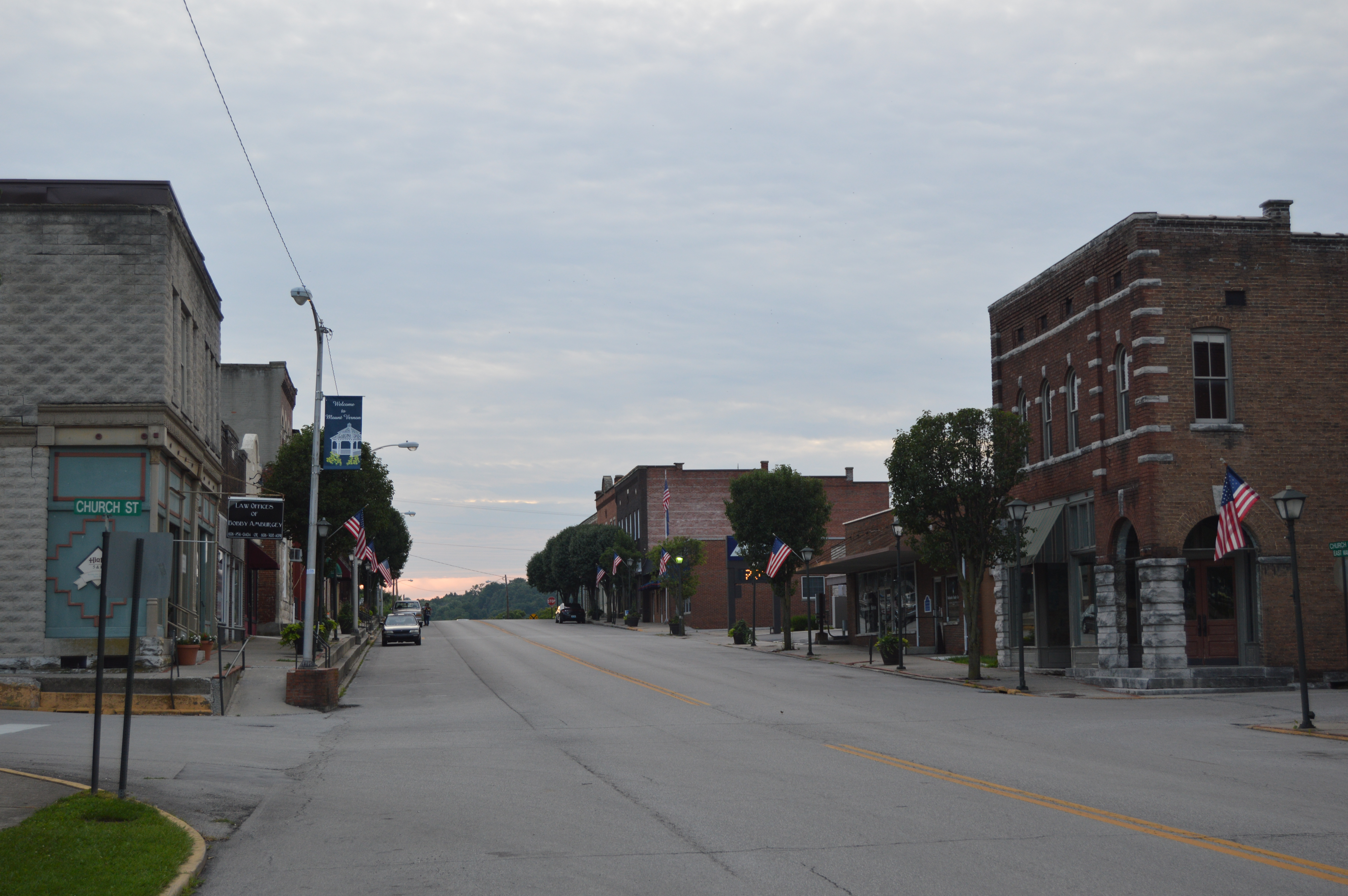
- Location: Main St. from Church to Richmond Sts., Mount Vernon, Kentucky
- Coordinates: 37.35333°N 84.3394°W
- Area: 5 acres (2.0 ha)
- Built: 1890
- Architect: George L. Mesker & Co.
- Architectural style: Romanesque
- NRHP reference No.: 83003815
- Added to NRHP: November 10, 1983

The Mount Vernon Commercial District in Mount Vernon, Kentucky is a 5 acres (2.0 ha) historic district which was listed on the National Register of Historic Places in 1983. It runs along Main St. from Church to Richmond Sts. and included 22 contributing buildings.

It was deemed "significant for its historical association with the commercial development of the town, as well as the development of Mt. Vernon as the major commercial and cultural center in Rockcastle County. Representing the core of the business section of Mt. Vernon, the commercial district comprises a noteworthy concentration of well-preserved late nineteenth and early twentieth century commercial architecture."
