= Mackay Episcopal Church =

Historic church in Idaho, United States

- U.S. National Register of Historic Places
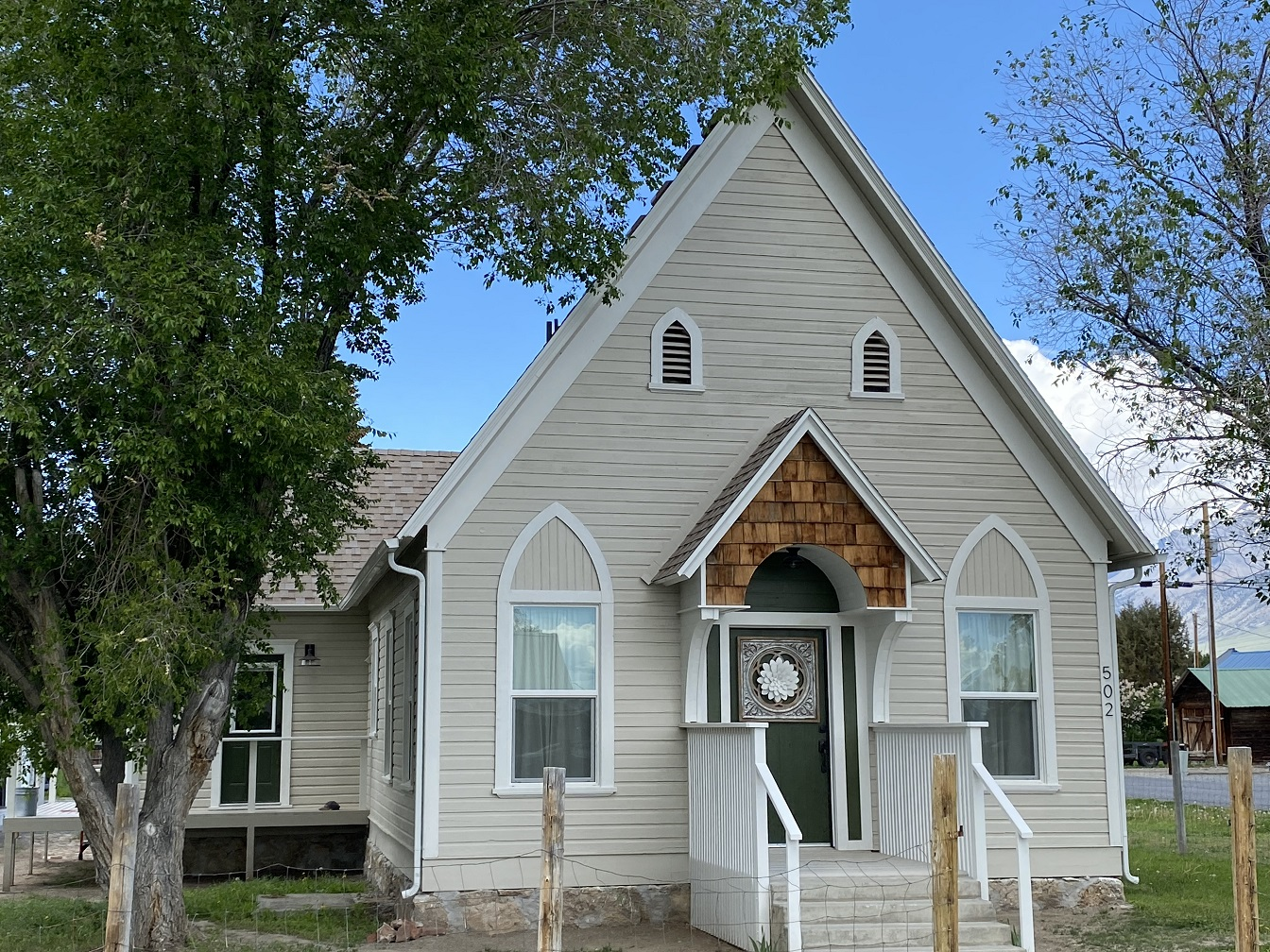
- The former church in 2023.

- Location within Idaho Location within the United States
- Location: Park Ave. and College; Mackay, Idaho
- Coordinates: 43°54′40″N 113°36′47″W
- Area: less than one acre
- Built: 1902
- Architect: John E. Tourtellotte & Company
- MPS: Tourtellotte and Hummel Architecture TR
- NRHP reference No.: 82000336
- Added to NRHP: November 17, 1982

The Mackay Episcopal Church, located at Park Ave. and College in Mackay, Idaho, was built in 1902. It was listed on the National Register of Historic Places in 1982.

It was an Episcopal church.

It was designed by architects John E. Tourtellotte & Company.

It is a one-story frame building, which is rectangular except for an outset gabled vestry at the left rear. It has a square belfry and it has shiplap siding.

A contemporary church, the Mackay Methodist Episcopal Church, was built in 1901 and is also NRHP-listed.
