= Challis, Idaho =

- City
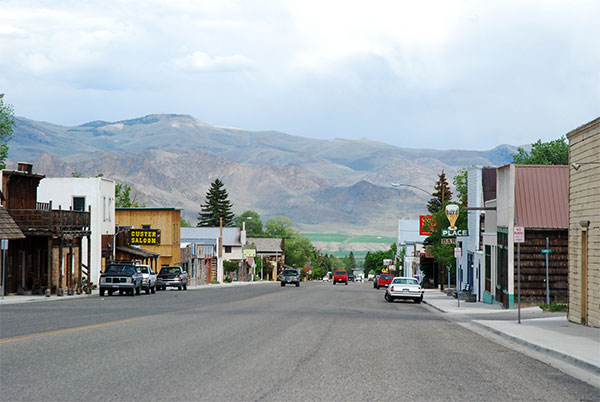
- Main Street in Challis, May 2007

- Location of Challis in Custer County, Idaho.

- Location in the United States Challis (the United States)
- Coordinates: 44°30′12″N 114°13′47″W
- Country: United States
- State: Idaho
- County: Custer

Area
  - Total: 1.95 sq mi (5.04 km^{2})
  - Land: 1.92 sq mi (4.97 km^{2})
  - Water: 0.027 sq mi (0.07 km^{2})
- Elevation: 5,214 ft (1,589 m)

Population (2020)
  - Total: 902
  - Estimate (2023): 924
  - Density: 568.4/sq mi (219.47/km^{2})
- Time zone: UTC-7 (Mountain (MST))
  - Summer (DST): UTC-6 (MDT)
- ZIP code: 83226
- Area code: 208
- FIPS code: 16-13780
- GNIS feature ID: 2409432
- Website: cityofchallis.com

Challis is the largest city in Custer County, Idaho, United States. It is the county seat and its population was 1,081 at the 2010 census. The 2020 census showed 902 residents, a 16.6% drop. And as of 2023, the population increased to 924.

== History ==
Challis was founded in 1878 and named for A.P. Challis, who was a surveyor when the townsite was laid out. Challis post office was established in 1878.

Twin Peaks Sports, the I.O.O.F. Hall, and a number of other buildings in Challis are individually listed on the National Register of Historic Places, most as a result of an Idaho State Historical Society study of historical resources in the town.

== Highways ==
- - US 93 - to Salmon (north) and Mackay (south)
- SH-75 - to Stanley (southwest)

The Salmon River Scenic Byway uses both highways, from Stanley to Salmon. The junction with Highway 75 is south of Challis.

== 1983 earthquake ==
On Friday, October 28, 1983, the Borah Peak earthquake occurred at 8:06 am MDT. The shock measured 6.9 on the moment magnitude scale and had a maximum Mercalli intensity of IX (Violent). The Challis-Mackay region experienced rather thorough damage, with 11 commercial buildings and 39 homes with major damage; while another 200 houses were damaged, minor to moderately. Mackay in particular, about 50 miles (80 km) southeast of Challis, experienced the most severe damage. Most of the city's large buildings on its Main Street were damaged, to some extent; eight of these buildings were deemed condemned and closed down. Most of these buildings were built from materials such as brick, concrete block, and stone, each varying. The two fatalities of the earthquake were in Challis; a store front fell on two children walking to school.

== 2020 earthquake ==
On Tuesday, March 31, 2020, at 5:52 pm MST, an earthquake measuring 6.5 on the moment magnitude scale occurred, centered 45 miles (72 km) west of Challis. This was the second strongest earthquake in the state of Idaho ever recorded.

== Geography and climate ==
According to the United States Census Bureau, the city has a total area of 1.88 square miles (4.87 km^{2}), of which, 1.85 square miles (4.79 km^{2}) is land and 0.03 square miles (0.08 km^{2}) is water.

Challis experiences a semi-arid climate (Köppen climate classification BSk) with cold winters, hot summers, and low precipitation throughout the year.

Climate data for Challis, Idaho (Challis Airport), 1991–2020 normals, extremes 1895–present
Month	Jan	Feb	Mar	Apr	May	Jun	Jul	Aug	Sep	Oct	Nov	Dec	Year
Record high °F (°C)	60 (16)	65 (18)	74 (23)	87 (31)	96 (36)	100 (38)	103 (39)	103 (39)	99 (37)	89 (32)	75 (24)	63 (17)	103 (39)
Mean maximum °F (°C)	45.0 (7.2)	50.9 (10.5)	64.7 (18.2)	74.1 (23.4)	83.9 (28.8)	92.3 (33.5)	97.6 (36.4)	95.3 (35.2)	88.7 (31.5)	77.0 (25.0)	59.5 (15.3)	46.9 (8.3)	97.2 (36.2)
Mean daily maximum °F (°C)	29.2 (−1.6)	36.7 (2.6)	49.2 (9.6)	56.8 (13.8)	66.8 (19.3)	75.5 (24.2)	86.9 (30.5)	84.9 (29.4)	74.5 (23.6)	58.5 (14.7)	40.5 (4.7)	28.8 (−1.8)	57.4 (14.1)
Daily mean °F (°C)	20.0 (−6.7)	26.8 (−2.9)	37.3 (2.9)	44.0 (6.7)	53.4 (11.9)	60.9 (16.1)	69.3 (20.7)	67.4 (19.7)	58.2 (14.6)	45.0 (7.2)	30.5 (−0.8)	19.8 (−6.8)	44.4 (6.9)
Mean daily minimum °F (°C)	10.7 (−11.8)	17.0 (−8.3)	25.5 (−3.6)	31.2 (−0.4)	40.0 (4.4)	46.3 (7.9)	51.7 (10.9)	49.9 (9.9)	42.0 (5.6)	31.6 (−0.2)	20.6 (−6.3)	10.8 (−11.8)	31.4 (−0.3)
Mean minimum °F (°C)	−10.4 (−23.6)	−2.5 (−19.2)	10.0 (−12.2)	18.2 (−7.7)	25.8 (−3.4)	33.6 (0.9)	41.6 (5.3)	39.4 (4.1)	29.3 (−1.5)	16.2 (−8.8)	2.8 (−16.2)	−8.3 (−22.4)	−15.1 (−26.2)
Record low °F (°C)	−33 (−36)	−31 (−35)	−16 (−27)	3 (−16)	15 (−9)	24 (−4)	31 (−1)	20 (−7)	17 (−8)	−4 (−20)	−17 (−27)	−34 (−37)	−34 (−37)
Average precipitation inches (mm)	0.41 (10)	0.36 (9.1)	0.46 (12)	0.52 (13)	0.93 (24)	0.93 (24)	0.42 (11)	0.45 (11)	0.85 (22)	0.56 (14)	0.52 (13)	0.52 (13)	6.93 (176.1)
Average snowfall inches (cm)	4.6 (12)	3.0 (7.6)	2.3 (5.8)	0.7 (1.8)	0.1 (0.25)	0.0 (0.0)	0.0 (0.0)	0.0 (0.0)	0.0 (0.0)	0.3 (0.76)	2.5 (6.4)	4.0 (10)	17.5 (44.61)
Average precipitation days (≥ 0.01 in)	6.4	5.4	6.8	6.8	8.9	7.6	4.6	5.3	4.6	5.2	6.4	7.1	75.1
Average snowy days (≥ 0.1 in)	3.3	2.2	1.5	0.4	0.1	0.0	0.0	0.0	0.0	0.2	1.8	3.1	12.6
Source 1: NOAA
Source 2: National Weather Service (average snowfall/snow days 1895–1996)

== Demographics ==
Historical population
Census	Pop.	Note	%±
1880	614		—
1890	356		−42.0%
1910	338		—
1920	484		43.2%
1930	418		−13.6%
1940	620		48.3%
1950	728		17.4%
1960	732		0.5%
1970	784		7.1%
1980	758		−3.3%
1990	1,073		41.6%
2000	909		−15.3%
2010	1,081		18.9%
2020	902		−16.6%
U.S. Decennial Census

=== 2020 census ===
At the 2020 census, there were 897 people, 402 households, and 234 families living in the city. The population density was approximately 485.4 inhabitants per square mile (187.4/km^{2}). There were 529 housing units at an average density of 286 per square mile (110.4/km^{2}). The racial makeup of the city was 91.9% White, 1% Native American, 0.3% Asian, 0.4% African American, 1.6% from other races, and 4.8% from two or more races. 6.2% of the population identified as Hispanic or Latino of any race.

Of the 402 households, 24.9% had children under the age of 18 living with them, 46.5% were married couples living together, 6.7% had a female householder with no husband present, 5.2% had a male householder with no wife present, and 41.8% were non-families. 36.6% of all households were made up of individuals, and 15.7% had someone living alone who was 65 years of age or older. The average household size was 2.12, and the average family size was 2.76.

The median age in Challis was 45.5 years. 20.4% of residents were under the age of 18, 4.8% were between 18 and 24, 21.7% were aged 25 to 44, 33.3% were aged 45 to 64, and 19.8% were 65 or older. The gender makeup of the city was approximately 49.3% male and 50.7% female.

=== 2010 census ===
At the 2010 census there were 1,081 people, 502 households, and 277 families living in the city. The population density was 584.3 inhabitants per square mile (225.6/km^{2}). There were 598 housing units at an average density of 323.2 per square mile (124.8/km^{2}). The racial makeup of the city was 93.6% White, 0.1% African American, 0.8% Native American, 0.3% Asian, 3.5% from other races, and 1.7% from two or more races. Hispanic or Latino of any race were 7.2%.

Of the 502 households 26.7% had children under the age of 18 living with them, 43.4% were married couples living together, 7.2% had a female householder with no husband present, 4.6% had a male householder with no wife present, and 44.8% were non-families. 39.0% of households were one person and 15.6% were one person aged 65 or older. The average household size was 2.14 and the average family size was 2.84.

The median age was 42 years. 21.3% of residents were under the age of 18; 6.7% were between the ages of 18 and 24; 26.3% were from 25 to 44; 28.5% were from 45 to 64; and 17.2% were 65 or older. The gender makeup of the city was 55.0% male and 45.0% female.

=== 2000 census ===
At the 2000 census there were 909 people, 410 households, and 248 families living in the city. The population density was 510.8 inhabitants per square mile (197.2/km^{2}). There were 525 housing units at an average density of 295.0 per square mile (113.9/km^{2}). The racial makeup of the city was 97.14% White, 0.88% Native American, 1.21% from other races, and 0.77% from two or more races. Hispanic or Latino of any race were 3.85%.

Of the 410 households 29.0% had children under the age of 18 living with them, 52.4% were married couples living together, 5.1% had a female householder with no husband present, and 39.3% were non-families. 35.6% of households were one person and 17.6% were one person aged 65 or older. The average household size was 2.21 and the average family size was 2.90.

The age distribution was 25.0% under the age of 18, 4.7% from 18 to 24, 26.0% from 25 to 44, 24.9% from 45 to 64, and 19.5% 65 or older. The median age was 42 years. For every 100 females, there were 98.0 males. For every 100 females age 18 and over, there were 94.3 males.

The median household income was $29,904 and the median family income was $39,444. Males had a median income of $38,250 versus $21,964 for females. The per capita income for the city was $15,803. About 8.5% of families and 12.7% of the population were below the poverty line, including 8.2% of those under age 18 and 18.5% of those age 65 or over.

== Notable people ==
- Lawrence Henry Chamberlain (1906–1989), dean of Columbia College and vice president of Columbia University
