= Idaho caucus =

Idaho caucus could refer to:

- Idaho Democratic caucuses, 2008
- Idaho Republican primary, 2008
- Idaho Republican caucuses, 2012
- Idaho Democratic caucuses, 2016
