= 2008 United States presidential election in Idaho =

- November 4, 2008

Nominee	John McCain	Barack Obama
Party	Republican	Democratic
Home state	Arizona	Illinois
Running mate	Sarah Palin	Joe Biden
Electoral vote	4	0
Popular vote	403,012	236,440
Percentage	61.21%	35.91%

McCain
40–50%
50–60%
60–70%
70–80%
80–90%
90–100%
Obama
40–50%
50–60%
60–70%
70–80%
80–90%
Baldwin
60–70%
70–80%
President before election
George W. Bush
Republican
Elected President
Barack Obama
Democratic

The 2008 United States presidential election in Idaho took place on November 4, 2008, and was part of the 2008 United States presidential election. Voters chose four representatives, or electors to the Electoral College, who voted for president and vice president.

Idaho was won by Republican nominee John McCain by a 25.3% margin of victory. Prior to the election, all 17 major news organizations considered this a state McCain would win, or a red state. Polling in the state gave a sizable lead to McCain over Democrat Barack Obama, with most polling predicting a McCain win of at least 30 percentage points. Despite his landslide defeat in the state, Obama over-performed his polls and greatly improved on Kerry's performance four years earlier. Idaho has not gone Democratic for President since Lyndon B. Johnson narrowly won it in 1964.

== Primaries ==
- 2008 Idaho Democratic presidential caucuses
- 2008 Idaho Republican presidential primary

== Campaign ==
=== Predictions ===
There were 16 news organizations who made state-by-state predictions of the election. Here are their last predictions before election day:

Source	Ranking
D.C. Political Report	Likely R
Cook Political Report	Solid R
The Takeaway	Solid R
Electoral-vote.com	Solid R
Washington Post	Solid R
Politico	Solid R
RealClearPolitics	Solid R
FiveThirtyEight	Solid R
CQ Politics	Solid R
The New York Times	Solid R
CNN	Safe R
NPR	Solid R
MSNBC	Solid R
Fox News	Likely R
Associated Press	Likely R
Rasmussen Reports	Safe R

=== Polling ===
McCain won every pre-election poll with a double-digit margin and with at least 52 percent of the vote. The final three poll average gave the Republican 66 percent to Obama's 29 percent.

=== Fundraising ===
Obama raised $874,523. McCain raised $441,338.

=== Advertising and visits ===
Obama spent $268. McCain spent $434. Neither campaign visited the state.

== Analysis ==
With a substantial Mormon population, Idaho is one of the most reliably GOP bastions in the country. Although Barack Obama became the first Democratic presidential candidate since Michael Dukakis in 1988 to eclipse 35 percent of the vote in solidly red state Idaho, the state was still won handily by John McCain by a margin of approximately 25.34 percent. McCain carried 41 of the state's 44 counties, with Obama winning Blaine County, home to Sun Valley and several other prime ski resorts; Latah County, home to the college town of Moscow, and Teton County, a highly affluent suburb of Teton County, Wyoming, and the last until Joe Biden won it in 2020 United States presidential election in Idaho. Obama was the first Democrat to carry Teton County since Harry S. Truman in 1948. He also narrowed the Republican margins of victory in Ada County, and in the state capital and city of Boise to single digits. McCain's victory in Idaho, however, was less than that of George W. Bush who carried the state with 68.38 percent of the vote in 2004, a 12.78-point swing to the Democrats in Idaho.

With 61.21 percent of the popular vote, Idaho proved to be McCain's fourth strongest state in 2008 election after Oklahoma, Wyoming and Utah.

Obama became the first Democrat to win the White House without carrying Nez Perce County since Grover Cleveland in 1892.

During the same election, Republicans held onto the open U.S. Senate seat vacated by Republican Larry Craig who reluctantly retired after it was revealed that he had solicited a man for sex in the men's restroom at an airport in Minneapolis. Then-Lieutenant Governor Jim Risch, a Republican, was elected with 57.65% of the vote over Democrat Larry LaRocco who received 34.11%. A pro-life independent candidate received 5.35 point while Libertarian Kent Marmon received 1.54% and Rex Rammell, a far right-wing candidate who also ran as an independent, received 1.34%.

At the state level, Republicans expanded their supermajority status in the Idaho state legislature as they picked up one seat in the Idaho House of Representatives.

== Results ==
2008 United States presidential election in Idaho
Party	Candidate	Running mate	Votes	Percentage	Electoral votes
Republican	John McCain	Sarah Palin	403,012	61.21%	4
Democratic	Barack Obama	Joe Biden	236,440	35.91%	0
Independent	Ralph Nader	Matt Gonzalez	7,175	1.09%	0
Constitution	Chuck Baldwin	Darrell Castle	4,747	0.72%	0
Libertarian	Bob Barr	Wayne Allyn Root	3,658	0.56%	0
American Independent (Write-in)	Alan Keyes (Write-in)	Brian Rohrbough	40 (Note: None of these designated write-in candidate votes were separated by county.)	0.01%	0
Green (Write-in)	Cynthia McKinney (Write-in)	Rosa Clemente	39	0.01%	0
Socialist (Write-in)	Brian Moore (Write-in)	Stewart Alexander	3	0.00%	0
Write-ins			8	0.00%	0
Totals			658,454	100.00%	4
Voter turnout (Voting age population)					60.1%

=== By county ===
County	John McCain Republican		Barack Obama Democratic		Various candidates Other parties		Margin		Total votes cast
County	#	%	#	%	#	%	#	%	Total votes cast
Ada	93,328	51.63%	82,236	45.49%	5,196	2.88%	11,092	6.14%	180,760
Adams	1,517	65.39%	728	31.38%	75	3.23%	789	34.01%	2,320
Bannock	19,356	54.62%	14,792	41.74%	1,289	3.64%	4,564	12.88%	35,437
Bear Lake	2,377	80.77%	502	17.06%	64	2.17%	1,875	63.71%	2,943
Benewah	2,646	63.54%	1,407	33.79%	111	2.67%	1,239	29.75%	4,164
Bingham	12,230	71.29%	4,424	25.79%	502	2.92%	7,806	45.50%	17,156
Blaine	3,439	32.53%	6,947	65.71%	187	1.76%	-3,508	-33.18%	10,573
Boise	2,433	64.48%	1,240	32.87%	100	2.65%	1,193	31.61%	3,773
Bonner	11,145	57.01%	7,840	40.10%	565	2.89%	3,305	16.91%	19,550
Bonneville	29,334	70.34%	11,417	27.38%	952	2.28%	17,917	42.96%	41,703
Boundary	3,078	65.02%	1,484	31.35%	172	3.63%	1,594	33.67%	4,734
Butte	1,056	74.89%	318	22.55%	36	2.56%	738	52.34%	1,406
Camas	422	68.28%	187	30.26%	9	1.46%	235	38.02%	618
Canyon	42,752	66.07%	20,147	31.14%	1,807	2.79%	22,605	34.93%	64,706
Caribou	2,656	80.44%	553	16.75%	93	2.81%	2,103	63.69%	3,302
Cassia	6,309	79.93%	1,332	16.88%	252	3.19%	4,977	63.05%	7,893
Clark	305	81.33%	64	17.07%	6	1.60%	241	64.26%	375
Clearwater	2,569	65.77%	1,211	31.00%	126	3.23%	1,358	34.77%	3,906
Custer	1,694	71.99%	611	25.97%	48	2.04%	1,083	46.02%	2,353
Elmore	5,665	66.76%	2,591	30.53%	230	2.71%	3,074	36.23%	8,486
Franklin	4,246	83.68%	600	11.82%	228	4.50%	3,646	71.86%	5,074
Fremont	4,700	79.92%	1,065	18.11%	116	1.97%	3,635	61.81%	5,881
Gem	5,585	70.27%	2,166	27.25%	197	2.48%	3,419	43.02%	7,948
Gooding	3,765	69.84%	1,489	27.62%	137	2.54%	2,276	42.22%	5,391
Idaho	5,895	71.79%	2,017	24.56%	300	3.65%	3,878	47.23%	8,212
Jefferson	8,540	81.79%	1,641	15.72%	260	2.49%	6,899	66.07%	10,441
Jerome	4,897	71.52%	1,794	26.20%	156	2.28%	3,103	45.32%	6,847
Kootenai	38,387	61.38%	22,120	35.37%	2,028	3.25%	16,267	26.01%	62,535
Latah	7,988	44.59%	9,195	51.32%	733	4.09%	-1,207	-6.73%	17,916
Lemhi	2,938	71.57%	1,061	25.85%	106	2.58%	1,877	45.72%	4,105
Lewis	1,275	70.68%	479	26.55%	50	2.77%	796	44.13%	1,804
Lincoln	1,232	65.88%	545	29.14%	93	4.98%	687	36.74%	1,870
Madison	11,131	85.24%	1,627	12.46%	300	2.30%	9,504	72.78%	13,058
Minidoka	5,087	73.83%	1,630	23.66%	173	2.51%	3,457	50.17%	6,890
Nez Perce	10,357	58.11%	7,123	39.97%	343	1.92%	3,234	18.14%	17,823
Oneida	1,724	79.74%	381	17.62%	57	2.64%	1,343	62.12%	2,162
Owyhee	3,024	74.52%	944	23.26%	90	2.22%	2,080	51.26%	4,058
Payette	5,988	68.88%	2,415	27.78%	290	3.34%	3,573	41.10%	8,693
Power	1,754	61.72%	1,027	36.14%	61	2.14%	727	25.58%	2,842
Shoshone	2,953	52.11%	2,521	44.49%	193	3.40%	432	7.62%	5,667
Teton	2,263	48.57%	2,302	49.41%	94	2.02%	-39	-0.84%	4,659
Twin Falls	19,032	66.52%	8,621	30.13%	960	3.35%	10,411	36.39%	28,613
Valley	2,772	52.33%	2,405	45.40%	120	2.27%	367	6.93%	5,297
Washington	3,168	70.31%	1,241	27.54%	97	2.15%	1,927	42.77%	4,506
Totals	403,012	61.21%	236,440	35.91%	19,002	2.88%	166,572	25.30%	658,454

Counties that flipped from Republican to Democratic

- Latah (largest city: Moscow)
- Teton (largest city: Victor)

=== By congressional district ===
John McCain solidly swept both Idaho's congressional districts, including one that elected a Democrat.

District	McCain	Obama	Representative
1st	61.82%	35.88%	Bill Sali (110th Congress)
1st	61.82%	35.88%	Walt Minnick (111th Congress)
2nd	61.19%	36.34%	Mike Simpson

== Electors ==
Technically the voters of Idaho cast their ballots for electors: representatives to the Electoral College. Idaho is allocated four electors because it has two congressional districts and two senators. All candidates who appear on the ballot or qualify to receive write-in votes must submit a list of four electors, who pledge to vote for their candidate and their running mate. Whoever wins a plurality of votes in the state is awarded all four electoral votes. Their chosen electors then vote for president and vice president. Although electors are pledged to their candidate and running mate, they are not obligated to vote for them. An elector who votes for someone other than their candidate is known as a faithless elector.

The electors of each state and the District of Columbia met on December 15, 2008, to cast their votes for president and vice president. The Electoral College itself never meets as one body. Instead the electors from each state and the District of Columbia met in their respective capitols.

The following were the members of the Electoral College from the state. All four were pledged to John McCain and Sarah Palin:

1. Darlene Bramon
2. Ben Doty
3. John Erickson
4. Melinda Smyser

== See also ==
- United States presidential elections in Idaho
- Presidency of Barack Obama
