= Keith Judd =

American politician

Keith Russell Judd
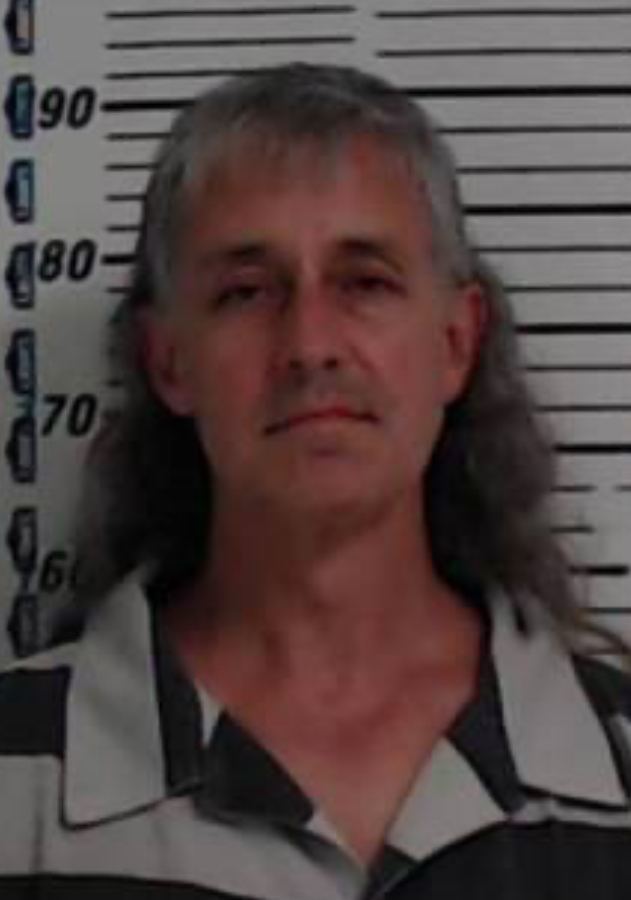
- Judd’s Mug shot, 2013
- Born: May 23, 1958 (age 68); Pasadena, California, U.S.
- Occupation: Perennial candidate
- Status: Supervised release
- Criminal charges: Threatened extortion
- Penalty: 210 months in federal prison

Keith Russell Judd (born May 23, 1958) is an American convicted criminal and perennial candidate for political office. His nicknames include "Dark Priest" and "Mtr. President". He claims to have run for president of the United States in every election since 1996. In the 2012 Democratic primary in West Virginia, Judd won 41% of the vote against incumbent Barack Obama, then the highest single-state vote share that any of Obama's primary opponents had achieved in 2012.

== Early life ==
Judd was born May 23, 1958, in Pasadena, California. He is married and has professed to be a Rasta-Christian. Judd has claimed to be a former member of the "Federation of Super Heroes."

He has claimed to have run in every United States presidential election since 1996. He ran for mayor of Albuquerque, New Mexico in 1993 and 1997 and for the Republican nomination for Governor of New Mexico in 1994.

As of November 1997, Judd was listed as a third-year business student at the University of New Mexico (UNM).

As of 1999, he claimed to be self-employed as a musician and bandleader and to suffer from bipolar disorder.

Outside of his political campaigns and his music career, Judd has also occupied his time with vexatious litigation. At least two of his appeals have been considered by the Supreme Court of the United States. In a per curiam opinion in 1999, the Court noted that he had filed a dozen frivolous petitions for certiorari and extraordinary writs in the federal courts in the span of a few years.

== Crime ==
In November 1992, Judd was arrested after threatening UNM administrators and student newspaper staff with guns and being questioned by the United States Secret Service related to the visit of a Vice Presidential candidate to the school. Judd was expelled from the school, banned from campus, had two guns confiscated, and was committed to the UNM Hospital's mental health facility.

In 1999, Judd was convicted of two counts of "mailing a threatening communication with intent to extort money or something of value" and sentenced to 210 months (17½ years) in federal prison. The conviction has been falsely connected to litigation involving UNM which was a civil rights complaint he initiated. His actual crime involved postcards that stated "Send the money back now, Keith Judd, Last Chance or Dead." and a package containing a semen-stained Playboy, a knife inside the magazine, a key chain, and his father's military discharge papers. He also sent letters to jurors after his trial. He has appealed his conviction no fewer than 36 times, but each appeal has been dismissed for various reasons.

Judd was released in June 2013 on a supervised release program. In October, his probation office sought a warrant for his arrest for violating the terms of his supervision. He was sentenced to 12 months in prison, with another 24 months of supervised release. He has since been released a second time under supervision.

== Presidential candidacies ==
As a perennial candidate, Judd has thrice run for president in the Democratic Party's primaries, in 2008, 2012 and 2016. Each time Judd has managed to qualify to be included on the ballot of at least one Democratic Party primary or caucus.

=== 2008 Democratic presidential primary campaign ===
In the 2008 presidential election he filed to run as a Democrat in 14 states but only appeared on the ballot in Idaho.

Judd finished third in the May 27, 2008, non-binding Idaho Democratic presidential preference primary with 1.7 percent of the vote, behind Barack Obama and Hillary Clinton. No delegates to the Democratic National Convention were at stake in the primary as Idaho's delegation was determined at the February 5 Democratic caucus, which Judd unsuccessfully contested.

Below is a table of Judd's performance in the primaries.

Primary results
Date	Contest	Votes	Place	Percent	Delegates	Source(s)
February 5	Idaho caucus	0	4th of 4	0.00	0	The Green Papers
Total		0		0.00	0	

=== 2012 Democratic presidential primary campaign ===
Map of second-place candidates in the 2012 Democratic presidential primaries Legend: Keith Russell Judd Ron Paul Darcy Richardson John Wolfe Jr. Randall Terry Uncommitted/other No second-place finisher No primary held/ no info available

Judd filed to run for president again in the 2012 general election. Running again for the Democratic nomination, Judd only qualified for ballot status in the West Virginia primary. On May 8, 2012, Judd won 41% of the vote against incumbent Barack Obama, a higher percentage of the vote in one state than any other primary opponent of Obama had hitherto achieved in 2012 (a figure later surpassed by John Wolfe, Jr.'s showing in the Arkansas primary). While this showing would normally have entitled Judd to delegates at the 2012 Democratic National Convention, state officials expressed some uncertainty as to whether Judd had completed the required formalities, such as filing a slate of delegates and completing paperwork. Judd, who did not qualify for any other primary ballots, contested the ballot count, alleging that ballot workers suppressed the actual total (which he said showed him in the lead) in an effort to cover up an Obama loss.

Below is a table of Judd's performance in the primaries.

Primary results
Date	Contest	Votes	Place	Percent	Delegates	Source(s)
March 1	West Virginia primary	73,137	2nd of 2	40.65	0	The Green Papers
Total		73,137	3rd	0.89	0	

=== 2016 Democratic presidential primary campaign ===
Map showing Judd's ballot access in the 2016 Democratic Primaries On ballot Not on ballot

Judd sent a handwritten note to the FEC announcing his 2016 presidential candidacy as a Democrat on August 16, 2014. He filed his official documents with the FEC in September 2015. As of January 1, 2016, Judd had been officially added to the ballot in the Louisiana, Missouri, New Hampshire, Oklahoma, and Texas Democratic Primaries. On January 12, 2016, Judd's paperwork was filed to be on the primary ballot in West Virginia.

Below is a table of the primaries Judd competed in, and his performance in them.

Primary results
Date	Contest	Votes	Place	Percent	Delegates	Source(s)
Feb 9	New Hampshire primary	44	12th of 28	0.02	0	The Green Papers
March 1	Texas primary	2,569	6th of 8	0.18	0	The Green Papers
March 1	Oklahoma primary	4,386	4th of 7	1.31	0	The Green Papers
March 5	Louisiana primary	1,357	7th of 10	0.44	0	The Green Papers
March 15	Missouri primary	288	8th of 9	0.05	0	The Green Papers
May 10	West Virginia primary	4,450	4th of 6	1.85	0	The Green Papers
June 7	California primary	5,506	6th of 7	0.16	0	The Green Papers
June 7	North Dakota caucus	0		0.00	0	The Green Papers
Total		20,305	7th	0.07	0	The Green Paper
