= 2012 West Virginia Democratic presidential primary =

- May 8, 2012

36 pledged delegates to the 2012 Democratic National Convention

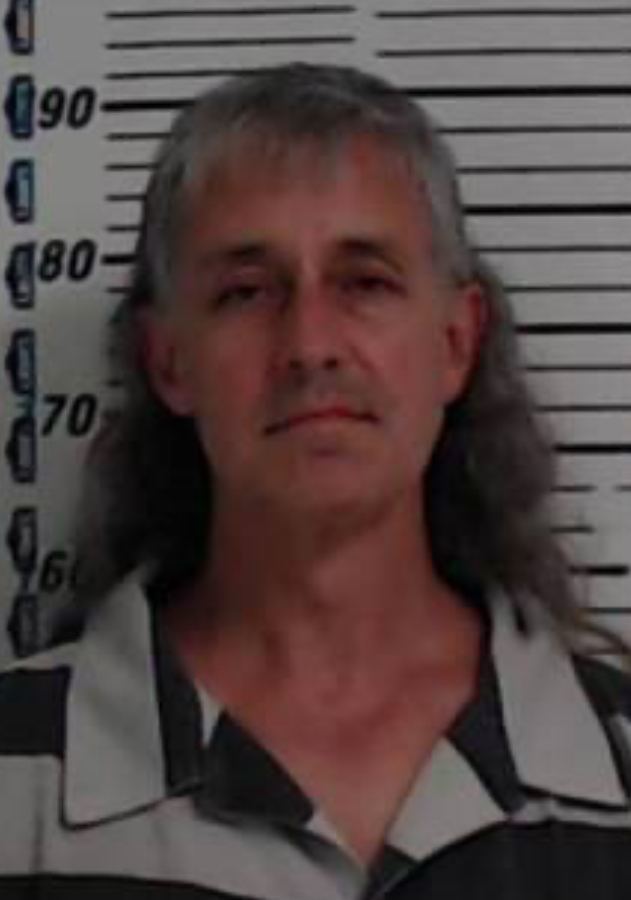
Candidate	Barack Obama	Keith Judd
Home state	Illinois	California
Delegate count	36 (21)	0 (15)
Popular vote	106,770	73,138
Percentage	59.3%	40.7%
- County results Obama: 50–55% 55–60% 60–65% 65–70% 70–75% 75–80% Judd: 50–55% 55–60% 60–65%

The 2012 West Virginia Democratic presidential primary was held on May 8, 2012 as part of the 2012 Democratic presidential primaries.

Incumbent president Barack Obama ran virtually unopposed for renomination, although several minor candidates challenged Obama in a handful of state contests, including West Virginia. Barack Obama won the primary against virtually unknown convicted felon and perennial candidate Keith Judd by a roughly 19-point margin, a relatively narrow victory that received national attention and was explained with Obama's general unpopularity in West Virginia.

== Procedure ==
West Virginia was given a 20% pledged delegate bonus due to the primary being held during Stage 3 of the primary season. In total, the state was allocated 47 delegates to the Democratic National Convention: 36 were allocated based on the results of the primary, with the other 11 being unpledged superdelegates.

In order to qualify for delegates, a candidate must receive at least 15% of the vote statewide or in at least one congressional district. 12 of West Virginia's delegates were allocated based on the statewide popular vote, consisting of eight at-large delegates and four pledged PLEOs (party leaders and elected officials). Each of West Virginia's three congressional districts were allotted eight pledged delegates.

== Results ==
Judd would have won 15 delegates for the Democratic National Convention but he had not registered any delegates before the primary election to fill the spots, and so all delegates went to Obama.

Vote summary of the 2012 West Virginia Democratic presidential primary
Candidate	Vote		Pledged delegates
Candidate	#	%	Pledged delegates
Barack Obama	106,770	59.35	36 (21)
Keith Russell Judd	73,138	40.65	0 (15)
Total valid votes	179,908	100%	36

=== Vote by county ===
County	Barack Obama		Keith Judd		Total votes cast
County	Votes	%	Votes	%	Total votes cast
Barbour	964	57.79%	704	42.21%	1,668
Berkeley	2,843	71.70%	1,122	28.30%	3,965
Boone	2,210	48.42%	2,354	51.58%	4,564
Braxton	1,357	56.31%	1,053	43.69%	2,410
Brooke	2,231	59.83%	1,498	40.17%	3,729
Cabell	5,049	70.10%	2,154	29.90%	7,203
Calhoun	531	53.53%	461	46.47%	992
Clay	739	47.96%	802	52.04%	1,541
Doddridge	169	57.68%	124	42.32%	293
Fayette	3,104	59.26%	2,134	40.74%	5,238
Gilmer	643	48.09%	694	51.91%	1,337
Grant	169	68.70%	77	31.30%	246
Greenbrier	2,615	60.06%	1,739	39.94%	4,354
Hampshire	924	53.50%	803	46.50%	1,727
Hancock	2,382	58.80%	1,669	41.20%	4,051
Hardy	915	42.13%	1,257	57.87%	2,172
Harrison	4,816	63.07%	2,820	36.93%	7,636
Jackson	1,921	68.24%	894	31.76%	2,815
Jefferson	2,506	77.68%	720	22.32%	3,226
Kanawha	12,360	71.94%	4,820	28.06%	17,180
Lewis	1,081	54.29%	910	45.71%	1,991
Lincoln	1,388	47.23%	1,551	52.77%	2,939
Logan	2,315	44.54%	2,883	55.46%	5,198
Marion	5,156	60.92%	3,307	39.08%	8,463
Marshall	2,362	59.48%	1,609	25.66%	3,971
Mason	1,731	64.45%	955	35.55%	2,686
McDowell	1,539	52.40%	1,398	47.60%	2,937
Mercer	2,494	50.26%	2,468	49.74%	4,962
Mineral	940	57.21%	703	42.79%	1,643
Mingo	1,974	39.76%	2,991	60.24%	4,965
Monongalia	4,608	68.24%	2,145	31.76%	6,753
Monroe	736	61.54%	460	38.46%	1,196
Morgan	637	75.12%	211	24.88%	848
Nicholas	1,820	52.30%	1,660	47.70%	3,480
Ohio	2,902	68.17%	1,355	31.83%	4,257
Pendleton	648	52.26%	592	47.74%	1,240
Pleasants	524	59.95%	350	40.05%	874
Pocahontas	874	57.54%	645	42.46%	1,519
Preston	1,108	56.91%	839	43.09%	1,947
Putnam	2,653	66.96%	1,309	33.04%	3,962
Raleigh	3,401	51.93%	3,148	48.07%	6,549
Randolph	2,105	50.71%	2,046	49.29%	4,151
Ritchie	273	56.76%	208	43.24%	481
Roane	903	72.53%	342	27.47%	1,245
Summers	1,011	55.46%	812	44.54%	1,823
Taylor	1,147	56.89%	869	43.11%	2,016
Tucker	561	47.50%	620	52.50%	1,181
Tyler	283	61.39%	178	38.61%	461
Upshur	994	66.67%	497	33.33%	1,491
Wayne	2,456	55.95%	1,934	44.05%	4,390
Webster	863	45.71%	1,025	54.29%	1,888
Wetzel	1,490	54.24%	1,257	45.76%	2,747
Wirt	385	51.68%	360	48.32%	745
Wood	3,868	64.14%	2,163	35.86%	6,031
Wyoming	1,092	43.15%	1,439	56.85%	2,531
Total	106,770	59.35%	73,138	40.65%	179,908
