= 2016 United States presidential election in Missouri =

- November 8, 2016
- Turnout: 66.56% (▲0.61 pp)

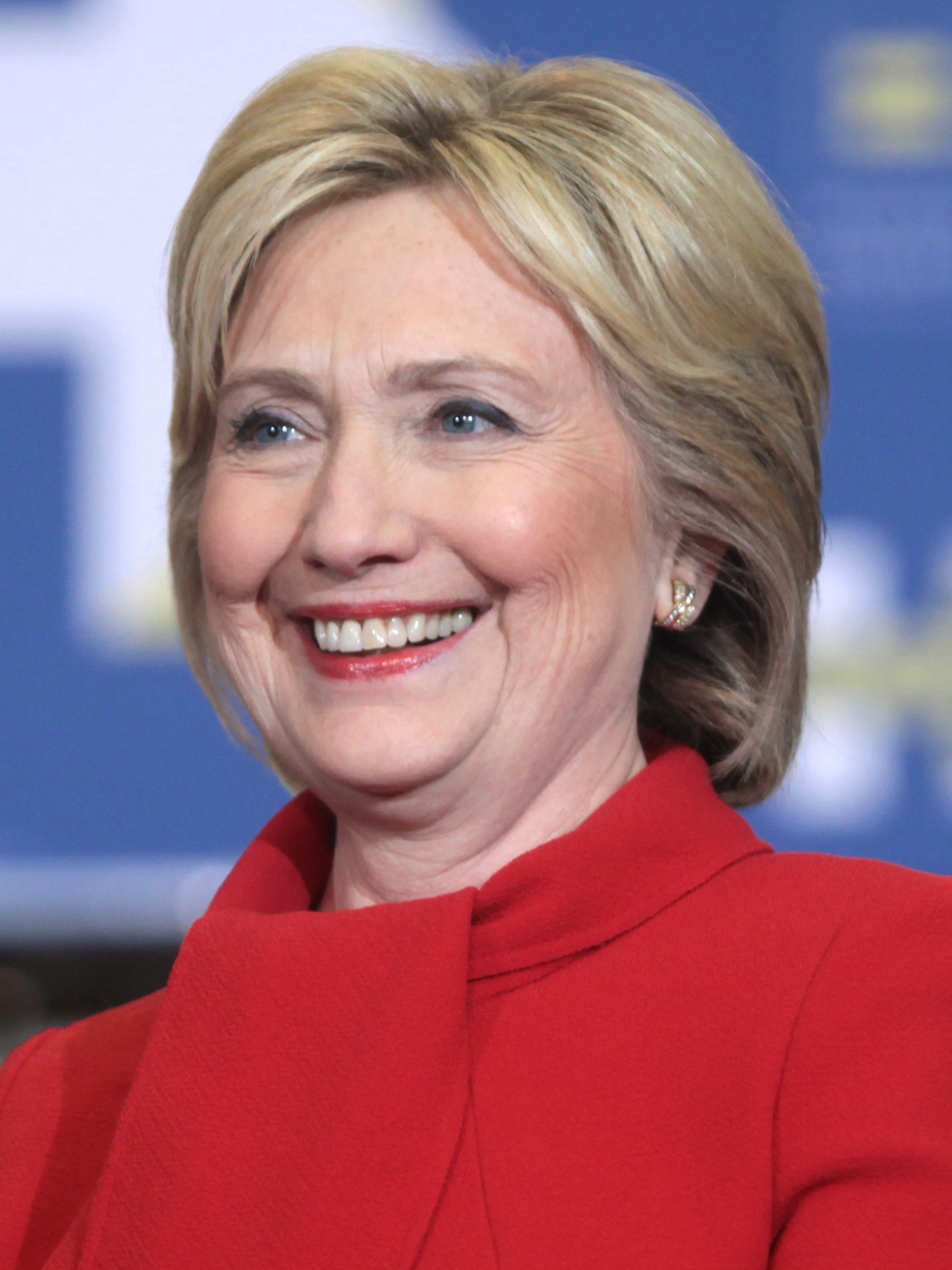
Nominee	Donald Trump	Hillary Clinton
Party	Republican	Democratic
Home state	New York	New York
Running mate	Mike Pence	Tim Kaine
Electoral vote	10	0
Popular vote	1,594,511	1,071,068
Percentage	56.38%	37.87%

Trump
40–50%
50–60%
60–70%
70–80%
80–90%
90–100%
Clinton
40–50%
50–60%
60–70%
70–80%
80–90%
90–100%
Tie/No Votes
President before election
Barack Obama
Democratic
Elected President
Donald Trump
Republican

Treemap of the popular vote by county

The 2016 United States presidential election in Missouri was held on Tuesday, November 8, 2016, as part of the 2016 United States presidential election in which all 50 states plus the District of Columbia participated. Missouri voters chose electors to represent them in the Electoral College via a popular vote, pitting the Republican Party's nominee, businessman Donald Trump, and running mate Indiana Governor Mike Pence against Democratic Party nominee, former Secretary of State Hillary Clinton, and her running mate Virginia Senator Tim Kaine. Missouri has 10 electoral votes in the Electoral College.

Trump carried the state with 56.4% of the vote, while Clinton received 37.9%. Trump's 18.5-point margin of victory in the state was almost double that of Mitt Romney's from 2012. Clinton carried only four jurisdictions: Boone County, home to Columbia and the University of Missouri; Jackson County, which includes most of Kansas City; St. Louis County; and St. Louis City. Clinton's vote share percentage was the lowest a Democratic presidential nominee obtained in the state since George McGovern's 37.7% in 1972, further cementing the state's drift towards the Republican Party and away from its long-held status as a bellwether state. Missouri was also one of eleven states that voted for Bill Clinton in 1992 and 1996 but were lost by Hillary Clinton in 2016.

Additionally, this was the first time since 1984 that Missouri voted by double digits for the Republican candidate, and the first time since 1992 that the state voted by double digits for either candidate.

== Primary elections ==
=== Democratic primary ===
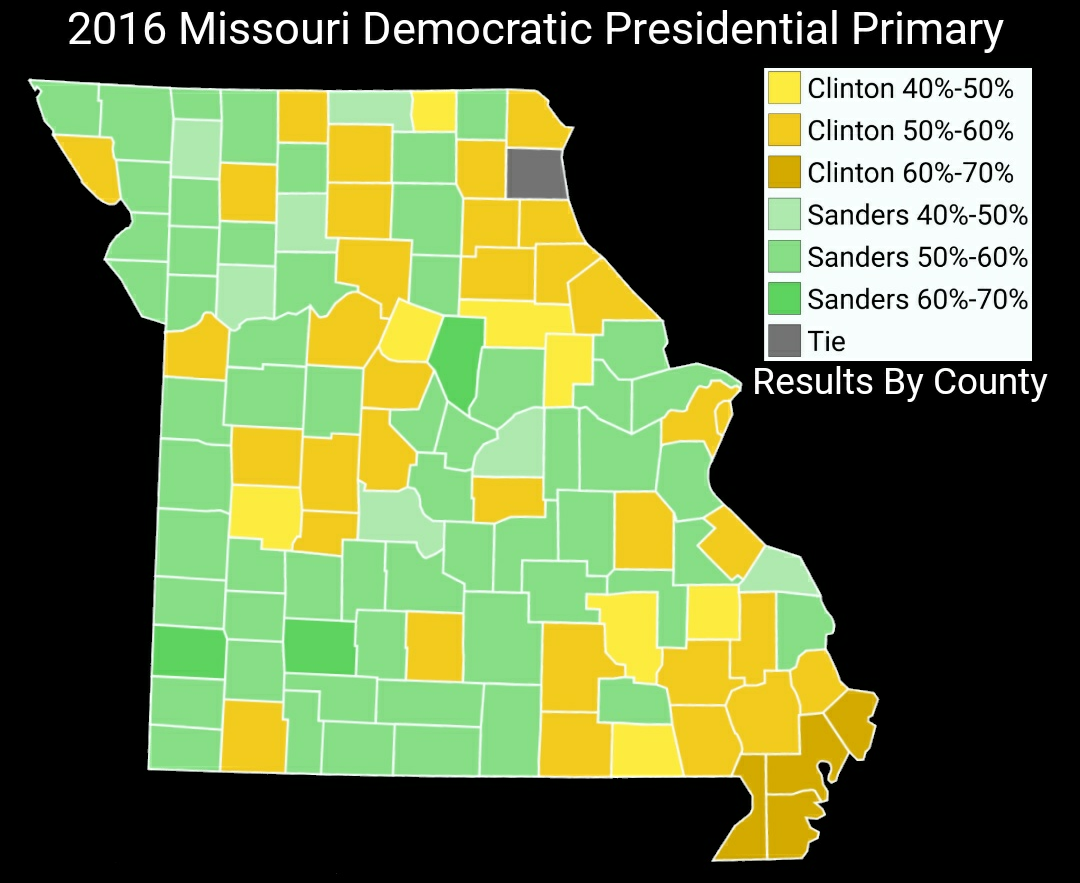
County results of the Missouri 2016 Democratic presidential primary Hillary Clinton Bernie Sanders

Nine candidates appeared on the Democratic presidential primary ballot:

- Jon Adams
- Hillary Clinton
- Rocky De La Fuente
- Henry Hewes
- Keith Judd
- Martin O'Malley (withdrawn)
- Bernie Sanders
- Willie L. Wilson
- John Wolfe Jr.

Missouri Democratic primary, March 15, 2016
Candidate	Popular vote		Estimated delegates		
Candidate	Count	Percentage	Pledged	Unpledged	Total
Hillary Clinton	310,600	49.61%	36	11	47
Bernie Sanders	309,073	49.37%	35	0	35
Uncommitted	3,697	0.59%	0	2	2
Henry Hewes	651	0.10%	0	0	0
Martin O'Malley (withdrawn)	437	0.07%	0	0	0
Jon Adams	428	0.07%	0	0	0
Rocky De La Fuente	340	0.05%	0	0	0
Willie Wilson	305	0.05%	0	0	0
Keith Judd	284	0.05%	0	0	0
John Wolfe	245	0.04%	0	0	0
Total	626,060	100%	71	13	84
Source:The Green Papers

=== Republican primary ===
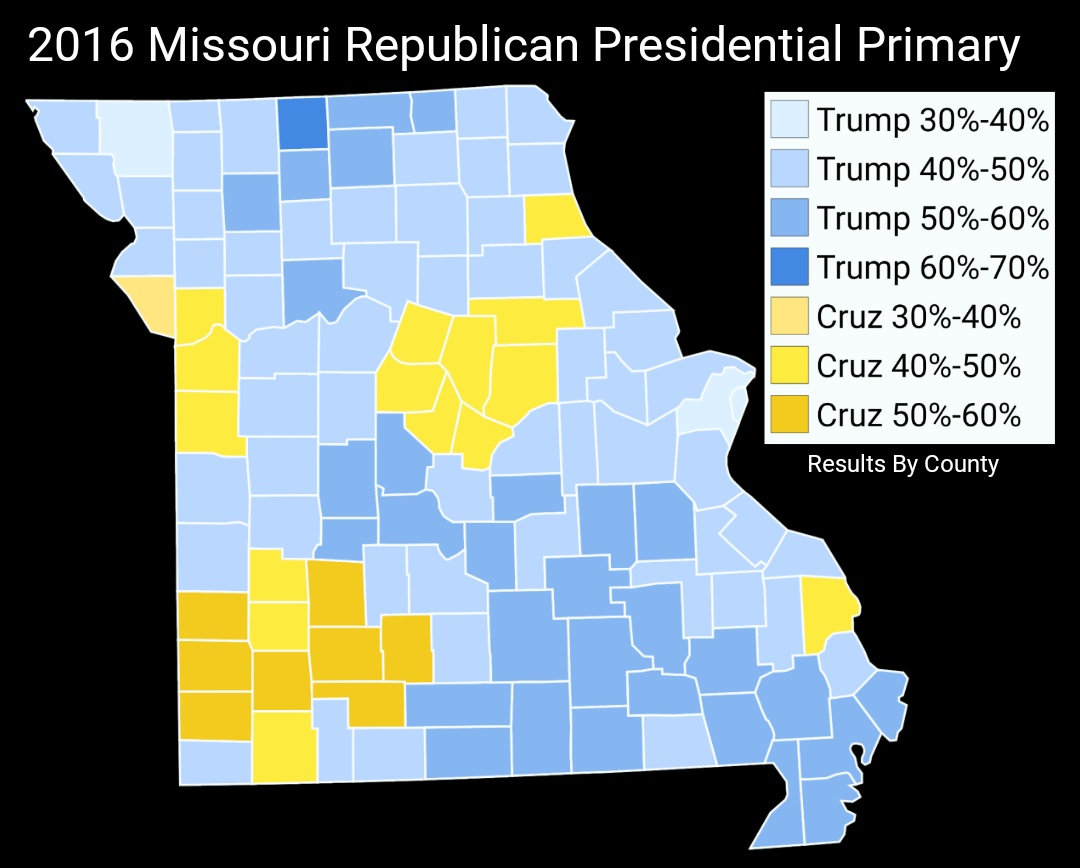
Donald Trump Ted Cruz

Twelve candidates appeared on the Republican presidential primary ballot:

- Jeb Bush (withdrawn)
- Ben Carson (withdrawn)
- Chris Christie (withdrawn)
- Ted Cruz
- Carly Fiorina (withdrawn)
- Mike Huckabee (withdrawn)
- John Kasich
- Rand Paul (withdrawn)
- Marco Rubio (withdrawn)
- Rick Santorum (withdrawn)
- Donald Trump

Missouri Republican primary, March 15, 2016
Candidate	Votes	Percentage	Actual delegate count		
Candidate	Votes	Percentage	Bound	Unbound	Total
Donald Trump	383,631	40.84%	37	0	37
Ted Cruz	381,666	40.63%	15	0	15
John Kasich	94,857	10.10%	0	0	0
Marco Rubio	57,244	6.09%	0	0	0
Ben Carson (withdrawn)	8,233	0.88%	0	0	0
Jeb Bush (withdrawn)	3,361	0.36%	0	0	0
Uncommitted	3,225	0.34%	0	0	0
Mike Huckabee (withdrawn)	2,148	0.23%	0	0	0
Rand Paul (withdrawn)	1,777	0.19%	0	0	0
Chris Christie (withdrawn)	1,681	0.18%	0	0	0
Rick Santorum (withdrawn)	732	0.08%	0	0	0
Carly Fiorina (withdrawn)	615	0.07%	0	0	0
Jim Lynch (withdrawn)	100	0.01%	0	0	0
Unprojected delegates:			0	0	0
Total:	939,270	100.00%	52	0	52
Source: The Green Papers

=== Libertarian primary ===
The Missouri primary ran on March 15, 2016, alongside those of the Republican, Democratic, and Constitution parties. Of the electorate, 40% voted to stand uncommitted to any candidate. Austin Petersen, running in his home state, finished second, with 29% of the statewide vote, which was double that of Steve Kerbel from Colorado, who finished third, with 14%. Petersen comfortably won the support of voters in the state's capital, Jefferson City, and its surrounding counties, but fell heavily behind the uncommitted vote in the state's two largest cities, Kansas City and St. Louis. Kerbel won three counties around Springfield, while Marc Allan Feldman, Cecil Ince, and Rhett Smith all won a sprawl of counties across the state; in most of these counties, however, only a single vote was cast. No votes were cast for Libertarian Party candidates in the northwestern counties of Harrison, Holt, Mercer, and Worth.

Missouri Libertarian presidential primary, March 15, 2016
Candidate	Votes	Percentage
Uncommitted	1,183	40.61%
Austin Petersen	854	29.32%
Steve Kerbel	401	13.77%
Marc Allan Feldman	242	8.31%
Cecil Ince	134	4.60%
Rhett Smith	99	3.40%
Total	2,913	100%

== General election ==
=== Polling ===
Republican Donald Trump won every pre-election poll conducted here except one. Trump won most polls by high single digits or low double digits. The average of the last three polls had Donald Trump leading Democrat Hillary Clinton 50% to 39%.

=== Predictions ===
The following are final 2016 predictions from various organizations for Missouri as of election day.

Source	Ranking	As of
Los Angeles Times	Likely R	November 6, 2016
CNN	Safe R	November 4, 2016
Cook Political Report	Likely R	November 7, 2016
Electoral-vote.com	Safe R	November 8, 2016
Rothenberg Political Report	Likely R	November 7, 2016
Sabato's Crystal Ball	Safe R	November 7, 2016
RealClearPolitics	Likely R	November 8, 2016
Fox News	Safe R	November 7, 2016

=== Results ===
The Statewide election results were as follows. The total vote count was 2,828,266.

2016 United States presidential election in Missouri
Party	Candidate	Votes	%
Republican	Donald Trump Mike Pence	1,594,511	56.8%
Democratic	Hillary Clinton Timothy Kaine	1,071,068	38.1%
Libertarian	Gary Johnson Bill Weld	97,359	3.5%
Green	Jill Stein Ajamu Baraka	25,419	0.90%
Constitution	Darrell L. Castle Scott N. Bradley	13,092	0.5%
Independent	Evan McMullin Nathan Johnson	7,071	0.3%
Independent	Tom Hoefling Steve Schulin	48	<0.01%
Independent	Laurence Kotlikoff Edward Leamer	28	<0.01%
Independent	"Rocky" Roque De La Fuente Michael Steinberg	6	<0.01%
Independent	Marshall Schoenke James Creighton Mitchell Jr.	3	<0.01%
Total votes		2,808,605	100%

==== By county ====
County	Donald Trump Republican		Hillary Clinton Democratic		Various candidates Other parties		Margin		Total
County	#	%	#	%	#	%	#	%	Total
Adair	6,030	58.97%	3,500	34.23%	696	6.80%	2,530	24.74%	10,226
Andrew	6,665	72.49%	2,045	22.24%	484	5.27%	4,620	50.25%	9,194
Atchison	2,060	75.46%	541	19.82%	129	4.72%	1,519	55.64%	2,730
Audrain	6,981	68.89%	2,570	25.36%	582	5.75%	4,411	43.53%	10,133
Barry	11,428	78.25%	2,710	18.56%	467	3.19%	8,718	59.69%	14,605
Barton	4,959	83.50%	795	13.39%	185	3.11%	4,164	70.11%	5,939
Bates	6,001	74.24%	1,618	20.02%	464	5.74%	4,383	54.22%	8,083
Benton	7,213	75.21%	2,025	21.12%	352	3.67%	5,188	54.09%	9,590
Bollinger	4,827	85.04%	705	12.42%	144	2.54%	4,122	72.62%	5,676
Boone	36,200	43.16%	41,125	49.04%	6,543	7.80%	-4,925	-5.88%	83,868
Buchanan	21,320	59.28%	12,013	33.40%	2,631	7.32%	9,307	25.88%	35,964
Butler	13,650	79.09%	3,036	17.59%	573	3.32%	10,614	61.50%	17,259
Caldwell	3,232	74.95%	838	19.43%	242	5.62%	2,394	55.52%	4,312
Callaway	13,057	67.54%	4,989	25.81%	1,287	6.65%	8,068	41.73%	19,333
Camden	16,944	74.71%	4,768	21.02%	968	4.27%	12,176	53.69%	22,680
Cape Girardeau	27,017	72.41%	8,492	22.76%	1,802	4.83%	18,525	49.65%	37,311
Carroll	3,480	79.80%	745	17.08%	136	3.12%	2,735	62.72%	4,361
Carter	2,324	81.54%	436	15.30%	90	3.16%	1,888	66.24%	2,850
Cass	33,098	64.38%	14,846	28.88%	3,466	6.74%	18,252	35.50%	51,410
Cedar	5,021	79.36%	1,011	15.98%	295	4.66%	4,010	63.38%	6,327
Chariton	2,950	74.33%	888	22.37%	131	3.30%	2,062	51.96%	3,969
Christian	30,946	73.92%	8,508	20.32%	2,409	5.76%	22,438	53.60%	41,863
Clark	2,458	74.13%	724	21.83%	134	4.04%	1,734	52.30%	3,316
Clay	57,476	51.70%	45,304	40.75%	8,390	7.55%	12,172	10.95%	111,170
Clinton	7,067	68.60%	2,572	24.97%	662	6.43%	4,495	43.63%	10,301
Cole	24,616	65.37%	10,913	28.98%	2,127	5.65%	13,703	36.39%	37,656
Cooper	5,624	70.42%	1,932	24.19%	430	5.39%	3,692	46.23%	7,986
Crawford	7,724	77.86%	1,824	18.39%	372	3.75%	5,900	59.47%	9,920
Dade	3,184	80.59%	637	16.12%	130	3.29%	2,547	64.47%	3,951
Dallas	5,895	79.10%	1,272	17.07%	286	3.83%	4,623	62.03%	7,453
Daviess	2,767	74.02%	730	19.53%	241	6.45%	2,037	54.49%	3,738
DeKalb	3,540	76.52%	824	17.81%	262	5.67%	2,716	58.71%	4,626
Dent	5,600	82.46%	978	14.40%	213	3.14%	4,622	68.06%	6,791
Douglas	5,486	82.30%	984	14.76%	196	2.94%	4,502	67.54%	6,666
Dunklin	8,026	75.87%	2,360	22.31%	192	1.82%	5,666	53.56%	10,578
Franklin	35,430	70.20%	12,341	24.45%	2,701	5.35%	23,089	45.75%	50,472
Gasconade	5,670	76.10%	1,520	20.40%	261	3.50%	4,150	55.70%	7,451
Gentry	2,304	75.71%	605	19.88%	134	4.41%	1,699	55.83%	3,043
Greene	78,035	59.79%	42,728	32.74%	9,760	7.47%	35,307	27.05%	130,523
Grundy	3,462	78.18%	780	17.62%	186	4.20%	2,682	60.56%	4,428
Harrison	2,965	80.37%	574	15.56%	150	4.07%	2,391	64.81%	3,689
Henry	7,075	71.38%	2,357	23.78%	480	4.84%	4,718	47.60%	9,912
Hickory	3,542	74.40%	1,016	21.34%	203	4.26%	2,526	53.06%	4,761
Holt	1,926	81.78%	347	14.73%	82	3.49%	1,579	67.05%	2,355
Howard	3,277	67.32%	1,283	26.36%	308	6.32%	1,994	40.96%	4,868
Howell	13,893	79.59%	2,881	16.51%	681	3.90%	11,012	63.08%	17,455
Iron	3,173	74.33%	933	21.86%	163	3.81%	2,240	52.47%	4,269
Jackson	116,211	38.14%	168,972	55.46%	19,504	6.40%	-52,761	-17.32%	304,687
Jasper	35,070	72.57%	10,572	21.88%	2,684	5.55%	24,498	50.69%	48,326
Jefferson	69,036	64.52%	31,568	29.50%	6,391	5.98%	37,468	35.02%	106,995
Johnson	13,719	64.22%	5,930	27.76%	1,713	8.02%	7,789	36.46%	21,362
Knox	1,416	75.72%	379	20.27%	75	4.01%	1,037	55.45%	1,870
Laclede	12,881	79.81%	2,553	15.82%	706	4.37%	10,328	63.99%	16,140
Lafayette	10,988	68.78%	4,053	25.37%	934	5.85%	6,935	43.41%	15,975
Lawrence	13,089	77.86%	2,901	17.26%	821	4.88%	10,188	60.60%	16,811
Lewis	3,344	74.64%	934	20.85%	202	4.51%	2,410	53.79%	4,480
Lincoln	18,159	72.31%	5,575	22.20%	1,380	5.49%	12,584	50.11%	25,114
Linn	4,088	73.17%	1,240	22.19%	259	4.64%	2,848	50.98%	5,587
Livingston	4,879	75.99%	1,265	19.70%	277	4.31%	3,614	56.29%	6,421
Macon	5,798	75.98%	1,548	20.29%	285	3.73%	4,250	55.69%	7,631
Madison	4,102	77.09%	1,005	18.89%	214	4.02%	3,097	58.20%	5,321
Maries	3,561	79.13%	794	17.64%	145	3.23%	2,767	61.49%	4,500
Marion	9,419	72.80%	2,994	23.14%	525	4.06%	6,425	49.66%	12,938
McDonald	6,599	79.49%	1,329	16.01%	374	4.50%	5,270	63.48%	8,302
Mercer	1,486	85.16%	216	12.38%	43	2.46%	1,270	72.78%	1,745
Miller	9,285	80.87%	1,750	15.24%	447	3.89%	7,535	65.63%	11,482
Mississippi	3,600	69.65%	1,458	28.21%	111	2.14%	2,142	41.44%	5,169
Moniteau	5,347	78.29%	1,237	18.11%	246	3.60%	4,110	60.18%	6,830
Monroe	3,159	76.01%	853	20.52%	144	3.47%	2,306	55.49%	4,156
Montgomery	4,127	76.02%	1,119	20.61%	183	3.37%	3,008	55.41%	5,429
Morgan	6,760	76.64%	1,768	20.04%	293	3.32%	4,992	56.60%	8,821
New Madrid	5,270	71.63%	1,933	26.27%	154	2.10%	3,337	45.36%	7,357
Newton	20,553	76.67%	4,990	18.61%	1,264	4.72%	15,563	58.06%	26,807
Nodaway	6,380	67.46%	2,529	26.74%	549	5.80%	3,851	40.72%	9,458
Oregon	3,671	78.64%	865	18.53%	132	2.83%	2,806	60.11%	4,668
Osage	5,856	82.60%	998	14.08%	236	3.32%	4,858	68.52%	7,090
Ozark	3,639	80.78%	724	16.07%	142	3.15%	2,915	64.71%	4,505
Pemiscot	3,964	65.60%	1,947	32.22%	132	2.18%	2,017	33.38%	6,043
Perry	6,908	79.04%	1,520	17.39%	312	3.57%	5,388	61.65%	8,740
Pettis	12,810	70.37%	4,324	23.75%	1,070	5.88%	8,486	46.62%	18,204
Phelps	12,709	67.92%	4,766	25.47%	1,238	6.61%	7,943	42.45%	18,713
Pike	5,274	71.00%	1,806	24.31%	348	4.69%	3,468	46.69%	7,428
Platte	25,933	52.28%	20,057	40.43%	3,618	7.29%	5,876	11.85%	49,608
Polk	10,438	75.84%	2,631	19.12%	694	5.04%	7,807	56.72%	13,763
Pulaski	9,876	72.71%	2,922	21.51%	784	5.78%	6,954	51.20%	13,582
Putnam	1,936	82.52%	353	15.05%	57	2.43%	1,583	67.47%	2,346
Ralls	3,969	74.97%	1,138	21.50%	187	3.53%	2,831	53.47%	5,294
Randolph	7,529	72.34%	2,283	21.94%	596	5.72%	5,246	50.40%	10,408
Ray	7,104	64.91%	3,090	28.23%	751	6.86%	4,014	36.68%	10,945
Reynolds	2,406	79.20%	540	17.77%	92	3.03%	1,866	61.43%	3,038
Ripley	4,522	81.86%	830	15.03%	172	3.11%	3,692	66.83%	5,524
Saline	5,977	64.45%	2,789	30.07%	508	5.48%	3,188	34.38%	9,274
Schuyler	1,505	77.74%	354	18.29%	77	3.97%	1,151	59.45%	1,936
Scotland	1,525	76.98%	365	18.43%	91	4.59%	1,160	58.55%	1,981
Scott	13,168	75.95%	3,575	20.62%	594	3.43%	9,593	55.33%	17,337
Shannon	2,966	75.97%	776	19.88%	162	4.15%	2,190	56.09%	3,904
Shelby	2,524	77.09%	606	18.51%	144	4.40%	1,918	58.58%	3,274
St. Charles	121,650	59.87%	68,626	33.78%	12,908	6.35%	53,024	26.09%	203,184
St. Clair	3,501	75.62%	936	20.22%	193	4.16%	2,565	55.40%	4,630
St. Francois	17,468	70.10%	6,250	25.08%	1,202	4.82%	11,218	45.02%	24,920
St. Louis	202,434	38.95%	286,704	55.17%	30,548	5.88%	-84,270	-16.22%	519,686
St. Louis City	20,832	15.72%	104,235	78.68%	7,420	5.60%	-83,403	-62.96%	132,487
Ste. Genevieve	5,496	64.57%	2,542	29.86%	474	5.57%	2,954	34.71%	8,512
Stoddard	11,079	83.36%	1,876	14.11%	336	2.53%	9,203	69.25%	13,291
Stone	13,158	79.05%	2,887	17.34%	600	3.61%	10,271	61.71%	16,645
Sullivan	1,884	75.78%	526	21.16%	76	3.06%	1,358	54.62%	2,486
Taney	18,276	77.20%	4,373	18.47%	1,024	4.33%	13,903	58.73%	23,673
Texas	8,875	81.01%	1,728	15.77%	353	3.22%	7,147	65.24%	10,956
Vernon	6,533	75.69%	1,707	19.78%	391	4.53%	4,826	55.91%	8,631
Warren	11,111	70.39%	3,915	24.80%	758	4.81%	7,196	45.59%	15,784
Washington	7,048	75.53%	1,926	20.64%	357	3.83%	5,122	54.89%	9,331
Wayne	4,658	80.84%	948	16.45%	156	2.71%	3,710	64.39%	5,762
Webster	12,840	76.69%	3,177	18.98%	726	4.33%	9,663	57.71%	16,743
Worth	808	77.25%	195	18.64%	43	4.11%	613	58.61%	1,046
Wright	6,707	82.61%	1,170	14.41%	242	2.98%	5,537	68.20%	8,119
Totals	1,594,511	56.38%	1,071,068	37.87%	162,687	5.75%	523,443	18.51%	2,828,266

==== By congressional district ====
Trump won six of eight congressional districts.

District	Trump	Clinton	Representative
1st	19%	77%	Lacy Clay
2nd	53%	42%	Ann Wagner
3rd	67%	28%	Blaine Luetkemeyer
4th	65%	29%	Vicky Hartzler
5th	40%	55%	Emanuel Cleaver
6th	64%	31%	Sam Graves
7th	70%	25%	Billy Long
8th	75%	21%	Jason Smith

== Analysis ==
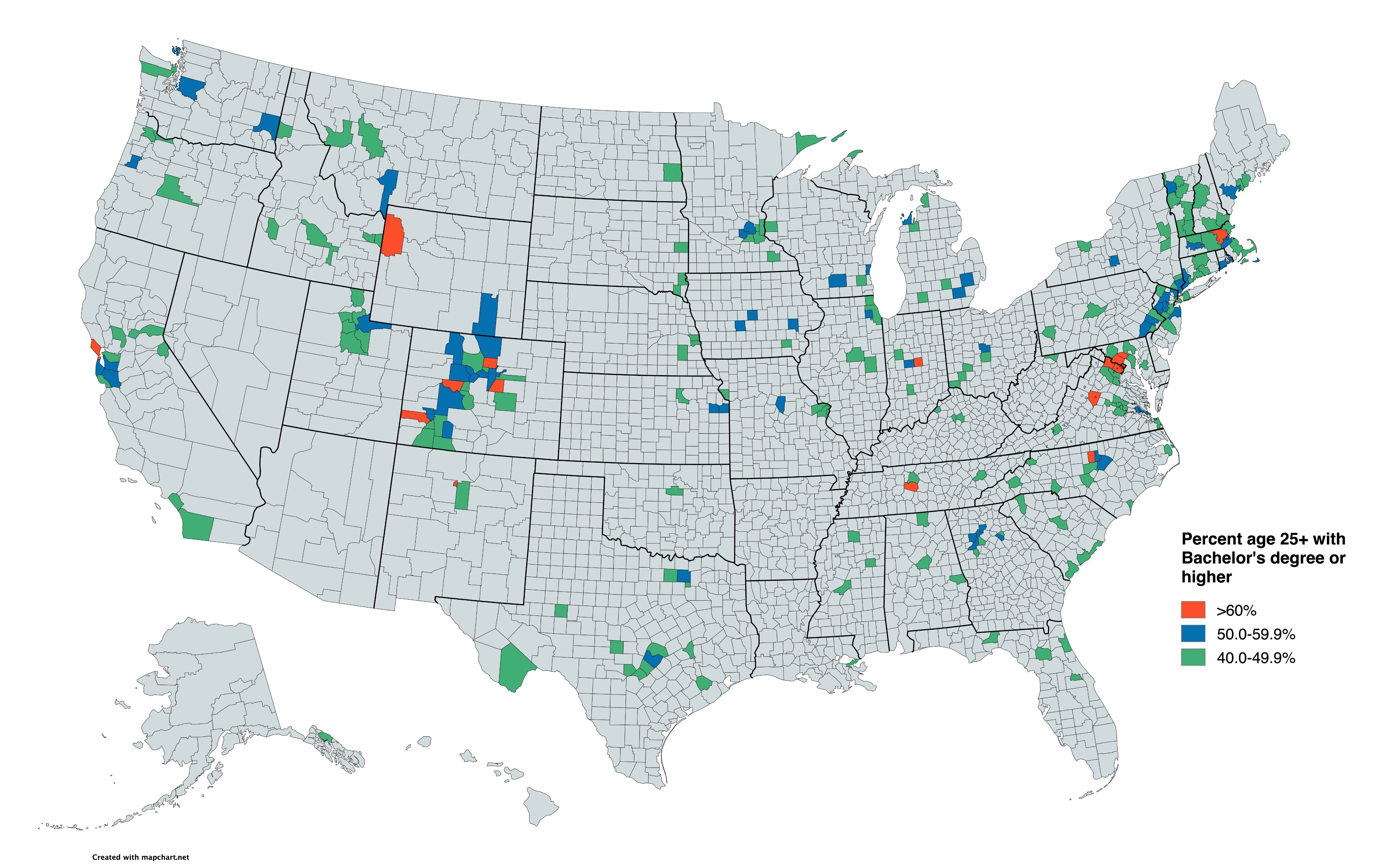
A map of the most college-educated counties in the United States

Although Trump's victory in the state was expected, Missouri had one of the larger shifts towards Trump, shifting rightward by 9%. Trump's 18.5% margin of victory in Missouri was the largest for a Republican since Ronald Reagan in 1984.

The state was once considered a bellwether, voting for the winner of every presidential election from 1904 to 2004 (except for 1956), and almost voting for Obama in 2008.

Consistent with Trump's largest gains in 2016 being among whites without college degrees in the Midwest, Upland South, and Northern United States, some counties in Missouri swung by margins upwards of 25% towards Trump. Trump particularly gained ground in the Lead Belt.

Despite Clinton losing the state, she did make some gains in college-educated counties, particularly Boone County, home to Columbia, Missouri and the University of Missouri. Clinton also gained in the Kansas City metropolitan area and St. Louis metropolitan area. Tim Kaine, Clinton's running mate, had received his Bachelor's degree at the University of Missouri.

== See also ==
- United States presidential elections in Missouri
- 2016 Democratic Party presidential debates and forums
- 2016 Democratic Party presidential primaries
- 2016 Republican Party presidential debates and forums
- 2016 Republican Party presidential primaries
- 2016 Libertarian Party presidential primaries
