= 2012 Idaho Republican presidential caucuses =

- March 6, 2012

32 delegates to the 2012 Republican National Convention
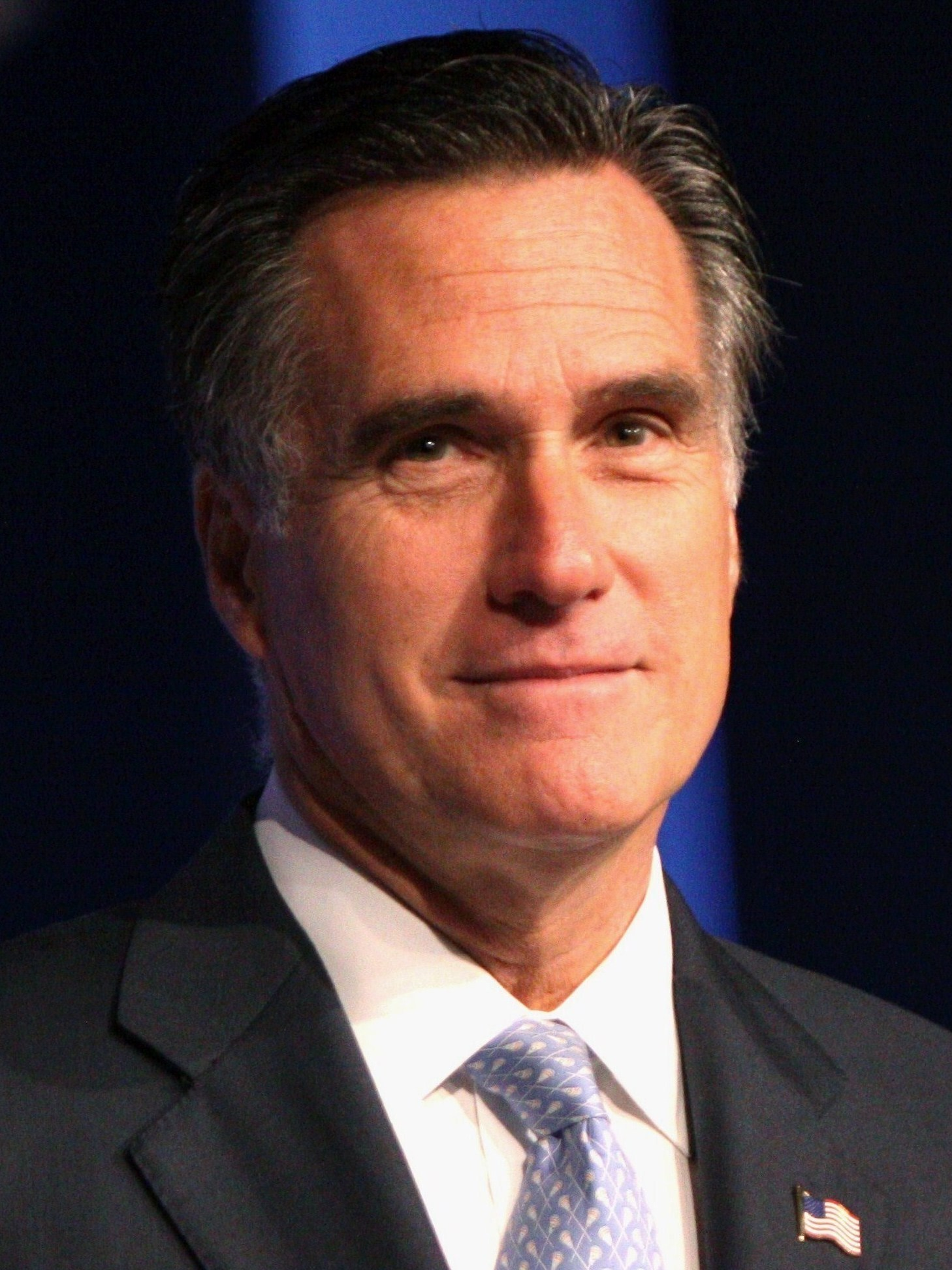

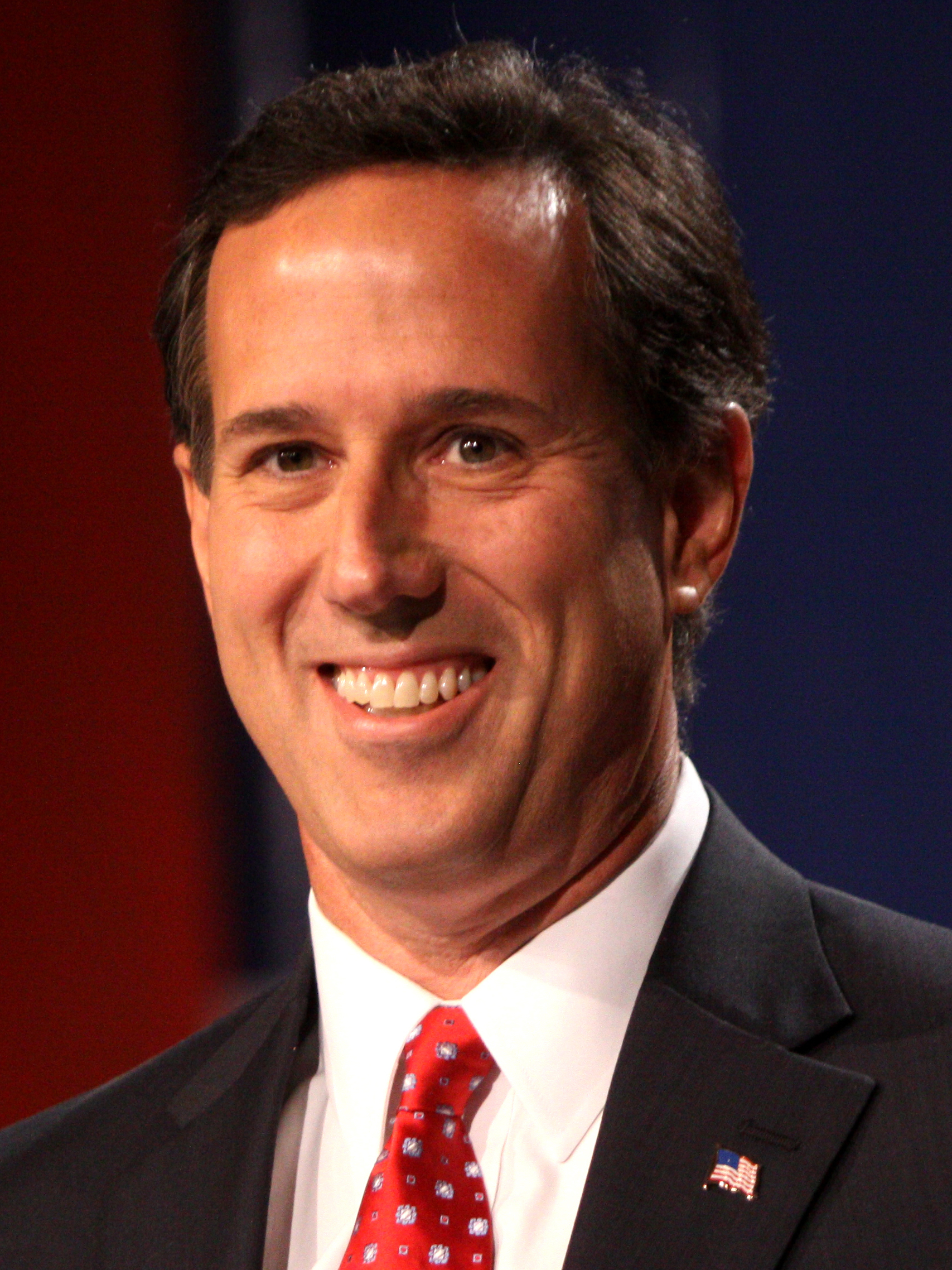

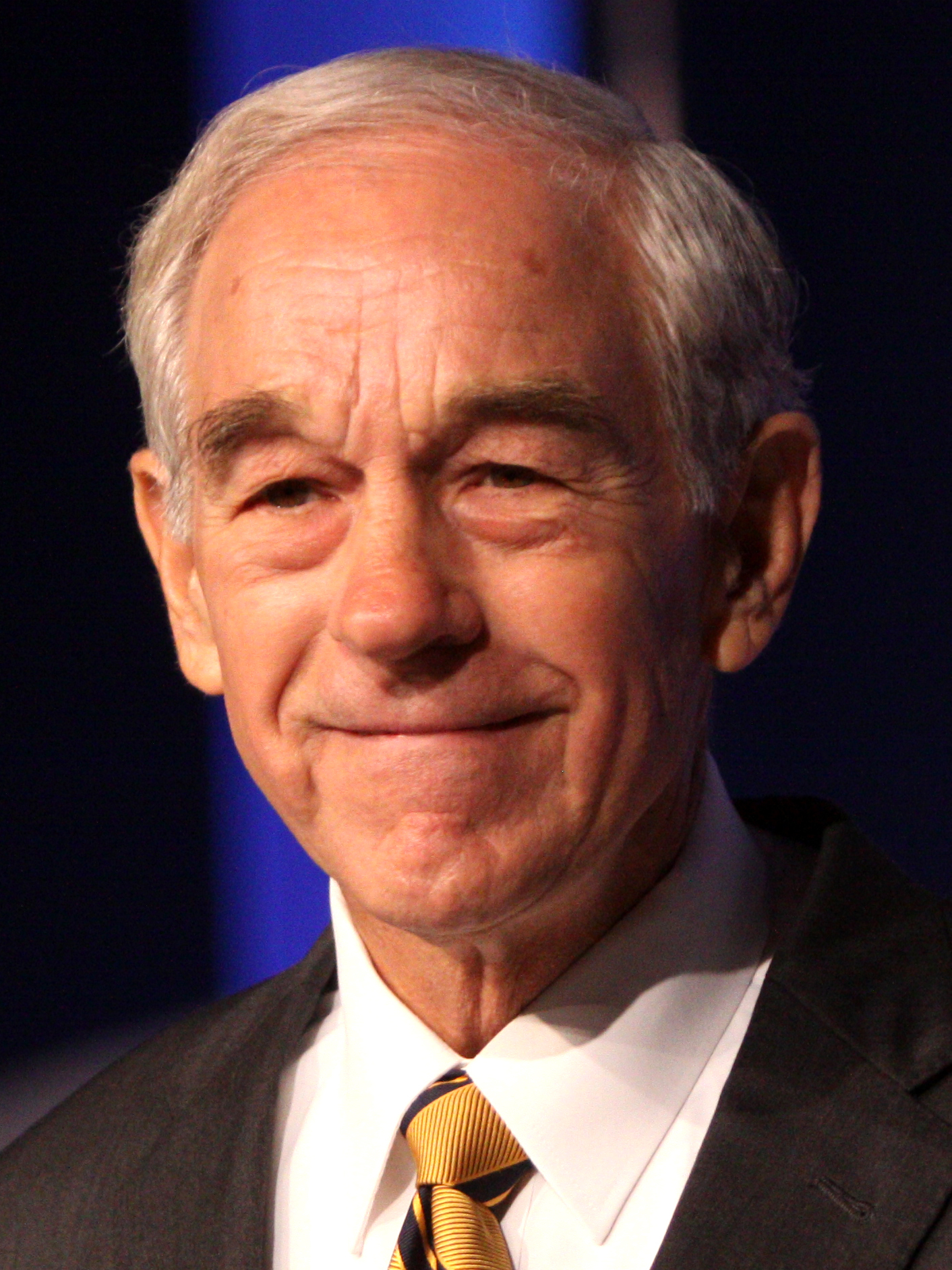
Candidate	Mitt Romney	Rick Santorum	Ron Paul
Home state	Massachusetts	Pennsylvania	Texas
Delegate count	32	0	0
Popular vote	27,514	8,115	8,086
Percentage	61.6%	18.2%	18.1%
Romney
50–60%
60–70%
70–80%
80–90%
Santorum
50–60%
60–70%
Paul
50–60%

The Republican caucuses took place on Super Tuesday, March 6, 2012. An advisory primary with no binding effect on delegates, scheduled to be held on Tuesday May 15, 2012, was cancelled by the Idaho Republican Party. Five candidates were on the ballot. In order of filing they are Ron Paul, Mitt Romney, Rick Santorum, Newt Gingrich, and Buddy Roemer. Although Roemer had withdrawn from the Republican race before the Idaho caucus, he still appeared on the ballot.

Mitt Romney won 61% of the vote, thanks to a large majority of support (80-90% in most counties) in majority Mormon southeastern Idaho, rendering it a winner-take-all contest. Santorum and Paul split the Panhandle, winning five counties each, but came away empty in the delegate count.

== Procedure ==
Idaho has 32 delegates to the Republican national convention, of which 3 are RNC and 29 are AL. The 3 RNC delegates pledged to go with the results of the Boise Straw Poll. The delegates will be determined by the caucuses results, based on a two-step approach. First, the delegates are primarily awarded winner-take-all by county after a series of votes in which candidates are successively removed from the ballot. Then, if a candidate receives half or more of the county delegates, he will receive all the 32 delegates; if not, the delegates will be split proportionately according to the number of county delegates.

== Polling ==
=== Straw polls ===
Despite a complete lack of formal polling in the state, there were a total of five straw polls conducted in Idaho, three of which were online. Ron Paul won three of these, while Mitt Romney won two.

==== January 2–4 online poll ====
This was the first ever Idaho straw poll. It was conducted entirely online by Kaz Wittig KStar Enterprises. Ron Paul won with over 70% of the vote.

Finish	Candidate	Percentage
1	Ron Paul	73.53%
2	Rick Santorum	8.09%
3	Newt Gingrich	7.35%
4	Mitt Romney	5.15%
5	Barack Obama	3.68%
6	Gary Johnson	1.47%
7	Rick Perry	0.74%
8	Jon Huntsman	0.00%
9	Michele Bachmann	0.00%
	Total	100%

==== January 6 Boise poll ====
This poll used paper ballots and was conducted in Boise. Ron Paul won this poll. Rick Perry's campaign, although still active in the race at this time, did not participate.

Finish	Candidate	Percentage	Votes
1	Ron Paul	43%	173
2	Mitt Romney	34%	135
3	Newt Gingrich	12%	47
4	Rick Santorum	10%	40
5	Jon Huntsman	1%	4
	Total	100%	399

==== February 2–4 online poll ====
This online straw poll was also produced by Kaz Wittig KStar Enterprises. Mitt Romney won the poll by a small margin.

Finish	Candidate	Percentage
1	Mitt Romney	45.39%
2	Ron Paul	42.70%
3	Rick Santorum	4.49%
4	Newt Gingrich	3.82%
5	Barack Obama	3.15%
6	Other	0.45%
	Total	100%

==== March 1–3 online poll ====
This poll was also produced by Kaz Wittig KStar Enterprises. Ron Paul won by a double-digit margin.

Finish	Candidate	Percentage	Votes
1	Ron Paul	51.37%	525
2	Mitt Romney	35.03%	358
3	Gary Johnson	3.91%	40
4	Rick Santorum	3.23%	33
5	Virgil Goode	2.84%	29
6	Buddy Roemer	1.96%	20
7	Newt Gingrich	0.98%	10
8	Barack Obama	0.49%	5
9	Other	0.2%	2
	Total	100%	1022

== Results ==
Results of the 2012 Idaho Republican presidential caucuses
Finish	Candidate	Percentage	Votes	Estimated National Delegates
1	Mitt Romney	61.6%	27,514	32
2	Rick Santorum	18.2%	8,115	0
3	Ron Paul	18.1%	8,086	0
4	Newt Gingrich	2.1%	940	0
5	Buddy Roemer	0.0%	17	0
	Total	100%		32

=== County totals ===
County	Newt Gingrich	Ron Paul	Mitt Romney	Rick Santorum	Total	Winner
Ada	307	1766	4233	1866	8172	Romney
Adams	0	85	132	0	217	Romney
Bannock	24	254	1614	146	2038	Romney
Bear Lake	2	15	308	19	344	Romney
Benewah	24	90	26	145	265	Santorum
Bingham	27	215	2172	150	2564	Romney
Blaine	47	79	230	23	379	Romney
Boise	0	128	163	0	291	Romney
Bonner	0	555	0	487	1042	Paul
Bonneville	65	481	3044	235	3825	Romney
Boundary	0	193	64	101	358	Paul
Butte	10	25	153	23	211	Romney
Camas	0	40	38	0	78	Paul
Canyon	0	617	2056	1296	3969	Romney
Caribou	7	22	336	26	391	Romney
Cassia	28	143	1279	144	1594	Romney
Clark	2	8	88	17	115	Romney
Clearwater	0	85	0	151	236	Santorum
Custer	19	48	98	24	189	Romney
Elmore	0	158	281	0	439	Romney
Franklin	4	105	856	29	994	Romney
Fremont	12	76	726	38	852	Romney
Gem	0	150	379	143	672	Romney
Gooding	47	84	299	86	516	Romney
Idaho	0	284	0	191	475	Paul
Jefferson	11	212	1642	114	1979	Romney
Jerome	28	74	331	101	534	Romney
Kootenai	0	496	0	674	1170	Santorum
Latah	78	509	197	188	972	Paul
Lemhi	44	60	217	64	385	Romney
Lewis	0	0	25	44	69	Santorum
Lincoln	14	11	147	49	221	Romney
Madison	7	260	2510	50	2827	Romney
Minidoka	22	80	653	92	847	Romney
Nez Perce	0	127	124	0	251	Paul
Oneida	3	39	241	18	301	Romney
Owyhee	0	0	177	263	440	Santorum
Payette	0	0	428	302	730	Romney
Power	9	13	287	38	347	Romney
Shoshone	0	0	63	74	137	Santorum
Teton	13	44	295	26	378	Romney
Twin Falls	83	332	1228	409	2052	Romney
Valley	0	123	152	0	275	Romney
Washington	0	0	222	269	491	Santorum

== Notes ==
- That these totals reflect the final caucus ballots in each county; where only two candidates have votes totaled, this was likely from other candidates being eliminated in previous rounds of voting. Where all candidates have at least one vote, only one ballot was necessary, since the winning candidate had a majority of votes in that county.
- Vote totals for Buddy Roemer, who had formally withdrawn from the Republican race before the caucus, are not provided.
