= 2008 Idaho Democratic presidential caucuses =

- February 5, 2008

23 Democratic National Convention delegates (18 pledged, 5 unpledged) The number of pledged delegates received is determined by the popular vote.

Candidate	Barack Obama	Hillary Clinton
Home state	Illinois	New York
Delegate count	15	3
Popular vote	16,880	3,652
Percentage	79.54%	17.21%
- Caucus results by county Obama: 50–60% 60–70% 70–80% 80–90% 100% Clinton: 50–60%

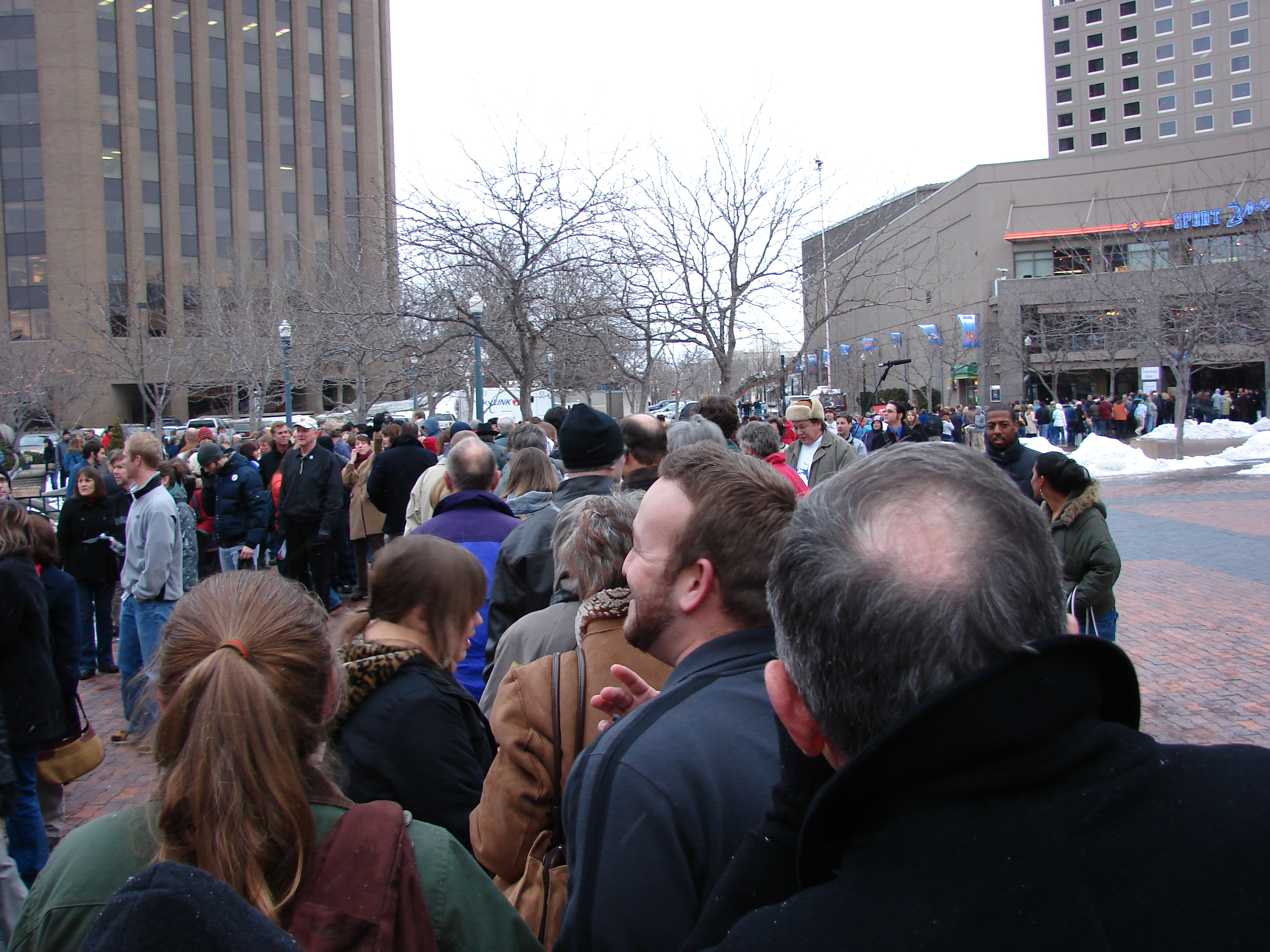
Soon to be caucusing in Boise, Idaho

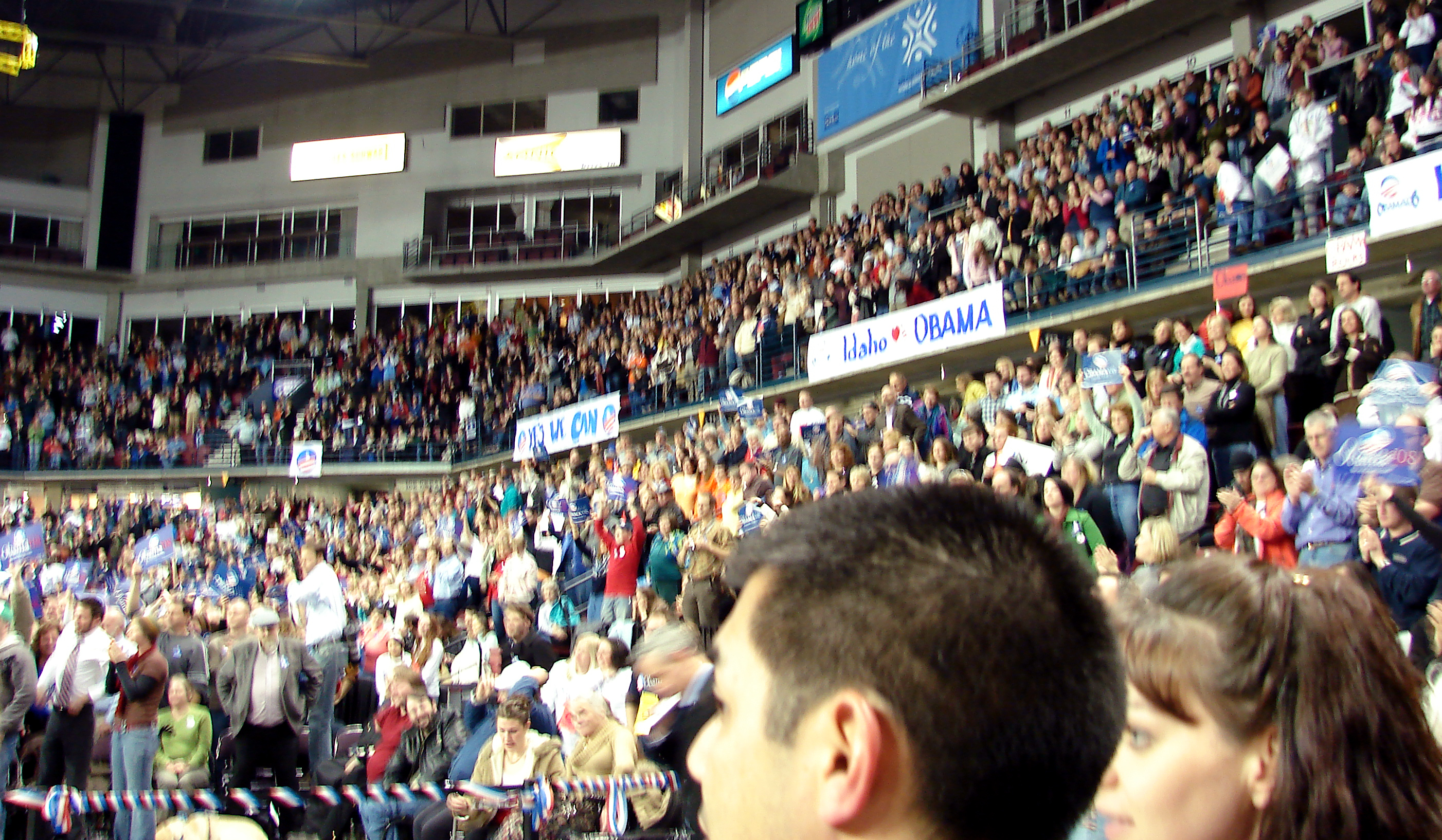
A portion of the Obama side of Congressional District 2 in Qwest Arena

The 2008 Idaho Democratic presidential caucuses were held on Super Tuesday, February 5, 2008, with 18 national delegates at stake. For the first time, caucuses were held in all 44 counties, all of them open caucuses organized at the county level rather than the precinct level.

The Idaho Democratic Caucus was overwhelmingly won by Barack Obama, who won 15 of Idaho's 18 delegates, 44 of the 45 county-level caucuses, and the support of 79.54 percent of caucus attendees statewide, his largest margin of victory in any state during the 2008 Democratic presidential primary season. A handful of caucus attendees pledged to support John Edwards on the first ballot even though he had dropped out of the race the previous week; this residual support was sufficient to give him a third-place finish.

Each of Idaho's 44 counties held its own caucus except for Ada County, which held two: one for the part of the county in the First Congressional District, and the other for the part of the county in the Second Congressional District. Collectively, both Ada County caucuses (which convened at Qwest Arena in Downtown Boise) were notable for the unprecedented mass public participation which made them the largest caucus gathering of Super Tuesday 2008: 3,075 votes were cast by the constituents of the 1st Congressional District and 5,215 votes were cast by those of the 2nd Congressional District for a grand total of 8,290 votes cast at a single venue. Thousands of freshly printed ballots were rushed to those caucusing outside the arena in frigid weather. Much higher than anticipated attendance was also reported at other caucus locations throughout the state. Statewide, some 28,000 people caucused, an order of magnitude increase over the approximately 5,000 who had caucused throughout Idaho in 2004.

== Process ==
Since at the time Idaho residents did not choose a political party preference at voter registration, the 2008 Idaho Democratic Caucus was open to all individuals who were or would have been qualified to vote in the general election in Idaho on November 4, 2008, including those who were not registered or who were not yet legally old enough to vote (but were going to be legally old enough to vote at the national election). Caucus attendees were required to sign a pledge that they planned on voting Democratic in the county in which they were caucusing. After signing in, participants either marked their first presidential preference or declared themselves uncommitted.

As in past years, the caucuses employed a 15-percent support threshold at the county level. If a candidate failed to meet that threshold on the first vote, the candidate was eliminated from consideration at the county level. A second vote was then taken with all participants free to declare or re-declare their support for any remaining candidate or for "Uncommitted." In 2008, Barack Obama was the only candidate to meet the threshold requirement on the first vote in several counties, most notably in Ada County. Clinton won the caucus vote only in one county: Lewis County in the Northern Panhandle of the state.

After the second vote, county caucuses were broken up into groups by candidate support. These groups then selected county delegates and alternates to the Idaho Democratic Party State Convention who were pledged but unbound by the results. The 2008 Idaho Democratic Party State Convention was held June 12–14, 2008, in Garden City.

== Campaigning ==
Senator Barack Obama made a campaign stop at Taco Bell Arena in Boise State University before Super Tuesday and told voters that he would not take their guns away.

== Results ==
=== County caucuses ===
Caucus date: February 5, 2008

2008 Idaho Democratic presidential caucus results
Party	Candidate	Votes	Percentage	Delegates
Democratic	Barack Obama	16,880	79.54%	15
Democratic	Hillary Clinton	3,652	17.21%	3
Democratic	Uncommitted	552	2.60%	0
Democratic	John Edwards	137	0.65%	0
Totals		21,221	100.00%	18
Voter turnout		%		—

=== Primary ===
On May 27, 2008, a non-binding presidential preference primary was held on the Democratic ticket. The primary had no impact on the Democratic Party delegate selection process. Obama won the primary, but by a considerably smaller margin than his caucus win three months earlier.

Primary date: May 27, 2008

2008 Idaho Democratic presidential primary results
Party	Candidate	Votes	Percentage	Delegates
Democratic	Barack Obama	23,980	56.03%	0
Democratic	Hillary Clinton	16,122	37.67%	0
Democratic	Uncommitted	1,966	4.59%	0
Democratic	Others	734	1.71%	0
Totals		42,802	100.00%	0
Voter turnout		%		—

The 734 votes assigned to 'others' in the table were awarded to Keith Russell Judd, who ran his 2008 presidential campaign from federal prison in Texas. He would run against Barack Obama again in 2012, still from prison, winning ten counties in West Virginia, and coming in second with 73k votes to Obama's 106k votes in that state's 2012 democratic primary.

== Analysis ==
Idaho, one of the most staunchly Republican states in the nation, is difficult to analyze for Democrats. The state delivered a massive three-to-one victory for Obama, his largest victory in the course of the 2008 Democratic presidential primary.

== See also ==
- 2008 Democratic Party presidential primaries
- 2008 Idaho Republican presidential primary
