= 2008 Idaho Republican presidential primary =

- May 27, 2008
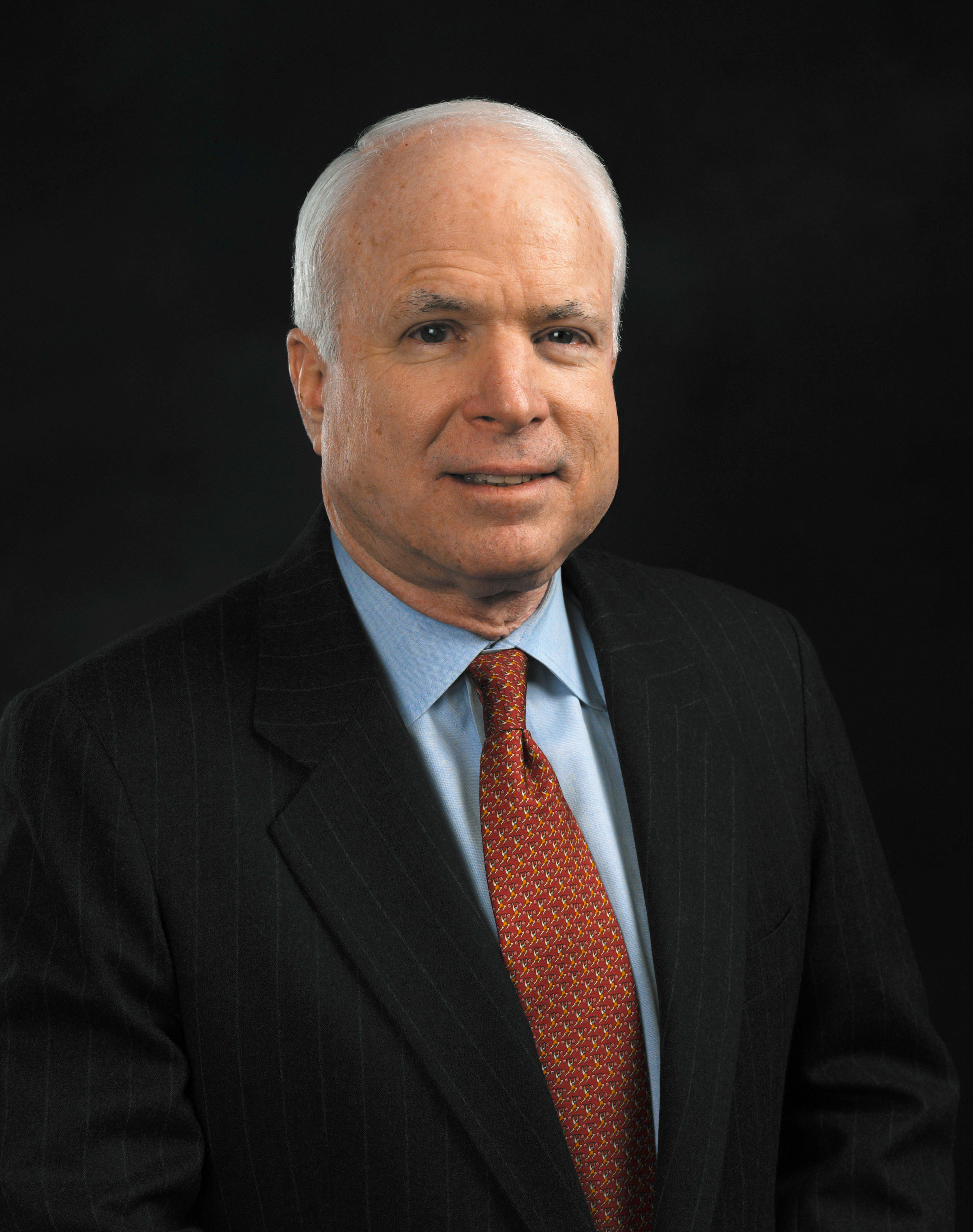

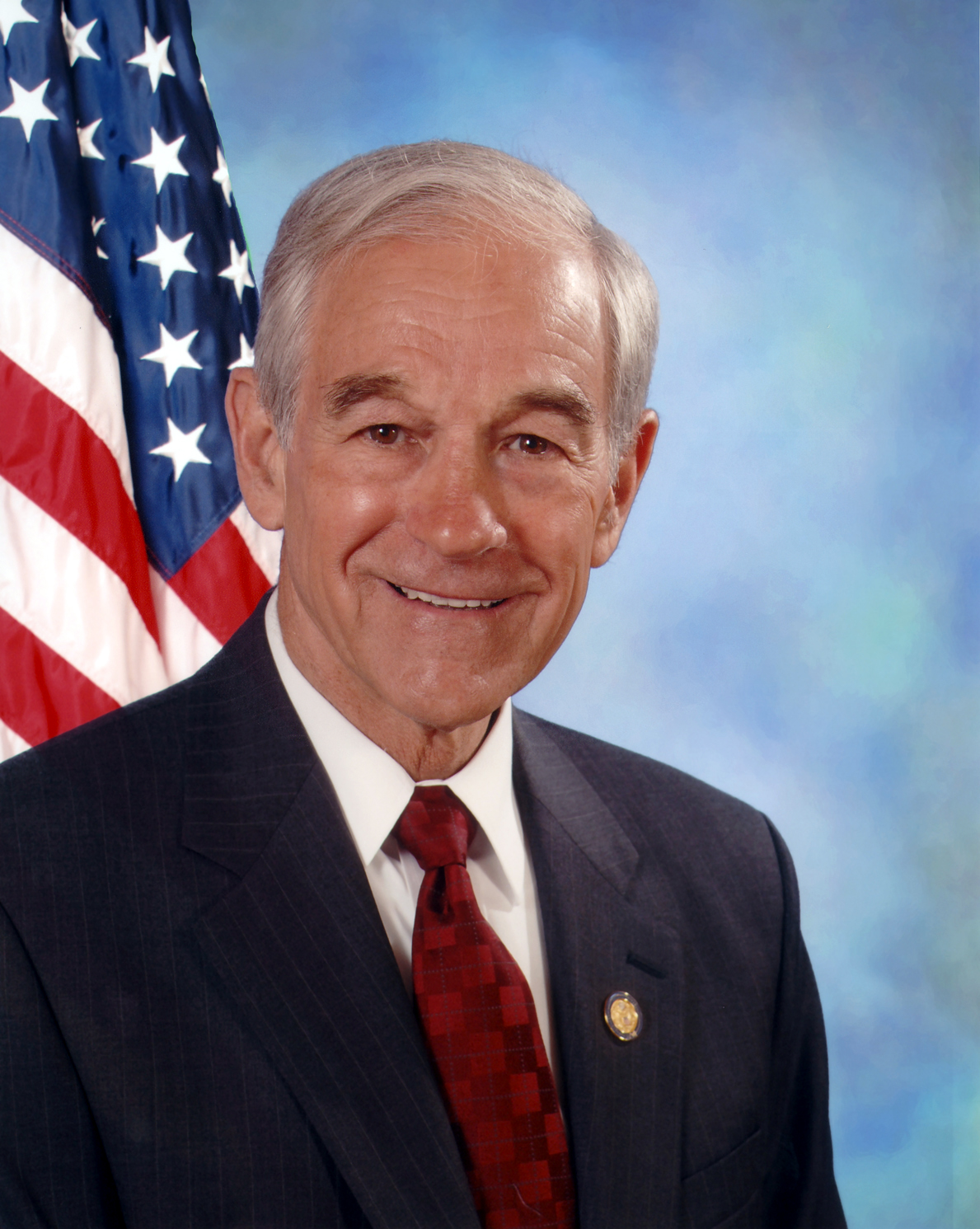
Candidate	John McCain	Ron Paul
Party	Republican	Republican
Home state	Arizona	Texas
Delegate count	17	6
Popular vote	87,460	29,785
Percentage	69.65%	23.72%
- Election results by county. John McCain

The 2008 Idaho Republican presidential primary took place on May 27, 2008. John McCain won the primary, although before the election he had already won enough pledged delegates in earlier primaries to secure his nomination at the 2008 Republican National Convention.

Texas Congressman Ron Paul finished second with 24 percent of the vote, which was his best showing in a primary state even though McCain had been declared the presumptive Republican nominee several weeks before the Idaho primary.

== Results ==
100% of precincts reporting
Candidate	Votes	Percentage	Delegates
John McCain	87,460	69.65%	17
Ron Paul	29,785	23.72%	6
Uncommitted	8,325	6.63%	1

== See also ==
- 2008 Idaho Democratic presidential caucuses
- 2008 Republican Party presidential primaries
