= Sioux Falls metropolitan area =

Metropolitan area in the United States

Sioux Falls Metropolitan Area
- Metropolitan Statistical Area
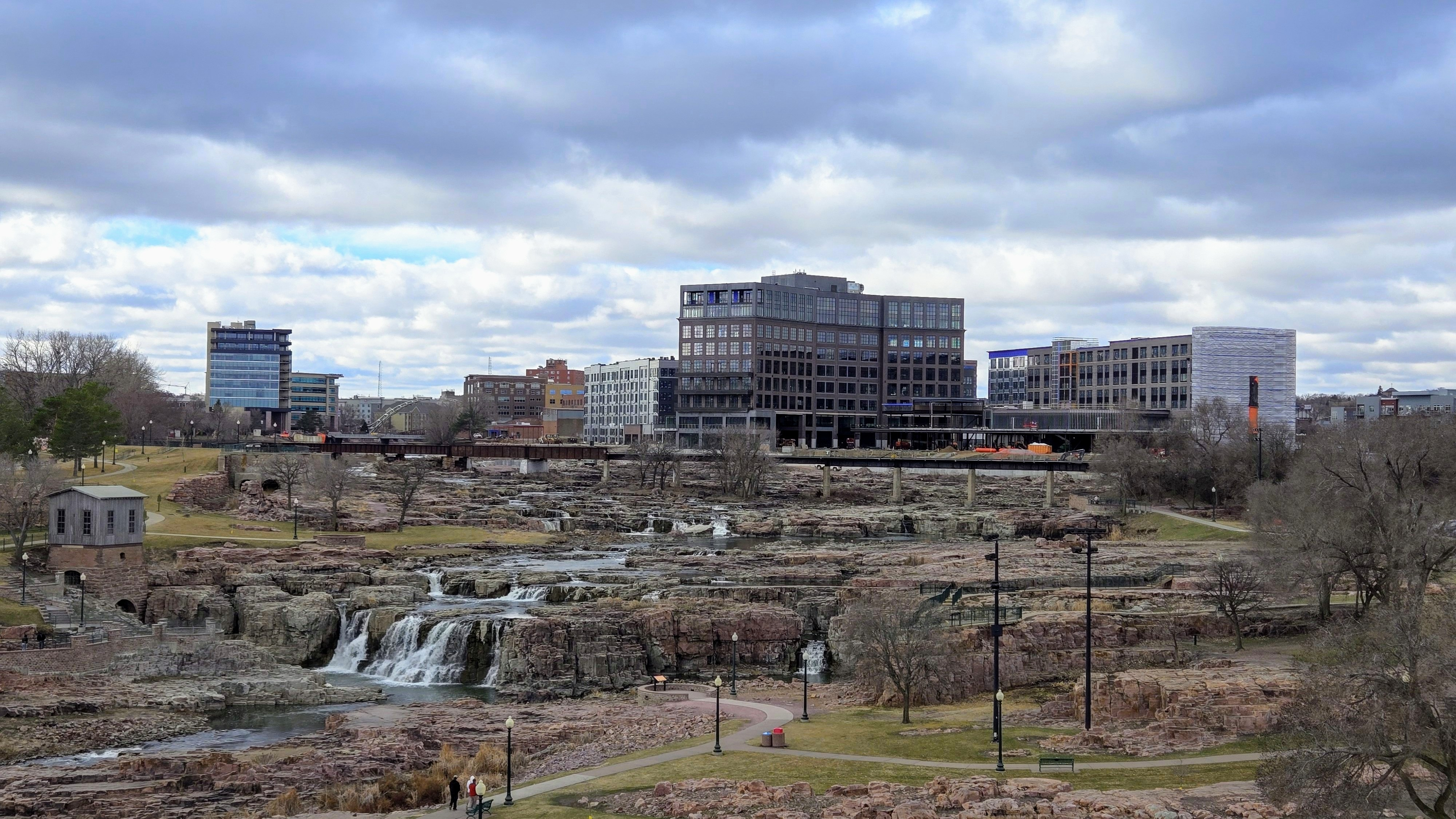
- Sioux Falls skyline as seen from Falls Park
Interactive Map of Sioux Falls, SD–MN CSA
City of Sioux Falls
Sioux Falls, SD–MN MSA
- Country: United States
- State: South Dakota; Minnesota
- Principal city: Sioux Falls
- Time zone: UTC−6 (CST)
  - Summer (DST): UTC−5 (CDT)

The Sioux Falls, SD–MN Metropolitan Statistical Area, as defined by the U.S. Office of Management and Budget, is an area consisting of four counties in South Dakota and one county in Minnesota, anchored by the city of Sioux Falls. The metro area is referred to locally as the Sioux Empire. It is considered a part of the larger area known as Siouxland as it is within the Big Sioux River basin. The MSA had a population of 286,434 at the 2020 census, increasing to an estimated 314,638 by 2025.

== Counties ==
County	State	Seat	2025 estimate	2020 census	Change	Area	Density
Minnehaha	South Dakota	Sioux Falls	212,691	197,214	+7.85%	814 sq mi (2,108 km^{2})	261/sq mi (101/km^{2})
Lincoln	South Dakota	Canton	77,145	65,161	+18.39%	578 sq mi (1,497 km^{2})	133/sq mi (52/km^{2})
Rock	Minnesota	Luverne	9,524	9,704	−1.85%	483 sq mi (1,251 km^{2})	20/sq mi (8/km^{2})
Turner	South Dakota	Parker	9,314	8,673	+7.39%	618 sq mi (1,601 km^{2})	15/sq mi (6/km^{2})
McCook	South Dakota	Salem	5,964	5,682	+4.96%	577 sq mi (1,490 km^{2})	10/sq mi (4/km^{2})
Total			314,638	286,434	+9.85%	3,070 sq mi (7,951 km^{2})	102/sq mi (40/km^{2})

== Communities ==
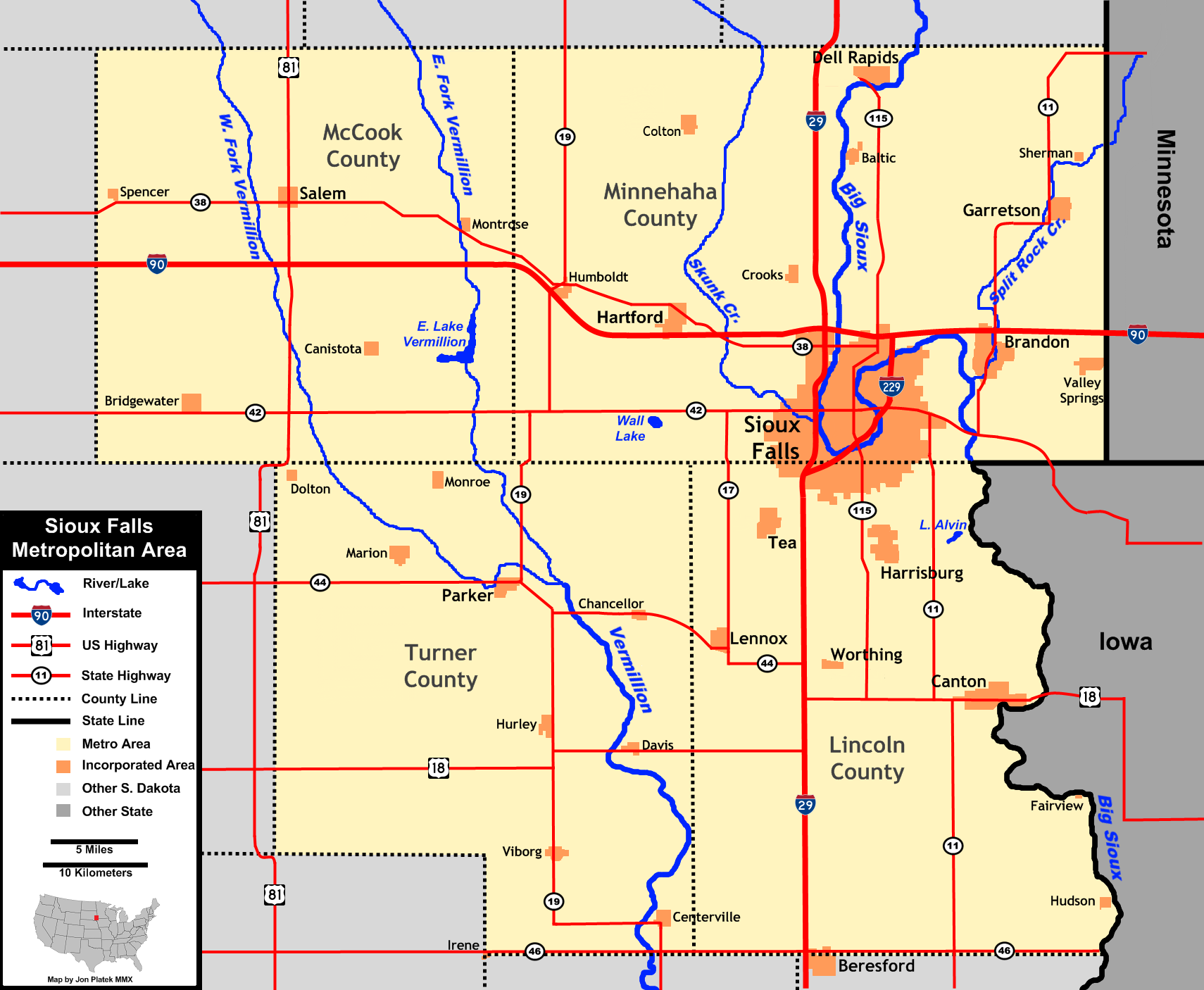
Map of the Sioux Falls Metropolitan Area Prior to 2023 OMB CBSA Definition Update

Historical population
Census	Pop.	Note	%±
1900	23,926		—
1910	29,631		23.8%
1920	42,490		43.4%
1930	50,872		19.7%
1940	57,697		13.4%
1950	70,910		22.9%
1960	118,373		66.9%
1970	139,076		17.5%
1980	139,076		0.0%
1990	153,500		10.4%
2000	187,093		21.9%
2010	228,261		22.0%
2020	276,730		21.2%
U.S. Decennial Census

=== Places with more than 150,000 inhabitants ===
- Sioux Falls (Principal city)

=== Places with 1,000 to 15,000 inhabitants ===
- Beresford (partial)
- Brandon
- Canton
- Crooks
- Dell Rapids
- Garretson
- Harrisburg
- Hartford
- Lennox
- Luverne, MN
- Parker
- Salem
- Tea
- Worthing

=== Places with 500 to 1,000 inhabitants ===
- Baltic
- Bridgewater
- Canistota
- Centerville
- Colton
- Hills, MN
- Humboldt
- Jasper, MN (partial)
- Marion
- Valley Springs
- Viborg

=== Places with fewer than 500 inhabitants ===
- Beaver Creek, MN
- Chancellor
- Davis
- Dolton
- Fairview
- Hardwick, MN
- Hudson
- Hurley
- Irene (partial)
- Kenneth, MN
- Magnolia, MN
- Monroe
- Montrose
- Sherman
- Spencer
- Steen, MN

=== Unincorporated places ===
- Ash Creek, MN
- Benclare
- Booge
- Corson
- Ellis
- Hooker
- Kanaranzi, MN
- Lyons
- Manley, MN
- Moe
- Morefield
- Naomi
- Renner
- Rowena
- Shindler
- Unityville

== Demographics ==
As of the census of 2000, there were 187,093 people, 72,492 households, and 48,282 families residing within the MSA. The racial makeup of the MSA was 94.07% White, 1.25% African American, 1.56% Native American, 0.87% Asian, 0.04% Pacific Islander, 0.87% from other races, and 1.33% from two or more races. Hispanic or Latino of any race were 1.84% of the population.

The median income for a household in the MSA was $40,590, and the median income for a family was $48,191. Males had a median income of $30,994 versus $22,493 for females. The per capita income for the MSA was $19,184.

== See also ==
- South Dakota census statistical areas
