= Ash Creek =

Ash Creek or Ashcreek may refer to:

== Waterways ==
=== In the United States ===
- Ash Creek (Arizona), in Arizona
- Ash Creek (Connecticut), a salt water estuary in Connecticut
- Ash Creek (Minnesota), a tributary of the Rock River
- Ash Creek (Niobrara River tributary), a stream in Rock and Holt Counties, Nebraska
- Ash Creek (Polk County, Oregon), a tributary of the Willamette River
- Ash Creek (California), a tributary of the Pit River
- Ash Creek (Utah), a tributary of the Virgin River

== Communities ==
=== In the United States ===
- Ash Creek Township, Ellsworth County, Kansas, a township in Kansas
- Ash Creek, Minnesota, an unincorporated community in Minnesota
- Ashcreek, Portland, Oregon, a city neighborhood

== Other uses ==
- Ash Creek (meteorite), Meteorite fall in Texas, USA
