= Minnesota State Highway 270 =

State highway in Minnesota, United States

Trunk Highway 270
- MN 270 highlighted in red

Route information
- Maintained by MnDOT
- Length: 7.659 mi (12.326 km)
- Existed: July 1, 1949–present

Major junctions
- West end: CSAH 13 in Hills
- East end: US 75 in Clinton Township

Location
- Country: United States
- State: Minnesota
- Counties: Rock

Highway system
- Minnesota Trunk Highway System; Interstate; US; State; Legislative; Scenic
| ← MN 269 | → MN 271 |

Minnesota State Highway 270 (MN 270) is a 7.659-mile-long (12.326 km) state highway in the southwest corner of Minnesota, which runs from its intersection with County State-Aid Highway 13 (CSAH 13) in the city of Hills, and continues east to its eastern terminus at its intersection with U.S. Highway 75 (US 75) in Clinton Township, eight miles (13 km) south of Luverne.

== Route description ==
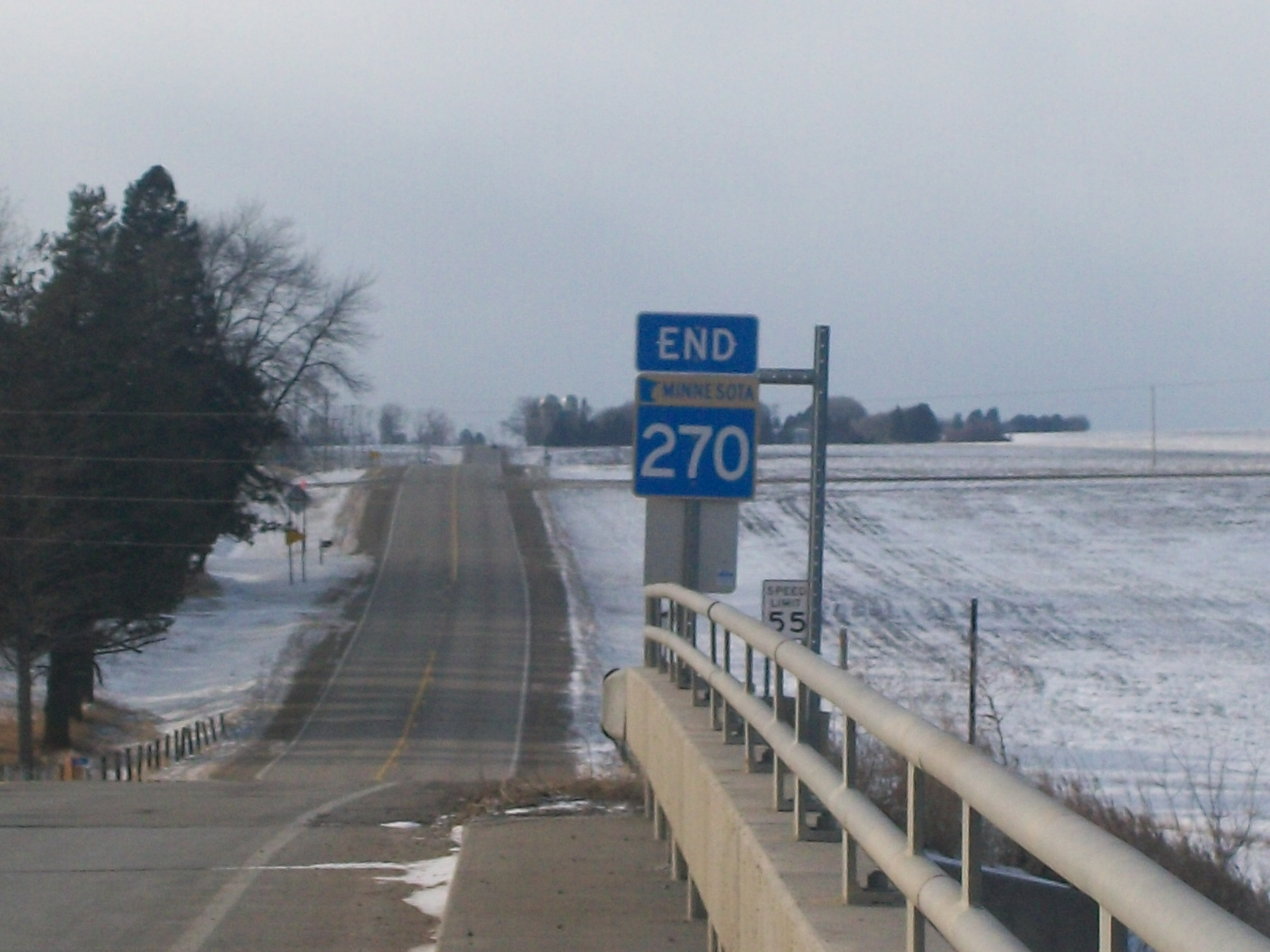
MN 270 at the western city limit of Hills

MN 270 serves as a short east–west connector route in southwest Minnesota between Hills and US 75. Its route follows 1st Street in Hills. The western terminus of Highway 270 at Hills is located approximately four miles (6.4 km) from the South Dakota state line and two miles (3.2 km) from the Iowa state line. The highway is legally defined as Route 270 in the Minnesota Statutes.

== History ==
MN 270 was authorized in 1949. Originally, the highway turned southward along present-day CSAH 11 and back east on a local road to pass through Steen. It was moved to its present direct routing in 1953.

The route was paved in 1954 or 1955.

== Major intersections ==
The entire route is in Rock County.

| Location | mi | km | Destinations | Notes |
|---|---|---|---|---|
| Hills | 0.000 | 0.000 | CSAH 13 | Western terminus at western city limits |
| Clinton Township | 7.659 | 12.326 | US 75 – Luverne | Eastern terminus |
1.000 mi = 1.609 km; 1.000 km = 0.621 mi
