= Ash Creek, Minnesota =

Ash Creek
- Unincorporated community
- Location within Minnesota Location within the United States
- Coordinates: 43°32′18″N 96°11′39″W
- Country: United States
- State: Minnesota
- County: Rock County
- Township: Clinton Township
- Elevation: 1,394 ft (425 m)
- Time zone: UTC-6 (Central (CST))
  - Summer (DST): UTC-5 (CDT)
- Area code: 507
- GNIS feature ID: 639466

Ash Creek is an unincorporated community in Clinton Township, Rock County, Minnesota, United States. The community took its name from nearby Ash Creek, a tributary of the Rock River.

Ash Creek is located one mile east of U.S. Route 75, six miles south of Interstate 90 and three miles north of the Iowa state line.

Nearby places include Luverne, Steen, Kanaranzi, and Hills.

== History ==
The community of Ash Creek was founded by English investor Col. Alfred Grey, who owned the townsite and a large extent of land in southwestern Minnesota. Some of its streets were named in honor of Col. Grey, being named as Colonel, Alfred, and Grey. The community had a post office from 1871 until 1939.

== Politics ==
Ash Creek is located in Minnesota's 1st congressional district, represented by Mankato educator Tim Walz, a Democrat. At the state level, Ash Creek is located in Senate District 22, represented by Republican Bill Weber, and in House District 22A, represented by Republican Joe Schomacker.
