= Kanaranzi =

Kanaranzi may refer to:

- Kanaranzi, Minnesota
- Kanaranzi Township, Rock County, Minnesota
- Kanaranzi Creek
