= Bruce, Minnesota =

Ghost town in Rock County, Minnesota, US

Coordinates: 43°31′20″N 96°23′54″W

Bruce was a town in Rock County, Minnesota, USA. The town has been completely abandoned, and no trace of it remains.

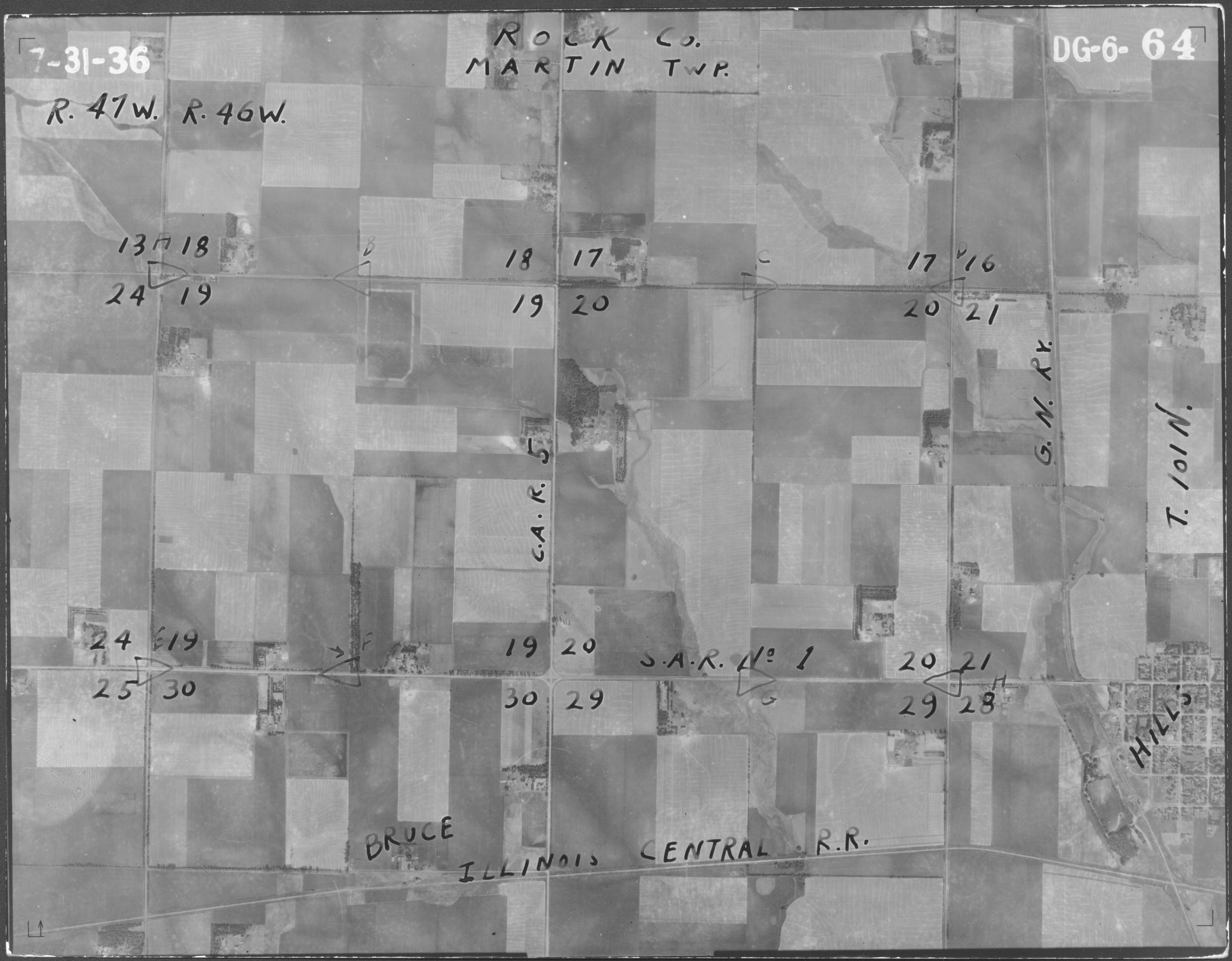
This 1936 aerial USDA photo is the last known photo of Bruce, Minnesota.

== History ==
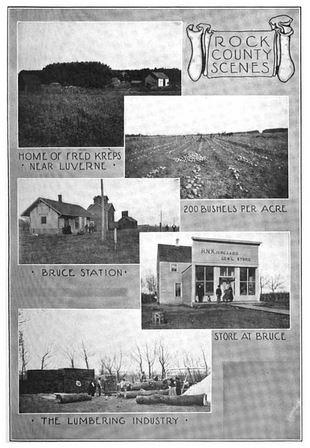
Photos of Bruce, Minnesota, from Arthur Rose's An Illustrated History of Rock County and Pipestone County, Minnesota, Published in 1911.

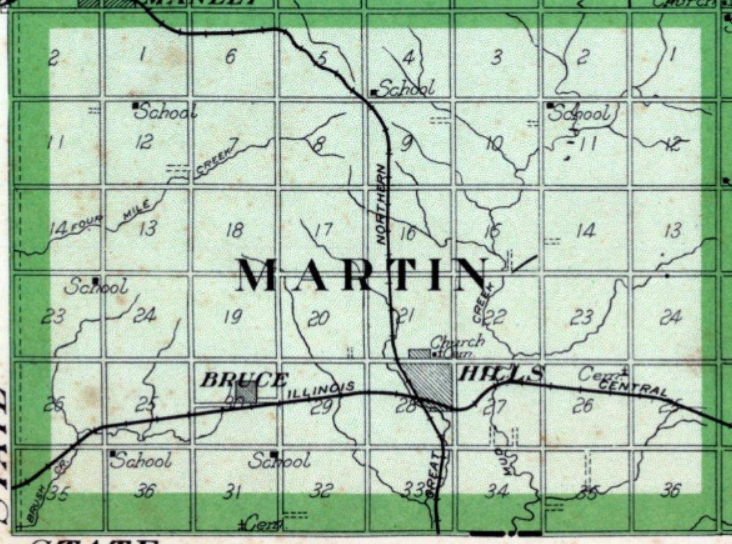
1910 Platt Map of Martin Township, Rock County, Minnesota, showing the former town of Bruce.

The town of Bruce was plotted in May 1888 as a 16-city block town. The originally proposed name was Martin, in honor of Martin Township. When settlers arrived, it was named Bruce, after a railroad official. The town began primarily as the home of a station on the Illinois Central Railroad.

During its first year, the town contained a hotel, a saloon, several stores, and a blacksmith shop, but the boom of activity was short-lived. Most of the town's businesses and residences were relocated a mile and a half east to the town of Hills when the Sioux City and Northern Railroad extended its line from Sioux City, Iowa to Garretson, South Dakota in 1890, bypassing Bruce and creating a rail intersection in Hills. The town faded soon afterwards, though the Post Office opened in 1888 remained in operation until 1936.

A few remaining buildings can be seen in the 1936 U.S. Department of Agriculture's aerial photo above. The last buildings were demolished in the early 1970s and the Illinois Central tracks were removed in 1982. The area, which was once Bruce, Minnesota, is now a farmer's cornfield.
