= Luverne =

Luverne or Lu Verne is the name of several places in the United States:

- Luverne, Alabama
- Luverne, Minnesota
- Luverne, North Dakota
- Luverne Township, Minnesota
- Lu Verne, Iowa

== See also ==
- Luverne (automobile), an early automobile manufacturer
- Luverne Wise (1922–1982), first female American football player
