= Carnegie, Minnesota =

Ghost town in Rock County, Minnesota, US

Coordinates: 43.790683°N 96.311594°W

Carnegie is an abandoned townsite in section 6 of Rose Dell Township in Rock County, Minnesota, United States.

== History ==
Carnegie was a community developed in competition with the town of Jasper. Carnegie failed to attract sufficient investment and development, and as Jasper prospered, Carnegie's residents departed. Today no trace of the community remains.
