= Minnesota State Highway 269 =

State highway in Minnesota, United States

Trunk Highway 269
- MN 269 highlighted in red

Route information
- Maintained by MnDOT
- Length: 2.653 mi (4.270 km)
- Existed: July 1, 1949–present

Major junctions
- West end: SD 11 at Minnesota - South Dakota state line near Jasper
- East end: MN 23 in Jasper

Location
- Country: United States
- State: Minnesota
- Counties: Rock, Pipestone

Highway system
- Minnesota Trunk Highway System; Interstate; US; State; Legislative; Scenic
← MN 267	→ MN 270

Minnesota State Highway 269 (MN 269) is a short 2.653-mile-long (4.270 km) highway in southwest Minnesota, which runs from South Dakota Highway 11 (SD 11) at the South Dakota state line to an intersection with State Highway 23 (MN 23) in the city of Jasper.

== Route description ==
Highway 269 begins at the South Dakota state line as a continuation of SD 11. It runs in rural southwest Minnesota along the Rock–Pipestone county line for most of its length. The highway juts slightly north into Pipestone County after entering the city of Jasper. It ends at an intersection with MN 23, known as Railroad Avenue, in the southern part of Jasper. Highway 269 follows West Wall Street in Jasper, and is also known as 1st Street within Pipestone County.

The route is legally defined as Route 269 in the Minnesota Statutes. No part of the highway is included in the National Highway System, a system of highways important to the nation's defense, economy, and mobility.

== History ==
Highway 269 was authorized on July 1, 1949. The road was paved at the time the route was designated. The highway has remained the same since it was designated.

== Major intersections ==
County	Location	mi	km	Destinations	Notes
Rock–Pipestone county line		0.000	0.000	SD 11 south – Garretson	Continuation into South Dakota
Pipestone	Jasper	2.648	4.262	MN 23 – I-90, Pipestone	Eastern terminus
1.000 mi = 1.609 km; 1.000 km = 0.621 mi
