= Battle Plain Township, Rock County, Minnesota =

Battle Plain Township, Minnesota
- Township
- Location within the state of Minnesota Battle Plain Township, Minnesota (the United States)
- Coordinates: 43°48′9″N 96°7′6″W
- Country: United States
- State: Minnesota
- County: Rock

Area
  - Total: 36.3 sq mi (94.1 km^{2})
  - Land: 36.3 sq mi (94.1 km^{2})
  - Water: 0 sq mi (0.0 km^{2})
- Elevation: 1,526 ft (465 m)

Population (2000)
  - Total: 233
  - Density: 6.5/sq mi (2.5/km^{2})
- Time zone: UTC-6 (Central (CST))
  - Summer (DST): UTC-5 (CDT)
- FIPS code: 27-03988
- GNIS feature ID: 0663523

Battle Plain Township is a township in Rock County, Minnesota, United States. The population was 233 at the 2000 census.

== History ==
Battle Plain Township was originally called Riverside Township, and under the latter name was organized in 1877. The present name, adopted in 1878, commemorates a Native American battle site located there.

== Geography ==
According to the United States Census Bureau, the township has a total area of 36.3 square miles (94 km^{2}), of which 36.3 square miles (94 km^{2}) is land and 0.03% is water.

== Demographics ==
As of the census of 2000, there were 233 people, 78 households, and 64 families residing in the township. The population density was 6.4 inhabitants per square mile (2.5/km^{2}). There were 83 housing units at an average density of 2.3 per square mile (0.89/km^{2}). The racial makeup of the township was 100.00% White.

There were 78 households, out of which 38.5% had children under the age of 18 living with them, 80.8% were married couples living together, and 16.7% were non-families. 15.4% of all households were made up of individuals, and 3.8% had someone living alone who was 65 years of age or older. The average household size was 2.99 and the average family size was 3.34.

In the township the population was spread out, with 33.5% under the age of 18, 6.9% from 18 to 24, 27.5% from 25 to 44, 24.5% from 45 to 64, and 7.7% who were 65 years of age or older. The median age was 36 years. For every 100 females, there were 130.7 males. For every 100 females age 18 and over, there were 118.3 males.

The median income for a household in the township was $38,500, and the median income for a family was $40,833. Males had a median income of $25,781 versus $17,500 for females. The per capita income for the township was $13,693. About 5.4% of families and 8.9% of the population were below the poverty line, including 18.5% of those under the age of eighteen and none of those 65 or over.

== Politics ==
Battle Plain Township is located in Minnesota's 1st congressional district, represented by Mankato educator Tim Walz, a Democrat. At the state level, Battle Plain Township is located in Senate District 22, represented by Republican Doug Magnus, and in House District 22A, represented by Republican Joe Schomacker.
