= Magnolia, Minnesota =

Town in Minnesota, United States

Magnolia
- Town
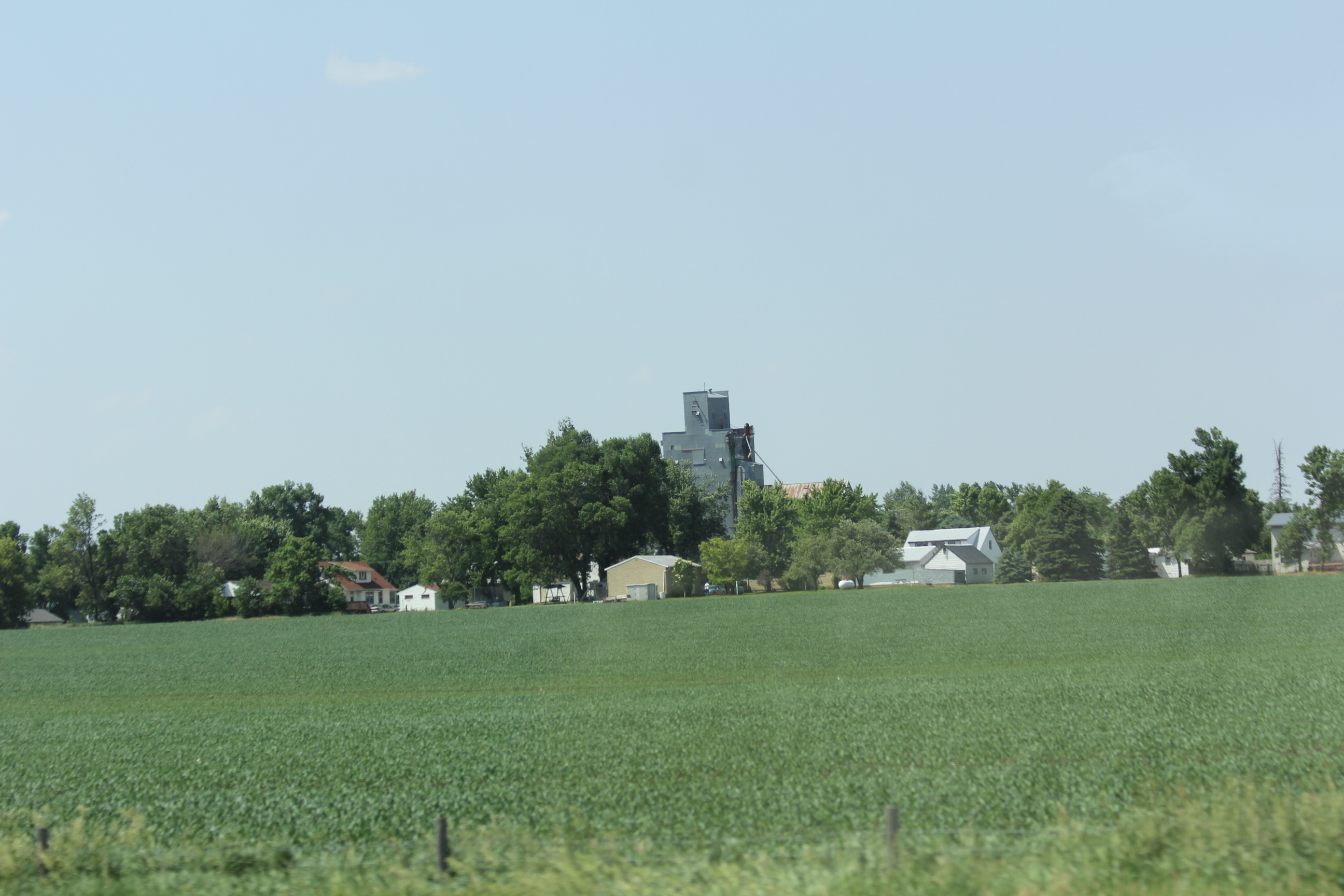
- Buildings in Magnolia

- Location of Magnolia, Minnesota
- Coordinates: 43°38′41″N 96°4′38″W
- Country: United States
- State: Minnesota
- County: Rock

Government
  - Type: Mayor - Council
  - Mayor: Dennis Madison

Area
  - Total: 0.80 sq mi (2.07 km^{2})
  - Land: 0.80 sq mi (2.07 km^{2})
  - Water: 0 sq mi (0.00 km^{2})
- Elevation: 1,529 ft (466 m)

Population (2020)
  - Total: 196
  - Density: 245.6/sq mi (94.83/km^{2})
- Time zone: UTC-6 (Central (CST))
  - Summer (DST): UTC-5 (CDT)
- ZIP code: 56158
- Area code: 507
- FIPS code: 27-39338
- GNIS feature ID: 0647376

Magnolia is a town in Rock County, Minnesota, United States. The population was 222 at the 2010 census. According to the United States Census Bureau, the city has a total area of 0.78 square miles (2.02 km^{2}), all land.

== History ==
Magnolia took its name from Magnolia Township.

A post office has been open in Magnolia since 1886.

Magnolia was platted in 1891 and incorporated in 1894.

== Demographics ==
Historical population
| Census | Pop. | Note | %± |
|---|---|---|---|
| 1900 | 176 | | — |
| 1910 | 189 | | 7.4% |
| 1920 | 219 | | 15.9% |
| 1930 | 240 | | 9.6% |
| 1940 | 273 | | 13.8% |
| 1950 | 260 | | −4.8% |
| 1960 | 280 | | 7.7% |
| 1970 | 233 | | −16.8% |
| 1980 | 234 | | 0.4% |
| 1990 | 155 | | −33.8% |
| 2000 | 221 | | 42.6% |
| 2010 | 222 | | 0.5% |
| 2020 | 196 | | −11.7% |
U.S. Decennial Census

=== 2010 census ===
As of the census of 2010, there were 222 people, 77 households, and 56 families residing in the city. The population density was 284.6 inhabitants per square mile (109.9/km^{2}). There were 84 housing units at an average density of 107.7 per square mile (41.6/km^{2}). The racial makeup of the city was 81.5% White, 1.4% African American, 4.5% Native American, 8.6% Asian, 1.8% from other races, and 2.3% from two or more races. Hispanic or Latino of any race were 2.3% of the population.

There were 77 households, of which 29.9% had children under the age of 18 living with them, 57.1% were married couples living together, 11.7% had a female householder with no husband present, 3.9% had a male householder with no wife present, and 27.3% were non-families. 26.0% of all households were made up of individuals, and 7.8% had someone living alone who was 65 years of age or older. The average household size was 2.49 and the average family size was 2.93.

The median age in the city was 33 years. 30.2% of residents were under the age of 18; 10.5% were between the ages of 18 and 24; 22.2% were from 25 to 44; 26.2% were from 45 to 64; and 11.3% were 65 years of age or older. The gender makeup of the city was 58.6% male and 41.4% female.

=== 2000 census ===
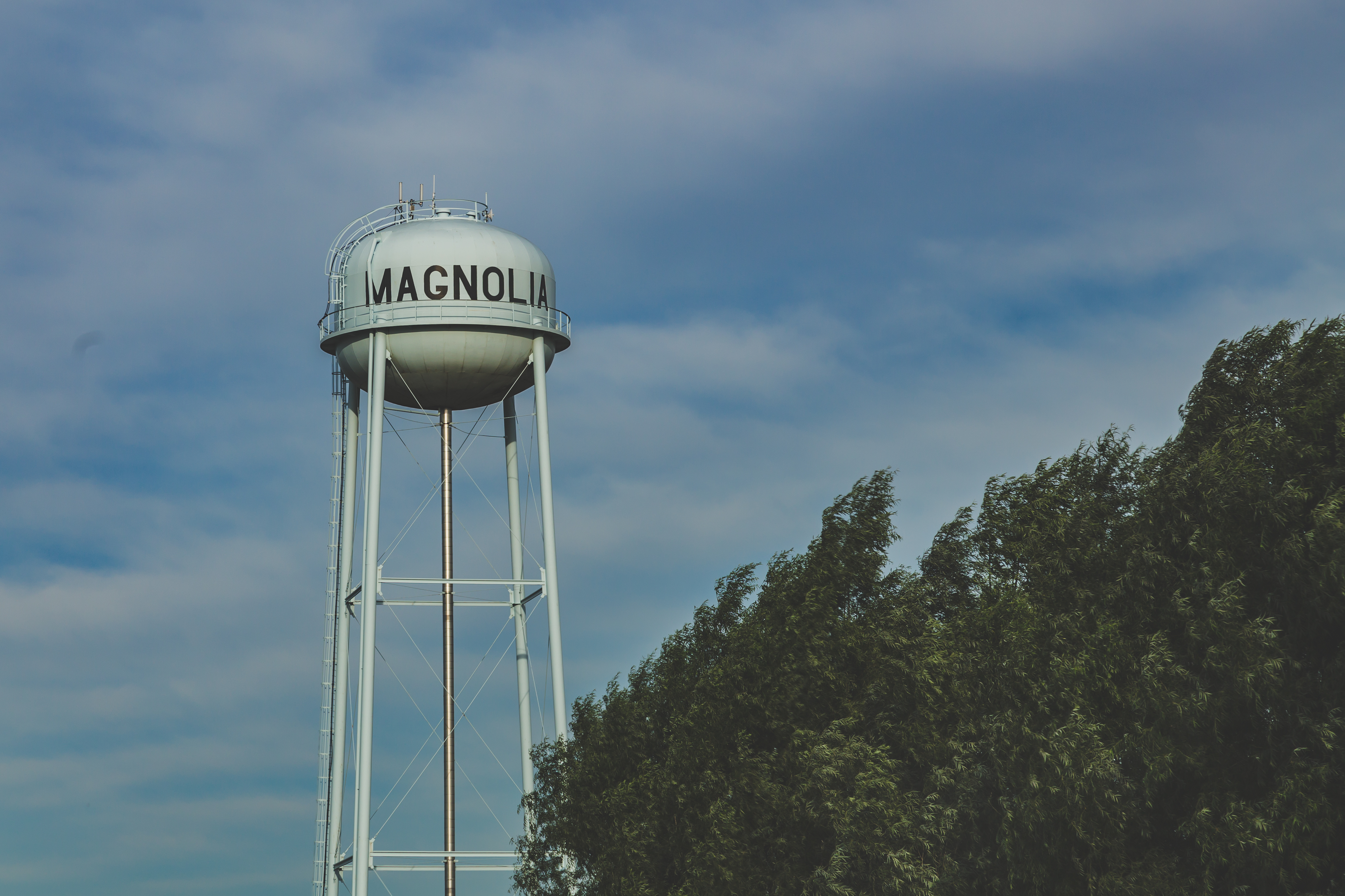
Magnolia's Water Tower

As of the census of 2000, there were 221 people, 79 households, and 57 families residing in the town. The population density was 215.6 inhabitants per square mile (83.2/km^{2}). There were 87 housing units at an average density of 84.9 per square mile (32.8/km^{2}). The racial makeup of the town was 82.81% White, 2.71% African American, 9.50% Asian, 0.45% Pacific Islander, and 4.52% from two or more races. Hispanic or Latino of any race were 4.98% of the population.

There were 79 households, out of which 36.7% had children under the age of 18 living with them, 64.6% were married couples living together, 6.3% had a female householder with no husband present, and 26.6% were non-families. 22.8% of all households were made up of individuals, and 11.4% had someone living alone who was 65 years of age or older. The average household size was 2.80 and the average family size was 3.31.

In the town the population was spread out, with 33.5% under the age of 18, 5.4% from 18 to 24, 28.1% from 25 to 44, 19.5% from 45 to 64, and 13.6% who were 65 years of age or older. The median age was 34 years. For every 100 females, there were 92.2 males. For every 100 females age 18 and over, there were 86.1 males.

The median income for a household in the town was $36,000, and the median income for a family was $36,500. Males had a median income of $30,500 versus $21,875 for females. The per capita income for the town was $13,427. About 5.2% of families and 6.1% of the population were below the poverty line, including 5.7% of those under the age of eighteen and none of those 65 or over.

== Politics ==
Magnolia is located in Minnesota's 1st congressional district, represented by New Ulm agriculturalist Brad Finstad, a Republican. At the state level, Magnolia is located in Senate District 22, represented by Republican Doug Magnus, and in House District 22A, represented by Republican Joe Schomacker.
