= Vienna Township, Rock County, Minnesota =

Vienna Township, Minnesota
- Township
- Location within the state of Minnesota Vienna Township, Minnesota (the United States)
- Coordinates: 43°42′49″N 96°6′9″W
- Country: United States
- State: Minnesota
- County: Rock

Area
  - Total: 34.9 sq mi (90.5 km^{2})
  - Land: 34.9 sq mi (90.5 km^{2})
  - Water: 0 sq mi (0.0 km^{2})
- Elevation: 1,496 ft (456 m)

Population (2000)
  - Total: 183
  - Density: 5.2/sq mi (2/km^{2})
- Time zone: UTC-6 (Central (CST))
  - Summer (DST): UTC-5 (CDT)
- FIPS code: 27-67072
- GNIS feature ID: 0665871

Vienna Township is a township in Rock County, Minnesota, United States. The population was 183 at the 2000 census.

== History ==
Vienna Township was organized in 1874, and named after Vienna, the capital of Austria.

== Geography ==
According to the United States Census Bureau, the township has a total area of 35.0 square miles (90.5 km^{2}), all land.

== Demographics ==
As of the census of 2000, there were 183 people, 68 households, and 49 families residing in the township. The population density was 5.2 people per square mile (2.0/km^{2}). There were 70 housing units at an average density of 2.0/sq mi (0.8/km^{2}). The racial makeup of the township was 95.63% White, 3.83% from other races, and 0.55% from two or more races. Hispanic or Latino of any race were 4.37% of the population.

There were 68 households, out of which 32.4% had children under the age of 18 living with them, 67.6% were married couples living together, 1.5% had a female householder with no husband present, and 26.5% were non-families. 20.6% of all households were made up of individuals, and 10.3% had someone living alone who was 65 years of age or older. The average household size was 2.69 and the average family size was 3.10.

In the township the population was spread out, with 28.4% under the age of 18, 6.6% from 18 to 24, 25.7% from 25 to 44, 25.7% from 45 to 64, and 13.7% who were 65 years of age or older. The median age was 40 years. For every 100 females, there were 110.3 males. For every 100 females age 18 and over, there were 104.7 males.

The median income for a household in the township was $30,714, and the median income for a family was $31,500. Males had a median income of $26,094 versus $22,500 for females. The per capita income for the township was $17,078. About 16.7% of families and 19.9% of the population were below the poverty line, including 37.2% of those under the age of eighteen and 10.0% of those 65 or over.

== Politics ==
Vienna Township is located in Minnesota's 1st congressional district, represented by Mankato educator Tim Walz, a Democrat. At the state level, Vienna Township is located in Senate District 22, represented by Republican Doug Magnus, and in House District 22A, represented by Republican Joe Schomacker.
