= John W. Turner (Dakota Territory politician) =

American politician

John W. Turner (1800–1883) was an American politician.

Turner was born February 28, 1800, in Oneida County, New York.

Turner served in the Dakota Territorial Council from 1865 to 1867 and 1870 to 1871. Then he served in the Dakota Territorial House of Representatives from 1864 to 1865 and 1872 to 1863. He served from Clay and Turner Counties, Dakota Territory. Turner County, South Dakota, was named after Turner.

Turner died April 12, 1883, Turner County, South Dakota.
