= Ash Creek (Minnesota) =

Stream in Rock County, Minnesota, U.S.

Coordinates: 43°32′28.14″N 96°11′14.5″W

Ash Creek is a stream in Rock County, Minnesota, in the United States. It is a tributary of the Rock River.

Ash Creek was named from the white ash trees lining its banks.

== See also ==
- List of rivers of Minnesota
