= Turner County, South Dakota =

County in South Dakota, United States

- County
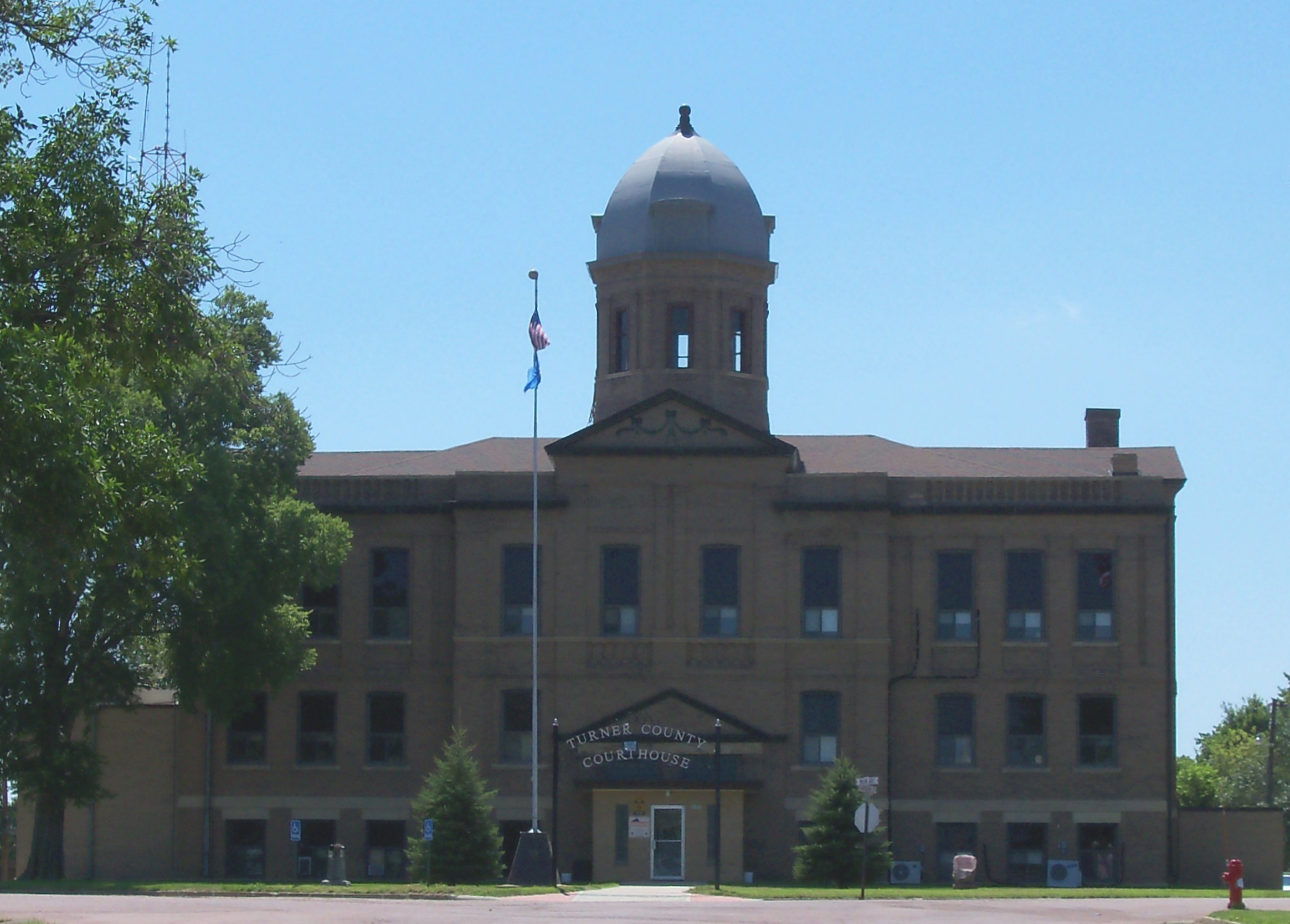
- Turner County Courthouse in Parker

- Location within the U.S. state of South Dakota
- Coordinates: 43°19′N 97°09′W
- Country: United States
- State: South Dakota
- Founded: 1871
- Named for: John W. Turner
- Seat: Parker
- Largest city: Parker

Area
  - Total: 618 sq mi (1,600 km^{2})
  - Land: 617 sq mi (1,600 km^{2})
  - Water: 0.6 sq mi (1.6 km^{2}) 0.1%

Population (2020)
  - Total: 8,673
  - Estimate (2025): 9,314 ▲
  - Density: 15/sq mi (5.8/km^{2})
- Time zone: UTC−6 (Central)
  - Summer (DST): UTC−5 (CDT)
- Congressional district: At-large
- Website: turner.sdcounties.org

Turner County is a county in the U.S. state of South Dakota. As of the 2020 census, the population was 8,673. Its county seat is Parker. The county was established in 1871, and was named for Dakota Territory official John W. Turner.

Turner County is a part of the Sioux Falls metropolitan area.

== Geography ==
The terrain of Turner County consists of rolling hills, carved by gullies and drainages. The area is largely devoted to agriculture. The terrain slopes to the south and east; its highest point is along its west boundary line, at 1,578 ft (481 m) ASL. The county has a total area of 618 square miles (1,600 km^{2}), of which 617 square miles (1,600 km^{2}) is land and 0.6 square miles (1.6 km^{2}) (0.1%) is water.

=== Major highways ===
- U.S. Highway 18
- U.S. Highway 81
- South Dakota Highway 19
- South Dakota Highway 44
- South Dakota Highway 46
- South Dakota Highway 19A

=== Adjacent counties ===
- Minnehaha County – northeast
- Lincoln County – east
- Clay County – southeast
- Yankton County – southwest
- Hutchinson County – west
- McCook County – northwest

=== Protected areas ===
- Miller Waterfowl Production Area
- Peterson Waterfowl Production Area
- Plucker Waterfowl Production Area

=== Lakes ===
- Mud Lake
- Swan Lake

== Demographics ==
Historical population
Census	Pop.	Note	%±
1880	5,320		—
1890	10,256		92.8%
1900	13,175		28.5%
1910	13,840		5.0%
1920	14,871		7.4%
1930	14,891		0.1%
1940	13,270		−10.9%
1950	12,100		−8.8%
1960	11,159		−7.8%
1970	9,872		−11.5%
1980	9,255		−6.2%
1990	8,576		−7.3%
2000	8,849		3.2%
2010	8,347		−5.7%
2020	8,673		3.9%
2025 (est.)	9,314	▲	7.4%
U.S. Decennial Census

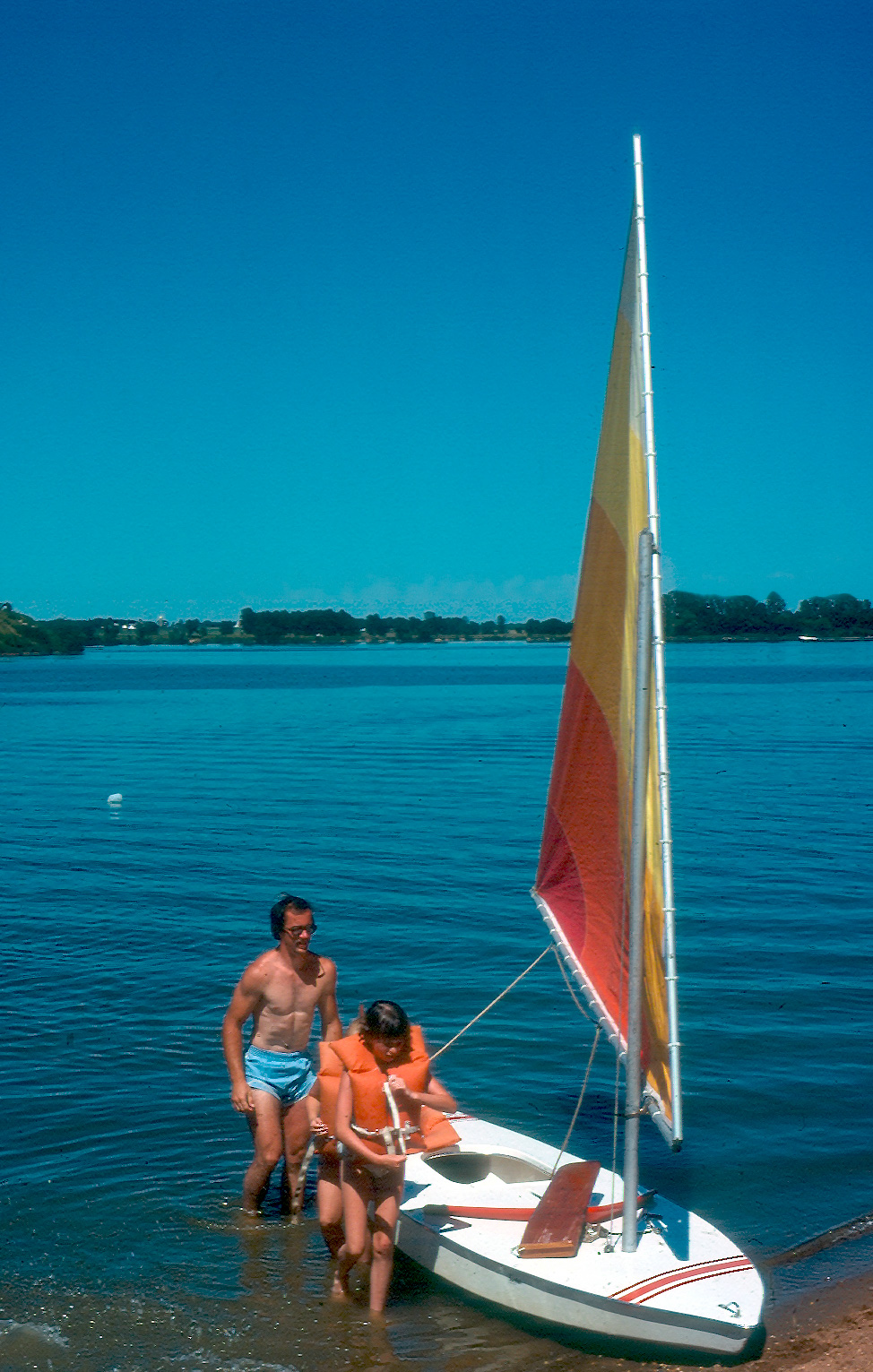
Swan Lake northwest of Viborg

=== 2020 census ===
As of the 2020 census, there were 8,673 people, 3,467 households, and 2,359 families residing in the county. The population density was 14.1 inhabitants per square mile (5.4/km^{2}).

Of the residents, 26.1% were under the age of 18 and 21.2% were 65 years of age or older; the median age was 42.0 years. For every 100 females there were 101.2 males, and for every 100 females age 18 and over there were 101.5 males.

The racial makeup of the county was 93.5% White, 0.4% Black or African American, 0.7% American Indian and Alaska Native, 0.2% Asian, 1.3% from some other race, and 4.0% from two or more races. Hispanic or Latino residents of any race comprised 2.9% of the population.

Of the 3,467 households, 30.9% had children under the age of 18 living with them and 19.0% had a female householder with no spouse or partner present. About 28.0% of all households were made up of individuals and 14.7% had someone living alone who was 65 years of age or older.

There were 3,871 housing units, of which 10.4% were vacant. Among occupied housing units, 81.0% were owner-occupied and 19.0% were renter-occupied. The homeowner vacancy rate was 1.8% and the rental vacancy rate was 8.4%.

=== 2010 census ===
As of the 2010 census, there were 8,347 people, 3,452 households, and 2,363 families in the county. The population density was 13.5 inhabitants per square mile (5.2/km^{2}). There were 3,939 housing units at an average density of 6.4 units per square mile (2.5 units/km^{2}). The racial makeup of the county was 97.5% white, 0.8% American Indian, 0.2% black or African American, 0.2% Asian, 0.3% from other races, and 0.9% from two or more races. Those of Hispanic or Latino origin made up 1.3% of the population. In terms of ancestry, 47.7% were German, 18.4% were Norwegian, 11.3% were Danish, 9.4% were Irish, 8.5% were Dutch, and 2.7% were American.

Of the 3,452 households, 29.0% had children under the age of 18 living with them, 58.7% were married couples living together, 5.9% had a female householder with no husband present, 31.5% were non-families, and 27.4% of all households were made up of individuals. The average household size was 2.37 and the average family size was 2.87. The median age was 43.7 years.

The median income for a household in the county was $48,068 and the median income for a family was $57,881. Males had a median income of $37,622 versus $27,459 for females. The per capita income for the county was $22,871. About 4.7% of families and 7.7% of the population were below the poverty line, including 8.9% of those under age 18 and 9.1% of those age 65 or over.

== Culture ==
Turner County hosts the oldest county fair in the Dakotas. It held its first fair on October 13–16, 1880. The Turner County Agriculture Society was organized in March 1880. Its stated purpose was to showcase the agricultural successes of the new county. The fair was held at various locations over the years, but has been at its current location east of Parker for well over half a century.

== Communities ==
=== Cities ===
- Centerville
- Hurley
- Irene (partial)
- Marion
- Parker (county seat)
- Viborg

=== Towns ===
- Chancellor
- Davis
- Dolton
- Monroe

=== Census-designated place ===
- Cameron Colony

=== Unincorporated communities ===
- Hooker
- Naomi
- Turkey Ridge

=== Townships ===
- Brothersfield
- Centerville
- Childstown
- Daneville
- Dolton
- Germantown
- Home
- Hurley
- Marion
- Middleton
- Monroe
- Norway
- Parker
- Rosefield
- Salem
- Spring Valley
- Swan Lake
- Turner

== Politics ==
Turner County voters are reliably Republican. In no national election since 1932 has the county selected the Democratic Party candidate.

United States presidential election results for Turner County, South Dakota
Year	Republican		Democratic		Third party(ies)	
Year	No.	%	No.	%	No.	%
1892	1,108	56.68%	429	21.94%	418	21.38%
1896	1,616	62.47%	950	36.72%	21	0.81%
1900	1,977	68.22%	871	30.06%	50	1.73%
1904	2,395	79.07%	521	17.20%	113	3.73%
1908	1,792	66.17%	793	29.28%	123	4.54%
1912	0	0.00%	906	34.67%	1,707	65.33%
1916	1,573	56.93%	1,134	41.04%	56	2.03%
1920	2,703	67.59%	604	15.10%	692	17.30%
1924	1,708	45.93%	285	7.66%	1,726	46.41%
1928	3,362	70.65%	1,380	29.00%	17	0.36%
1932	2,172	40.19%	3,170	58.65%	63	1.17%
1936	3,214	49.25%	2,923	44.79%	389	5.96%
1940	4,644	72.36%	1,774	27.64%	0	0.00%
1944	3,549	73.13%	1,304	26.87%	0	0.00%
1948	3,048	66.26%	1,514	32.91%	38	0.83%
1952	4,604	82.39%	984	17.61%	0	0.00%
1956	4,096	70.89%	1,682	29.11%	0	0.00%
1960	4,120	72.70%	1,547	27.30%	0	0.00%
1964	2,846	56.58%	2,184	43.42%	0	0.00%
1968	3,246	67.61%	1,350	28.12%	205	4.27%
1972	3,007	60.02%	1,993	39.78%	10	0.20%
1976	2,694	58.34%	1,906	41.27%	18	0.39%
1980	3,343	66.43%	1,369	27.21%	320	6.36%
1984	3,086	67.20%	1,486	32.36%	20	0.44%
1988	2,436	57.47%	1,780	41.99%	23	0.54%
1992	1,906	44.43%	1,507	35.13%	877	20.44%
1996	1,970	48.63%	1,682	41.52%	399	9.85%
2000	2,514	62.79%	1,414	35.31%	76	1.90%
2004	3,084	63.80%	1,646	34.05%	104	2.15%
2008	2,538	58.32%	1,681	38.63%	133	3.06%
2012	2,715	64.49%	1,411	33.52%	84	2.00%
2016	2,937	70.77%	961	23.16%	252	6.07%
2020	3,290	72.34%	1,139	25.04%	119	2.62%
2024	3,374	74.35%	1,044	23.01%	120	2.64%

== Education ==
School districts include:

- Centerville School District 60-1
- Freeman School District 33-1
- Irene-Wakonda School District 13-3
- Lennox School District 41-4
- Marion School District 60-3
- Menno School District 33-2
- Parker School District 60-4
- Viborg Hurley School District 60-6

Former school districts:

- Hurley School District 60-2. - Merged into Viborg Hurley in 2013.
- Viborg School District 60-5. - Merged into Viborg Hurley in 2013.

== See also ==
- National Register of Historic Places listings in Turner County, South Dakota
