= Magnolia Township, Rock County, Minnesota =

Magnolia Township, Minnesota
- Township
- Location within the state of Minnesota Magnolia Township, Minnesota (the United States)
- Coordinates: 43°38′3″N 96°6′14″W
- Country: United States
- State: Minnesota
- County: Rock

Area
  - Total: 35.1 sq mi (90.8 km^{2})
  - Land: 35.1 sq mi (90.8 km^{2})
  - Water: 0 sq mi (0.0 km^{2})
- Elevation: 1,453 ft (443 m)

Population (2000)
  - Total: 250
  - Density: 7.3/sq mi (2.8/km^{2})
- Time zone: UTC-6 (Central (CST))
  - Summer (DST): UTC-5 (CDT)
- ZIP code: 56158
- Area code: 507
- FIPS code: 27-39356
- GNIS feature ID: 0664874

Magnolia Township is a township in Rock County, Minnesota, United States. The population was 250 at the 2000 census.

== History ==
Magnolia Township was organized in 1872. The township was named after Magnolia, Wisconsin.

== Geography ==
According to the United States Census Bureau, the township has a total area of 35.1 square miles (90.8 km^{2}), all land.

== Demographics ==
As of the census of 2000, there were 250 people, 92 households, and 65 families residing in the township. The population density was 7.1 inhabitants per square mile (2.7/km^{2}). There were 94 housing units at an average density of 2.7 per square mile (1.0/km^{2}). The racial makeup of the township was 95.60% White, 1.60% African American, 1.20% Asian, and 1.60% from two or more races. Hispanic or Latino of any race were 0.80% of the population.

There were 92 households, out of which 39.1% had children under the age of 18 living with them, 65.2% were married couples living together, 2.2% had a female householder with no husband present, and 29.3% were non-families. 25.0% of all households were made up of individuals, and 7.6% had someone living alone who was 65 years of age or older. The average household size was 2.72 and the average family size was 3.29.

In the township the population was spread out, with 29.2% under the age of 18, 8.4% from 18 to 24, 27.6% from 25 to 44, 24.0% from 45 to 64, and 10.8% who were 65 years of age or older. The median age was 34 years. For every 100 females, there were 135.8 males. For every 100 females age 18 and over, there were 124.1 males.

The median income for a household in the township was $43,250, and the median income for a family was $49,000. Males had a median income of $26,771 versus $22,500 for females. The per capita income for the township was $16,452. About 1.8% of families and 5.5% of the population were below the poverty line, including 4.6% of those under the age of eighteen and none of those 65 or over.

== Politics ==
Magnolia Township is located in Minnesota's 1st congressional district, represented by Mankato educator Tim Walz, a Democrat. At the state level, Magnolia Township is located in Senate District 22, represented by Republican Doug Magnus, and in House District 22A, represented by Republican Joe Schomacker.
