= Martin Township, Rock County, Minnesota =

Martin Township, Minnesota
- Township
- Location within the state of Minnesota Martin Township, Minnesota (the United States)
- Coordinates: 43°32′57″N 96°22′11″W
- Country: United States
- State: Minnesota
- County: Rock

Area
  - Total: 48.0 sq mi (124.4 km^{2})
  - Land: 48.0 sq mi (124.4 km^{2})
  - Water: 0 sq mi (0.0 km^{2})
- Elevation: 1,480 ft (451 m)

Population (2000)
  - Total: 451
  - Density: 9.3/sq mi (3.6/km^{2})
- Time zone: UTC-6 (Central (CST))
  - Summer (DST): UTC-5 (CDT)
- FIPS code: 27-40796
- GNIS feature ID: 0664923

Martin Township is a township in Rock County, Minnesota, United States. The population was 451 at the 2000 census.

Martin Township was organized in 1873, and named in honor of John Martin, a pioneer settler.

== Geography ==
According to the United States Census Bureau, the township has a total area of 48.0 square miles (124.4 km^{2}), of which 48.0 square miles (124.4 km^{2}) is land and 0.02% is water.

== Demographics ==
As of the census of 2000, there were 451 people, 148 households, and 129 families residing in the township. The population density was 9.4 inhabitants per square mile (3.6/km^{2}). There were 154 housing units at an average density of 3.2 per square mile (1.2/km^{2}). The racial makeup of the township was 97.78% White, 0.22% Asian, 1.33% from other races, and 0.67% from two or more races. Hispanic or Latino of any race were 1.77% of the population.

There were 148 households, out of which 44.6% had children under the age of 18 living with them, 80.4% were married couples living together, 3.4% had a female householder with no husband present, and 12.8% were non-families. 10.8% of all households were made up of individuals, and 3.4% had someone living alone who was 65 years of age or older. The average household size was 3.05 and the average family size was 3.29.

In the township the population was spread out, with 32.6% under the age of 18, 7.1% from 18 to 24, 28.2% from 25 to 44, 22.4% from 45 to 64, and 9.8% who were 65 years of age or older. The median age was 36 years. For every 100 females, there were 109.8 males. For every 100 females age 18 and over, there were 106.8 males.

The median income for a household in the township was $46,964, and the median income for a family was $49,583. Males had a median income of $29,000 versus $21,071 for females. The per capita income for the township was $15,635. About 4.8% of families and 6.1% of the population were below the poverty line, including 6.9% of those under age 18 and 11.8% of those age 65 or over.

== Politics ==
Martin Township is located in Minnesota's 1st congressional district, represented by Mankato educator Tim Walz, a Democrat. At the state level, Martin Township is located in Senate District 22, represented by Republican Doug Magnus, and in House District 22A, represented by Republican Joe Schomacker.
