= Dolton, South Dakota =

- Town
- Location in Turner County and the state of South Dakota
- Coordinates: 43°29′28″N 97°23′05″W
- Country: United States
- State: South Dakota
- County: Turner
- <-- Incorporated (town) -->: 1909

Area
  - Total: 0.25 sq mi (0.66 km^{2})
  - Land: 0.25 sq mi (0.66 km^{2})
  - Water: 0 sq mi (0.00 km^{2})
- Elevation: 1,447 ft (441 m)

Population (2020)
  - Total: 34
  - Density: 132.8/sq mi (51.29/km^{2})
- Time zone: UTC-6 (Central (CST))
  - Summer (DST): UTC-5 (CDT)
- Area code: 605
- FIPS code: 46-16860
- GNIS feature ID: 1267356

Dolton is a town in northwestern Turner County, South Dakota, United States. The population was 34 at the 2020 census.

== History ==
Dolton was named for a founding member of the town company.

== Geography ==
According to the United States Census Bureau, the town has a total area of 0.26 square miles (0.67 km^{2}), all land.

== Demographics ==
Historical population
Census	Pop.	Note	%±
1910	147		—
1920	147		0.0%
1930	124		−15.6%
1940	121		−2.4%
1950	93		−23.1%
1960	71		−23.7%
1970	60		−15.5%
1980	47		−21.7%
1990	43		−8.5%
2000	41		−4.7%
2010	37		−9.8%
2020	34		−8.1%
U.S. Decennial Census

=== 2010 census ===
As of the census of 2010, there were 37 people, 18 households, and 8 families residing in the town. The population density was 142.3 inhabitants per square mile (54.9/km^{2}). There were 22 housing units at an average density of 84.6 per square mile (32.7/km^{2}). The racial makeup of the town was 86.5% White, 2.7% from other races, and 10.8% from two or more races. Hispanic or Latino of any race were 2.7% of the population.

There were 18 households, of which 16.7% had children under the age of 18 living with them, 33.3% were married couples living together, 11.1% had a female householder with no husband present, and 55.6% were non-families. 44.4% of all households were made up of individuals, and 11.1% had someone living alone who was 65 years of age or older. The average household size was 2.06 and the average family size was 2.63.

The median age in the town was 49.8 years. 21.6% of residents were under the age of 18; 8.1% were between the ages of 18 and 24; 10.8% were from 25 to 44; 48.6% were from 45 to 64; and 10.8% were 65 years of age or older. The gender makeup of the town was 56.8% male and 43.2% female.

=== 2000 census ===
As of the census of 2000, there were 41 people, 18 households, and 12 families residing in the town. The population density was 162.1 inhabitants per square mile (62.6/km^{2}). There were 26 housing units at an average density of 102.8 per square mile (39.7/km^{2}). The racial makeup of the town was 100.00% White.

There were 18 households, out of which 11.1% had children under the age of 18 living with them, 50.0% were married couples living together, and 33.3% were non-families. 27.8% of all households were made up of individuals, and 5.6% had someone living alone who was 65 years of age or older. The average household size was 2.28 and the average family size was 2.83.

In the town, the population was spread out, with 14.6% under the age of 18, 4.9% from 18 to 24, 26.8% from 25 to 44, 39.0% from 45 to 64, and 14.6% who were 65 years of age or older. The median age was 48 years. For every 100 females, there were 156.3 males. For every 100 females age 18 and over, there were 169.2 males.

The median income for a household in the town was $24,688, and the median income for a family was $24,063. Males had a median income of $34,375 versus $11,250 for females. The per capita income for the town was $12,833. None of the population or families were below the poverty line.
