= Rock River (Big Sioux River tributary) =

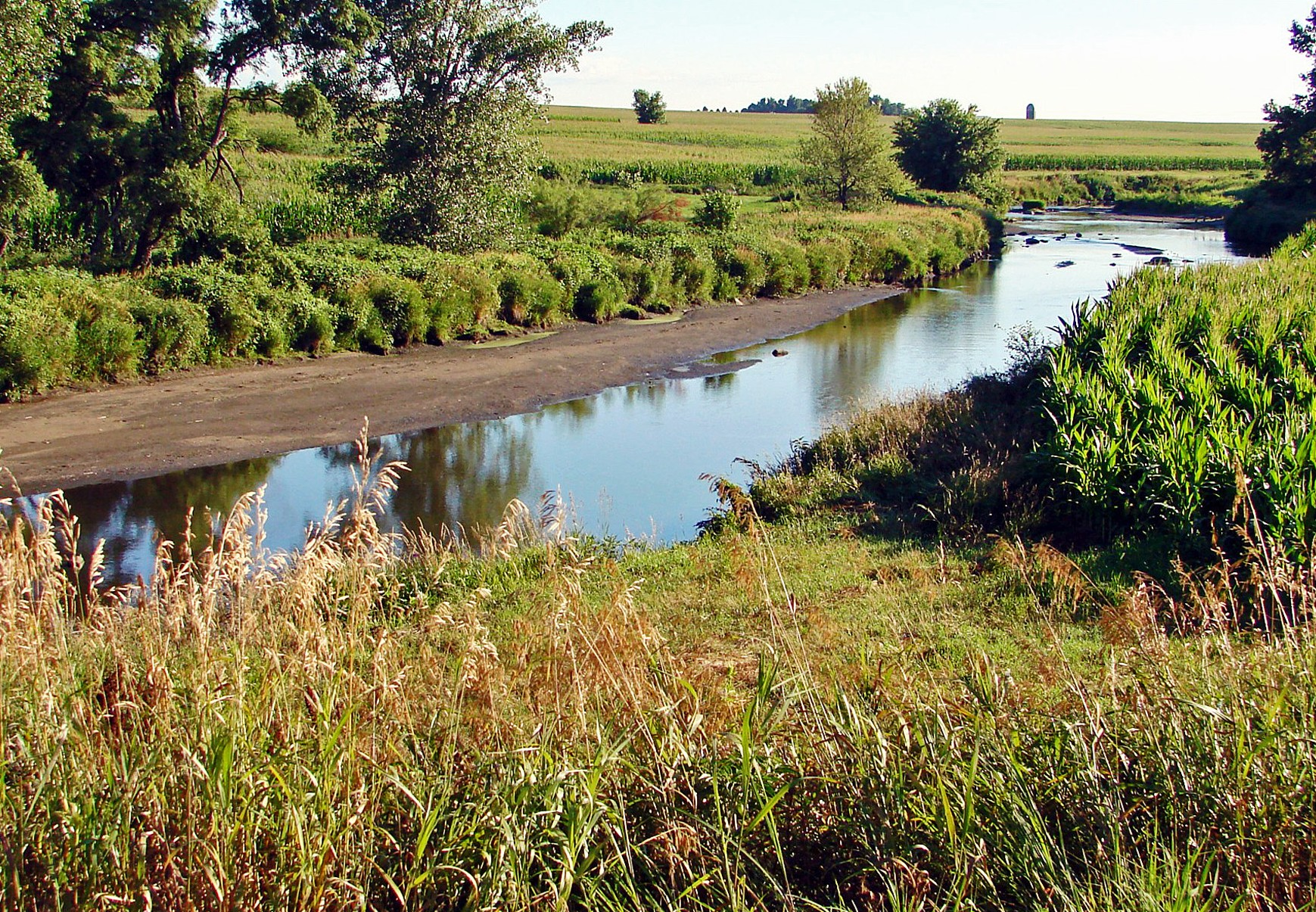

- Mouth
- Native name: Íƞyaƞ Ḣeyaka Wakpa (Dakota)

Location
- Country: United States
- State: Iowa, Minnesota
- District: Sioux County, Iowa, Lyon County, Iowa, Rock County, Minnesota, Pipestone County, Minnesota

Physical characteristics
- Source
  - coordinates: 44°08′13″N 96°07′23″W
- Mouth: Big Sioux River
  - coordinates: 43°04′58″N 96°27′16″W
  - elevation: 1,168 ft (356 m)
- Discharge
  - location: Rock Valley, Iowa
  - average: 610 cu/ft. per sec.

Basin features
- Tributaries
  - left: Champepadan Creek

The Rock River is a tributary of the Big Sioux River, about 144 miles (232 km) long, in southwestern Minnesota and northwestern Iowa in the United States. Via the Big Sioux and Missouri rivers, it is part of the watershed of the Mississippi River. The river's name comes from a prominent rocky outcrop about 175 feet high (designated "The Rock" on Joseph Nicollet's 1843 map of the area) of reddish-gray Sioux Quartzite, about 3 miles (5 km) north of Luverne. The name is a translation of an older Dakota name Íƞyaƞ Ḣeyaka Wakpa, which Nicollet translates as "River of the Rock" but which could also be translated as "Rocky Hills River". The outcrop of quartzite is contained in Minnesota's Blue Mounds State Park.

== Course ==
The Rock River starts in Pipestone County, Minnesota, approximately 13 miles (21 km) northeast of the town of Pipestone, and flows initially southwardly through Rock County, Minnesota, and Lyon County, Iowa, where it turns southwestward into Sioux County, Iowa. It flows into the Big Sioux River in Sioux County, 6 miles (10 km) north of Hawarden.

Along its course the Rock River passes the towns of Holland, Edgerton, Luverne and Ash Creek in Minnesota; and the towns of Rock Rapids, Doon and Rock Valley in Iowa.

== Tributaries ==
In its upper course in Minnesota, the river collects the East Branch Rock River, about 15 miles (24 km) long, which flows for its entire length in Pipestone County. In Iowa, it collects the Little Rock River just south of Doon.

== See also ==
- List of Iowa rivers
- List of Minnesota rivers
- List of longest streams of Minnesota
- Rock River (for other Rock Rivers)
