= Luverne Wise =

American football player (1922–1982)

No. 0
- Positions: Placekicker, quarterback

Personal information
- Born: March 30, 1922; Atmore, Alabama
- Died: July 18, 1982 (aged 60); Oak Hill, Alabama
- Listed height: 5 ft 5 in (1.65 m)
- Listed weight: 113 lb (51 kg)

Career information
- High school: Atmore (AL) (1939–1940)
- College: none

Awards and highlights
- Honorable mention all-state (1940); Atmore Area Hall of Fame (2011)

Luverne Nora Wise Albert (March 30, 1922 – July 18, 1982) was an American football placekicker and quarterback for Atmore High School who was the first female player to score on a men's team. She was the team's backup kicker in the 1939 and 1940 seasons, and made extra points "after the team was up by 20 points." She also occasionally played quarterback, and was named honorable mention all-state as a senior.

== Early life ==
Luverne Wise was born on March 30, 1922, in Atmore, Alabama, to Walter and Ida Wise. She attended Atmore High School (now known as Escambia County High School) there. In 1939, as a high school junior, Wise and some of her friends asked football coach Andy Edington for a tryout, complaining that they didn't have much to do. "It more or less started out as a joke," she later said. "We were complaining that girls didn't have anything to do so we were going to go out for football. Coach Andy Edington dared us." Edington told them that nothing in the rules could prevent them from trying out and four did.

When Edington noticed Wise had kicking skills, he thought to train her to make extra points, and people would want to watch the school's games. "It was the end of the Great Depression, so packing the stadium was a real big plus," Edington said.

"We dressed her in a cute little ballet skirt. The only requirement in the rule book about equipment pertained to head gear, so we got a helmet and cut holes in it so her curls would come out," he said. "Then we had only one problem. I had a boy that just didn’t miss extra points. She would miss now and then. What we agreed to do was that every time we would be 20 points ahead, she would go in. So our team went wild to make points to get the girl into the huddle."

After captain Farrar "Red" Vickory scored the team's third touchdown in week one, Wise came on to the field to attempt her first extra point. She wore a white helmet, white blouse, blue shorts, and wore number 0. Her first attempt was successful. She made two other attempts, but missed both, as Atmore beat Robertsdale by a score of 37–2. She became popular among fans, as an article in The Birmingham News said, "Instead of fans chanting. "We want a touchdown," the coach says they now chant, "We want Wise!" and when she goes in to convert the extra point, it causes more excitement than when Lincoln freed the slaves." Weighing 113 pounds, some newspapers wrote "...wrapped in a big blanket, she's practically invisible when she sits on the bench."

She returned to the team in 1940, and made each of her extra point attempts in the first week. In week two, Wise missed the first attempt before a bad snap led to her throwing a pass for the next point. Coach Andy Edington said, "The center threw the ball wild one day. She skipped back, picked up the ball and, as the entire opposing team enthusiastically raced through, she threw a beautiful long lateral to the captain. He made another pass to the end and we had another point." Afterwards Edington trained her in passing, and made her attempt passes on some extra points rather than kick. Her extra point attempts were widely covered in newspapers, as the Alabama Journal later wrote "by the time the 1939 and 1940 seasons were over Luverne Wise had been featured in virtually every newspaper in the country." When the season finished, Wise was named honorable mention all-state as a quarterback by high school coaches.

== Later life and death ==
After attending high school she became a golfer, but did not compete in much sports otherwise. She married Tony Albert in September 1946. She co-owned a sports store with him for 39 years, until her death in July 1982. She was inducted into the Atmore Area Hall of Fame in 2011.
