= Kanaranzi, Minnesota =

Kanaranzi
- Unincorporated community
- Location within Minnesota Location within the United States
- Coordinates: 43°34′33″N 96°05′40″W
- Country: United States
- State: Minnesota
- County: Rock
- Township: Kanaranzi
- Elevation: 1,506 ft (459 m)

Population (2011)
  - Total: 70
- Time zone: UTC-6 (Central (CST))
  - Summer (DST): UTC-5 (CDT)
- ZIP code: 56146
- Area code: 507
- GNIS feature ID: 646031

Kanaranzi (/ˌkænəˈrɒnzi/ KAN-ə-RON-zee) is an unincorporated community in Kanaranzi Township, Rock County, Minnesota, United States. Kanaranzi is 8 miles (13 km) southeast of Luverne. Kanaranzi had a post office, which opened on December 30, 1886, and closed on July 4, 1992. In 2011, the Minnesota Department of Transportation estimated its population to be 70. Kanaranzi was platted in 1885, and named after nearby Kanaranzi Creek.
