= Hardwick, Minnesota =

City in Minnesota, United States

Hardwick
- City
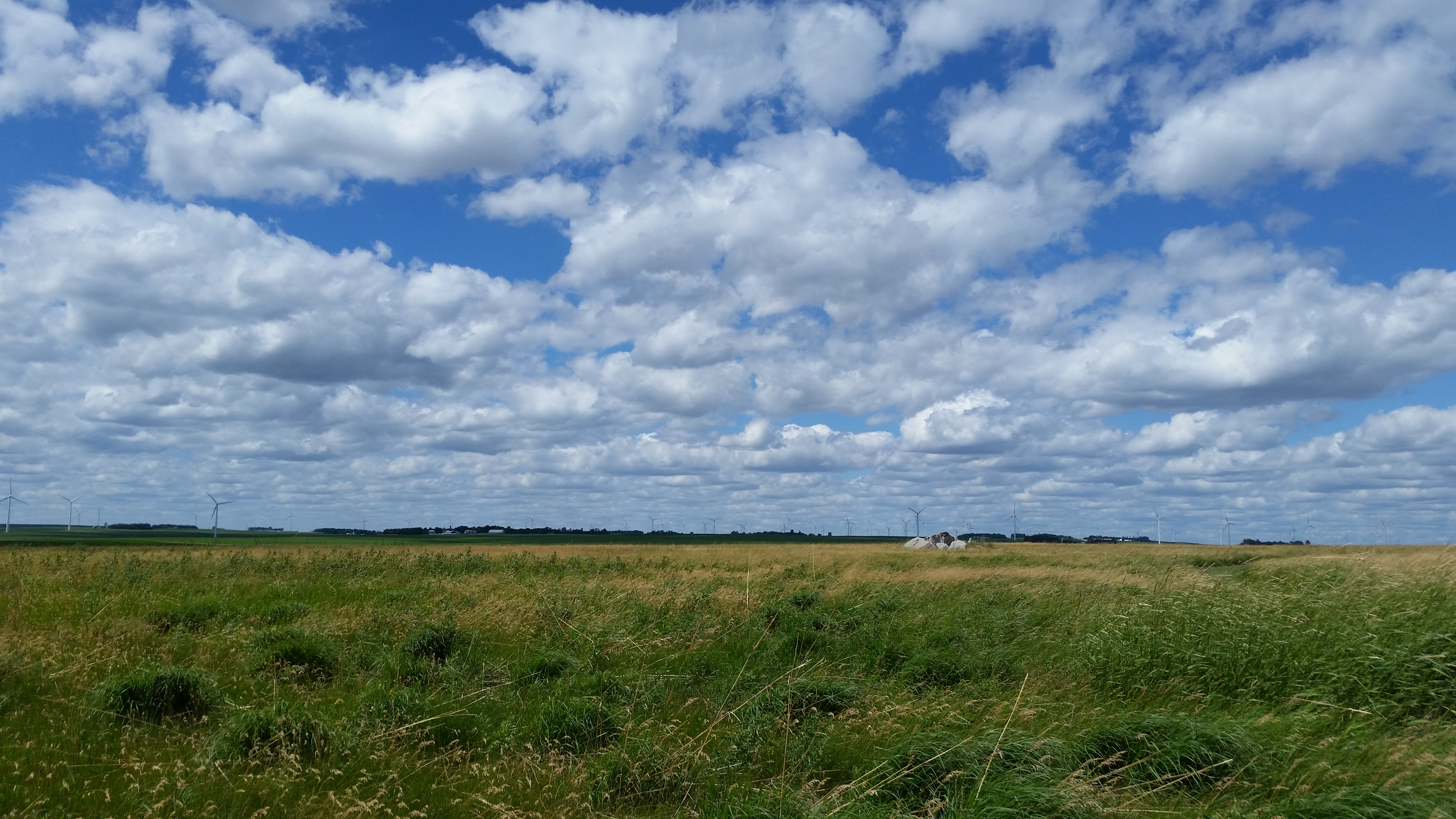
- Prairie and sky in Hardwick, Minnesota

- Location of Hardwick, Minnesota
- Coordinates: 43°46′27″N 96°11′51″W
- Country: United States
- State: Minnesota
- County: Rock

Government
  - Type: Mayor - Council
  - Mayor: Tom Haas

Area
  - Total: 1.76 sq mi (4.55 km^{2})
  - Land: 1.76 sq mi (4.55 km^{2})
  - Water: 0 sq mi (0.00 km^{2})
- Elevation: 1,588 ft (484 m)

Population (2020)
  - Total: 189
  - Estimate: 92 houses
  - Density: 108/sq mi (41.5/km^{2})
- Time zone: UTC-6 (Central (CST))
  - Summer (DST): UTC-5 (CDT)
- ZIP code: 56134
- Area code: 507
- FIPS code: 27-27116
- GNIS feature ID: 2394297
- Website: https://cityofhardwick.com/

Hardwick is a city in Rock County, Minnesota, United States. The population was 189 as of the 2020 census. Hardwick was platted in 1892, and named after J. L. Hardwick, a railroad official. A post office has been in operation at Hardwick since 1891. Hardwick was incorporated in 1898.

== Geography ==
According to the United States Census Bureau, the city has a total area of 1.74 square miles (4.51 km^{2}), all of it land.

== Demographics ==
Historical population
Census	Pop.	Note	%±
1900	259		—
1910	292		12.7%
1920	217		−25.7%
1930	247		13.8%
1940	273		10.5%
1950	297		8.8%
1960	328		10.4%
1970	274		−16.5%
1980	279		1.8%
1990	234		−16.1%
2000	222		−5.1%
2010	198		−10.8%
2020	189		−4.5%
U.S. Decennial Census

=== 2010 census ===
As of the census of 2010, there were 198 people, 87 households, and 52 families residing in the city. The population density was 113.8 inhabitants per square mile (43.9/km^{2}). There were 103 housing units at an average density of 59.2 per square mile (22.9/km^{2}). The racial makeup of the city was 98.0% White and 2.0% Native American. Hispanic or Latino of any race were 1.5% of the population.

There were 87 households, of which 24.1% had children under the age of 18 living with them, 43.7% were married couples living together, 11.5% had a female householder with no husband present, 4.6% had a male householder with no wife present, and 40.2% were non-families. 36.8% of all households were made up of individuals, and 19.5% had someone living alone who was 65 years of age or older. The average household size was 2.28 and the average family size was 2.92.

The median age in the city was 44 years. 23.7% of residents were under the age of 18; 10.7% were between the ages of 18 and 24; 18.1% were from 25 to 44; 27.3% were from 45 to 64; and 20.2% were 65 years of age or older. The gender makeup of the city was 44.4% male and 55.6% female.

=== 2000 census ===
As of the census of 2000, there were 222 people, 96 households, and 62 families residing in the city. The population density was 127.6 inhabitants per square mile (49.3/km^{2}). There were 104 housing units at an average density of 59.8 per square mile (23.1/km^{2}). The racial makeup of the city was 97.75% White and 2.25% Native American. Hispanic or Latino of any race were 0.90% of the population.

There were 96 households, out of which 29.2% had children under the age of 18 living with them, 49.0% were married couples living together, 10.4% had a female householder with no husband present, and 35.4% were non-families. 32.3% of all households were made up of individuals, and 19.8% had someone living alone who was 65 years of age or older. The average household size was 2.31 and the average family size was 2.92.

In the city, the population was spread out, with 27.5% under the age of 18, 4.5% from 18 to 24, 24.3% from 25 to 44, 23.4% from 45 to 64, and 20.3% who were 65 years of age or older. The median age was 40 years. For every 100 females, there were 89.7 males. For every 100 females age 18 and over, there were 91.7 males.

The median income for a household in the city was $29,583, and the median income for a family was $37,813. Males had a median income of $30,556 versus $23,750 for females. The per capita income for the city was $13,822. About 8.3% of families and 12.8% of the population were below the poverty line, including 24.3% of those under the age of eighteen and none of those 65 or over.

== Politics ==
Hardwick is located in Minnesota's 1st congressional district, represented by New Ulm farmer Brad Finstad, a Minnesota Republican. At the state level, Hardwick is located in Senate District 22, represented by Republican Rich Draheim, and in House District 22A, represented by Republican Joe Schomacker.

Hardwick's City Council consists of four elected members. Two seats are elected to two-year terms and the remaining two seats serve four-year terms. The mayor of Hardwick is elected to a two-year term.
