= Kanaranzi Township, Rock County, Minnesota =

Kanaranzi Township, Minnesota
- Township
- Location within the state of Minnesota Kanaranzi Township, Minnesota (the United States)
- Coordinates: 43°33′4″N 96°6′11″W
- Country: United States
- State: Minnesota
- County: Rock

Area
  - Total: 36.0 sq mi (93.3 km^{2})
  - Land: 36.0 sq mi (93.3 km^{2})
  - Water: 0 sq mi (0.0 km^{2})
- Elevation: 1,490 ft (454 m)

Population (2000)
  - Total: 286
  - Density: 8.0/sq mi (3.1/km^{2})
- Time zone: UTC-6 (Central (CST))
  - Summer (DST): UTC-5 (CDT)
- FIPS code: 27-32336
- GNIS feature ID: 0664595

Kanaranzi Township (/ˌkænəˈrɒnzi/ KAN-ə-RON-zee) is a township in Rock County, Minnesota, United States. The population was 286 at the 2000 census.

Kanaranzi Township was organized in 1873, and named after Kanaranzi Creek.

== Geography ==
According to the United States Census Bureau, the township has a total area of 36.0 square miles (93 km^{2}), all land.

== Demographics ==
As of the census of 2000, there were 286 people, 95 households, and 85 families residing in the township. The population density was 7.9 inhabitants per square mile (3.1/km^{2}). There were 105 housing units at an average density of 2.9 per square mile (1.1/km^{2}). The racial makeup of the township was 95.45% White, 0.70% African American, 3.15% Native American, 0.70% from other races. Hispanic or Latino of any race were 0.70% of the population.

There were 95 households, out of which 45.3% had children under the age of 18 living with them, 84.2% were married couples living together, and 9.5% were non-families. 8.4% of all households were made up of individuals, and 1.1% had someone living alone who was 65 years of age or older. The average household size was 3.01 and the average family size was 3.19.

In the township the population was spread out, with 31.5% under the age of 18, 8.4% from 18 to 24, 28.0% from 25 to 44, 23.4% from 45 to 64, and 8.7% who were 65 years of age or older. The median age was 33 years. For every 100 females, there were 116.7 males. For every 100 females age 18 and over, there were 110.8 males.

The median income for a household in the township was $42,500, and the median income for a family was $44,107. Males had a median income of $22,500 versus $19,750 for females. The per capita income for the township was $21,231. About 7.9% of families and 11.4% of the population were below the poverty line, including 12.7% of those under the age of eighteen and none of those 65 or over.

== Politics ==
Kanaranzi Township is located in Minnesota's 1st congressional district, represented by Jim Hagedorn, a Republican. At the state level, Kanaranzi Township is located in Senate District 22, represented by Republican Bill Weber, and in House District 22A, represented by Republican Joe Schomacker.
