= Luverne Township, Rock County, Minnesota =

Luverne Township, Minnesota
- Township
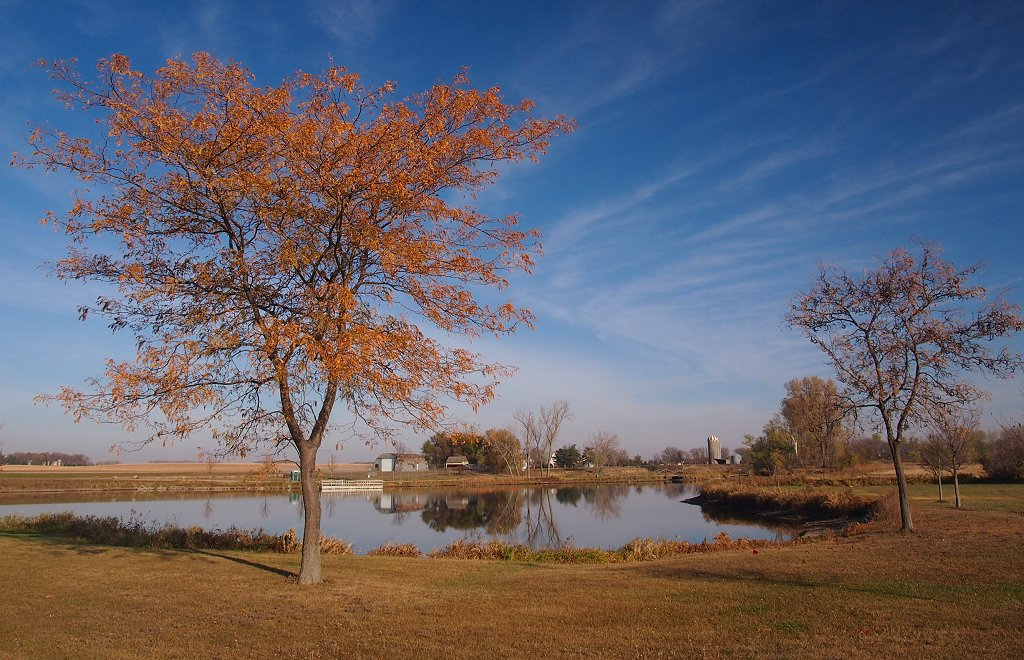
- Schoneman County Park in Luverne Township

- Location within the state of Minnesota Luverne Township, Minnesota (the United States)
- Coordinates: 43°38′18″N 96°13′28″W
- Country: United States
- State: Minnesota
- County: Rock

Area
  - Total: 32.7 sq mi (84.6 km^{2})
  - Land: 32.6 sq mi (84.5 km^{2})
  - Water: 0.039 sq mi (0.1 km^{2})
- Elevation: 1,473 ft (449 m)

Population (2000)
  - Total: 493
  - Density: 15/sq mi (5.8/km^{2})
- Time zone: UTC-6 (Central (CST))
  - Summer (DST): UTC-5 (CDT)
- ZIP code: 56156
- Area code: 507
- FIPS code: 27-38582
- GNIS feature ID: 0664841

Luverne Township is a township in Rock County, Minnesota, United States. The population was 493 at the 2000 census.

Luverne Township was organized in 1871.

== Geography ==
According to the United States Census Bureau, the township has a total area of 32.7 square miles (84.6 km^{2}), of which 32.6 square miles (84.5 km^{2}) is land and 0.1 square mile (0.1 km^{2}) (0.15%) is water.

== Demographics ==
As of the census of 2000, there were 493 people, 166 households, and 152 families residing in the township. The population density was 15.1 inhabitants per square mile (5.8/km^{2}). There were 169 housing units at an average density of 5.2 per square mile (2.0/km^{2}). The racial makeup of the township was 99.19% White, 0.41% African American, 0.20% Asian, and 0.20% from two or more races. Hispanic or Latino of any race were 0.41% of the population.

There were 166 households, out of which 41.6% had children under the age of 18 living with them, 86.7% were married couples living together, 3.0% had a female householder with no husband present, and 8.4% were non-families. 6.6% of all households were made up of individuals, and 4.2% had someone living alone who was 65 years of age or older. The average household size was 2.97 and the average family size was 3.11.

In the township the population was spread out, with 28.2% under the age of 18, 7.5% from 18 to 24, 28.4% from 25 to 44, 24.3% from 45 to 64, and 11.6% who were 65 years of age or older. The median age was 38 years. For every 100 females, there were 108.9 males. For every 100 females age 18 and over, there were 110.7 males.

The median income for a household in the township was $45,000, and the median income for a family was $44,167. Males had a median income of $29,688 versus $21,429 for females. The per capita income for the township was $16,270. About 5.1% of families and 6.3% of the population were below the poverty line, including 11.3% of those under age 18 and none of those age 65 or over.

== Politics ==
Luverne Township is located in Minnesota's 1st congressional district, represented by Mankato educator Tim Walz, a Democrat. At the state level, Luverne Township is located in Senate District 22, represented by Republican Doug Magnus, and in House District 22A, represented by Republican Joe Schomacker.
