= Rose Dell Township, Rock County, Minnesota =

Rose Dell Township, Minnesota
- Township
- Location within the state of Minnesota Rose Dell Township, Minnesota (the United States)
- Coordinates: 43°48′31″N 96°22′57″W
- Country: United States
- State: Minnesota
- County: Rock

Area
  - Total: 48.3 sq mi (125.0 km^{2})
  - Land: 48.3 sq mi (125.0 km^{2})
  - Water: 0 sq mi (0.0 km^{2})
- Elevation: 1,634 ft (498 m)

Population (2000)
  - Total: 214
  - Density: 4.4/sq mi (1.7/km^{2})
- Time zone: UTC-6 (Central (CST))
  - Summer (DST): UTC-5 (CDT)
- FIPS code: 27-55654
- GNIS feature ID: 0665463

Rose Dell Township is a township in Rock County, Minnesota, United States. The population was 214 at the 2000 census.

Rose Dell Township was organized in 1877, and named for the abundant wild roses in a dell.

== Geography ==
According to the United States Census Bureau, the township has a total area of 48.3 square miles (125.0 km^{2}), of which 48.2 square miles (125.0 km^{2}) is land and 0.04 square mile (0.1 km^{2}) (0.04%) is water.

== Demographics ==
As of the census of 2000, there were 214 people, 79 households, and 65 families residing in the township. The population density was 4.4 people per square mile (1.7/km^{2}). There were 87 housing units at an average density of 1.8/sq mi (0.7/km^{2}). The racial makeup of the township was 99.07% White, 0.47% Native American and 0.47% Asian.

There were 79 households, out of which 34.2% had children under the age of 18 living with them, 79.7% were married couples living together, and 17.7% were non-families. 16.5% of all households were made up of individuals, and 10.1% had someone living alone who was 65 years of age or older. The average household size was 2.71 and the average family size was 3.06.

In the township the population was spread out, with 28.5% under the age of 18, 7.9% from 18 to 24, 22.4% from 25 to 44, 22.4% from 45 to 64, and 18.7% who were 65 years of age or older. The median age was 39 years. For every 100 females, there were 118.4 males. For every 100 females age 18 and over, there were 109.6 males.

The median income for a household in the township was $37,250, and the median income for a family was $38,750. Males had a median income of $30,833 versus $22,031 for females. The per capita income for the township was $16,567. About 6.3% of families and 6.3% of the population were below the poverty line, including 8.3% of those under the age of eighteen and 7.5% of those 65 or over.

== Politics ==
Rose Dell Township is located in Minnesota's 1st congressional district, represented by Mankato politician Tim Walz, a Democrat. At the state level, Rose Dell Township is located in Senate District 22, represented by Republican farmer Doug Magnus, and in House District 22A, represented by Republican businessman-educatorJoe Schomacker.

== Notable person ==
- Clarence H. Nelson, physician to F. Scott Fitzgerald
