= Ash Creek (Arizona) =

Coordinates: 32°48′21″N 109°51′46″W

Location
- Country: United States
- State: Arizona

Physical characteristics
- Source
  - elevation: 4,200–9,440 ft (1,280–2,880 m)

Ash Creek is located in southeastern Arizona in the Pinaleño Mountain Range, part of Coronado National Forest. The closest city is Safford, about 7 miles (11 km) away.

== Fish species ==
- Apache trout
