= Rock County, Minnesota =

County in Minnesota, United States

- County
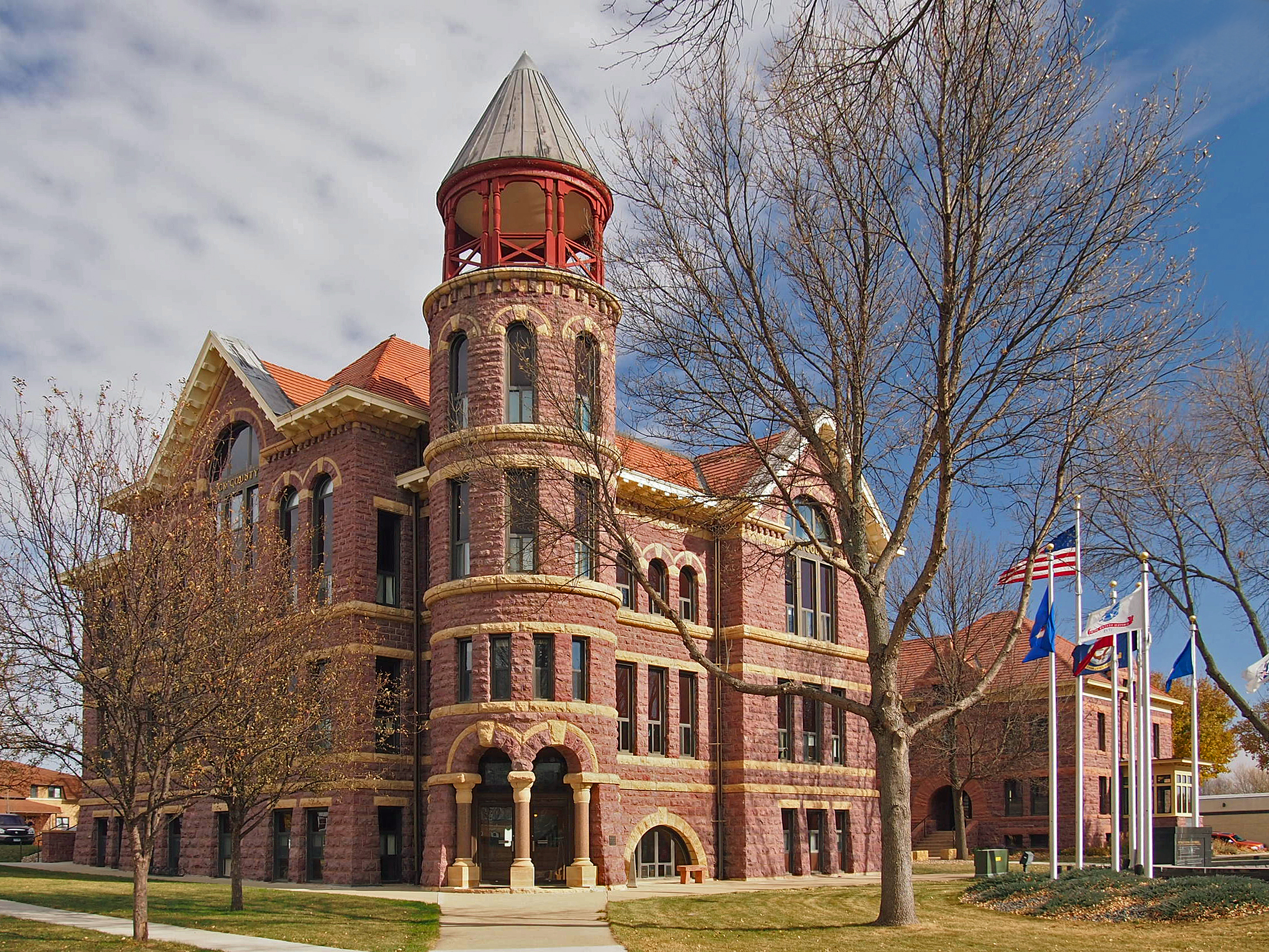
- Rock County Courthouse

- Location within the U.S. state of Minnesota
- Coordinates: 43°40′N 96°15′W
- Country: United States
- State: Minnesota
- Founded: May 23, 1857 (created); March 5, 1870 (organized)
- Named for: Rock outcrop on Rock River
- Seat: Luverne
- Largest city: Luverne

Area
  - Total: 483 sq mi (1,250 km^{2})
  - Land: 482 sq mi (1,250 km^{2})
  - Water: 0.3 sq mi (0.78 km^{2}) 0.06%

Population (2020)
  - Total: 9,704
  - Estimate (2025): 9,524 ▼
  - Density: 20.1/sq mi (7.8/km^{2})
- Time zone: UTC−6 (Central)
  - Summer (DST): UTC−5 (CDT)
- Congressional district: 1st
- Website: www.co.rock.mn.us

Rock County is a county located in the southwestern corner of the U.S. state of Minnesota. According to the 2020 census, its population was 9,704. The county seat is Luverne. It is located within the Sioux Falls MSA.

== History ==
The county was established on May 23, 1857, by an act of the territorial legislature, although it was not organized at that time. Originally, the area was designated as Pipestone County, and the name Rock County was given to what is now Pipestone County. However, in 1862, the Minnesota state legislature changed the designations, assigning the present names to the respective counties. On March 5, 1870, the state legislature passed an act that finalized the organization of Rock County and designated Luverne as its county seat. The county derived its name from the Rock River, which was named after a prominent rocky outcrop referred to as "The Rock" on an 1843 map of the area. This outcrop is composed of reddish-gray quartzite and is located approximately 3 miles (4.8 km) north of Luverne. The mound stands out dramatically amidst the surrounding low prairie. Another source suggests that the county's name is attributed to its rocky soil.

== Geography ==
Rock County is located at the southwestern corner of Minnesota. Its western border shares a boundary with the eastern border of South Dakota, while its southern border is adjacent to the northern border of Iowa. The county is characterized by the flow of the Rock River, which runs southward through its east central part, and Beaver Creek, which flows southward through its west central region. The landscape primarily consists of low rolling hills with various drainages. The county's predominant land use is agriculture. The terrain gradually slopes southward, with the highest point situated near the midpoint of the county's northern boundary, reaching an elevation of 1,759 ft (536 m) above sea level. Rock County spans an area of 483 square miles (1,250 km^{2}), of which 482 square miles (1,250 km^{2}) is land and 0.3 square miles (0.78 km^{2}) (0.06%) is water. The entire county falls within the hot summer humid continental climate zone (Dfa).

Soils of Rock County

=== Lakes ===
One of Minnesota's nicknames is "Land of 10,000 Lakes", and it is speckled with bodies of water large and small. But four of the state's counties do not contain a natural lake; Rock County is one of them. Rock County did host a manmade lake from 1938 until 2014: a WPA work project constructed a small dam (the "Lower Dam") on Blue Mounds Creek in 1938, creating a small lake in Blue Mounds State Park. This continued until June 2014, when the dam was damaged by rain and floodwaters, allowing the pond to drain. In June 2016 the Minnesota Department of Natural Resources announced its decision not to rebuild the dam.

=== Major highways ===
- Interstate 90
- U.S. Highway 75
- Minnesota State Highway 23
- Minnesota State Highway 269
- Minnesota State Highway 270

=== Adjacent counties ===
- Pipestone County – north
- Murray County – northeast
- Nobles County – east
- Lyon County, Iowa – south
- Minnehaha County, South Dakota – west
- Moody County, South Dakota – northwest

=== Protected areas ===
- Blue Mounds State Park
- Northern Tallgrass Prairie National Wildlife Refuge (part)

== Demographics ==
Historical population
Census	Pop.	Note	%±
1860	23		—
1870	138		500.0%
1880	3,669		2,558.7%
1890	6,817		85.8%
1900	9,668		41.8%
1910	10,222		5.7%
1920	10,965		7.3%
1930	10,962		0.0%
1940	10,933		−0.3%
1950	11,278		3.2%
1960	11,864		5.2%
1970	11,346		−4.4%
1980	10,703		−5.7%
1990	9,806		−8.4%
2000	9,721		−0.9%
2010	9,687		−0.3%
2020	9,704		0.2%
2025 (est.)	9,524	▼	−1.9%
U.S. Decennial Census; 1790-1960 1900-1990; 1990-2000 2010-2020

=== Racial and ethnic composition ===
Rock County, Minnesota – Racial and ethnic composition Note: the US Census treats Hispanic/Latino as an ethnic category. This table excludes Latinos from the racial categories and assigns them to a separate category. Hispanics/Latinos may be of any race.
Race / Ethnicity (NH = Non-Hispanic)	Pop 1980	Pop 1990	Pop 2000	Pop 2010	Pop 2020	% 1980	% 1990	% 2000	% 2010	% 2020
White alone (NH)	10,636	9,713	9,396	9,239	8,886	99.37%	99.05%	96.66%	95.38%	91.57%
Black or African American alone (NH)	6	12	52	58	50	0.06%	0.12%	0.53%	0.60%	0.52%
Native American or Alaska Native alone (NH)	13	33	41	31	48	0.12%	0.34%	0.42%	0.32%	0.49%
Asian alone (NH)	25	19	58	53	62	0.23%	0.19%	0.60%	0.55%	0.64%
Native Hawaiian or Pacific Islander alone (NH)	x	x	1	1	10	x	x	0.01%	0.01%	0.10%
Other race alone (NH)	3	0	2	4	0	0.03%	0.00%	0.02%	0.04%	0.00%
Mixed race or Multiracial (NH)	x	x	47	104	284	x	x	0.48%	1.07%	2.93%
Hispanic or Latino (any race)	20	29	124	197	364	0.19%	0.30%	1.28%	2.03%	3.75%
Total	10,703	9,806	9,721	9,687	9,704	100.00%	100.00%	100.00%	100.00%	100.00%

=== 2020 census ===
As of the 2020 census, the county had a population of 9,704. The median age was 41.5 years. 25.2% of residents were under the age of 18 and 21.8% of residents were 65 years of age or older. For every 100 females there were 98.2 males, and for every 100 females age 18 and over there were 96.3 males age 18 and over.

The racial makeup of the county was 92.7% White, 0.5% Black or African American, 0.6% American Indian and Alaska Native, 0.7% Asian, 0.1% Native Hawaiian and Pacific Islander, 1.1% from some other race, and 4.3% from two or more races. Hispanic or Latino residents of any race comprised 3.8% of the population.

49.5% of residents lived in urban areas, while 50.5% lived in rural areas.

There were 3,892 households in the county, of which 29.7% had children under the age of 18 living in them. Of all households, 54.9% were married-couple households, 17.4% were households with a male householder and no spouse or partner present, and 22.9% were households with a female householder and no spouse or partner present. About 30.0% of all households were made up of individuals and 15.5% had someone living alone who was 65 years of age or older.

There were 4,222 housing units, of which 7.8% were vacant. Among occupied housing units, 75.4% were owner-occupied and 24.6% were renter-occupied. The homeowner vacancy rate was 1.7% and the rental vacancy rate was 7.8%.

=== 2000 census ===
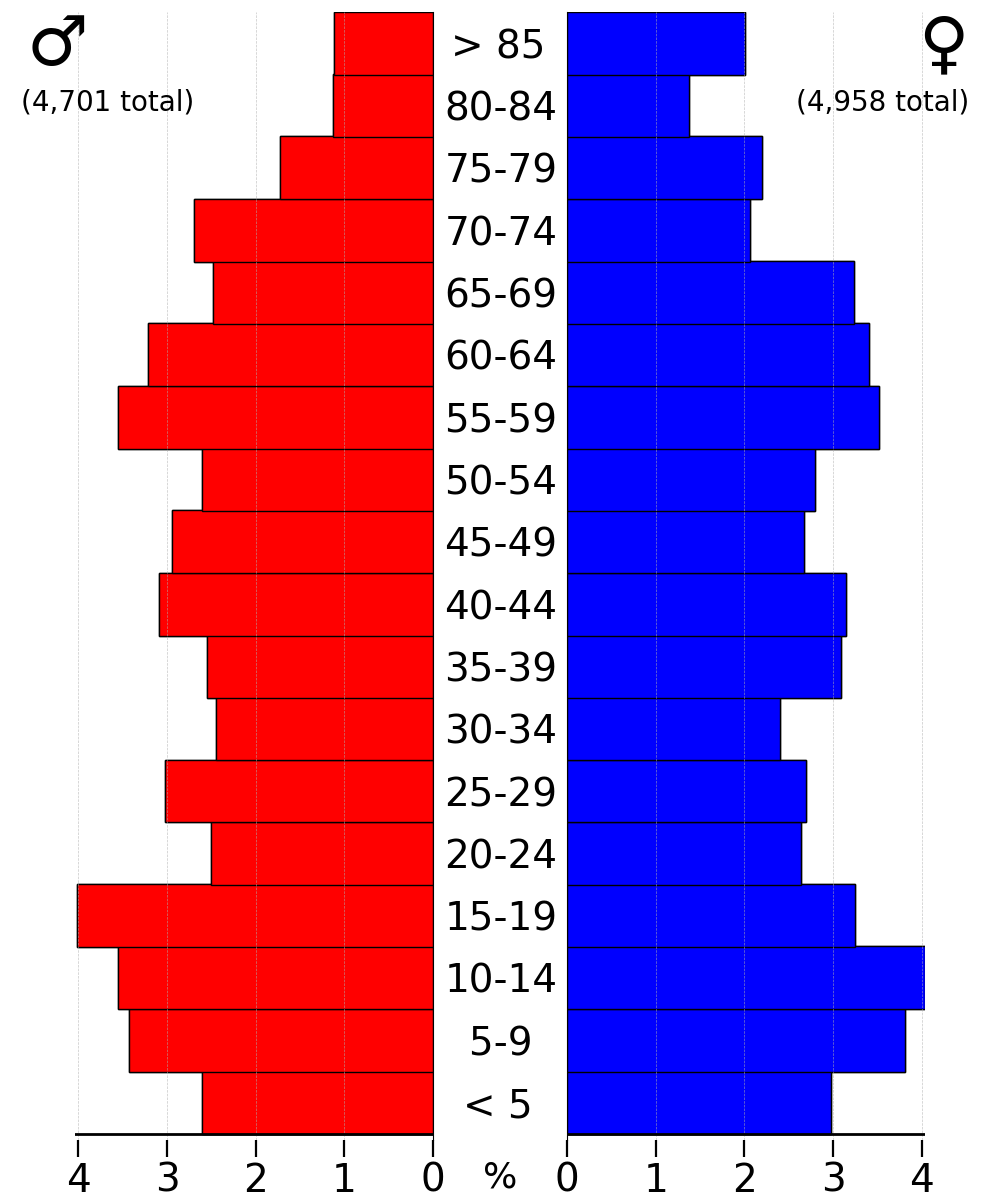
2022 US Census population pyramid for Rock County, from ACS 5-year estimates

As of the census of 2000, there were 9,721 people, 3,843 households, and 2,705 families in the county. The population density was 20.2 per square mile (7.8/km^{2}). There were 4,137 housing units at an average density of 8.58 per square mile (3.31/km^{2}). The racial makeup of the county was 97.27% White, 0.53% Black or African American, 0.43% Native American, 0.62% Asian, 0.02% Pacific Islander, 0.53% from other races, and 0.59% from two or more races. 1.28% of the population were Hispanic or Latino of any race. 41.4% were of German, 23.8% Dutch and 16.5% Norwegian ancestry.

There were 3,843 households, out of which 31.30% had children under the age of 18 living with them, 62.10% were married couples living together, 5.50% had a female householder with no husband present, and 29.60% were non-families. 27.00% of all households were made up of individuals, and 15.70% had someone living alone who was 65 years of age or older. The average household size was 2.47 and the average family size was 3.01.

The county population contained 26.30% under the age of 18, 7.20% from 18 to 24, 24.10% from 25 to 44, 22.00% from 45 to 64, and 20.40% who were 65 years of age or older. The median age was 40 years. For every 100 females there were 97.60 males. For every 100 females age 18 and over, there were 93.00 males.

The median income for a household in the county was $38,102, and the median income for a family was $44,296. Males had a median income of $28,776 versus $22,166 for females. The per capita income for the county was $17,411. About 5.50% of families and 8.00% of the population were below the poverty line, including 8.10% of those under age 18 and 8.90% of those age 65 or over.

== Communities ==
Rock County Administrative map (Minnesota)

=== Cities ===
- Beaver Creek
- Hardwick
- Hills
- Jasper (part)
- Kenneth
- Luverne (county seat)
- Magnolia
- Steen

=== Unincorporated communities ===
- Ash Creek
- Kanaranzi
- Manley

=== Ghost towns ===
- Bruce
- Carnegie

=== Townships ===
- Battle Plain Township
- Beaver Creek Township
- Clinton Township
- Denver Township
- Kanaranzi Township
- Luverne Township
- Magnolia Township
- Martin Township
- Mound Township
- Rose Dell Township
- Springwater Township
- Vienna Township

== In popular culture ==
Much of the second season of Fargo is set in Luverne and Rock County.

== Government and politics ==
County Board of Commissioners
Position	Name	District
Commissioner	Gary Overgaard	District 1
Commissioner	Stan Williamson	District 2
Commissioner	Greg Burger	District 3
Commissioner	Sherri Thompson	District 4
Commissioner	Jody Reisch	District 5

State Legislature (2025-2027)
Position	Name	Affiliation	District
Senate	Bill Weber	Republican	21
House of Representatives	Joe Schomacker	Republican	21A

U.S Congress (2025-2027)
Position	Name	Affiliation	District
House of Representatives	Brad Finstad	Republican	1st
Senate	Amy Klobuchar	Democrat	N/A
Senate	Tina Smith	Democrat	N/A

=== National politics ===
Rock County traditionally votes Republican. In no presidential election since 1964 has it selected the Democratic candidate. Along with its northern neighbor Pipestone County, it was one of only two Minnesota counties Amy Klobuchar did not win in her 2012 Senate race.

United States presidential election results for Rock County, Minnesota
Year	Republican		Democratic		Third party(ies)	
Year	No.	%	No.	%	No.	%
1892	940	59.64%	383	24.30%	253	16.05%
1896	1,209	59.85%	765	37.87%	46	2.28%
1900	1,234	65.19%	573	30.27%	86	4.54%
1904	1,243	79.12%	241	15.34%	87	5.54%
1908	1,234	67.21%	525	28.59%	77	4.19%
1912	463	25.58%	466	25.75%	881	48.67%
1916	1,196	59.68%	705	35.18%	103	5.14%
1920	3,121	84.53%	442	11.97%	129	3.49%
1924	2,065	51.98%	261	6.57%	1,647	41.45%
1928	2,433	60.03%	1,607	39.65%	13	0.32%
1932	1,452	34.56%	2,695	64.15%	54	1.29%
1936	1,752	36.21%	2,910	60.15%	176	3.64%
1940	2,944	59.46%	1,983	40.05%	24	0.48%
1944	2,584	60.66%	1,649	38.71%	27	0.63%
1948	2,035	48.06%	2,134	50.40%	65	1.54%
1952	3,774	74.48%	1,286	25.38%	7	0.14%
1956	3,267	67.19%	1,591	32.72%	4	0.08%
1960	3,469	65.49%	1,823	34.42%	5	0.09%
1964	2,389	45.19%	2,896	54.78%	2	0.04%
1968	3,056	56.87%	2,084	38.78%	234	4.35%
1972	3,470	61.83%	2,089	37.22%	53	0.94%
1976	2,892	50.39%	2,769	48.25%	78	1.36%
1980	3,164	55.38%	2,089	36.57%	460	8.05%
1984	2,971	57.18%	2,188	42.11%	37	0.71%
1988	2,737	52.48%	2,435	46.69%	43	0.82%
1992	2,065	38.68%	2,006	37.58%	1,267	23.74%
1996	2,169	44.23%	2,142	43.68%	593	12.09%
2000	2,772	55.33%	2,081	41.54%	157	3.13%
2004	3,111	59.93%	2,000	38.53%	80	1.54%
2008	2,775	55.78%	2,079	41.79%	121	2.43%
2012	2,810	57.99%	1,946	40.16%	90	1.86%
2016	3,091	63.88%	1,373	28.37%	375	7.75%
2020	3,583	68.38%	1,556	29.69%	101	1.93%
2024	3,690	68.68%	1,585	29.50%	98	1.82%

== See also ==
- National Register of Historic Places listings in Rock County, Minnesota
