= Kenneth, Minnesota =

City in Minnesota, United States

Kenneth
- City
- Location of Kenneth, Minnesota
- Coordinates: 43°45′15″N 96°4′21″W
- Country: United States
- State: Minnesota
- County: Rock

Government
  - Type: Mayor - Council
  - Mayor: Delbert Gangestad

Area
  - Total: 1.06 sq mi (2.75 km^{2})
  - Land: 1.06 sq mi (2.75 km^{2})
  - Water: 0 sq mi (0.00 km^{2})
- Elevation: 1,575 ft (480 m)

Population (2020)
  - Total: 60
  - Density: 56.5/sq mi (21.81/km^{2})
- Time zone: UTC-6 (Central (CST))
  - Summer (DST): UTC-5 (CDT)
- ZIP code: 56147
- Area code: 507
- FIPS code: 27-32750
- GNIS feature ID: 2395507

Kenneth is a city in Rock County, Minnesota, United States. As of the 2020 census, Kenneth had a population of 60.

== History ==
Kenneth was platted in 1900, and named for Kenneth Kennicott, the son of an early settler. A post office was in operation at Kenneth from 1900 until it closed in 2011.

== Geography ==
According to the United States Census Bureau, the city has a total area of 1.05 square miles (2.72 km^{2}), all land.

Kenneth is located at 43.75327° N, 96.07182° W, and its Zip code is 56147.

== Demographics ==
Historical population
Census	Pop.	Note	%±
1930	118		—
1940	148		25.4%
1950	119		−19.6%
1960	111		−6.7%
1970	89		−19.8%
1980	95		6.7%
1990	81		−14.7%
2000	61		−24.7%
2010	68		11.5%
2020	60		−11.8%
U.S. Decennial Census

=== 2010 census ===
As of the census of 2010, there were 68 people, 29 households, and 18 families residing in the city. The population density was 64.8 inhabitants per square mile (25.0/km^{2}). There were 31 housing units at an average density of 29.5 per square mile (11.4/km^{2}). The racial makeup of the city was 100.0% White.

There were 29 households, of which 24.1% had children under the age of 18 living with them, 51.7% were married couples living together, 3.4% had a female householder with no husband present, 6.9% had a male householder with no wife present, and 37.9% were non-families. 31.0% of all households were made up of individuals, and 10.3% had someone living alone who was 65 years of age or older. The average household size was 2.34 and the average family size was 2.94.

The median age in the city was 44 years. 22.1% of residents were under the age of 18; 7.4% were between the ages of 18 and 24; 20.6% were from 25 to 44; 32.4% were from 45 to 64; and 17.6% were 65 years of age or older. The gender makeup of the city was 58.8% male and 41.2% female.

=== 2000 census ===
As of the census of 2000, there were 61 people, 27 households, and 16 families residing in Kenneth. The population density was 57.8 inhabitants per square mile (22.3/km^{2}). There were 29 housing units at an average density of 27.5 per square mile (10.6/km^{2}). The racial makeup of the city was 90.16% White, 8.20% Native American, and 1.64% from two or more races.

There were 27 households, out of which 14.8% had children under the age of 18 living with them, 55.6% were married couples living together, 3.7% had a female householder with no husband present, and 40.7% were non-families. 22.2% of all households were made up of individuals, and 11.1% had someone living alone who was 65 years of age or older. The average household size was 2.26 and the average family size was 2.69.

In the city, the population was spread out, with 18.0% under the age of 18, 19.7% from 18 to 24, 13.1% from 25 to 44, 27.9% from 45 to 64, and 21.3% who were 65 years of age or older. The median age was 44 years. For every 100 females, there were 90.6 males. For every 100 females age 18 and over, there were 100.0 males.

The median income for a household in the city was $38,125, and the median income for a family was $48,750. Males had a median income of $13,125 versus $23,750 for females. The per capita income for the city was $19,078. None of the families and 6.9% of the population were below the poverty line, including none of those under the age of 18 or 65 and older.

== Politics ==
Kenneth is located in Minnesota's 1st congressional district, represented by Brad Finstad, a Republican. At the state level, Kenneth is located in Senate District 21, Bill Weber, a Republican, and in House District 21A, represented by Joe Schomacker, a Republican.
