= Monroe, South Dakota =

- Town
- Location in Turner County and the state of South Dakota
- Coordinates: 43°29′12″N 97°13′00″W
- Country: United States
- State: South Dakota
- County: Turner
- Incorporated: 1901

Area
  - Total: 0.38 sq mi (0.98 km^{2})
  - Land: 0.38 sq mi (0.98 km^{2})
  - Water: 0 sq mi (0.00 km^{2})
- Elevation: 1,499 ft (457 m)

Population (2020)
  - Total: 159
  - Density: 419.8/sq mi (162.07/km^{2})
- Time zone: UTC-6 (Central (CST))
  - Summer (DST): UTC-5 (CDT)
- ZIP code: 57047
- Area code: 605
- FIPS code: 46-43380
- GNIS feature ID: 1267482

Monroe is a town in Turner County, South Dakota, United States. The population was 159 at the 2020 census.

== History ==
Monroe was originally called Warrington, and under the latter name was platted in 1887. Some say the present name is for James Monroe, fifth President of the United States, while others believe the name is a transfer from Monroe, Wisconsin, the native home of an early settler. A post office called Monroe was established in 1890, and remained in operation until it was discontinued in 1965.

== Geography ==
According to the United States Census Bureau, the town has a total area of 0.38 square miles (0.98 km^{2}), all land.

== Demographics ==
Historical population
Census	Pop.	Note	%±
1910	169		—
1920	217		28.4%
1930	221		1.8%
1940	219		−0.9%
1950	160		−26.9%
1960	156		−2.5%
1970	134		−14.1%
1980	170		26.9%
1990	151		−11.2%
2000	163		7.9%
2010	160		−1.8%
2020	159		−0.6%
U.S. Decennial Census

=== 2010 census ===
As of the census of 2010, there were 160 people, 68 households, and 43 families residing in the town. The population density was 421.1 inhabitants per square mile (162.6/km^{2}). There were 75 housing units at an average density of 197.4 per square mile (76.2/km^{2}). The racial makeup of the town was 98.1% White, 0.6% Asian, and 1.3% from two or more races. Hispanic or Latino of any race were 0.6% of the population.

There were 68 households, of which 23.5% had children under the age of 18 living with them, 47.1% were married couples living together, 8.8% had a female householder with no husband present, 7.4% had a male householder with no wife present, and 36.8% were non-families. 22.1% of all households were made up of individuals, and 8.9% had someone living alone who was 65 years of age or older. The average household size was 2.35 and the average family size was 2.74.

The median age in the town was 45.5 years. 18.7% of residents were under the age of 18; 7.5% were between the ages of 18 and 24; 23.2% were from 25 to 44; 32.6% were from 45 to 64; and 18.1% were 65 years of age or older. The gender makeup of the town was 47.5% male and 52.5% female.

=== 2000 census ===
As of the census of 2000, there were 163 people, 70 households, and 48 families residing in the town. The population density was 432.8 inhabitants per square mile (167.1/km^{2}). There were 75 housing units at an average density of 199.1 per square mile (76.9/km^{2}). The racial makeup of the town was 96.32% White, 2.45% African American, 0.61% Native American and 0.61% Asian.

There were 70 households, out of which 28.6% had children under the age of 18 living with them, 52.9% were married couples living together, 11.4% had a female householder with no husband present, and 31.4% were non-families. 27.1% of all households were made up of individuals, and 14.3% had someone living alone who was 65 years of age or older. The average household size was 2.33 and the average family size was 2.77.

In the town, the population was spread out, with 23.9% under the age of 18, 8.0% from 18 to 24, 24.5% from 25 to 44, 21.5% from 45 to 64, and 22.1% who were 65 years of age or older. The median age was 39 years. For every 100 females, there were 91.8 males. For every 100 females age 18 and over, there were 87.9 males.

The median income for a household in the town was $34,375, and the median income for a family was $42,143. Males had a median income of $26,875 versus $26,875 for females. The per capita income for the town was $17,512. About 1.9% of families and 10.4% of the population were below the poverty line, including 9.8% of those under the age of eighteen and 24.2% of those 65 or over.
