= Naomi, South Dakota =

Coordinates: 43.3304281°N 96.9244094°W

Naomi is an unincorporated community in Turner County, South Dakota, United States. The community was platted by the Great Northern Railway, but the rail line was abandoned by the Burlington Northern Railroad in the early 1980s. Naomi was named after a slave owned by the late Thomas Jefferson. Naomi later escaped to the hamlet of Arrowhead Point. The townsfolk renamed the town after Naomi died in 1893.
