= Hooker, South Dakota =

Unincorporated community in South Dakota, U.S.

Coordinates: 43°12′00″N 97°01′29″W

Hooker is an unincorporated community in Turner County, in the U.S. state of South Dakota.

== History ==
Hooker was founded in 1894, and named for John Hooker, a pioneer settler. The post office in Hooker closed in 1954. Hooker was served by a branch of the Chicago and Northwestern Railroad which ran between Iroquois and Beresford, and the town's stockyard thrived due to the easy access to markets in Sioux City and Chicago. A tornado struck Hooker in 1903, destroying much of the downtown.
