= Clinton Township, Rock County, Minnesota =

Clinton Township, Minnesota
- Township
- Location within the state of Minnesota Clinton Township, Minnesota (the United States)
- Coordinates: 43°32′5″N 96°14′32″W
- Country: United States
- State: Minnesota
- County: Rock

Area
  - Total: 35.6 sq mi (92.2 km^{2})
  - Land: 35.6 sq mi (92.2 km^{2})
  - Water: 0 sq mi (0.0 km^{2})
- Elevation: 1,424 ft (434 m)

Population (2000)
  - Total: 292
  - Density: 8.3/sq mi (3.2/km^{2})
- Time zone: UTC-6 (Central (CST))
  - Summer (DST): UTC-5 (CDT)
- FIPS code: 27-11998
- GNIS feature ID: 0663826

Clinton Township is a township in Rock County, Minnesota, United States. The population was 292 at the 2000 census.

Clinton Township was organized in 1871, and named after Clinton, New York.

== Geography ==
According to the United States Census Bureau, the township has a total area of 35.6 square miles (92 km^{2}), all land.

== Demographics ==
As of the census of 2000, there were 292 people, 103 households, and 80 families residing in the township. The population density was 8.2 inhabitants per square mile (3.2/km^{2}). There were 110 housing units at an average density of 3.1 per square mile (1.2/km^{2}). The racial makeup of the township was 99.66% White, and 0.34% from two or more races. Hispanic or Latino of any race were 0.34% of the population.

There were 103 households, out of which 40.8% had children under the age of 18 living with them, 73.8% were married couples living together, 1.0% had a female householder with no husband present, and 22.3% were non-families. 19.4% of all households were made up of individuals, and 7.8% had someone living alone who was 65 years of age or older. The average household size was 2.83 and the average family size was 3.31.

In the township the population was spread out, with 31.8% under the age of 18, 6.5% from 18 to 24, 23.6% from 25 to 44, 25.3% from 45 to 64, and 12.7% who were 65 years of age or older. The median age was 37 years. For every 100 females, there were 107.1 males. For every 100 females age 18 and over, there were 116.3 males.

The median income for a household in the township was $42,500, and the median income for a family was $44,643. Males had a median income of $36,250 versus $20,000 for females. The per capita income for the township was $16,251. About 2.6% of families and 4.2% of the population were below the poverty line, including 4.8% of those under the age of eighteen and none of those 65 or over.

== Politics ==
Clinton Township is located in Minnesota's 1st congressional district, represented by Jim Hagedorn, a Republican. At the state level, Clinton Township is located in Senate District 22, represented by Republican Bill Weber, and in House District 22A, represented by Republican Joe Schomacker.
