= Steen, Minnesota =

City in Minnesota, United States

Steen
- City
- Location of Steen, Minnesota
- Coordinates: 43°30′48″N 96°15′50″W
- Country: United States
- State: Minnesota
- County: Rock

Government
  - Type: Mayor - Council
  - Mayor: Melvin Van Batavia

Area
  - Total: 0.44 sq mi (1.13 km^{2})
  - Land: 0.44 sq mi (1.13 km^{2})
  - Water: 0 sq mi (0.00 km^{2})
- Elevation: 1,493 ft (455 m)

Population (2020)
  - Total: 171
  - Density: 391.0/sq mi (150.95/km^{2})
- Time zone: UTC-6 (Central (CST))
  - Summer (DST): UTC-5 (CDT)
- ZIP code: 56173
- Area code: 507
- FIPS code: 27-62662
- GNIS feature ID: 0652602
- Website: https://www.steenmn.com/

Steen is a city in Rock County, Minnesota, United States. As of the 2020 census, Steen had a population of 171.

== History ==
Steen was platted in 1888, and named for brothers John P. Steen and Ole P. Steen, Norwegian settlers. A post office was in operation at Steen from 1888 until closing in 2011.

== Geography ==
According to the United States Census Bureau, the city has a total area of 0.42 square miles (1.09 km^{2}), all land.

== Demographics ==
Historical population
Census	Pop.	Note	%±
1950	228		—
1960	198		−13.2%
1970	191		−3.5%
1980	153		−19.9%
1990	176		15.0%
2000	182		3.4%
2010	180		−1.1%
2020	171		−5.0%
U.S. Decennial Census

=== 2010 census ===
As of the census of 2010, there were 180 people, 67 households, and 49 families living in the city. The population density was 428.6 inhabitants per square mile (165.5/km^{2}). There were 76 housing units at an average density of 181.0 per square mile (69.9/km^{2}). The racial makeup of the city was 90.0% White, 2.8% Native American, 1.1% Asian, and 6.1% from two or more races. Hispanic or Latino of any race were 0.6% of the population.

There were 67 households, of which 43.3% had children under the age of 18 living with them, 55.2% were married couples living together, 11.9% had a female householder with no husband present, 6.0% had a male householder with no wife present, and 26.9% were non-families. 26.9% of all households were made up of individuals, and 9% had someone living alone who was 65 years of age or older. The average household size was 2.69 and the average family size was 3.24.

The median age in the city was 33 years. 35.6% of residents were under the age of 18; 5% were between the ages of 18 and 24; 25.6% were from 25 to 44; 23.9% were from 45 to 64; and 10% were 65 years of age or older. The gender makeup of the city was 50.0% male and 50.0% female.

=== 2000 census ===
As of the census of 2000, there were 182 people, 69 households, and 46 families living in the city. The population density was 429.5 inhabitants per square mile (165.8/km^{2}). There were 72 housing units at an average density of 169.9 per square mile (65.6/km^{2}). The racial makeup of the city was 96.70% White, 0.55% African American, 0.55% Native American, 0.55% Asian, 1.65% from other races. Hispanic or Latino of any race were 1.65% of the population.

There were 69 households, out of which 39.1% had children under the age of 18 living with them, 58.0% were married couples living together, 5.8% had a female householder with no husband present, and 31.9% were non-families. 27.5% of all households were made up of individuals, and 18.8% had someone living alone who was 65 years of age or older. The average household size was 2.64 and the average family size was 3.32.

In the city, the population was spread out, with 32.4% under the age of 18, 8.8% from 18 to 24, 26.4% from 25 to 44, 14.8% from 45 to 64, and 17.6% who were 65 years of age or older. The median age was 30 years. For every 100 females, there were 89.6 males. For every 100 females age 18 and over, there were 95.2 males.

The median income for a household in the city was $36,875, and the median income for a family was $43,125. Males had a median income of $31,750 versus $21,250 for females. The per capita income for the city was $15,531. None of the families and 2.4% of the population were living below the poverty line.

== Politics ==
Steen is located in Minnesota's 1st congressional district, represented by Republican Jim Hagedorn. At the state level, Steen is located in Senate District 22, represented by Republican Doug Magnus, and in House District 22A, represented by Republican Joe Schomacker.
