= Kanaranzi Creek =

Stream in Iowa and Minnesota, U.S.

Coordinates: 43°26′53″N 96°10′05″W

Kanaranzi Creek is a stream in the U.S. states of Iowa and Minnesota.

The name Kanaranzi comes from the Dakota word for "where the Kansas were killed".

== See also ==
- List of rivers of Iowa
- List of rivers of Minnesota
