= Hills, Minnesota =

City in Minnesota, United States

Hills
- City
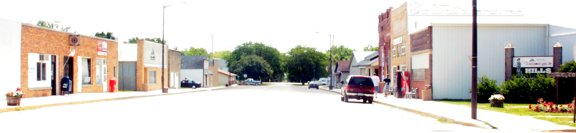
- Motto: Tree City USA
- Location of Hills, Minnesota
- Coordinates: 43°31′39″N 96°21′33″W
- Country: United States
- State: Minnesota
- County: Rock

Government
  - Type: Mayor - Council
  - Mayor: Keith Elbers

Area
  - Total: 0.64 sq mi (1.66 km^{2})
  - Land: 0.63 sq mi (1.63 km^{2})
  - Water: 0.012 sq mi (0.03 km^{2})
- Elevation: 1,486 ft (453 m)

Population (2020)
  - Total: 686
  - Density: 1,089.6/sq mi (420.68/km^{2})
- Time zone: UTC-6 (Central (CST))
  - Summer (DST): UTC-5 (CDT)
- ZIP code: 56138
- Area code: 507
- FIPS code: 27-29204
- GNIS feature ID: 2394383
- Website: https://www.hillsmn.com/

Hills is a city in Rock County, Minnesota, United States. Located approximately four miles (6 km) from the South Dakota border and two miles (3 km) from the Iowa border, it is the southwesternmost city in Minnesota. The population was 686 at the 2020 census.

== Geography ==
According to the United States Census Bureau, the city has a total area of 0.54 square miles (1.40 km^{2}); 0.53 square miles (1.37 km^{2}) is land and 0.01 square miles (0.03 km^{2}) is water. The landscape is flat with some gently rolling hills; however, the town's name does not derive from a particular topographical feature. The town includes two parks, Jacobson Park and the Rez. The Rez is a man made reservoir that is used for swimming, fishing and outdoor recreation. A gravel path circles the Rez (reservoir) and there are two small playgrounds. Multiple campsites and a cabin are also on the property as well as a disc golf course.

== Demographics ==
Historical population
Census	Pop.	Note	%±
1910	398		—
1920	418		5.0%
1930	407		−2.6%
1940	450		10.6%
1950	520		15.6%
1960	516		−0.8%
1970	571		10.7%
1980	598		4.7%
1990	607		1.5%
2000	565		−6.9%
2010	686		21.4%
2020	686		0.0%
U.S. Decennial Census

=== 2010 census ===
As of the census of 2010, there were 686 people, 263 households, and 171 families residing in the city. The population density was 1,294.3 inhabitants per square mile (499.7/km^{2}). There were 286 housing units at an average density of 539.6 per square mile (208.3/km^{2}). The racial makeup of the city was 98.0% White, 0.4% African American, 0.1% Asian, 0.1% Pacific Islander, 0.3% from other races, and 1.0% from two or more races. Hispanic or Latino of any race were 1.0% of the population.

There were 263 households, of which 32.3% had children under the age of 18 living with them, 54.0% were married couples living together, 6.5% had a female householder with no husband present, 4.6% had a male householder with no wife present, and 35.0% were non-families. 29.7% of all households were made up of individuals, and 17.5% had someone living alone who was 65 years of age or older. The average household size was 2.43 and the average family size was 2.95.

The median age in the city was 41.5 years. 24.5% of residents were under the age of 18; 5.8% were between the ages of 18 and 24; 22.7% were from 25 to 44; 21.7% were from 45 to 64; and 25.4% were 65 years of age or older. The gender makeup of the city was 48.0% male and 52.0% female.

=== 2000 census ===
As of the census of 2000, there were 565 people, 230 households, and 149 families residing in the city. The population density was 1,160.7 inhabitants per square mile (448.1/km^{2}). There were 244 housing units at an average density of 501.2 per square mile (193.5/km^{2}). The racial makeup of the city was 99.29% White, 0.18% African American, 0.18% Asian, 0.18% Pacific Islander, and 0.18% from two or more races. Hispanic or Latino of any race were 0.35% of the population.

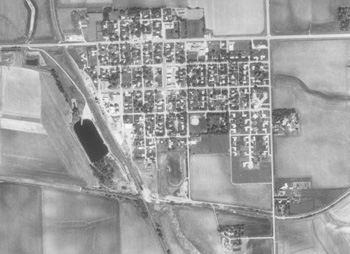
an aerial photo of Hills

There were 230 households, out of which 27.0% had children under the age of 18 living with them, 55.2% were married couples living together, 7.4% had a female householder with no husband present, and 34.8% were non-families. 33.0% of all households were made up of individuals, and 19.6% had someone living alone who was 65 years of age or older. The average household size was 2.23 and the average family size was 2.81.

In the city, the population was spread out, with 20.5% under the age of 18, 6.7% from 18 to 24, 22.1% from 25 to 44, 21.8% from 45 to 64, and 28.8% who were 65 years of age or older. The median age was 46 years. For every 100 females, there were 87.7 males. For every 100 females age 18 and over, there were 82.5 males.

The median income for a household in the city was $33,125, and the median income for a family was $43,750. Males had a median income of $30,000 versus $21,833 for females. The per capita income for the city was $15,824. About 2.8% of families and 5.6% of the population were below the poverty line, including 3.1% of those under age 18 and 11.6% of those age 65 or over.

== History ==
Hills was platted in 1889, and named for Frederick C. Hills, a railroad official. A post office has been in operation at Hills since 1890. Hills was incorporated in 1904.

== Agriculture ==
The local economy is largely dependent upon agriculture; corn and soybeans are the region's primary cash crops.

== Education ==
The Hills school system consolidated with the Beaver Creek school system in 1965 when it became Hills-Beaver Creek (H-BC). The high school, which houses grades 6-12 is located in Hills; the elementary school, with grades PreK-5 is located in Beaver Creek. There were 294 students enrolled in grades K-12 in 2005. The school mascot is the patriots. The school colors are red, white and blue. In 1990, the Hills-Beaver Creek Patriots football team won the 9-Man Football Minnesota State High School League Championship. The game was played at the Hubert H. Humphrey Metrodome. In 2019, Hills-Beaver Creek Elementary School was awarded the National Blue Ribbon School Award which is awarded to honor the highest performing schools in the nation. In 2020 the Associated Press named the Hills-Beaver Creek Patriots football team Mythical State Champions after winning their 9-Man Section Football Championship to cap off the pandemic shortened season. In 2024, Hills-Beaver Creek Secondary School was awarded the National Blue Ribbon School - Exemplary High Performing School. After losing the 9-Player State Championship game in 2024, earning them Runner-Up honors, the Hills-Beaver Creek Patriots football team made it back to U.S. Bank Stadium the following season and won the 2025 MSHSL 9-Player State Championship. Four months later, the HBC Patriots Boys Basketball team returned to Minneapolis to claim the 2026 Class A Minnesota State Championship for the first time in its program history. HBC defeated JWP 64-33 at the historic Williams Arena at the University of Minnesota.

== Politics ==
Hills is located in Minnesota's 1st congressional district, represented by Mankato educator Jim Hagedorn, a Republican. At the state level, Hills is located in Senate District 22, represented by Republican Bill Weber, and in House District 22A, represented by Republican Joe Schomacker.
