= List of bridges on the National Register of Historic Places in South Dakota =

This is a list of bridges and tunnels on the National Register of Historic Places in the U.S. state of South Dakota.

| Name | Image | Built | Listed | Location | County | Type |
|---|---|---|---|---|---|---|
| Beaver Creek Bridge | Beaver Creek Bridge | 1929 | 1984-08-08 | Hot Springs; 43°35′4″N 103°29′19″W | Custer | open spandrel concrete arch |
| Bridge at Iverson Crossing | Bridge at Iverson Crossing | 1897 | 1996-07-17 | Brandon; 43°31′44″N 96°36′2″W | Minnehaha | Parker style PC with Pony |
| Bridge No. 63-137-090-Parker | | 1940 | 1999-08-05 | Parker; 43°22′24″N 97°7′44″W | Turner | Stone Arch |
| Buffalo Gap Cheyenne River Bridge | | 1932 | 1988-02-08 | Buffalo Gap | Custer | Parker Through Truss |
| Capa Bridge | | 1919 | 1993-12-09 | Murdo; 44°4′12″N 100°56′10″W | Jones | Pratt Truss |
| Centerville Township Bridge Number S-18 | | 1938 | 2000-10-30 | Centerville; 43°7′37″N 97°2′20″W | Turner | Stone arch |
| Chamberlain Bridge | Chamberlain Bridge | 1925, 1953 | 2001-09-14 | Chamberlain; 43°48′41″N 99°20′14″W | Brule | Pennsylvania through truss |
| Cherry Rock Park Bridge | Cherry Rock Park Bridge | 1902 | 2003-05-30 | Sioux Falls; 43°32′16″N 96°42′17″W | Minnehaha | Pratt Pony Truss and Parker |
| Chicago and North Western Railroad Bridge | Chicago and North Western Railroad Bridge | 1906, 1907 | 1998-11-19 | Pierre; 44°22′25″N 100°22′12″W | Hughes | Pennsylvania truss bridge |
| Childstown Township Bridge Number S-15 | | 1940 | 2000-10-30 | Childstown; 43°17′58″N 97°12′40″W | Turner | Stone arch |
| Chilson Bridge | | 1929 | 1993-12-09 | Edgemont; 43°19′47″N 103°44′2″W | Fall River | Pratt deck truss |
| Dalton Township Bridge | | 1936 | 1999-12-09 | Marion; 43°26′59″N 97°16′49″W | Turner | Stone arch |
| Daneville Township Bridge No. E-26 | | 1935 | 1999-12-09 | Viborg; 43°6′4″N 97°3′43″W | Turner | Stone arch |
| Dell Rapids Bridge | Dell Rapids Bridge | 1929 | 1999-08-05 | Dell Rapids; 43°49′12″N 96°42′35″W | Minnehaha | Concrete Girder |
| Eighth Street Bridge | Eighth Street Bridge | 1912 | 1993-12-09 | Sioux Falls; 43°32′55″N 96°43′31″W | Minnehaha | arch |
| Forest City Bridge | | 1957, 1959 | 2001-11-08 | La Plant; 45°1′25″N 100°17′45″W | Dewey | Through truss |
| Germantown Township Bridge S-29 | | 1942 | 2000-10-30 | Germantown; 43°21′32″N 97°0′29″W | Turner | Stone arch |
| Hay Creek Bridge | | 1941 | 1993-12-09 | Belle Fourche; 44°39′54″N 103°51′5″W | Butte | Multi-plate arch |
| Kemp Avenue Bridge | | 1935 | 1993-12-09 | Watertown; 44°54′11″N 97°9′1″W | Codington | Multi-plate arch |
| Lewis Bridge | Lewis Bridge | 1922 | 1992-06-29 | Wewela; 42°59′53″N 99°38′8″W | Tripp | Pratt pony truss |
| Meridian Bridge | Meridian Bridge | 1924 | 1993-06-17 | Yankton; 42°51′35″N 97°23′37″W | Yankton | Prat vertical-lift truss |
| Miller Ree Creek Bridge | | 1914 | 1988-08-25 | Miller; 44°31′2″N 98°59′54″W | Hand | Marsh Rainbow Arch Bridge |
| Minnesela Bridge | | 1917 | 1993-12-09 | Belle Fourche; 44°38′28″N 103°49′19″W | Butte | |
| Newell Depot Bridge | | 1920 | 1999-08-05 | Newell; 44°42′20″N 103°29′10″W | Butte | bedstead pony truss |
| Old Cochrane Road Bridge | | ca. 1910 | 1993-12-09 | Brandt; 44°42′3″N 96°29′15″W | Deuel | Stone Arch |
| Old Yankton Bridge | Old Yankton Bridge | 1895 | 1999-08-05 | Sioux Falls; 43°30′5″N 96°45′3″W | Minnehaha | Parker Through Truss |
| Palisades Bridge | Palisades Bridge | 1908 | 1999-06-03 | Garretson; 43°41′20″N 96°31′5″W | Minnehaha | Pratt pin connected truss |
| Pig Tail Bridge | Pig Tail Bridge | ca. 1930, 1940 | 1995-04-07 | Hot Springs; 43°36′4″N 103°29′38″W | Custer | Rustic |
| Pine Street Bridge | | 1912 | 2000-01-14 | Yankton; 42°52′27.3″N 97°23′19.2″W | Yankton | Concrete Deck Arch |
| Red Shirt Bridge | | 1943, 1944 | 1993-12-09 | Red Shirt; 43°40′3″N 102°52′13″W | Custer | Steel stringer |
| Old Redwater Bridge | | 1910 | 1993-12-09 | Spearfish; 44°35′24″N 103°51′22″W | Lawrence | Pratt Truss |
| Salem Township Bridge Number E-1 | | by 1940 | 2000-10-30 | Salem; 43°14′52″N 97°16′45″W | Turner | Stone arch |
| South Dakota Department of Transportation Bridge No. 14-130-176 | | by 1910 | 2001-11-08 | Vermillion; 42°49′47″N 96°54′15″W | Clay | Warren through truss |
| South Dakota Department of Transportation Bridge No. 14-133-170 | | by 1910 | 2001-11-08 | Vermillion; 42°50′15″N 96°53′44″W | Clay | Warren through truss |
| South Dakota Department of Transportation Bridge No. 06-129-020 | | 1903 | 1999-11-30 | Bruce; 44°30′53″N 96°52′11″W | Brookings | Half-hip Pratt pony truss |
| South Dakota Department of Transportation Bridge No. 06-142-190 | | by 1910 | 1999-11-30 | Brookings; 44°16′6″N 96°50′35″W | Brookings | Warren through truss |
| South Dakota Department of Transportation Bridge No. 14-060-032 | | ca. 1916 | 2000-01-28 | Wakonda; 43°2′18″N 97°2′30″W | Clay | Concrete Deck Arch |
| South Dakota Department of Transportation Bridge No. 14-088-170 | | ca. 1890 | 2000-01-14 | Vermillion; 42°50′14″N 96°59′17″W | Clay | Pratt Through Truss |
| South Dakota Department of Transportation Bridge No. 14-090-042 | | 1912 | 2000-01-14 | Wakonda; 43°1′23″N 96°58′56″W | Clay | Warren Pony Truss w/ polygon |
| South Dakota Department of Transportation Bridge No. 50-193-086 | | ca. 1910 | 2000-01-14 | Midway; 43°43′12″N 96°44′54″W | Minnehaha | Pratt Through Truss |
| South Dakota Department of Transportation Bridge No. 51-051-000 | | 1902 | 2000-01-14 | Lake Campbell Resort; 44°11′44″N 96°47′4″W | Moody | Pratt Half-Hip Pony Truss |
| South Dakota Department of Transportation Bridge No. 51-102-010 | | 1915 | 2000-01-14 | Riverview Township; 44°10′54″N 96°41′18″W | Moody | Concrete Deck Arch |
| South Dakota Department of Transportation Bridge No. 52-575-383 | | 1916 | 1999-12-17 | Caputa; 43°58′1″N 102°54′31″W | Pennington | Concrete barrel deck arch |
| South Dakota Department of Transportation Bridge No. 52-824-300 | | 1940 | 1999-12-17 | Wasta; 44°4′52″N 102°24′4″W | Pennington | Warren deck truss |
| South Dakota Department of Transportation Bridge No. 55-030-418 | | 1912 | 1999-12-09 | Ortley; 45°19′48″N 97°9′53″W | Roberts | Concrete slab |
| South Dakota Department of Transportation Bridge No. 63-016-150 | | 1935 | 1999-11-19 | Marion; 43°17′6″N 97°22′0″W | Turner | Stone arch |
| South Dakota Department of Transportation Bridge No. 63-052-030 | | 1913 | 1999-09-29 | Marion; 43°27′32″N 97°17′41″W | Turner | Warren pony truss |
| South Dakota Department of Transportation Bridge No. 63-132-040 | | 1939 | 1999-09-29 | Parker; 43°26′42″N 97°8′9″W | Turner | Stone arch |
| South Dakota Department of Transportation Bridge No. 63-160-056 | | 1905 | 1999-11-19 | Parker; 43°25′13″N 96°57′31″W | Turner | Pratt Through Truss |
| South Dakota Department of Transportation Bridge No. 63-197-130 | | 1906 | 1999-09-29 | Davis; 43°19′0″N 97°0′43″W | Turner | Pratt through truss |
| South Dakota Department of Transportation Bridge No. 63-198-181 | | 1909 | 1999-09-29 | Davis; 43°14′31″N 97°0′12″W | Turner | Pratt through truss |
| South Dakota Department of Transportation Bridge No. 63-210-282 | | 1909 | 1999-09-29 | Centerville; 43°5′48″N 96°58′51″W | Turner | Pratt through truss |
| South Dakota Department of Transportation Bridge No. 34-202-072 | | 1941 | 2002-05-30 | Parkston; 43°23′54″N 97°42′48″W | Hutchinson | Concrete Deck Girder |
| South Dakota Department of Transportation Bridge No. 42-200-125 | | by 1900 | 2002-05-30 | Canton; 43°19′26″N 96°31′42″W | Lincoln | Pratt Through-truss |
| South Dakota Department of Transportation Bridge No. 51-124-136 | | by 1922 | 2001-02-09 | Egan; 43°59′54″N 96°38′19″W | Moody | Parker through truss |
| South Dakota Department of Transportation Bridge No. 34-120-194 | | 1912 | 2002-05-30 | Tripp; 43°13′2″N 97°52′19″W | Hutchinson | Half-hip Pratt Pony truss |
| South Dakota Department of Transportation Bridge No. 34-140-046 | | 1939 | 2002-05-30 | Milltown; 43°26′1″N 97°50′16″W | Hutchinson | Concrete/Steel stringer |
| South Dakota Department of Transportation Bridge No. 50-196-104 | | 1903 | 2000-02-10 | Sverdrup Township; 43°41′45″N 96°44′15″W | Minnehaha | Pratt Through Truss |
| South Dakota Department of Transportation Bridge No. 03-020-008 | | ca. 1920 | 1993-12-09 | Wessington; 44°37′15″N 98°39′56″W | Beadle | |
| South Dakota Department of Transportation Bridge No. 03-327-230 | | 1913 | removed 1993-12-09 | Cavour; 44°17′49″N 98°2′24″W | Beadle | Queen post pony Truss |
| South Dakota Department of Transportation Bridge No. 03-338-100 | | 1917 | 1993-12-09 | Cavour; 44°29′13″N 98°1′0″W | Beadle | Warren Pony truss |
| South Dakota Department of Transportation Bridge No. 05-028-200 | | 1905 | 1993-12-09 | Perkins; 42°52′48″N 98°6′48″W | Bon Homme | Pratt Pony truss |
| South Dakota Department of Transportation Bridge No. 05-032-170 | | 1912 | 1993-12-09 | Avon; 42°55′25″N 98°6′22″W | Bon Homme | Pratt through truss |
| South Dakota Department of Transportation Bridge No. 05-138-080 | | 1904 | 1993-12-09 | Tyndall; 43°3′13″N 97°53′39″W | Bon Homme | Bedstead |
| South Dakota Department of Transportation Bridge No. 05-255-130 | | 1935 | 1993-12-09 | Tabor; 42°58′52″N 97°39′53″W | Bon Homme | slab |
| South Dakota Department of Transportation Bridge No. 07-009-060 | | 1938 | 2000-03-09 | Frederick; 45°51′7″N 98°42′22″W | Brown | Concrete Slab |
| South Dakota Department of Transportation Bridge No. 07-220-454 | | 1921 | 2000-03-09 | Stratford; 45°16′13″N 98°17′16″W | Brown | Bedstead pony Truss |
| South Dakota Department of Transportation Bridge No. 07-268-030 | | 1912, 1968 | 2000-03-09 | Hecal; 45°53′35″N 98°10′33″W | Brown | Pratt pony truss |
| South Dakota Department of Transportation Bridge No. 07-304-414 | | 1921 | 2000-03-09 | Ferney; 45°20′19″N 98°5′43″W | Brown | Concrete culvert |
| South Dakota Department of Transportation Bridge No. 10-109-360 | | 1906, 1907 | 1993-12-09 | Belle Fourche; 44°41′27″N 103°49′52″W | Butte | Pratt Truss |
| South Dakota Department of Transportation Bridge No. 10-270-338 | | 1910 | 2000-02-18 | Newell; 44°43′21″N 103°30′22″W | Butte | Lattice Pony Truss |
| South Dakota Department of Transportation Bridge No. 15-210-136 | | 1917 | 1993-12-09 | Watertown; 44°57′11″N 97°3′55″W | Codington | |
| South Dakota Department of Transportation Bridge No. 16-570-054 | | 1911 | 1993-12-09 | McLaughlin; 45°52′13″N 100°49′52″W | Corson | King post, pony truss |
| South Dakota Department of Transportation Bridge No. 17-289-107 | | 1937 | 1993-12-09 | Custer; 43°42′56″N 103°28′47″W | Custer | Concrete barrel deck arch |
| South Dakota Department of Transportation Bridge No. 18-040-137 | | 1913 | 1993-12-09 | Mitchell; 43°38′52″N 98°14′45″W | Davison | Pratt pony truss |
| South Dakota Department of Transportation Bridge No. 18-060-202 | | 1912 | 1993-12-09 | Mitchell; 43°36′59″N 98°12′11″W | Davison | Warren Pony Truss |
| South Dakota Department of Transportation Bridge No. 18-100-052 | | 1915 | 1993-12-09 | Loomis; 43°44′55″N 98°6′22″W | Davison | Warren pony truss |
| South Dakota Department of Transportation Bridge No. 20-153-210 | | 1908, 1960 | 1993-12-09 | Brandt; 44°40′27″N 96°34′28″W | Deuel | Pratt pony truss |
| South Dakota Department of Transportation Bridge No. 25-218-141 | | 1920 | 1993-12-09 | Faulkton; 45°3′50″N 99°7′45″W | Faulk | Steel stringer with concrete |
| South Dakota Department of Transportation Bridge No. 25-380-142 | | 1902, 1955 | 1993-12-09 | Zell; 45°2′20″N 98°47′53″W | Faulk | Pratt Truss |
| South Dakota Department of Transportation Bridge No. 29-221-060 | | 1894 | 1993-12-09 | Castlewood; 44°42′59″N 97°2′41″W | Hamlin | Pratt Warren Truss |
| South Dakota Department of Transportation Bridge No. 29-279-010 | | 1903 | 1993-12-09 | Castlewood; 44°47′24″N 96°55′35″W | Hamlin | Warren Truss |
| South Dakota Department of Transportation Bridge No. 30-257-400 | | 1917 | 1993-12-09 | Miller; 44°18′17″N 98°47′8″W | Hand | Stringer |
| South Dakota Department of Transportation Bridge No. 39-006-070 | | 1911 | 1993-12-09 | Iroquois; 44°26′27″N 97°50′26″W | Kingsbury | arch |
| South Dakota Department of Transportation Bridge No. 44-212-090 | | 1916 | 1993-12-09 | Montrose; 43°42′59″N 97°11′14″W | McCook | |
| South Dakota Department of Transportation Bridge No. 47-151-389 | | ca. 1917 | 1993-12-09 | Sturgis; 44°28′32″N 97°15′57″W | Meade | barrel deck arch |
| South Dakota Department of Transportation Bridge No. 48-244-204 | | 1936 | 1993-12-09 | White River; 43°34′29″N 100°45′39″W | Mellette | |
| South Dakota Department of Transportation Bridge No. 49-095-190 | | 1917 | 1993-12-09 | Howard; 43°55′19″N 97°39′35″W | Miner | |
| South Dakota Department of Transportation Bridge No. 56-090-096 | | 1912 | 1993-12-09 | Forestburg; 44°3′40″N 98°9′3″W | Sanborn | Warren Pony Truss |
| South Dakota Department of Transportation Bridge No. 58-010-376 | | | 1993-12-09 | Tulare; 44°41′54″N 98°41′11″W | Spink | |
| South Dakota Department of Transportation Bridge No. 58-021-400 | | 1921 | 1993-12-09 | Tulare; 44°39′46″N 98°39′51″W | Spink | Bedsted Pony Truss |
| South Dakota Department of Transportation Bridge No. 58-025-370 | | 1903 | 1993-12-09 | Tulare; 44°42′24″N 98°39′19″W | Spink | Pratt Pony Truss |
| South Dakota Department of Transportation Bridge No. 58-062-270 | | 1912 | 1993-12-09 | Redfield; 44°51′2″N 98°34′54″W | Spink | Warren Pony Truss |
| South Dakota Department of Transportation Bridge No. 58-120-231 | | 1904 | 1993-12-09 | Redfield; 45°57′19″N 98°28′16″W | Spink | Pratt Through Truss |
| South Dakota Department of Transportation Bridge No. 58-140-224 | | 1919 | 1993-12-09 | Redfield; 45°53′14″N 98°25′27″W | Spink | Parker Truss |
| South Dakota Department of Transportation Bridge No. 58-218-360 | | 1910 | 1993-12-09 | Frankfort; 44°43′11″N 98°15′59″W | Spink | Pratt Truss |
| South Dakota Department of Transportation Bridge No. 62-220-512 | | 1914 | 1993-12-09 | Wewela; 43°2′12″N 99°48′37″W | Tripp | Pratt Pony Truss |
| South Dakota Department of Transportation Bridge No. 64-061-199 | | ca. 1910 | 1993-12-09 | Elk Point; 42°47′39″N 96°41′8″W | Union | Pratt Truss |
| Split Rock Park Bridge | Split Rock Bridge | 1936 | 1993-12-09 | Garretson; 43°43′20″N 96°30′2″W | Minnehaha | Stone Arch |
| Spring Valley Township Bridge No. E-31 | | 1938 | 1999-12-09 | Viborg; 43°10′27″N 97°15′33″W | Turner | Stone arch |
| Stamford Bridge | | 1930 | 1993-12-09 | Cedar Butte; 43°51′4″N 101°2′20″W | Mellette | Bedstead Pony Truss |
| Stonelake Bridge | | ca. 1910, 1972 | 1986-04-30 | Newell; 44°43′17″N 97°30′24″W | Butte | Pony truss |
| Turner Township Bridge No. SE-18 | | 1942 | 2000-11-15 | Centerville; 43°12′48″N 97°1′21″W | Turner | Stone arch |
| Vale Bridge | | 1906 | 1999-08-05 | Vale; 44°37′45″N 103°23′13″W | Butte | Pratt through truss |
| Vale Cut Off Belle Fourche River Bridge | | 1912 | 1986-04-30 | Belle Fourche; 44°40′17″N 97°29′32″W | Butte | Pratt through truss |
| Belle Fourche River Bridge | | ca. 1913 | removed 1996-08-01 | Belle Fourche | Butte | Pratt through truss |
| Bridge No. 50-122-155-Brandon vicinity | | 1925 | removed 2008-03-26 | Brandon Township | Minnehaha | Bedstead Pony Truss |
| Esmond Bridge | | 1906 | removed 1999-12-15 | De Smet | Kingsbury | Pratt Truss |
| Fruitdale Bridge | | ca. 1913 | removed 1996-08-01 | Fruitdale | Butte | Pratt through truss |
| Hall Bridge | | 1893, 1904 | removed 2008-03-26 | Ashton | Spink | Pratt Through Truss |
| Larson Bridge | | 1917 | removed 1999-12-15 | Watertown | Codington | |
| Nisland Bridge | | ca. 1910 | removed 2008-03-26 | Nisland | Butte | Pratt through truss |
| Olson Bridge | | ca. 1906 | removed 2008-03-26 | Belle Fourche | Butte | Pratt through truss |
| Sioux River Bridge | | 1939 | removed 2008-03-26 | Trent | Moody | Concrete T-Beam |
| South Dakota Department of Transportation Bridge No. 02-007-220 | | 1908 | removed 2008-03-26 | White Lake | Aurora | Warren Pony Truss |
| South Dakota Department of Transportation Bridge No. 06-131-040 | | 1900 | removed 2008-03-26 | Bruce | Brookings | Pratt pony truss |
| South Dakota Department of Transportation Bridge No. 14-105-209 | | 1933 | removed 2008-03-26 | Vermillion | Clay | Steel Stringer |
| South Dakota Department of Transportation Bridge No. 14-120-222 | | 1906 | removed 2008-03-26 | Wakonda | Clay | Half-hip Pratt pony truss |
| South Dakota Department of Transportation Bridge No. 42-103-207 | | ca. 1890 | removed 2008-03-26 | Beresford | Lincoln | Pratt Pony Truss |
| South Dakota Department of Transportation Bridge No. 50-192-132 | | 1906 | removed 2008-03-26 | Renner | Minnehaha | Pratt Through Truss |
| South Dakota Department of Transportation Bridge No. 51-140-078 | | 1910 | removed 2008-03-26 | Flandreau | Moody | Pratt Through Truss |
| South Dakota Department of Transportation Bridge No. 53-101-196 | | 1912 | removed 2008-03-26 | Bison | Perkins | Pratt through truss |
| South Dakota Department of Transportation Bridge No. 63-177-160 | | 1912 | removed 2008-03-26 | Hurley | Turner | Warren pony truss |
| South Dakota Department of Transportation Bridge No. 63-186-020 | | 1935 | removed 2008-03-26 | Parker | Turner | Stone arch |
| South Dakota Department of Transportation Bridge No. 07-091-330 | | 1938 | removed 2008-03-26 | Aberdeen | Brown | Steel Stringer |
| South Dakota Department of Transportation Bridge No. 10-112-355 | | 1906, 1907, 1910 | removed 1999-12-15 | Belle Fourche | Butte | Pratt Truss |
| South Dakota Department of Transportation Bridge No. 12-503-230 | | 1912 | removed 1999-12-15 | Wagner | Charles Mix | Riveted Warren pony truss |
| South Dakota Department of Transportation Bridge No. 18-142-150 | | 1915 | removed 1999-12-15 | Mitchell | Davison | Concrete deck girder |
| South Dakota Department of Transportation Bridge No. 27-000-201 | | 1920 | removed 2008-03-26 | Dallas | Gregory | Steel thru plate girder |
| South Dakota Department of Transportation Bridge No. 27-060-298 | | 1915 | removed 1999-12-15 | Gregory | Gregory | Pratt pony truss |
| South Dakota Department of Transportation Bridge No. 31-115-110 | | 1912 | removed 2008-03-26 | Fulton | Hanson | Warren Pony Truss |
| South Dakota Department of Transportation Bridge No. 39-176-100 | | 1914 | removed 1999-12-15 | De Smet | Kingsbury | |
| South Dakota Department of Transportation Bridge No. 44-028-220 | | 1916 | removed 2008-03-26 | Bridgewater | McCook | |
| South Dakota Department of Transportation Bridge No. 47-215-363 | | 1939 | removed 1999-12-15 | Sturgis | Meade | Parker Truss |
| South Dakota Department of Transportation Bridge No. 50-122-155 | | 1929 | 2000-01-28 removed 2008-3-26 | Brandon Twp. 43°37′25″N 96°53′8″W | Minnehaha | Bedstead Pony Truss |
| South Dakota Department of Transportation Bridge No. 50-200-035 | Bridge No. 50-200-035 | 1900, 1935 | removed 1999-12-15 | Dell Rapids | Minnehaha | Lattice Truss |
| South Dakota Department of Transportation Bridge No. 56-117-123 | | 1897, 1906 | removed 2008-03-26 | Forestburg | Sanborn | Warren Truss |
| South Dakota Department of Transportation Bridge No. 56-174-090 | | 1905 | removed 1999-12-15 | Artesian | Sanborn | Bedstead Pony Truss |
| Summit Avenue Viaduct | | 1936 | 2008-03-26; 2008-2-26 | Sioux Falls; 43°32′28″N 96°44′8″W | Minnehaha | Stringer |
| Van Metre Bridge | | 1908 | removed 2002-02-22 | Murdo | Jones | Pratt Truss |
| Walnut Street Bridge | | 1911 | removed 2008-03-26 | Yankton | Yankton | Concrete Deck Arch |
