= Turner County Highway Department =

Government agency in South Dakota, USA

The Turner County Highway Department and/or its Turner County Highway Superintendent, in Turner County, South Dakota, arranged for the construction of numerous public works.

A number of these are listed on the U.S. National Register of Historic Places.

Works include:

- Bridge No. 63-137-090-Parker, County Road 22 over unnamed stream, Parker, South Dakota (Turner County Highway Department), NRHP-listed
- Centerville Township Bridge Number S-18, 294th Street, Centerville, South Dakota (Turner County Highway Superintendent), NRHP-listed
- Childstown Township Bridge Number S-15, 282nd Street, Childstown, South Dakota (Turner County Highway Superintendent), NRHP-listed
- Dalton Township Bridge, local road over unnamed stream, Marion, South Dakota (Turner County Highway Department), NRHP-listed
- Daneville Township Bridge No. E-26, local road over unnamed stream, Viborg, South Dakota (Turner County Highway Department), NRHP-listed
- Germantown Township Bridge S-29, 278th Street, Germantown, South Dakota (Turner County Highway Superintendent), NRHP-listed
- Salem Township Bridge Number E-1, 446th Street, Salem, South Dakota (Turner County Highway Superintendent), NRHP-listed
- South Dakota Department of Transportation Bridge No. 63-016-150, local road over unnamed creek, Marion, South Dakota (Turner County Highway Department), NRHP-listed
- South Dakota Department of Transportation Bridge No. 63-132-040, local road over unnamed stream, Parker, South Dakota (Turner County Highway Department), NRHP-listed
- Spring Valley Township Bridge No. E-31, local road over unnamed stream, Viborg, South Dakota (Turner County Highway Department), NRHP-listed
- Turner Township Bridge No. SE-18, 459th Street, Centerville, South Dakota (Turner County Highway Superintendent), NRHP-listed
