= National Register of Historic Places listings in Turner County, South Dakota =

Location of Turner County in South Dakota

This is a list of the National Register of Historic Places listings in Turner County, South Dakota.

This is intended to be a complete list of the properties and districts on the National Register of Historic Places in Turner County, South Dakota, United States. The locations of National Register properties and districts for which the latitude and longitude coordinates are included below, may be seen in a map.

There are 31 properties and districts listed on the National Register in the county. Another 2 properties were once listed but have since been removed.

This National Park Service list is complete through NPS recent listings posted September 26, 2025.

== Current listings ==
	Name on the Register	Image	Date listed	Location	City or town	Description
1	Archeological Site 39TU5		February 23, 1984 (#84003417)	Address Restricted	Freeman	
2	Bones Hereford Ranch Sale Barn	Bones Hereford Ranch Sale Barn	December 14, 1995 (#95001472)	45874 268th Street; 43°29′55″N 97°01′17″W	Parker	
3	Bridge No. 63-137-090-Parker	Bridge No. 63-137-090-Parker	August 5, 1999 (#99000951)	County Road 22 over an unnamed stream 43°22′24″N 97°07′44″W	Parker	
4	Brough-Martinson House	Brough-Martinson House	March 30, 1978 (#78002570)	Off Highway 19; 43°16′55″N 97°05′24″W	Hurley	
5	Centerville Township Bridge Number S-18		October 30, 2000 (#00001216)	294th Street; 43°07′37″N 97°02′20″W	Centerville	
6	Childstown Township Bridge Number S-15		October 30, 2000 (#00001217)	282nd Street; 43°17′58″N 97°12′40″W	Childstown	
7	Dalton Township Bridge		December 9, 1999 (#99001439)	Local road over an unnamed stream 43°26′59″N 97°16′49″W	Marion	
8	Daneville Township Bridge No. E-26		December 9, 1999 (#99001441)	Local road over an unnamed stream 43°06′04″N 97°03′43″W	Viborg	
9	Farrar House	Farrar House	March 21, 1978 (#78002571)	Off Highway 19; 43°17′07″N 97°05′25″W	Hurley	
10	Germantown Township Bridge S-29		October 30, 2000 (#00001219)	278th Street; 43°21′32″N 97°00′29″W	Germantown	
11	Glud Theatre		June 8, 2007 (#07000530)	119 North Main Street; 43°10′23″N 97°04′55″W	Viborg	
12	Dr. Harry S. Graves House	Dr. Harry S. Graves House	March 21, 1978 (#78002572)	Center Avenue and Monroe Street; 43°16′59″N 97°05′26″W	Hurley	
13	Tenus Isaac Gunderson House	Tenus Isaac Gunderson House	January 28, 2004 (#03001534)	1041 Washington; 43°07′12″N 96°57′50″W	Centerville	
14	William Higinbotham House	William Higinbotham House	June 6, 2001 (#01000635)	511 Main Street; 43°07′01″N 96°57′20″W	Centerville	
15	Chandler Gray and Mary Abbie Newhall House and Homestead Shack		June 9, 1992 (#92000682)	5 miles west and 4.5 miles south of Parker; 43°20′19″N 97°14′22″W	Parker	
16	Parker Masonic Hall	Parker Masonic Hall	July 28, 2004 (#04000761)	130 South Cherry Avenue; 43°23′55″N 97°08′03″W	Parker	
17	Salem Township Bridge Number E-1		October 30, 2000 (#00001218)	446th Street; 43°14′52″N 97°16′45″W	Salem	
18	South Dakota Department of Transportation Bridge No. 63-016-150		November 19, 1999 (#99001342)	Local road over an unnamed creek 43°17′06″N 97°22′00″W	Marion	
19	South Dakota Department of Transportation Bridge No. 63-052-030		September 29, 1999 (#99001217)	Local road over the West Fork of the Vermillion River; 43°27′32″N 97°17′41″W	Marion	
20	South Dakota Department of Transportation Bridge No. 63-132-040	South Dakota Department of Transportation Bridge No. 63-132-040	September 29, 1999 (#99001215)	Local road over an unnamed stream 43°26′42″N 97°08′09″W	Parker	
21	South Dakota Department of Transportation Bridge No. 63-160-056	South Dakota Department of Transportation Bridge No. 63-160-056	November 19, 1999 (#99001343)	Local road over the East Fork of the Vermillion River; 43°25′21″N 97°04′58″W	Parker	Replaced between 2004 and 2007
22	South Dakota Department of Transportation Bridge No. 63-197-130		September 29, 1999 (#99001210)	Local road over the East Fork of the Vermillion River; 43°19′00″N 97°00′43″W	Davis	
23	South Dakota Department of Transportation Bridge No. 63-198-181		September 29, 1999 (#99001212)	Local road over the East Fork of the Vermillion River; 43°14′31″N 97°00′12″W	Davis	Replace between 2006 and 2008
24	South Dakota Department of Transportation Bridge No. 63-210-282	South Dakota Department of Transportation Bridge No. 63-210-282	September 29, 1999 (#99001216)	Local road over the East Fork of the Vermillion River; 43°05′46″N 96°58′54″W	Centerville	Apparently no longer extant
25	Spring Valley Township Bridge No. E-31		December 9, 1999 (#99001440)	Local road over an unnamed stream 43°10′27″N 97°15′33″W	Viborg	
26	Stidworthy-Kemper House	Stidworthy-Kemper House	June 16, 2022 (#100007796)	218 North Main St. 43°10′23″N 97°04′53″W	Viborg	
27	Thielman-Stoddard House	Thielman-Stoddard House	August 3, 1979 (#79003691)	132 First Street; 43°23′49″N 97°08′17″W	Parker	
28	James S. Thomson House	James S. Thomson House	August 18, 1983 (#83003021)	1121 Washington St. 43°07′12″N 96°57′54″W	Centerville	
29	Turner Township Bridge No. SE-18	Turner Township Bridge No. SE-18	November 15, 2000 (#00001351)	459th St. 43°12′48″N 97°01′21″W	Centerville	
30	Jacob Weins House-Barn		August 13, 1984 (#84003419)	Northwestern corner of the southeastern quadrant of Section 14, T99N, R55W; 43°23′34″N 97°18′27″W	Marion	
31	Wek Farmstead		January 28, 2004 (#03001535)	44227 288th St. 43°12′44″N 97°21′10″W	Freeman	

== Former listings ==
	Name on the Register	Image	Date listed	Date removed	Location	City or town	Description
1	I.O.O.F. Hall, Hurley Lodge No. 75		July 1, 1982 (#82003944)	January 12, 1988	Center Ave.	Hurley	
2	South Dakota Department of Transportation Bridge No. 63-177-160		September 29, 1999 (#99001211)	March 26, 2008	Local Road over Turkey Ridge Creek	Hurley	
3	South Dakota Department of Transportation Bridge No. 63-186-020		September 29, 1999 (#99001214)	March 26, 2008	Local Road over Long Creek	Parker	

== See also ==
- List of National Historic Landmarks in South Dakota
- National Register of Historic Places listings in South Dakota
