= South Dakota Department of Transportation Bridge No. 63-160-056 =

- U.S. National Register of Historic Places
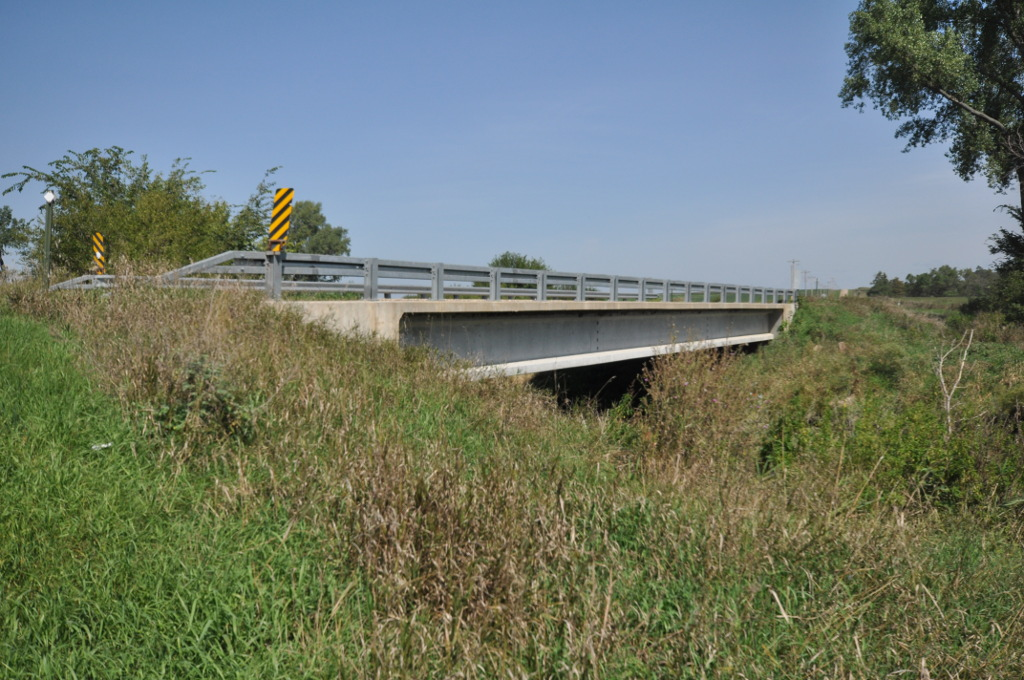
- The c. 2007 replacement bridge

- Location within South Dakota Location within the United States
- Nearest city: Parker, South Dakota
- Coordinates: 43°25′21″N 97°4′58″W
- Area: less than one acre
- Built: 1905
- Built by: Crane, A.J. and Sons
- Architectural style: Pratt Through Truss
- MPS: Historic Bridges in South Dakota MPS
- NRHP reference No.: 99001343
- Added to NRHP: November 19, 1999

The South Dakota Department of Transportation Bridge No. 63-160-056 was a historic truss bridge in rural Turner County, South Dakota, carrying 476th Avenue across the East Fork Vermillion River northeast of Parker. Built in 1905, it was one two surviving bridges built in the county by the J.A. Crane Company of Centerville, South Dakota. It was listed on the National Register of Historic Places in 1999. It was replaced by a modern steel beam bridge in about 2007.

== Description and history ==
The South Dakota Department of Transportation Bridge No. 63-160-045 was located in northeastern Turner County, about 3 miles (4.8 km) east of Parker and 1.4 miles (2.3 km) north. It was a single-span Pratt through truss structure, carrying 476th Avenue across the East Branch of the Vermilion River. The trusses rested on rubblestone abutments, with concrete tops that had shorted right-angled wings. The trusses spanned 105 feet (32 m), and consisted of steel members assembled with pin connections. Rolled I-beams riveted to the trusses by means of hanger plates provide support for stringers and bridge decking.

The bridge was built in 1905 by the J.A. Crane Company of Centerville, South Dakota. It was one of only two bridges known to be built by that company, both of which were located in Turner County. Crane bid on and built bridges in both Turner and Clay Counties, but is otherwise poorly documented. Locally manufactured metal truss bridges were relatively rare at the time, because bridge construction was dominated by out-of-state firms. Sometime between 2004 and 2007 the bridge, which was in deteriorating condition, was replaced by a modern steel girder bridge.

== See also ==
- National Register of Historic Places listings in Turner County, South Dakota
- List of bridges on the National Register of Historic Places in South Dakota
