= Dalton Township Bridge =

- U.S. National Register of Historic Places
- Location within South Dakota Location within the United States
- Nearest city: Marion, South Dakota
- Coordinates: 43°26′59″N 97°16′49″W
- Area: less than one acre
- Built: 1936
- Built by: Turner County Highway Department
- Architectural style: Stone arch
- MPS: Historic Bridges in South Dakota MPS
- NRHP reference No.: 99001439
- Added to NRHP: December 9, 1999

The Dalton Township Bridge is a historic bridge over an unnamed stream on 446th Avenue in rural Turner County, South Dakota, north of Marion. Built in 1936, it is one of a modest number of bridges surviving in the county that was built with New Deal funding. It was listed on the National Register of Historic Places in 2000.

== Description and history ==
The Dalton Township Bridge is located in rural northwestern Turner County, about 2 miles (3.2 km) north of Marion. It carries 446th Avenue, a rural dirt road, across an unnamed stream between 271st and 272nd Streets, a short way south of its crossing of the West Fork Vermilion River. It is a small double-arch stone structure, with two arches each 10 feet (3.0 m) in length and 4 feet (1.2 m) in height. A headwall rises above the arch on each side, and extends into angled wing walls. It is built out of local split fieldstone, mostly granite and gneiss, with crudely shaped voussoirs.

This bridge is one of 180 stone arch bridges built in Turner County as part of a New Deal-era federal jobs program. The county administration was able to build stone bridges at a lower cost than then-conventional steel beam bridges because of the availability of experienced stone workers, and the federal subsidy to the wages they were paid. The county was responsible for supervising the work crews and providing the building materials. This bridge was built in 1936 by a county crew to a standardized state design.

== See also ==
- National Register of Historic Places listings in Turner County, South Dakota
- List of bridges on the National Register of Historic Places in South Dakota
