= South Dakota Department of Transportation Bridge No. 63-197-130 =

- U.S. National Register of Historic Places
- Location within South Dakota Location within the United States
- Nearest city: Davis, South Dakota
- Coordinates: 43°19′0″N 97°0′43″W
- Area: less than one acre
- Built: 1906
- Built by: Iowa Bridge Co.
- Architectural style: Pratt through truss
- MPS: Historic Bridges in South Dakota MPS
- NRHP reference No.: 99001210
- Added to NRHP: September 29, 1999

The South Dakota Department of Transportation Bridge No. 63-197-130 is a historic bridge in rural Turner County, South Dakota, carrying 281st Street across the East Fork Vermillion River north of Davis. Built in 1906, it is the oldest surviving bridge built for the county by the Iowa Bridge Company. It was listed on the National Register of Historic Places in 1999.

== Description and history ==
The South Dakota Department of Transportation Bridge No. 63-197-130 is located in eastern Turner County, about 3 miles (4.8 km) north of Davis and 0.5 miles (0.80 km) west. It is a six-span structure, carrying 281st Street across the East Branch of the Vermilion River. between 450th and 460th Avenues. Five of the spans are timber stringer approach spans, four east of the main span and one to its west. The main span is a Pratt through truss, 75 feet (23 m) in length. Its western abutment is a timber trestle, while the eastern one is of concrete construction with fieldstone wing walls. The truss consists of pin-connected elements, and the floor decking consists of timbers laid over steel I-beams.

The bridge was built in 1906 by the Iowa Bridge Company of Des Moines, Iowa. The county had a contract with that company to provide its steel truss bridges between 1905 and 1911, apparently as part of a common but illegal practice of "pooling", in which companies divided the state into areas where they did not compete against one another. Of the four surviving Iowa Bridge Company bridges surveyed in the county in the late 1990s, this one is the oldest.

== See also ==
- National Register of Historic Places listings in Turner County, South Dakota
- List of bridges on the National Register of Historic Places in South Dakota
