= Bridge No. 63-137-090-Parker =

- U.S. National Register of Historic Places
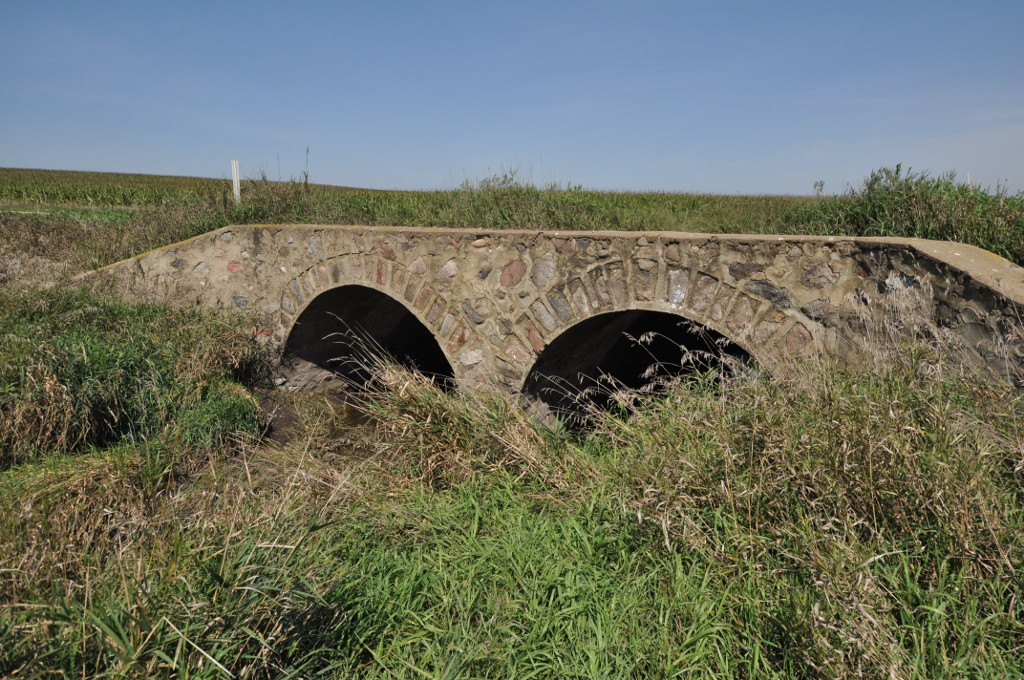

- Location within South Dakota Location within the United States
- Nearest city: Parker, South Dakota
- Coordinates: 43°22′22.3″N 97°7′44.9″W
- Area: less than one acre
- Built: 1940
- Built by: Turner County Highway Department
- Architectural style: Stone Arch
- MPS: Historic Bridges in South Dakota MPS
- NRHP reference No.: 99000951
- Added to NRHP: August 5, 1999

The Bridge No. 63-137-90 is a historic bridge near Parker in rural Turner County, South Dakota. It was built sometime between 1934 and 1936, and is one of a large number of surviving stone bridges built as part of federal jobs programs in the county. It was listed on the National Register of Historic Places in 1999 as Bridge No. 63-137-090-Parker.

== Description and history ==
Bridge No. 63-137-090 is located in north central Turner County, a rural county in eastern South Dakota. It is located on 277th Street, about 2 miles (3.2 km) south of Parker, between 453rd and 454th Avenues. It is a two-arch stone structure, about 25 feet (7.6 m) long, built out of crudely worked fieldstone, predominantly granite. Each arch is about 10 feet (3.0 m) long, with a rise of 4 feet (1.2 m) above that width. It has flared and sloping wing walls, which rise slightly above the road level to form low parapets.

This bridge is one of 65 stone bridges built in Turner County as part of a New Deal-era federal jobs program. The county administration was able to build stone bridges at a lower cost than then-conventional steel beam bridges because of the availability of experienced stone workers, and the federal subsidy to the wages they were paid. The county was responsible for supervising the work crews and providing the building materials. This bridge was built by a county crew, sometime between 1934 and 1936 (records have not survived for an exact construction date).

== See also ==
- National Register of Historic Places listings in Turner County, South Dakota
- List of bridges on the National Register of Historic Places in South Dakota
