= Centerville Township Bridge Number S-18 =

- U.S. National Register of Historic Places
- Location within South Dakota Location within the United States
- Nearest city: Centerville, South Dakota
- Coordinates: 43°7′37″N 97°2′20″W
- Area: less than one acre
- Built: 1938
- Built by: Turner County Highway Department; Works Progress Administration
- Architectural style: Stone arch
- MPS: Stone Arch Culverts in Turner County, South Dakota MPS
- NRHP reference No.: 00001216
- Added to NRHP: October 30, 2000

The Centerville Township Bridge Number S-18 is a historic stone arch bridge on 294th Lane in rural Turner County, South Dakota, west of Centerville. Built in 1938, it is one of a modest number of surviving stone arch bridges built in the county with funding from New Deal jobs programs. It was listed on the National Register of Historic Places in 2000.

== Description and history ==
The Centerville Township Bridge Number S-18 is located in southern Turner County, about 4 miles (6.4 km) west of Centerville, carrying 294th Lane across an unnamed stream east of its junction with 458th Avenue. The bridge is a two-arch stone structure, each arch measuring about 4 feet (1.2 m) in length. It is built out of local fieldstone which is mostly granite, and has wing walls that angle outward and slope downward. The stones are joined by concrete mortar.

This bridge is one of 180 stone arch bridges built in Turner County as part of a New Deal-era federal jobs program. The county administration was able to build stone bridges at a lower cost than then-conventional steel beam bridges because of the availability of experienced stone workers, and the federal subsidy to the wages they were paid. The county was responsible for supervising the work crews and providing the building materials. This bridge was built in 1938 by a county crew.

== See also ==
- National Register of Historic Places listings in Turner County, South Dakota
- List of bridges on the National Register of Historic Places in South Dakota
