= Old Cochrane Road Bridge =

- U.S. National Register of Historic Places
- Location within South Dakota Location within the United States
- Nearest city: Brandt, South Dakota
- Coordinates: 44°42′3″N 96°29′15″W
- Area: less than one acre
- Built: 1910
- Architectural style: Stone Arch
- MPS: Historic Bridges in South Dakota MPS
- NRHP reference No.: 93001268
- Added to NRHP: December 9, 1993

The Old Cochrane Road Bridge is a historic bridge in rural Deuel County, South Dakota. It is a small single-span stone arch bridge, located on an old alignment of the road that circles Lake Cochrane. The bridge spans a stream that enters the lake near its southwestern corner, and is now located on a private lakefront property with a cabin. The bridge is fashioned from a variety of unworked fieldstone, and rises about 4 feet (1.2 m) above grade, with a span of about 6 feet (1.8 m). The bridge's date of construction is unknown, but is surmised to have been in the first decade of the 20th century. It is the only known stone arch bridge to predate the 1930s in the state.

The bridge was listed on the National Register of Historic Places in 1993. It was reported to be in deteriorated condition at that time.

== See also ==
- List of bridges on the National Register of Historic Places in South Dakota
