= South Dakota Dept. of Transportation Bridge No. 48-244-204 =

- U.S. National Register of Historic Places
- Location within South Dakota Location within the United States
- Nearest city: White River, South Dakota
- Coordinates: 43°34′29″N 100°45′39″W
- Area: less than one acre
- Built: 1936
- Built by: South Dakota Department of Transportation
- MPS: Historic Bridges in South Dakota MPS
- NRHP reference No.: 93001305
- Added to NRHP: December 9, 1993

The South Dakota Dept. of Transportation Bridge No. 48-244-204 is a bridge over the Little White River just west of White River, South Dakota. At 314 feet (96 m) in length, it is the longest concrete slab bridge in the state. Built in 1934 to carry South Dakota Highway 44 across the river, it now carries a local road north of that road's current alignment.

The bridge consists of 18 concrete slabs, each 16 feet (4.9 m) in length, resting on a series of concrete piers with wing-walled concrete abutments at both ends. It is closed to the public.

The bridge was listed on the National Register of Historic Places in 1993.

== See also ==
- List of bridges on the National Register of Historic Places in South Dakota
- National Register of Historic Places listings in Mellette County, South Dakota
