= Stamford Bridge (Cedar Butte, South Dakota) =

- U.S. National Register of Historic Places
- Location within South Dakota Location within the United States
- Nearest city: Cedar Butte, South Dakota
- Coordinates: 43°51′4″N 101°2′20″W
- Area: less than one acre
- Built: 1930
- Architectural style: Bedstead Pony Truss
- MPS: Historic Bridges in South Dakota MPS
- NRHP reference No.: 93001304
- Added to NRHP: December 9, 1993

The Stamford Bridge, also known as Bridge No. 48-102-010, is a historic bridge in rural Mellette County, South Dakota, southeast of Stamford. Built in 1930, it is a three-span Bedstead Pony Truss bridge, carrying a local road over the White River, off County Road Ch 1. Each span measures 80 feet (24 m) in length, and the rest on two concrete piers and two concrete abutments with wing walls. The deck consists of steel I-beams, with wooden stringers topped by steel plates. The bridge is the longest Bedstead truss bridge in the state, and one of a modest number of surviving bridges built using this type of truss.

The bridge was replaced in 2017.

The bridge was listed on the National Register of Historic Places in 1993.

== See also ==
- List of bridges on the National Register of Historic Places in South Dakota
- National Register of Historic Places listings in Mellette County, South Dakota
