= Cameron Colony, South Dakota =

- Census-designated place
- Location within South Dakota Location within the United States
- Coordinates: 43°11′16″N 97°15′46″W
- Country: United States
- State: South Dakota
- County: Turner

Area
  - Total: 0.12 sq mi (0.32 km^{2})
  - Land: 0.12 sq mi (0.32 km^{2})
  - Water: 0 sq mi (0.00 km^{2})
- Elevation: 1,598 ft (487 m)

Population (2020)
  - Total: 79
  - Density: 647/sq mi (249.9/km^{2})
- Time zone: UTC-6 (Central (CST))
  - Summer (DST): UTC-5 (CDT)
- ZIP Code: 57070 (Viborg)
- Area code: 605
- FIPS code: 46-09204
- GNIS feature ID: 2813066

Cameron Colony is a census-designated place (CDP) and Hutterite colony in Turner County, South Dakota, United States. The population was 79 at the 2020 census. It was first listed as a CDP prior to the 2020 census.

It is in the southwest part of the county, 10 miles (16 km) west-northwest of Viborg.

== Demographics ==
Historical population
Census	Pop.	Note	%±
2020	79		—
U.S. Decennial Census

== Education ==
It is in the Viborg Hurley School District 60-6. The consolidated district started operations in 2013.
