= National Register of Historic Places listings in Mellette County, South Dakota =

Location of Mellette County in South Dakota

This is a list of the National Register of Historic Places listings in Mellette County, South Dakota.

This is intended to be a complete list of the properties on the National Register of Historic Places in Mellette County, South Dakota, United States. The locations of National Register properties for which the latitude and longitude coordinates are included below, may be seen in a map.

There are 2 properties listed on the National Register in the county.

This National Park Service list is complete through NPS recent listings posted March 21, 2025.

== Current listings ==
	Name on the Register	Image	Date listed	Location	City or town	Description
1	South Dakota Dept. of Transportation Bridge No. 48-244-204		December 9, 1993 (#93001305)	Local road over the Little White River; 43°34′29″N 100°45′39″W	White River	Closed to traffic.
2	Stamford Bridge		December 9, 1993 (#93001304)	Local road over the White River; 43°51′04″N 101°02′20″W	Cedar Butte	Replaced in 2016.

== See also ==
- List of National Historic Landmarks in South Dakota
- National Register of Historic Places listings in South Dakota
