= South Dakota Department of Transportation Bridge No. 63-052-030 =

- U.S. National Register of Historic Places
- Location within South Dakota Location within the United States
- Nearest city: Marion, South Dakota
- Coordinates: 43°27′32″N 97°17′41″W
- Area: less than one acre
- Built: 1913
- Built by: Federal Bridge Co.
- Architectural style: Warren pony truss
- MPS: Historic Bridges in South Dakota MPS
- NRHP reference No.: 99001217
- Added to NRHP: September 29, 1999

The South Dakota Department of Transportation Bridge No. 63-052-030 is a historic bridge in rural Turner County, South Dakota, carrying 271st Street across the West Fork Vermillion River northwest of Marion. Built in 1913, it is the longest surviving bridge built for the county by the Federal Bridge Company of Iowa. IIt was listed on the National Register of Historic Places in 1999.

== Description and history ==
The South Dakota Department of Transportation Bridge No. 63-052-030 is located in northwestern Turner County, about 2 miles (3.2 km) north of Marion and 1.8 miles (2.9 km) west. It is a single-span Warren pony truss structure, carrying 271st Street across the West Branch of the Vermilion River. The trusses rest on rubblestone abutments, with flared wingwalls on both sides. The trusses span 83 feet (25 m), and are assembled with rivets and bolts. Steel I-beams bolted to the truss bottom chords via gusset plates carry heavy timber stringers, over which the wooden roadway deck is laid.

The bridge was built in 1913 by the Federal Bridge Company of Des Moines, Iowa. The county had a contract with that company to provide its steel truss bridges between 1912 and 1925, apparently as part of a common but illegal practice of "pooling", in which companies divided the state into areas where they did not compete against one another. Of the ten surviving Federal Bridge Company bridges surveyed in the county in the late 1990s, this one is the longest.

== See also ==
- National Register of Historic Places listings in Turner County, South Dakota
- List of bridges on the National Register of Historic Places in South Dakota
