= Daneville Township Bridge No. E-26 =

- U.S. National Register of Historic Places
- Location within South Dakota Location within the United States
- Nearest city: Viborg, South Dakota
- Coordinates: 43°6′4″N 97°3′43″W
- Area: less than one acre
- Built: 1935
- Built by: Turner County Highway Department; Federal Emergency Relief Administration
- Architectural style: Stone arch
- MPS: Historic Bridges in South Dakota MPS
- NRHP reference No.: 99001441
- Added to NRHP: December 9, 1999

The Daneville Township Bridge No. E-26 is a historic stone arch bridge over an unnamed stream on 457th Avenue in rural Turner County, South Dakota, south of Viborg. Built in 1935, it is one of a modest number of bridges surviving in the county that was built with New Deal funding. It was listed on the National Register of Historic Places in 1999.

== Description and history ==
The Daneville Township Bridge is located in rural western Turner County, about 6 miles (9.7 km) south of Viborg. It carries 457th Avenue, a rural dirt road, across an unnamed stream between 269th Street and South Dakota Highway 16. It is a small single-arch stone structure, its arch 8 feet (2.4 m) in length and 3 feet 6 inches (1.07 m) in height. A headwall rises above the arch on each side, and extends into angled wing walls. It is built out of local quartzite fieldstone, with concrete coping topping the headwalls.

This bridge is one of 180 stone arch bridges built in Turner County as part of a New Deal-era federal jobs program. The county administration was able to build stone bridges at a lower cost than then-conventional steel beam bridges because of the availability of experienced stone workers, and the federal subsidy to the wages they were paid. The county was responsible for supervising the work crews and providing the building materials. This bridge was built in 1935 (as evidence by an incised marking on its side) by a county crew to a standardized state design.

== See also ==
- National Register of Historic Places listings in Turner County, South Dakota
- List of bridges on the National Register of Historic Places in South Dakota
