= South Dakota Department of Transportation Bridge No. 63-210-282 =

- U.S. National Register of Historic Places
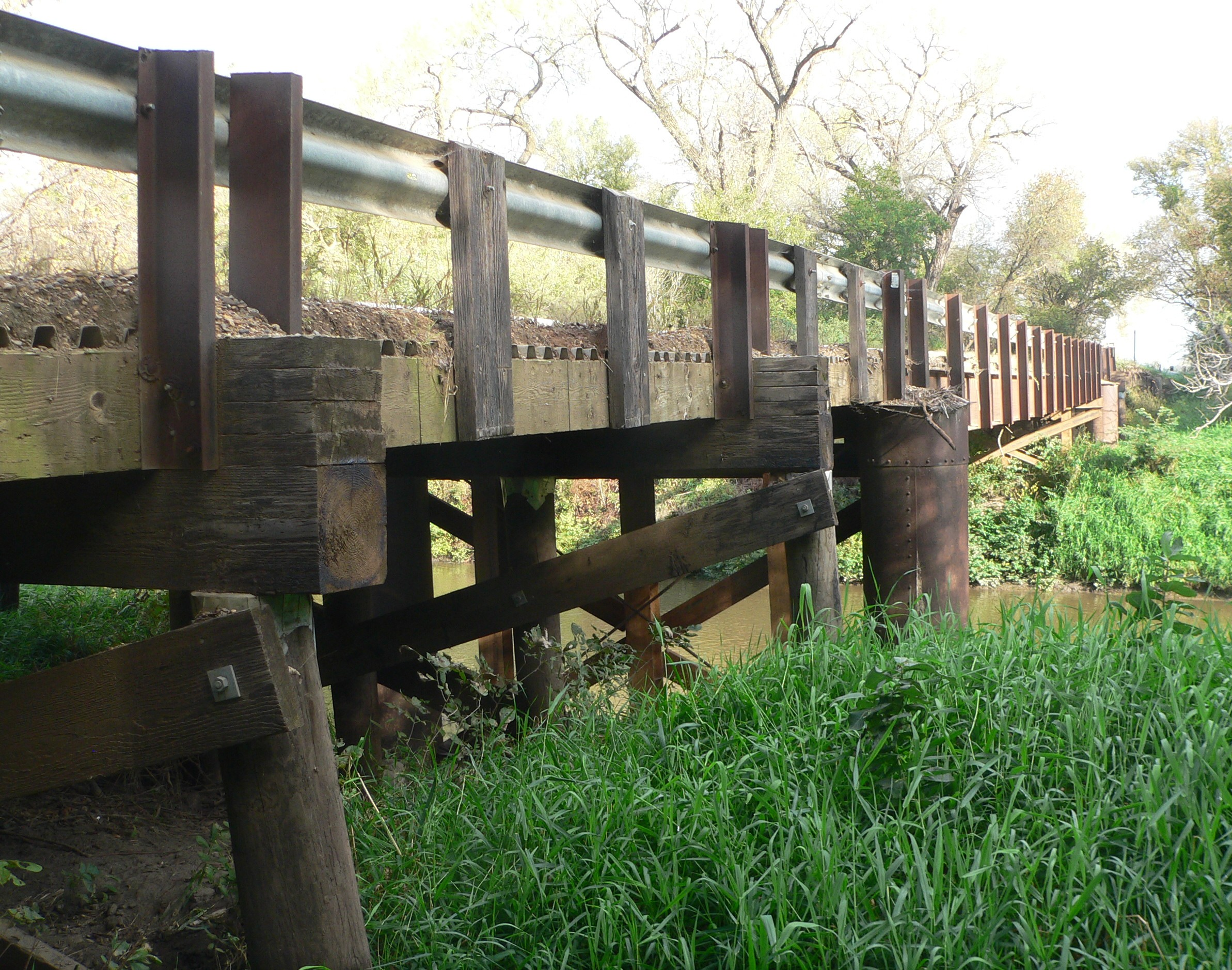

- Location within South Dakota Location within the United States
- Nearest city: Centerville, South Dakota
- Coordinates: 43°5′48″N 96°58′51″W
- Area: less than one acre
- Built: 1909
- Built by: Iowa Bridge Co.
- Architectural style: Pratt through truss
- MPS: Historic Bridges in South Dakota MPS
- NRHP reference No.: 99001216
- Added to NRHP: September 29, 1999

South Dakota Department of Transportation Bridge No. 63-210-282 was a historic bridge in rural Turner County, South Dakota, carrying 461st Avenue across the East Fork Vermillion River southwest of Centerville. Built in 1909, it was a well-preserved example of bridges built for the county by the Iowa Bridge Company. It was listed on the National Register of Historic Places in 1999. The bridge's original Pratt through main span was replaced by a steel girder span in 2009–10.

== Description and history ==
South Dakota Department of Transportation Bridge No. 63-210-282 was located about 1 mile (1.6 km) west and 1.1 miles (1.8 km) south of Centerville, carrying 461st Avenue over the East Fork Vermillion River just north of 296th Street. It was a three-span structure, with timber-framed approach spans on either side of a central Pratt through truss. The main span was 95 feet (29 m), and rested on steel tubular piers, while the outermost supports were timber crib abutments. The truss elements were riveted together, and the bridge's deck support consisted of two layers of wooden planking set on timber beams laid over steel I-beams, which were riveted to hangar plates on the trusses.

The bridge was built in 1909 by the Iowa Bridge Company of Des Moines, Iowa. The county had a contract with that company to provide its steel truss bridges between 1905 and 1911, apparently as part of a common but illegal practice of "pooling", in which companies divided the state into areas where they did not compete against one another. This bridge was a typical example of the company's work. It was replaced between 2009 and 2010.

== See also ==
- National Register of Historic Places listings in Turner County, South Dakota
- List of bridges on the National Register of Historic Places in South Dakota
