= Turner County Fair =

Annual fair in South Dakota, USA

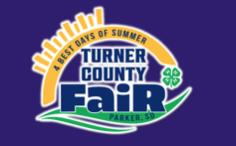
Turner County Fair Logo

The Turner County Fair is a fair held every August in Parker, South Dakota. It is South Dakota's oldest fair, started in 1880. The Fair is free gate admission, making attendance hard to count, but 60–100,000 people have been estimated to attend each year.

The fair is primarily an agricultural fair and family oriented with no alcohol on the grounds. It has been dubbed 'The Four best days of Summer'.

== History ==
The first Turner County Fair was held October 13–16, 1880, north of town near what is presently the Rosehill Cemetery. A race track and ball diamond were constructed for the fair. In 1881 the fair was held at Swan Lake, South Dakota, which was the county seat at the time.

In 1941 the fair moved to the present site, with the W.P.A helping build the new fairgrounds. A quarter mile track was also completed.

1960 was the final year of a gate fee, which was reported to be 25 cents for adults. During the late 1960s, Turner County's first school was moved to the fairground, donated by the Hurley Women's Club.

1975 saw many changes to the fair, the Turner County commission approved the purchase of more property and present day Heritage Park was constructed. This was also the first year of the Old MacDonalds farm, sponsored by several Marion area mothers wanting an attraction to entertain their young children that didn't cost any money.

On June 24, 2003, Turner County was ravaged by a tornado, which did considerable damage to Parker and the Fairgrounds. The storm that hit the fairgrounds was later classified as an EF-2, with winds up to 157 miles per hour. Nearly every building on the grounds sustained damage. The old Marion Depot, located in Heritage Park, was a total loss, as was the roof of the grandstand, the VFW bingo building, and the republican building. Many hours of labor by county employees, volunteers and 4-H members and their families got the grounds cleaned up and rebuilt in just six weeks time. Publicity from the event drove attendance to all-time records.

The Hall of Fame was created in 2017 to honor those who have given their time to ensure the fair's legacy lives on. Inductees as of 2023 include: Dorothy Schnose, Darrel (Red) Pahl, Rex Jones, Lois Duxbury, Bill Pankratz, Doris Flint, Bob and Joyce Merrill, and Marlys Davis.

In 2020 the fair was cancelled for the first time since World War II due to the COVID-19 pandemic.

2022 saw Old McDonalds Farm switch to the 'Rivers's Edge Ag Education Center'. A spring 2022 derecho tore the roof off the grandstand, which was replaced mid-summer. The Fair office also saw a fire cause significant damage.
