= Childstown Township Bridge Number S-15 =

- U.S. National Register of Historic Places
- Location within South Dakota Location within the United States
- Location: 282nd St., Childstown Township, Turner County, South Dakota
- Coordinates: 43°17′58″N 97°12′40″W
- Area: less than one acre
- Built: 1940
- Built by: Turner County Highway Department; Works Progress Administration
- Architectural style: Stone arch
- MPS: Stone Arch Culverts in Turner County, South Dakota MPS
- NRHP reference No.: 00001217
- Added to NRHP: October 30, 2000

The Childstown Township Bridge Number S-15 is a historic bridge over an unnamed stream on 282nd Street in rural Turner County, South Dakota, west of Hurley. Built in 1940, it is one of a modest number of bridges surviving in the county that was built with New Deal funding. It was listed on the National Register of Historic Places in 2000.

== Description and history ==
The Childstown Township Bridge Number S-15 is located in rural western Turner County, about 6 miles (9.7 km) west of Hurley. It carries 282nd Street, a rural dirt road, across an unnamed stream between 449th and 450th Avenues. It is a small single-span stone arch structure, with an arch 6 feet (1.8 m) in length. A headwall rises about 1 foot (0.30 m) above the arch on each side, and extends into angled wing walls. It is built out of local split fieldstone, mostly granite and gneiss. At the top of the arch on each is a metal plate is affixed with the legend "WPA 4422".

This bridge is one of 180 stone arch bridges built in Turner County as part of a New Deal-era federal jobs program. The county administration was able to build stone bridges at a lower cost than then-conventional steel beam bridges because of the availability of experienced stone workers, and the federal subsidy to the wages they were paid. The county was responsible for supervising the work crews and providing the building materials. This bridge was built in 1940 by a county crew to a standardized state design.

== See also ==
- National Register of Historic Places listings in Turner County, South Dakota
- List of bridges on the National Register of Historic Places in South Dakota
