= Ivan Dmitri =

American photographer (1900–1968)

- Born: Levon Fairchild West; February 3, 1900; Centerville, South Dakota, U.S.
- Died: April 25, 1968 (aged 68); New York City, U.S.
- Education: University of Minnesota; Art Students League of New York
- Occupations: Etcher, photographic artist
- Style: Etching
- Spouse: Louise Remington (m. 1943)
- Awards: Rough Rider Award (1962)

Ivan Dmitri (or Dmitre; February 3, 1900 – April 25, 1968), born Levon Fairchild West (Assadoorian), was an American etcher and photographic artist. His work was part of the painting event in the art competition at the 1932 Summer Olympics.

== Early years ==
West was born in Centerville, South Dakota, to Avedis Madros West and Henrietta West. His father was a Congregational minister, who immigrated from Armenia. The family changed its name to "West" when Levon and his brothers did not want to enlist in the service during World War I under their Armenian last name, Assadoorian. The name West was chosen as it was the maiden name of Levon's mother. Levon West adopted the pen name of "Ivan Dmitri" to use for his color photography work. His etchings and watercolors were always done under his original name, Levon West.

Levon West moved often as a boy, as his father preached in a series of North Dakota towns. His father was pastor at the Congregational Church in Glen Ullin, from 1914 to 1918, when the family moved to Harvey. West graduated from Harvey High School as valedictorian. He served in the Navy in WWI. When the war ended, West taught school in Wells County, North Dakota. After that, he attended the University of Minnesota, graduating in 1924. He wanted to take almost entirely art courses in college, but his father insisted that he major in business administration.

== Professional career ==
While studying at the Art Students League of New York, West formed an aviation corporation with friends. They serviced planes at Roosevelt Field on Long Island. One day he noticed a different type of plane and did sketches of it. This plane belonged to Charles Lindbergh. When West heard Lindbergh had flown the Spirit of St. Louis on a record breaking trans-Atlantic flight, he hurriedly did an etching from his sketches and took it to the New York Times. The paper asked how much he wanted for it and he said, "I don’t care how much I get for it, but put my name on it good and big at the bottom." When the newspaper came out the next day with his etching on the front page, demand for his work followed. He was contacted by the Kennedy Galleries in New York the following day. This led to a series of successful etchings and national prominence. West was also a skilled watercolorist.

When he began working with color photography, Levon West adopted the pen name "Ivan Dmitri," though he continued to use the name "Levon West" for his non-photographic work. Ivan Dmitri was a pioneer in color photography and wrote several books on the subject, his first being Color in Photography, in 1939.

The first color photographic cover on The Saturday Evening Post magazine (May 29, 1937) was by Dmitri, a photo of an automobile racing driver seated in his race car. Another SEP cover (May 16, 1944) was a photo of General 'Hap' Arnold, with B-17's flying overhead, with a B-17 crew planning a flight. This cover was so popular that the United States government used the photo image to print a very rare World War II war effort poster.

As Ivan Dmitri, he helped to gain acceptance of photography as an art medium, and established one of the first photography exhibits at New York's Metropolitan Museum of Art. Dmitri believed that such a move was necessary in order for the public to treat photography as art, rather than just something reserved for smaller mediums like books, magazines and newspapers. Beginning in 1959, Dimitri organized a series of exhibitions titled "Photography in the Fine Arts."

West was a recipient of the North Dakota Theodore Roosevelt Rough Rider Award in April 1962, the third person so inducted.

== Personal life ==
In 1943, West married Louise Remington.

West died on April 25, 1968, age 68, at New York Hospital in New York City.
