= Salem Township Bridge Number E-1 =

- U.S. National Register of Historic Places
- Location within South Dakota Location within the United States
- Nearest city: Salem, South Dakota
- Coordinates: 43°14′52″N 97°16′45″W
- Area: less than one acre
- Built: 1940
- Built by: Turner County Highway Superintendent; WPA
- Architectural style: Stone arch
- MPS: Stone Arch Culverts in Turner County, South Dakota MPS
- NRHP reference No.: 00001218
- Added to NRHP: October 30, 2000

The Salem Township Bridge E-1 is a historic stone arch bridge over an unnamed stream on 446th Street in rural Turner County, South Dakota, west of Hurley. Built in 1940, it is one of a modest number of bridges surviving in the county that was built with New Deal funding. It was listed on the National Register of Historic Places in 2000.

== Description and history ==
The Salem Township Bridge is located in rural southwestern Turner County, about 10 miles (16 km) west of Hurley. It carries 446th Street, a rural gravel road, across an unnamed stream between United States Route 18 and 285th Avenues. It is a single-arch stone structure, its arches 6 feet (1.8 m) in length. A headwall rises above the arches on each side, about 1 foot (30 cm) above road grade, and extends into angled wing walls. A stone retaining wall extends south on one side of the structure, giving it a total length of about 50 feet (15 m). It is built out of heavily mortared local quartzite and granite fieldstone.

This bridge is one of 180 stone arch bridges built in Turner County as part of a New Deal-era federal jobs program. The county administration was able to build stone bridges at a lower cost than then-conventional steel beam bridges because of the availability of experienced stone workers, and the federal subsidy to the wages they were paid. The county was responsible for supervising the work crews and providing the building materials. This bridge was built in 1940 by a county crew to a standardized state design.

== See also ==
- National Register of Historic Places listings in Turner County, South Dakota
- List of bridges on the National Register of Historic Places in South Dakota
