= Swan Lake (South Dakota) =

Lake in the state of South Dakota, United States

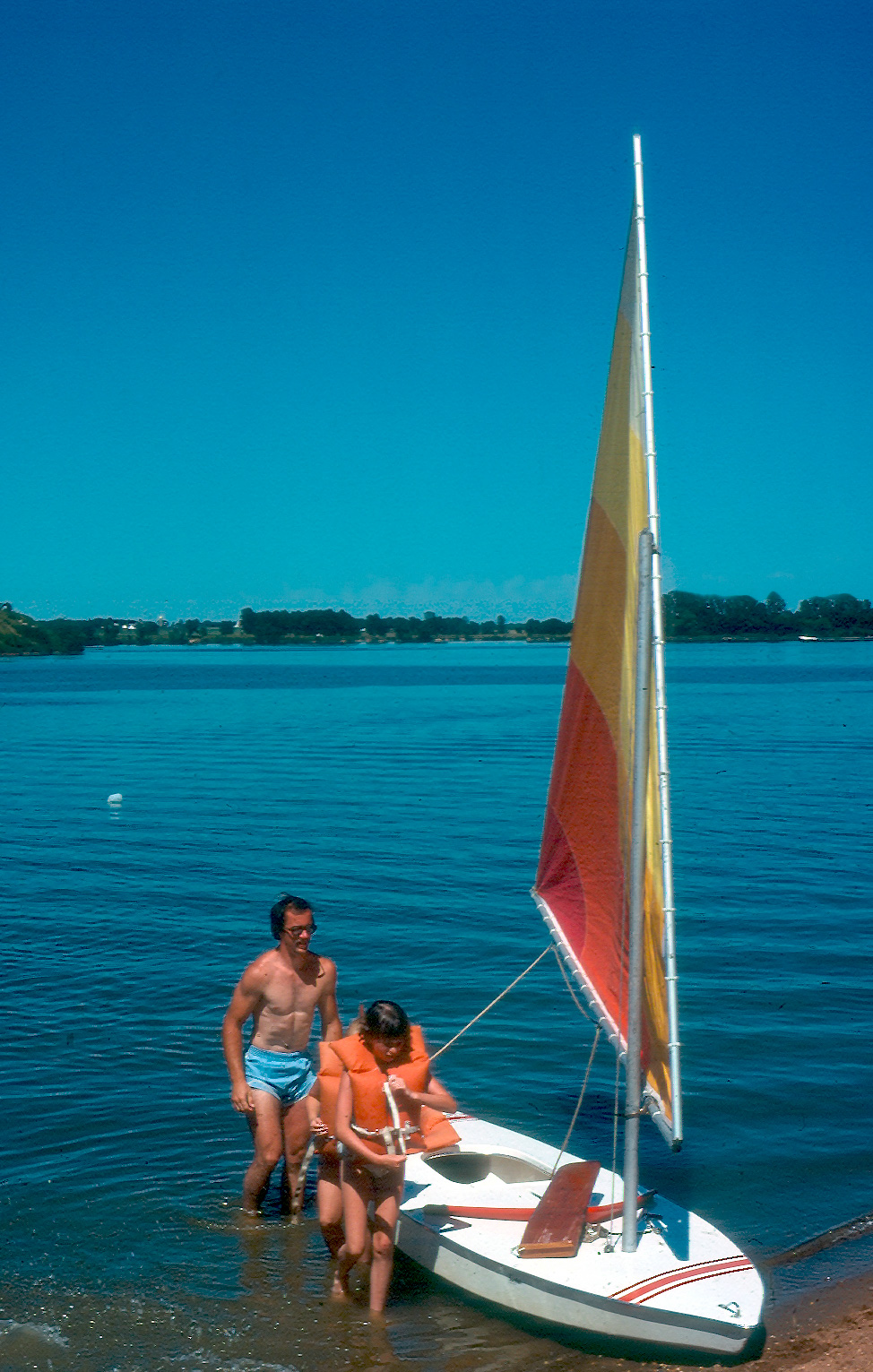

- Location within South Dakota Location within the United States
- Location: Near Viborg, South Dakota
- Coordinates: 43°13′15″N 97°6′9″W
- Basin countries: United States
- Surface elevation: 1,250 ft (381 m)

Swan Lake, South Dakota is a small natural lake located north-northwest of the city of Viborg, South Dakota. The lake is surrounded by cabins and is used for recreational purposes.

== History ==
It is called Swan Lake because it is shaped like a swan. From the 1920s until the late 1970s there was a resort at Swan Lake on the south side of the lake. It included a pavilion that sold food and it had a band stand, dance floor and roller skating rink on the same floor. Cabins were rented out and bands performed at the pavilion. There was a bath house to rent swim suits, several boats for rent and bait could also be bought. The pavilion was built after World War I and owned by the Ebersen family. On 2/1/1921 the pavilion was purchased by Peter N. Hansen and his wife Claudine whose children Erna, Art, Lorna, and Earl grew up on the resort. They owned it until about 1946. Some other owners of the Swan Lake Resort over the years were a Bill and Mary Myreholt and Waldo and Marilyn Jorgensen. The cabins were sold to individuals during the 60's and 70's. The pavilion burned down around 1979. Today there is a place called the Shore Store on the east side of the lake. The shore store is still open, at 3 daily.

On June 7, 1965, an F4 tornado hit the north side, causing one fatality, with damage estimated between 500,000 and 5 million dollars.

== See also ==
- List of South Dakota lakes
- http://www.tornadohistoryproject.com/tornado/19650607.46.46
