= Germantown Township Bridge S-29 =

- U.S. National Register of Historic Places
- Location within South Dakota Location within the United States
- Nearest city: Chancellor, South Dakota
- Coordinates: 43°21′32″N 97°0′29″W
- Area: less than one acre
- Built: 1942
- Built by: Turner County Highway Department; Works Progress Administration
- Architectural style: Stone arch
- MPS: Stone Arch Culverts in Turner County, South Dakota MPS
- NRHP reference No.: 00001219
- Added to NRHP: October 30, 2000

The Germantown Township Bridge S-29 is a historic stone arch bridge over an unnamed stream on 278th Street in rural Turner County, South Dakota, southwest of Chancellor. Built in 1942, it is one of a modest number of bridges surviving in the county that was built with New Deal funding. It was listed on the National Register of Historic Places in 2000.

== Description and history ==
The Germantown Township Bridge is located in rural southeastern Turner County, about 1.5 miles (2.4 km) southwest of Chancellor. It carries 278th Street, a rural paved road, across an unnamed stream between 459th and 460th Avenues. It is a two-arch stone structure, its arches 7 feet (2.1 m) in length and 3 feet 6 inches (1.07 m) in height. A headwall rises above the arches on each side, about 10 inches (25 cm) above road grade, and extends into angled wing walls. A stone nose projects away from the arches on one side of the structure. It is built out of heavily mortared local quartzite and granite fieldstone.

This bridge is one of 180 stone arch bridges built in Turner County as part of a New Deal-era federal jobs program. The county administration was able to build stone bridges at a lower cost than then-conventional steel beam bridges because of the availability of experienced stone workers, and the federal subsidy to the wages they were paid. The county was responsible for supervising the work crews and providing the building materials. This bridge was built in 1942 by a county crew to a standardized state design.

== See also ==
- National Register of Historic Places listings in Turner County, South Dakota
- List of bridges on the National Register of Historic Places in South Dakota
