= South Dakota Department of Transportation Bridge No. 63-132-040 =

- U.S. National Register of Historic Places
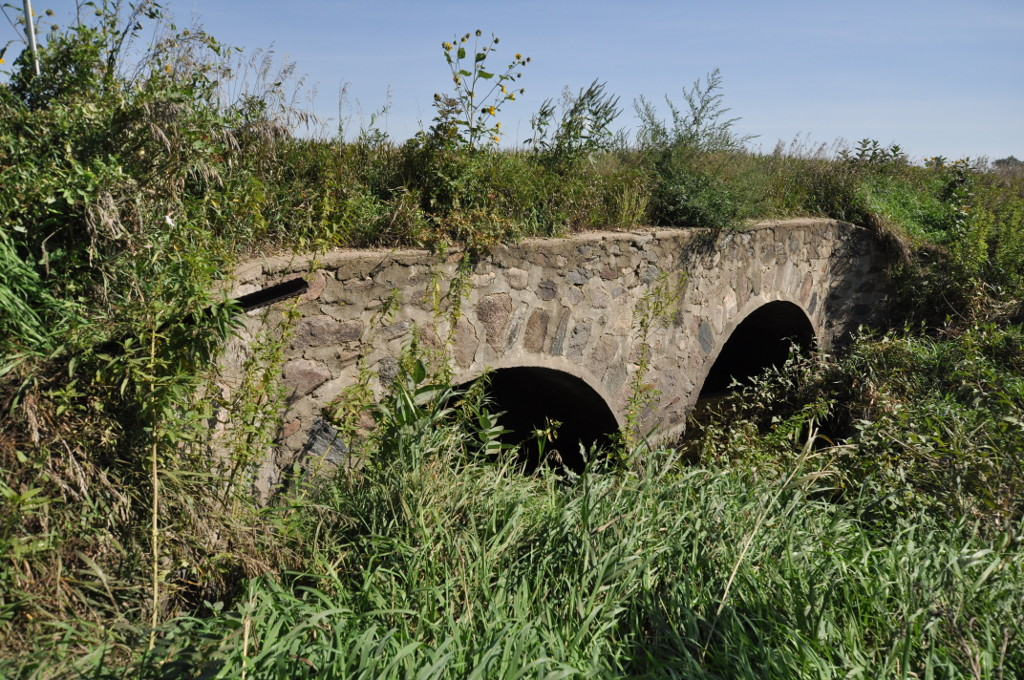

- Location within South Dakota Location within the United States
- Nearest city: Parker, South Dakota
- Coordinates: 43°26′42″N 97°8′9″W
- Area: less than one acre
- Built: 1939
- Built by: Turner County Highway Dept.; Work Progress Administration
- Architectural style: Stone arch
- MPS: Historic Bridges in South Dakota MPS
- NRHP reference No.: 99001215
- Added to NRHP: September 29, 1999

South Dakota Department of Transportation Bridge No. 63-132-040 is a historic bridge in rural Turner County, South Dakota. Built in 1939, it is a well-preserved period stone-arch bridge, built with funding from a New Deal jobs program. It was listed on the National Register of Historic Places in 1999.

== Description and history ==
Bridge No. 63-016-150 is located in rural northern Turner County, carrying 272nd Street over an unnamed stream, between 453rd Avenue and South Dakota Highway 19. It is a two-arch stone structure, with a total length of about 24 feet (7.3 m). Its two arches are segmental, with a span of 10 feet (3.0 m), and rise about 12 inches (0.30 m) above the grade. The bridge has stone wing walls, which rise to low parapets that serve as curbing for the roadway. The bridge is fashioned out of locally quarried fieldstone, most of which is roughly cut and randomly laid. The finished surfaces have been trimmed and squared.

This bridge is one of 180 stone arch bridges built in Turner County as part of a New Deal-era federal jobs program, the Federal Emergency Relief Administration (FERA). The county administration was able to build stone bridges at a lower cost than then-conventional steel beam bridges because of the availability of experienced stone workers, and the federal subsidy to the wages they were paid. The county was responsible for supervising the work crews and providing the building materials. This bridge was built in 1935 by a county crew to a standardized state design. It is one of only two bridges in the county built with FERA funding; others were built with later Works Progress Administration funds.

== See also ==
- National Register of Historic Places listings in Turner County, South Dakota
- List of bridges on the National Register of Historic Places in South Dakota
