= Parker Masonic Hall =

- U.S. National Register of Historic Places
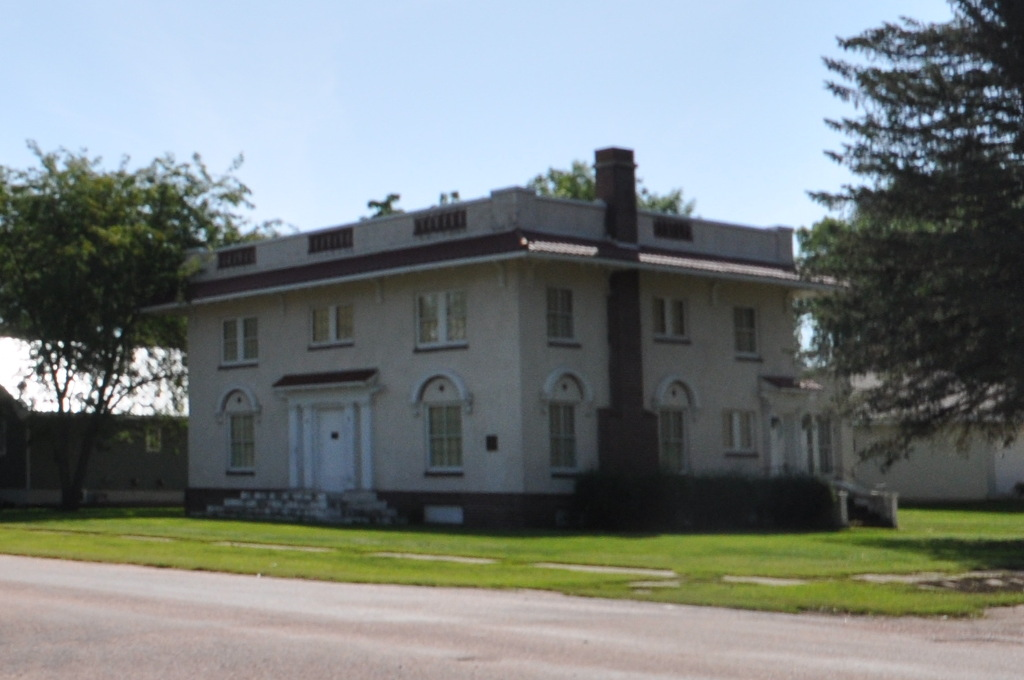

- Location within South Dakota Location within the United States
- Location: 130 S. Cherry Ave., Parker, South Dakota
- Coordinates: 43°23′55″N 97°8′3″W
- Area: less than one acre
- Built: 1925
- Architectural style: Renaissance
- NRHP reference No.: 04000761
- Added to NRHP: July 28, 2004

The Masonic Hall in Parker, South Dakota is a historic building dating from 1925. It was originally constructed as a residence by one of a local banker. After a fire in 1931, the building was purchased by the Parker Masonic lodge and converted into a lodge meeting hall. It was listed on the National Register of Historic Places in 2004.
