= Spring Valley Township Bridge No. E-31 =

- U.S. National Register of Historic Places
- Nearest city: Viborg, South Dakota
- Coordinates: 43°10′27″N 97°15′33″W
- Area: less than one acre
- Built: 1938
- Built by: Turner County Highway Dept.; Works Progress Administration
- Architectural style: Stone arch
- MPS: Historic Bridges in South Dakota MPS
- NRHP reference No.: 99001440
- Added to NRHP: December 9, 1999

Spring Valley Township Bridge No. E-31 is a historic bridge in rural Turner County, South Dakota, carrying 447th Avenue across unnamed stream west of Viborg. Built in 1938, it was a well-preserved example of a stone bridge built for the county with funding from the Works Progress Administration. It was listed on the National Register of Historic Places in 1999.

== Description and history ==
Spring Valley Township Bridge No. E-31 is located in a rural setting of southwestern Turner County, on 447th Avenue between 290th and 291st Streets, about 9 miles (14 km) west of Viborg. It is a three-arch stone structure, built out of native granite and quartzite, mostly of rubblestone with shaped voussoirs. Each arch spans about 10 feet (3.0 m) and rises about 4 feet (1.2 m). The spandrel walls rise to form low parapets on the sides, topped with concrete coping and extended to flared wing walls. One of the central piers has had its base reinforced by concrete blocks.

This bridge is one of 180 stone arch bridges built in Turner County as part of New Deal-era federal jobs programs. The county administration was able to build stone bridges at a lower cost than then-conventional steel beam bridges because of the availability of experienced stone workers, and the federal subsidy to the wages they were paid. The county was responsible for supervising the work crews and providing the building materials. This bridge was built in 1938 by a county crew to a standardized state design.

== See also ==
- National Register of Historic Places listings in Turner County, South Dakota
- List of bridges on the National Register of Historic Places in South Dakota
