= Max Gors =

American judge

Max Gors (January 21, 1945 – February 27, 2014) was an American jurist.

== Early life ==
Gors was born in Viborg, South Dakota. He was the son of Max John Gors (1922–1999) and Muriel Genevieve (Flyger) Gors (1921–2014). He received his bachelor's degree from Augustana College and his law degree from Drake University Law School.

== Career ==
Gors was the assistant attorney general in Iowa. In 1971, he returned to South Dakota and worked in government as assistant attorney general, secretary of commerce, and chairman of the South Dakota Board of Pardons. In 1990, he was elected South Dakota Circuit Judge. He later served as acting associate justice of the South Dakota Supreme Court. He died in Sioux Falls, South Dakota.

== Personal life ==
He served on Augustana College's alumni council and was a member of Lutheran Memorial Church where he served as church president. He died on February 2, 2014.
