= Realf Ottesen Brandt =

Realf Ottesen Brandt (September 12, 1859 – March 23, 1927) was an American Lutheran minister.

== Background ==
Realf Brandt was born near the Jefferson Prairie Settlement in Rock County, Wisconsin. His father, Nils Olsen Brandt (1824–1921), who had been born in Slidre, Valdres, Norway, served as President of Luther College. His mother, Diderikke Ottesen Brandt (1827–1885), was born in Sande parish on the Oslofjord in Norway. In appreciation of her many contributions to Luther College, the alumni association in 1883 had her portrait painted by Herbjørn Gausta. Realf Brandt was a graduate of Luther College in 1877 and of Luther Seminary in Madison, Wisconsin in 1883.

== Ministry ==
He was ordained a Lutheran minister on September 2, 1883, by the Reverend U. V. Koren. He served in the Lutheran ministry for 44 years. He served for 17 years in Deuel County, South Dakota and 27 years at McFarland, Wisconsin. Both Brandt Township in Deuel County and the village of Brandt, South Dakota were named for him.

Starting in 1906 and working with Halvor Hustvedt, Brandt was one of the first editors of the Lutheran Herald. This was the first general church organ published in English by a Norwegian-American synodical body. Brandt was a member of the South Dakota Board of Regents from 1890 until 1892. He also proved himself a leader of the movement to outlaw liquor in the state of South Dakota.

Realf Brandt married Thalette "Lettie" Mathilde Galby (1859–1939) in 1880. The daughter of John T. Galby and Margaret Aaker of Ridgeway, Iowa, Lettie was educated at the Breckenridge Institute in Decorah. She served as an officer in several Lutheran church organizations, including two terms as secretary of the Eastern District Women's Missionary Federation.

== Other sources ==
- Lomen, G. J. Genealogies of the Lomen (Ringstad), Brandt and Joy's Families (Northfield, Minnesota: Mohn Printing Company, 1929)
