= Hay Creek Bridge =

- U.S. National Register of Historic Places
- Location: Eighth Ave. over Hay Cr., Belle Fourche, South Dakota
- Coordinates: 44°39′54″N 103°51′05″W
- Area: less than one acre
- Built: 1941
- Built by: WPA
- Architectural style: Multi-plate arch
- MPS: Historic Bridges in South Dakota MPS
- NRHP reference No.: 93001274
- Added to NRHP: December 9, 1993

The Hay Creek Bridge in Belle Fourche, South Dakota was built in 1941. It was listed on the National Register of Historic Places in 1993.

It is a two-span multi-plate arch bridge, with two semi-circular barrel arches with filled spandrels. It was built by the City of Belle Fourche and the Works Progress Administration. It brings 8th Ave. over Hay Creek, within Belle Fourche. It is also known as Eighth Ave. Bridge and as South Dakota Dept. of Transportation Bridge No. 10-100-378.
