= Viborg Hurley School District 60-6 =

School district in South Dakota, United States

Viborg Hurley School District 60-6 is a school district headquartered in Viborg, South Dakota.

The majority of the district is in Turner County, where it includes Viborg, Hurley, Davis, and Cameron Colony. Portions extend into Yankton County.

== History ==
The Viborg and Hurley school districts consolidated in 2013.

In August 2009 the Hurley and Viborg districts, then separate, had 117 and 249 students, respectively. At that time they had the same man as superintendent, Pat Kraning. He stated: "We need to figure a way to grow together, or (we) die separately." The two districts had combined athletic programs, and several employees of each worked for the other district.

By 2011 the two districts voted to merge. 92% of the voters in the Hurley district and 64% of the voters in the Viborg district approved the referendum to merge. July 1, 2012 was the scheduled date of the schools consolidating.

Kraning resigned from his two superintendent positions in 2011. The Hurley and Viborg high schools consolidated in 2012 with a common location in Viborg. The combined middle school started in Hurley and the combined elementary school started in Viborg.
