= South Dakota Department of Transportation Bridge No. 02-007-220 =

- Formerly listed on the U.S. National Register of Historic Places
- Location within South Dakota Location within the United States
- Nearest city: White Lake, South Dakota
- Coordinates: 43.61433°N 98.78031°W
- Area: less than one acre
- Built: 1908
- Built by: Canton Bridge Company
- Architectural style: Warren Pony Truss
- Demolished: 2004
- MPS: Historic Bridges in South Dakota MPS
- NRHP reference No.: 99001338

Significant dates
- Added to NRHP: November 19, 1999
- Removed from NRHP: March 26, 2008

South Dakota Department of Transportation Bridge No. 02-007-220, or Platte Creek Bridge, is a former historic place near White Lake, South Dakota. Replaced in 2004, a local road followed the bridge over Platte Creek. Designed in the Warren Pony Truss style by the Canton Bridge Company, the structure was maintained by the South Dakota Department of Transportation.

The bridge was constructed in 1908 and added to the National Register in 1999. It was removed from the register in 2008.
