= Germantown Township, Turner County, South Dakota =

Township in Turner County, South Dakota

Coordinates: 43°22′53″N 96°58′28″W

Germantown Township is a township in Turner County, South Dakota, United States. As of the 2010 census, its population was 358.

It is the location of Germantown Township Bridge S-29, 278th Street, Germantown, South Dakota (Turner County Highway Superintendent), which is listed on the National Register of Historic Places.
