= Chancellor, South Dakota =

- Town
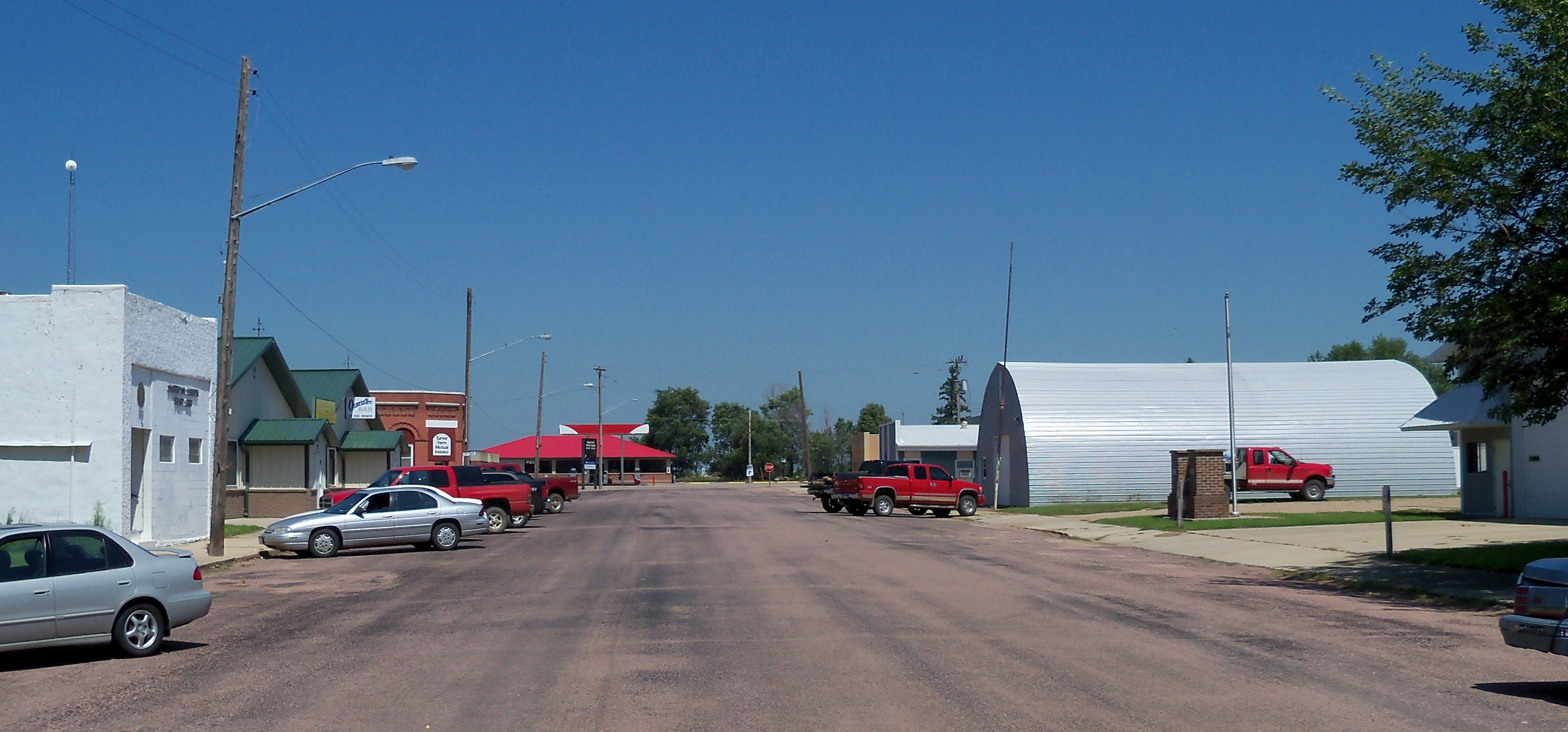
- Downtown Chancellor, South Dakota

- Location in Turner County and the state of South Dakota
- Coordinates: 43°22′24″N 96°59′06″W
- Country: United States
- State: South Dakota
- County: Turner
- Founded: 1895

Area
  - Total: 0.22 sq mi (0.57 km^{2})
  - Land: 0.22 sq mi (0.57 km^{2})
  - Water: 0 sq mi (0.00 km^{2})
- Elevation: 1,362 ft (415 m)

Population (2020)
  - Total: 300
  - Density: 1,366.4/sq mi (527.57/km^{2})
- Time zone: UTC-6 (Central (CST))
  - Summer (DST): UTC-5 (CDT)
- ZIP code: 57015
- Area code: 605
- FIPS code: 46-11380
- GNIS feature ID: 1267326
- Website: www.townofchancellor.com

Chancellor is a town in northeastern Turner County, South Dakota, United States. The population was 300 at the 2020 census.

The community was named for Otto von Bismarck, Chancellor of the German Empire.

== Geography ==
According to the United States Census Bureau, the town has a total area of 0.22 square miles (0.57 km^{2}), all land.

== Demographics ==
Historical population
Census	Pop.	Note	%±
1910	160		—
1920	280		75.0%
1930	207		−26.1%
1940	232		12.1%
1950	193		−16.8%
1960	214		10.9%
1970	220		2.8%
1980	257		16.8%
1990	276		7.4%
2000	328		18.8%
2010	264		−19.5%
2020	300		13.6%
U.S. Decennial Census

=== 2010 census ===
As of the census of 2010, there were 264 people, 118 households, and 75 families residing in the town. The population density was 1,200.0 inhabitants per square mile (463.3/km^{2}). There were 131 housing units at an average density of 595.5 units per square mile (229.9 units/km^{2}). The racial makeup of the town was 97.3% White, 0.4% African American, 0.4% Native American, 0.4% Asian, and 1.5% from two or more races. Hispanic or Latino of any race were 0.8% of the population.

There were 118 households, of which 28.8% had children under the age of 18 living with them, 53.4% were married couples living together, 7.6% had a female householder with no husband present, 2.5% had a male householder with no wife present, and 36.4% were non-families. 33.9% of all households were made up of individuals, and 11.9% had someone living alone who was 65 years of age or older. The average household size was 2.24 and the average family size was 2.80.

The median age in the town was 39.9 years. 22.3% of residents were under the age of 18; 9.9% were between the ages of 18 and 24; 24.3% were from 25 to 44; 25% were from 45 to 64; and 18.6% were 65 years of age or older. The gender makeup of the town was 49.6% male and 50.4% female.

=== 2000 census ===
As of the census of 2000, there were 328 people, 134 households, and 88 families residing in the town. The population density was 1,328.8 inhabitants per square mile (513.1/km^{2}). There were 142 housing units at an average density of 575.3 units per square mile (222.1 units/km^{2}). The racial makeup of the town was 97.87% White, 0.91% Native American, and 1.22% from two or more races. Hispanic or Latino of any race were 0.30% of the population.

There were 134 households, out of which 35.1% had children under the age of 18 living with them, 56.0% were married couples living together, 8.2% had a female householder with no husband present, and 33.6% were non-families. 32.1% of all households were made up of individuals, and 15.7% had someone living alone who was 65 years of age or older. The average household size was 2.45 and the average family size was 3.07.

In the town, the population was spread out, with 26.8% under the age of 18, 9.1% from 18 to 24, 28.7% from 25 to 44, 18.0% from 45 to 64, and 17.4% who were 65 years of age or older. The median age was 32 years. For every 100 females, there were 90.7 males. For every 100 females age 18 and over, there were 92.0 males.

The median income for a household in the town was $30,500, and the median income for a family was $42,250. Males had a median income of $22,750 versus $19,167 for females. The per capita income for the town was $18,156. None of the families and 4.2% of the population were living below the poverty line, including no under eighteens and 11.8% of those over 64.

== Education ==
Chancellor is a part of the Lennox School District 41-4, which operates LWC Junior High School/Lennox High School in Lennox.
