= Brandt, South Dakota =

Brandt, South Dakota Brandt
- Town
- Location in Deuel County and the state of South Dakota
- Coordinates: 44°40′01″N 96°37′31″W
- Country: United States
- State: South Dakota
- County: Deuel
- Incorporated: 1880

Area
  - Total: 1.26 sq mi (3.27 km^{2})
  - Land: 1.26 sq mi (3.27 km^{2})
  - Water: 0 sq mi (0.00 km^{2})
- Elevation: 1,844 ft (562 m)

Population (2020)
  - Total: 114
  - Density: 90.3/sq mi (34.85/km^{2})
- Time zone: UTC-6 (Central (CST))
  - Summer (DST): UTC-5 (CDT)
- ZIP code: 57218
- Area code: 605
- FIPS code: 46-06940
- GNIS feature ID: 1267293

Brandt is a town in Deuel County, South Dakota, United States. The population was 114 at the 2020 census.

== History ==
Brandt was laid out in 1884. The town was named for the Rev. P.O. Brandt.

== Geography ==
According to the United States Census Bureau, the town has a total area of 1.26 square miles (3.26 km^{2}), all land.

Brandt sits in the middle east of the county, and is located nine miles from I-29, which passes through the eastern side of South Dakota. Brandt is 76 miles north of Sioux Falls.

== Demographics ==
Historical population
| Census | Pop. | Note | %± |
|---|---|---|---|
| 1910 | 158 | | — |
| 1920 | 299 | | 89.2% |
| 1930 | 265 | | −11.4% |
| 1940 | 271 | | 2.3% |
| 1950 | 211 | | −22.1% |
| 1960 | 148 | | −29.9% |
| 1970 | 132 | | −10.8% |
| 1980 | 129 | | −2.3% |
| 1990 | 123 | | −4.7% |
| 2000 | 113 | | −8.1% |
| 2010 | 107 | | −5.3% |
| 2020 | 114 | | 6.5% |
U.S. Decennial Census

=== 2010 census ===
As of the census of 2010, there were 107 people, 43 households, and 24 families residing in the town. The population density was 84.9 inhabitants per square mile (32.8/km^{2}). There were 50 housing units at an average density of 39.7 per square mile (15.3/km^{2}). The racial makeup of the town was 96.3% White, 0.9% from other races, and 2.8% from two or more races. Hispanic or Latino of any race were 3.7% of the population.

There were 43 households, of which 20.9% had children under the age of 18 living with them, 48.8% were married couples living together, 4.7% had a female householder with no husband present, 2.3% had a male householder with no wife present, and 44.2% were non-families. 37.2% of all households were made up of individuals, and 11.6% had someone living alone who was 65 years of age or older. The average household size was 2.49 and the average family size was 3.46.

The median age in the town was 35.8 years. 25.2% of residents were under the age of 18; 10.2% were between the ages of 18 and 24; 24.3% were from 25 to 44; 29% were from 45 to 64; and 11.2% were 65 years of age or older. The gender makeup of the town was 51.4% male and 48.6% female.

=== 2000 census ===
As of the census of 2000, there were 113 people, 51 households, and 29 families residing in the town. The population density was 90.1 inhabitants per square mile (34.8/km^{2}). There were 61 housing units at an average density of 48.6 per square mile (18.8/km^{2}). The racial makeup of the town was 98.23% White, 0.88% African American, and 0.88% from two or more races.

There were 51 households, out of which 33.3% had children under the age of 18 living with them, 47.1% were married couples living together, 3.9% had a female householder with no husband present, and 43.1% were non-families. 39.2% of all households were made up of individuals, and 23.5% had someone living alone who was 65 years of age or older. The average household size was 2.22 and the average family size was 3.00.

In the town, the population was spread out, with 27.4% under the age of 18, 7.1% from 18 to 24, 38.1% from 25 to 44, 13.3% from 45 to 64, and 14.2% who were 65 years of age or older. The median age was 36 years. For every 100 females, there were 98.2 males. For every 100 females age 18 and over, there were 95.2 males.

The median income for a household in the town was $30,417, and the median income for a family was $31,250. Males had a median income of $23,750 versus $13,750 for females. The per capita income for the town was $15,358. There were 21.1% of families and 21.2% of the population living below the poverty line, including 47.4% of under eighteens and 13.6% of those over 64.

== Notable person ==
- Realf Ottesen Brandt, Lutheran minister
