= Childstown Township, Turner County, South Dakota =

Township in South Dakota, United States

Coordinates: 43°17′33″N 97°19′45″W

Childstown Township is a township in Turner County, South Dakota, United States. As of the 2010 census, its population was 237.

It is the location of the Childstown Township Bridge Number S-15, 282nd St., Childstown, SD (Turner County Highway Superintendent), which is listed on the National Register of Historic Places.
