= Hurley, South Dakota =

- City
- Location in Turner County and the state of South Dakota
- Coordinates: 43°16′46″N 97°05′22″W
- Country: United States
- State: South Dakota
- County: Turner
- Incorporated: 1883

Area
  - Total: 0.61 sq mi (1.59 km^{2})
  - Land: 0.61 sq mi (1.59 km^{2})
  - Water: 0 sq mi (0.00 km^{2})
- Elevation: 1,283 ft (391 m)

Population (2020)
  - Total: 379
  - Density: 616/sq mi (237.7/km^{2})
- Time zone: UTC-6 (Central (CST))
  - Summer (DST): UTC-5 (CDT)
- ZIP code: 57036
- Area code: 605
- FIPS code: 46-30980
- GNIS feature ID: 1267432

Hurley is a city in Turner County, South Dakota, United States. The population was 379 at the 2020 census.

== History ==
Hurley was platted in 1883. It was named for R. E. Hurley, a railroad engineer. A post office has been in operation in Hurley since 1883.

== Geography ==
According to the United States Census Bureau, the city has a total area of 0.62 square miles (1.61 km^{2}), all land.

== Demographics ==
Historical population
Census	Pop.	Note	%±
1890	344		—
1900	444		29.1%
1910	506		14.0%
1920	586		15.8%
1930	586		0.0%
1940	586		0.0%
1950	474		−19.1%
1960	450		−5.1%
1970	399		−11.3%
1980	419		5.0%
1990	372		−11.2%
2000	426		14.5%
2010	415		−2.6%
2020	379		−8.7%
U.S. Decennial Census

=== 2020 census ===
As of the 2020 census, Hurley had a population of 379. The median age was 42.6 years. 23.5% of residents were under the age of 18 and 19.3% of residents were 65 years of age or older. For every 100 females there were 106.0 males, and for every 100 females age 18 and over there were 105.7 males age 18 and over.

0.0% of residents lived in urban areas, while 100.0% lived in rural areas.

There were 164 households in Hurley, of which 26.2% had children under the age of 18 living in them. Of all households, 53.0% were married-couple households, 18.9% were households with a male householder and no spouse or partner present, and 21.3% were households with a female householder and no spouse or partner present. About 28.1% of all households were made up of individuals and 15.2% had someone living alone who was 65 years of age or older.

There were 189 housing units, of which 13.2% were vacant. The homeowner vacancy rate was 2.7% and the rental vacancy rate was 21.4%.

Racial composition as of the 2020 census
Race	Number	Percent
White	345	91.0%
Black or African American	4	1.1%
American Indian and Alaska Native	1	0.3%
Asian	0	0.0%
Native Hawaiian and Other Pacific Islander	0	0.0%
Some other race	10	2.6%
Two or more races	19	5.0%
Hispanic or Latino (of any race)	26	6.9%

=== 2010 census ===
At the 2010 census there were 415 people in 179 households, including 120 families, in the city. The population density was 669.4 inhabitants per square mile (258.5/km^{2}). There were 204 housing units at an average density of 329.0 per square mile (127.0/km^{2}). The racial makup of the city was 97.1% White, 0.2% African American, 1.0% Native American, and 1.7% from two or more races. Hispanic or Latino of any race were 2.4%.

Of the 179 households 30.7% had children under the age of 18 living with them, 52.5% were married couples living together, 10.6% had a female householder with no husband present, 3.9% had a male householder with no wife present, and 33.0% were non-families. 30.2% of households were one person and 12.8% were one person aged 65 or older. The average household size was 2.32 and the average family size was 2.82.

The median age was 35.9 years. 27% of residents were under the age of 18; 6.6% were between the ages of 18 and 24; 26.7% were from 25 to 44; 23.9% were from 45 to 64; and 15.9% were 65 or older. The gender makeup of the city was 49.4% male and 50.6% female.

=== 2000 census ===
At the 2000 census there were 426 people in 187 households, including 123 families, in the city. The population density was 690.4 inhabitants per square mile (266.6/km^{2}). There were 206 housing units at an average density of 333.8 per square mile (128.9/km^{2}). The racial makup of the city was 99.77% White and 0.23% Asian. Hispanic or Latino of any race were 0.23%.

Of the 187 households 27.8% had children under the age of 18 living with them, 54.5% were married couples living together, 8.6% had a female householder with no husband present, and 33.7% were non-families. 30.5% of households were one person and 17.1% were one person aged 65 or older. The average household size was 2.28 and the average family size was 2.82.

The age distribution was 23.0% under the age of 18, 6.6% from 18 to 24, 25.6% from 25 to 44, 24.2% from 45 to 64, and 20.7% 65 or older. The median age was 41 years. For every 100 females, there were 86.0 males. For every 100 females age 18 and over, there were 85.3 males.

The median household income was $35,313 and the median family income was $47,083. Males had a median income of $29,737 versus $21,484 for females. The per capita income for the city was $18,319. About 4.9% of families and 7.2% of the population were below the poverty line, including none of those under age 18 and 14.0% of those age 65 or over.

== Education ==
It is in the Viborg Hurley School District 60-6.

The Viborg and Hurley school districts consolidated in 2013.
