= Cedar Butte, South Dakota =

Unincorporated community in South Dakota, U.S.

Coordinates: 43°34′37″N 101°01′07″W

Cedar Butte is an unincorporated community in Mellette County, in the U.S. state of South Dakota.

== History ==
Cedar Butte was laid out in 1910, taking its name from a local summit noted for its cedar trees. A post office called Cedarbutte was established in 1915.
