= Davis, South Dakota =

- Town
- Location in Turner County and the state of South Dakota
- Coordinates: 43°15′32″N 96°59′56″W
- Country: United States
- State: South Dakota
- County: Turner
- Incorporated (town): 1896

Area
  - Total: 0.43 sq mi (1.11 km^{2})
  - Land: 0.43 sq mi (1.11 km^{2})
  - Water: 0 sq mi (0.00 km^{2})
- Elevation: 1,250 ft (380 m)

Population (2020)
  - Total: 54
  - Density: 125.6/sq mi (48.51/km^{2})
- Time zone: UTC-6 (Central (CST))
  - Summer (DST): UTC-5 (CDT)
- ZIP code: 57021
- Area code: 605
- FIPS code: 46-15540
- GNIS feature ID: 1267349

Davis is a town in east central Turner County, South Dakota, United States. The population was 54 at the 2020 census.

Davis was founded in 1893, and named for either Edna V. Davis, a local landowner, or J. A. Davis, owner of the town site.

== Geography ==
According to the United States Census Bureau, the town has a total area of 0.43 square miles (1.11 km^{2}), all land.

== Demographics ==
Historical population
| Census | Pop. | Note | %± |
|---|---|---|---|
| 1900 | 151 | | — |
| 1910 | 164 | | 8.6% |
| 1920 | 245 | | 49.4% |
| 1930 | 209 | | −14.7% |
| 1940 | 230 | | 10.0% |
| 1950 | 153 | | −33.5% |
| 1960 | 124 | | −19.0% |
| 1970 | 101 | | −18.5% |
| 1980 | 100 | | −1.0% |
| 1990 | 87 | | −13.0% |
| 2000 | 104 | | 19.5% |
| 2010 | 85 | | −18.3% |
| 2020 | 54 | | −36.5% |
U.S. Decennial Census

=== 2010 census ===
As of the census of 2010, there were 85 people, 41 households, and 24 families residing in the town. The population density was 197.7 inhabitants per square mile (76.3/km^{2}). There were 51 housing units at an average density of 118.6 units per square mile (45.8 units/km^{2}). The racial makeup of the town was 100.0% White.

There were 41 households, of which 22.0% had children under the age of 18 living with them, 51.2% were married couples living together, 2.4% had a female householder with no husband present, 4.9% had a male householder with no wife present, and 41.5% were non-families. 34.1% of all households were made up of individuals, and 9.8% had someone living alone who was 65 years of age or older. The average household size was 2.07 and the average family size was 2.58.

The median age in the town was 48.5 years. 16.5% of residents were under the age of 18; 4.7% were between the ages of 18 and 24; 21.2% were from 25 to 44; 41.2% were from 45 to 64; and 16.5% were 65 years of age or older. The gender makeup of the town was 49.4% male and 50.6% female.

=== 2000 census ===
As of the census of 2000, there were 104 people, 49 households, and 29 families residing in the town. The population density was 238.2 inhabitants per square mile (92.0/km^{2}). There were 55 housing units at an average density of 126.0 units per square mile (48.6 units/km^{2}). The racial makeup of the town was 98.08% White, and 1.92% from two or more races.

There were 49 households, out of which 16.3% had children under the age of 18 living with them, 57.1% were married couples living together, 2.0% had a female householder with no husband present, and 40.8% were non-families. 36.7% of all households were made up of individuals, and 18.4% had someone living alone who was 65 years of age or older. The average household size was 2.12 and the average family size was 2.83.

In the town, the population was spread out, with 20.2% under the age of 18, 9.6% from 18 to 24, 19.2% from 25 to 44, 33.7% from 45 to 64, and 17.3% who were 65 years of age or older. The median age was 46 years. For every 100 females, there were 103.9 males. For every 100 females age 18 and over, there were 107.5 males.

The median income for a household in the town was $32,813, and the median income for a family was $46,250. Males had a median income of $26,458 versus $21,250 for females. The per capita income for the town was $17,112. None of the population or families were below the poverty line.

== Education ==
It is in the Viborg Hurley School District 60-6. The consolidated district started operations in 2013.

Previously Davis was in the Hurley School District 60-2.
