= Centerville, South Dakota =

Centerville
- City
- Centerville, South Dakota
- Motto: "Where YOU Make a Difference"
- Location in Turner County and the state of South Dakota
- Coordinates: 43°07′00″N 96°57′34″W
- Country: United States
- State: South Dakota
- County: Turner
- Incorporated: 1894

Area
  - Total: 0.72 sq mi (1.86 km^{2})
  - Land: 0.72 sq mi (1.86 km^{2})
  - Water: 0 sq mi (0.00 km^{2})
- Elevation: 1,227 ft (374 m)

Population (2020)
  - Total: 918
  - Density: 1,276/sq mi (492.6/km^{2})
- Time zone: UTC-6 (Central (CST))
  - Summer (DST): UTC-5 (CDT)
- ZIP code: 57014
- Area code: 605
- FIPS code: 46-11060
- GNIS feature ID: 1267316
- Website: City of Centerville

Centerville is a city in Turner County, South Dakota, United States. The population was 918 at the 2020 census. Centerville is part of the Sioux Falls, South Dakota metropolitan area.

== History ==
Centerville was platted in 1883. It was named due to its location between Parker and Vermillion.

One of the most powerful tornadoes in the 2003 South Dakota tornado outbreak was located around Centerville and was rated an F-2 on the Fujita scale. It had maximum winds of 135 miles per hour and caused damage in the town of Centerville and surrounding areas. No fatalities were reported with this tornado. Along with the F-2 tornado that was reported, 19 other tornadoes touched down within a 50-mile radius of Centerville.

== Geography ==
According to the United States Census Bureau, the city has a total area of 0.72 square miles (1.86 km^{2}), all land.

=== Climate ===
Climate data for Centerville 6 SE, South Dakota (1991−2020 normals, extremes 1905−present)
Month	Jan	Feb	Mar	Apr	May	Jun	Jul	Aug	Sep	Oct	Nov	Dec	Year
Record high °F (°C)	70 (21)	73 (23)	92 (33)	97 (36)	109 (43)	108 (42)	113 (45)	111 (44)	106 (41)	95 (35)	82 (28)	67 (19)	113 (45)
Mean maximum °F (°C)	50.0 (10.0)	54.9 (12.7)	72.2 (22.3)	83.2 (28.4)	89.9 (32.2)	94.5 (34.7)	94.9 (34.9)	93.6 (34.2)	90.4 (32.4)	84.2 (29.0)	68.8 (20.4)	51.3 (10.7)	97.5 (36.4)
Mean daily maximum °F (°C)	26.9 (−2.8)	31.9 (−0.1)	44.9 (7.2)	58.5 (14.7)	70.2 (21.2)	80.4 (26.9)	84.4 (29.1)	81.9 (27.7)	75.4 (24.1)	61.5 (16.4)	45.1 (7.3)	31.3 (−0.4)	57.7 (14.3)
Daily mean °F (°C)	16.9 (−8.4)	21.4 (−5.9)	33.9 (1.1)	46.3 (7.9)	58.5 (14.7)	69.3 (20.7)	73.0 (22.8)	70.5 (21.4)	62.5 (16.9)	48.8 (9.3)	33.9 (1.1)	21.6 (−5.8)	46.4 (8.0)
Mean daily minimum °F (°C)	6.8 (−14.0)	11.0 (−11.7)	22.9 (−5.1)	34.0 (1.1)	46.8 (8.2)	58.1 (14.5)	61.7 (16.5)	59.1 (15.1)	49.6 (9.8)	36.1 (2.3)	22.7 (−5.2)	12.0 (−11.1)	35.1 (1.7)
Mean minimum °F (°C)	−16.3 (−26.8)	−10.5 (−23.6)	−0.1 (−17.8)	17.7 (−7.9)	32.2 (0.1)	45.2 (7.3)	48.9 (9.4)	46.4 (8.0)	32.4 (0.2)	18.8 (−7.3)	2.5 (−16.4)	−10.4 (−23.6)	−20.4 (−29.1)
Record low °F (°C)	−44 (−42)	−35 (−37)	−21 (−29)	−6 (−21)	19 (−7)	33 (1)	38 (3)	32 (0)	19 (−7)	−6 (−21)	−20 (−29)	−39 (−39)	−44 (−42)
Average precipitation inches (mm)	0.44 (11)	0.63 (16)	1.38 (35)	2.69 (68)	3.87 (98)	4.29 (109)	3.05 (77)	3.20 (81)	3.12 (79)	2.32 (59)	1.23 (31)	0.66 (17)	26.88 (683)
Average snowfall inches (cm)	5.2 (13)	6.0 (15)	4.5 (11)	2.9 (7.4)	0.1 (0.25)	0.0 (0.0)	0.0 (0.0)	0.0 (0.0)	0.0 (0.0)	0.7 (1.8)	5.0 (13)	6.1 (15)	30.5 (77)
Average precipitation days (≥ 0.01 in)	5.3	5.2	6.3	9.7	12.6	11.2	8.3	9.6	8.1	7.5	4.9	5.2	93.9
Average snowy days (≥ 0.1 in)	4.8	4.2	2.8	1.6	0.1	0.0	0.0	0.0	0.0	0.5	2.4	4.3	20.7
Source: NOAA

== Demographics ==
Historical population
Census	Pop.	Note	%±
1890	723		—
1900	871		20.5%
1910	971		11.5%
1920	1,104		13.7%
1930	1,169		5.9%
1940	1,046		−10.5%
1950	1,053		0.7%
1960	887		−15.8%
1970	910		2.6%
1980	892		−2.0%
1990	887		−0.6%
2000	910		2.6%
2010	882		−3.1%
2020	918		4.1%
U.S. Decennial Census

=== 2020 census ===
As of the 2020 census, Centerville had a population of 918. The median age was 39.6 years, with 28.1% of residents under the age of 18 and 20.4% of residents 65 years of age or older. For every 100 females there were 96.2 males, and for every 100 females age 18 and over there were 89.7 males age 18 and over.

0.0% of residents lived in urban areas, while 100.0% lived in rural areas.

There were 379 households in Centerville, of which 33.5% had children under the age of 18 living in them. Of all households, 46.2% were married-couple households, 17.4% were households with a male householder and no spouse or partner present, and 31.4% were households with a female householder and no spouse or partner present. About 34.8% of all households were made up of individuals and 18.7% had someone living alone who was 65 years of age or older.

There were 420 housing units, of which 9.8% were vacant. The homeowner vacancy rate was 3.8% and the rental vacancy rate was 8.0%.

Racial composition as of the 2020 census
Race	Number	Percent
White	869	94.7%
Black or African American	7	0.8%
American Indian and Alaska Native	1	0.1%
Asian	1	0.1%
Native Hawaiian and Other Pacific Islander	0	0.0%
Some other race	6	0.7%
Two or more races	34	3.7%
Hispanic or Latino (of any race)	27	2.9%

=== 2010 census ===
As of the census of 2010, there were 882 people, 374 households, and 231 families living in the city. The population density was 1,225.0 inhabitants per square mile (473.0/km^{2}). There were 425 housing units at an average density of 590.3 per square mile (227.9/km^{2}). The racial makeup of the city was 98.2% White, 0.3% African American, 0.6% Native American, 0.2% Asian, 0.1% from other races, and 0.6% from two or more races. Hispanic or Latino of any race were 1.2% of the population.

There were 374 households, of which 27.5% had children under the age of 18 living with them, 50.5% were married couples living together, 6.4% had a female householder with no husband present, 4.8% had a male householder with no wife present, and 38.2% were non-families. 34.2% of all households were made up of individuals, and 17.9% had someone living alone who was 65 years of age or older. The average household size was 2.27 and the average family size was 2.91.

The median age in the city was 39.9 years. 23.9% of residents were under the age of 18; 8% were between the ages of 18 and 24; 22.5% were from 25 to 44; 24.7% were from 45 to 64; and 20.9% were 65 years of age or older. The gender makeup of the city was 50.0% male and 50.0% female.

=== 2000 census ===
As of the census of 2000, there were 910 people, 387 households, and 236 families living in the city. The population density was 1,265.9 inhabitants per square mile (488.8/km^{2}). There were 429 housing units at an average density of 596.8 per square mile (230.4/km^{2}). The racial makeup of the city was 99.34% White, 0.11% Native American, 0.11% Asian, and 0.44% from two or more races. Hispanic or Latino of any race were 0.66% of the population.

There were 387 households, out of which 26.1% had children under the age of 18 living with them, 50.9% were married couples living together, 6.7% had a female householder with no husband present, and 38.8% were non-families. 35.4% of all households were made up of individuals, and 22.5% had someone living alone who was 65 years of age or older. The average household size was 2.23 and the average family size was 2.90.

In the city, the population was spread out, with 23.6% under the age of 18, 6.3% from 18 to 24, 22.2% from 25 to 44, 20.2% from 45 to 64, and 27.7% who were 65 years of age or older. The median age was 44 years. For every 100 females, there were 87.2 males. For every 100 females age 18 and over, there were 81.9 males.

The median income for a household in the city was $29,615, and the median income for a family was $39,643. Males had a median income of $27,171 versus $20,000 for females. The per capita income for the city was $17,089. About 4.2% of families and 8.2% of the population were below the poverty line, including 2.3% of those under age 18 and 19.1% of those age 65 or over.

== Notable people ==
- Clinton P. Anderson, Representative and Senator from New Mexico
- Ivan Dmitri (1900 – 1968), artist and photographer, was born in Centerville.
