= Marion, South Dakota =

- City
- Motto: "The Right Place To Call Home"
- Location in Turner County and the state of South Dakota
- Coordinates: 43°25′25″N 97°15′38″W
- Country: United States
- State: South Dakota
- County: Turner
- Incorporated: 1881

Area
  - Total: 0.87 sq mi (2.25 km^{2})
  - Land: 0.87 sq mi (2.25 km^{2})
  - Water: 0 sq mi (0.00 km^{2})
- Elevation: 1,450 ft (440 m)

Population (2020)
  - Total: 849
  - Density: 978.4/sq mi (377.75/km^{2})
- Time zone: UTC-6 (Central (CST))
  - Summer (DST): UTC-5 (CDT)
- ZIP code: 57043
- Area code: 605
- FIPS code: 46-40860
- GNIS feature ID: 1267470
- Website: marionsd.com

Marion is a city in Turner County, South Dakota, United States. The population was 849 at the 2020 census.

== History ==
Marion was laid out in 1879, and named in honor of a railroad employee's daughter.

== Geography ==
According to the United States Census Bureau, the city has a total area of 0.87 square miles (2.25 km^{2}), all land.

== Demographics ==
Historical population
| Census | Pop. | Note | %± |
|---|---|---|---|
| 1900 | 338 | | — |
| 1910 | 462 | | 36.7% |
| 1920 | 535 | | 15.8% |
| 1930 | 704 | | 31.6% |
| 1940 | 765 | | 8.7% |
| 1950 | 794 | | 3.8% |
| 1960 | 843 | | 6.2% |
| 1970 | 844 | | 0.1% |
| 1980 | 830 | | −1.7% |
| 1990 | 831 | | 0.1% |
| 2000 | 892 | | 7.3% |
| 2010 | 784 | | −12.1% |
| 2020 | 849 | | 8.3% |
U.S. Decennial Census

=== 2020 census ===
As of the 2020 census, Marion had a population of 849, and the median age was 50.0 years. 22.7% of residents were under the age of 18, while 29.4% were 65 years of age or older. For every 100 females there were 85.8 males, and for every 100 females age 18 and over there were 84.8 males age 18 and over.

0.0% of residents lived in urban areas, while 100.0% lived in rural areas.

There were 360 households in Marion, of which 26.4% had children under the age of 18 living in them. Of all households, 46.7% were married-couple households, 20.0% were households with a male householder and no spouse or partner present, and 28.1% were households with a female householder and no spouse or partner present. About 38.9% of all households were made up of individuals and 24.5% had someone living alone who was 65 years of age or older.

There were 380 housing units, of which 5.3% were vacant. The homeowner vacancy rate was 1.8% and the rental vacancy rate was 5.9%.

Racial composition as of the 2020 census
| Race | Number | Percent |
|---|---|---|
| White | 789 | 92.9% |
| Black or African American | 4 | 0.5% |
| American Indian and Alaska Native | 4 | 0.5% |
| Asian | 0 | 0.0% |
| Native Hawaiian and Other Pacific Islander | 0 | 0.0% |
| Some other race | 12 | 1.4% |
| Two or more races | 40 | 4.7% |
| Hispanic or Latino (of any race) | 33 | 3.9% |

=== 2010 census ===
As of the census of 2010, there were 784 people, 351 households, and 212 families residing in the city. The population density was 901.1 inhabitants per square mile (347.9/km^{2}). There were 384 housing units at an average density of 441.4 per square mile (170.4/km^{2}). The racial makeup of the city was 97.2% White, 0.4% African American, 1.1% Native American, 0.1% Asian, 0.4% from other races, and 0.8% from two or more races. Hispanic or Latino of any race were 2.2% of the population.

There were 351 households, of which 21.7% had children under the age of 18 living with them, 51.9% were married couples living together, 6.3% had a female householder with no husband present, 2.3% had a male householder with no wife present, and 39.6% were non-families. 35.6% of all households were made up of individuals, and 24.8% had someone living alone who was 65 years of age or older. The average household size was 2.09 and the average family size was 2.67.

The median age in the city was 52.3 years. 17.6% of residents were under the age of 18; 5.3% were between the ages of 18 and 24; 16.9% were from 25 to 44; 28.1% were from 45 to 64; and 32% were 65 years of age or older. The gender makeup of the city was 45.7% male and 54.3% female.

=== 2000 census ===
As of the census of 2000, there were 892 people, 350 households, and 232 families residing in the city. The population density was 1,026.9 inhabitants per square mile (396.5/km^{2}). There were 377 housing units at an average density of 434.0 per square mile (167.6/km^{2}). The racial makeup of the city was 98.99% White, 0.34% Native American, 0.56% from other races, and 0.11% from two or more races. Hispanic or Latino of any race were 1.68% of the population.

There were 350 households, out of which 30.9% had children under the age of 18 living with them, 57.7% were married couples living together, 4.9% had a female householder with no husband present, and 33.7% were non-families. 32.3% of all households were made up of individuals, and 21.4% had someone living alone who was 65 years of age or older. The average household size was 2.39 and the average family size was 3.02.

In the city, the population was spread out, with 25.1% under the age of 18, 5.4% from 18 to 24, 20.5% from 25 to 44, 19.7% from 45 to 64, and 29.3% who were 65 years of age or older. The median age was 44 years. For every 100 females, there were 87.4 males. For every 100 females age 18 and over, there were 81.5 males.

The median income for a household in the city was $36,406, and the median income for a family was $43,375. Males had a median income of $30,417 versus $20,341 for females. The per capita income for the city was $16,125. About 1.3% of families and 3.8% of the population were below the poverty line, including 2.3% of those under age 18 and 8.8% of those age 65 or over.

== Notable people ==
- Frank Bausch was an American football offensive lineman in the NFL.
- Jim Bausch was an American football halfback in the NFL.
