= Viborg, South Dakota =

- City
- Location in Turner County and the state of South Dakota
- Coordinates: 43°10′20″N 97°04′57″W
- Country: United States
- State: South Dakota
- County: Turner
- <-- Incorporated (town) -->: 1903

Area
  - Total: 0.52 sq mi (1.34 km^{2})
  - Land: 0.52 sq mi (1.34 km^{2})
  - Water: 0 sq mi (0.00 km^{2})
- Elevation: 1,306 ft (398 m)

Population (2020)
  - Total: 814
  - Density: 1,568.8/sq mi (605.72/km^{2})
- Time zone: UTC-6 (Central (CST))
  - Summer (DST): UTC-5 (CDT)
- ZIP code: 57070
- Area code: 605
- FIPS code: 46-67020
- GNIS feature ID: 1267614
- Website: https://www.viborgsd.org/

Viborg (/vaɪˈbɜːrɡ/; VY-burg) is a city in Turner County, South Dakota, United States. The population was 814 at the 2020 census.

== History ==
Founded by Danish Americans, the city is named after the Danish city of Viborg. The area was first settled by Danish migrants in the 1860s, founding a community known as Daneville. With the advent of the railway in 1893, a new settlement closer to the railway was created as Viborg. Viborg was incorporated as a city on August 25, 1903.

On June 7th, 1965, an F4 tornado passed just north of the town, killing a farmer and damaging several buildings in the area.

== Geography ==
According to the United States Census Bureau, the city has a total area of 0.40 square miles (1.04 km^{2}), all land.

== Demographics ==
Historical population
Census	Pop.	Note	%±
1900	222		—
1910	410		84.7%
1920	618		50.7%
1930	719		16.3%
1940	659		−8.3%
1950	644		−2.3%
1960	699		8.5%
1970	662		−5.3%
1980	812		22.7%
1990	763		−6.0%
2000	832		9.0%
2010	782		−6.0%
2020	814		4.1%
U.S. Decennial Census

=== 2020 census ===
As of the 2020 census, Viborg had a population of 814. The median age was 42.9 years. 24.0% of residents were under the age of 18 and 25.8% of residents were 65 years of age or older. For every 100 females there were 91.5 males, and for every 100 females age 18 and over there were 87.6 males age 18 and over.

0.0% of residents lived in urban areas, while 100.0% lived in rural areas.

There were 357 households in Viborg, of which 22.1% had children under the age of 18 living in them. Of all households, 41.2% were married-couple households, 23.0% were households with a male householder and no spouse or partner present, and 29.7% were households with a female householder and no spouse or partner present. About 44.0% of all households were made up of individuals and 25.2% had someone living alone who was 65 years of age or older.

There were 420 housing units, of which 15.0% were vacant. The homeowner vacancy rate was 2.1% and the rental vacancy rate was 10.6%.

Racial composition as of the 2020 census
Race	Number	Percent
White	732	89.9%
Black or African American	7	0.9%
American Indian and Alaska Native	18	2.2%
Asian	2	0.2%
Native Hawaiian and Other Pacific Islander	0	0.0%
Some other race	20	2.5%
Two or more races	35	4.3%
Hispanic or Latino (of any race)	33	4.1%

=== 2010 census ===
As of the census of 2010, there were 782 people, 360 households, and 189 families living in the city. The population density was 1,955.0 inhabitants per square mile (754.8/km^{2}). There were 429 housing units at an average density of 1,072.5 per square mile (414.1/km^{2}). The racial makeup of the city was 98.6% White, 0.8% Native American, and 0.6% from two or more races. Hispanic or Latino of any race were 0.6% of the population.

There were 360 households, of which 21.1% had children under the age of 18 living with them, 39.7% were married couples living together, 9.2% had a female householder with no husband present, 3.6% had a male householder with no wife present, and 47.5% were non-families. 43.6% of all households were made up of individuals, and 21.9% had someone living alone who was 65 years of age or older. The average household size was 1.98 and the average family size was 2.69.

The median age in the city was 51.3 years. 18.9% of residents were under the age of 18; 6.7% were between the ages of 18 and 24; 16.9% were from 25 to 44; 24.9% were from 45 to 64; and 32.5% were 65 years of age or older. The gender makeup of the city was 46.2% male and 53.8% female.

=== 2000 census ===
At the 2000 census, there were 832 people, 366 households and 211 families living in the city. The population density was 2,147.1 inhabitants per square mile (829.0/km^{2}). There were 403 housing units at an average density of 1,040.0 per square mile (401.5/km^{2}). The racial makeup of the city was 99.40% White, 0.24% Native American, 0.12% Asian, and 0.24% from two or more races. Hispanic or Latino of any race were 0.12% of the population.

There were 366 households, of which 22.7% had children under the age of 18 living with them, 48.9% were married couples living together, 6.0% had a female householder with no husband present, and 42.1% were non-families. 39.6% of all households were made up of individuals, and 24.3% had someone living alone who was 65 years of age or older. The average household size was 2.11 and the average family size was 2.85.

20.0% of the population were under the age of 18, 6.6% from 18 to 24, 20.3% from 25 to 44, 18.4% from 45 to 64, and 34.7% who were 65 years of age or older. The median age was 47 years. For every 100 females, there were 79.3 males. For every 100 females age 18 and over, there were 76.2 males.

The median household income was $29,231 and the median family income was $39,327. Males had a median income of $27,337 versus $20,625 for females. The per capita income for the city was $17,738. About 5.2% of families and 6.4% of the population were below the poverty line, including 3.2% of those under age 18 and 10.5% of those age 65 or over.

== Education ==
It is in the Viborg Hurley School District 60-6.

The Viborg and Hurley school districts consolidated in 2013.

== Notable people ==
- Max Gors, American jurist, former Associate Justice of the South Dakota Supreme Court
- Alvin Hansen, former professor of economics at Harvard University
- Steven R. Jensen, American jurist, Chief Justice of the South Dakota Supreme Court
- Crystal Johnson, current States Attorney for Minnehaha County
- Tom Jones, former state legislator
- Emmett Nelson, former pitcher of the Cincinnati Reds
- Roberta Rasmussen, former state legislator
