= Parker, South Dakota =

City in South Dakota, U.S.

Parker
- City
- Parker, South Dakota
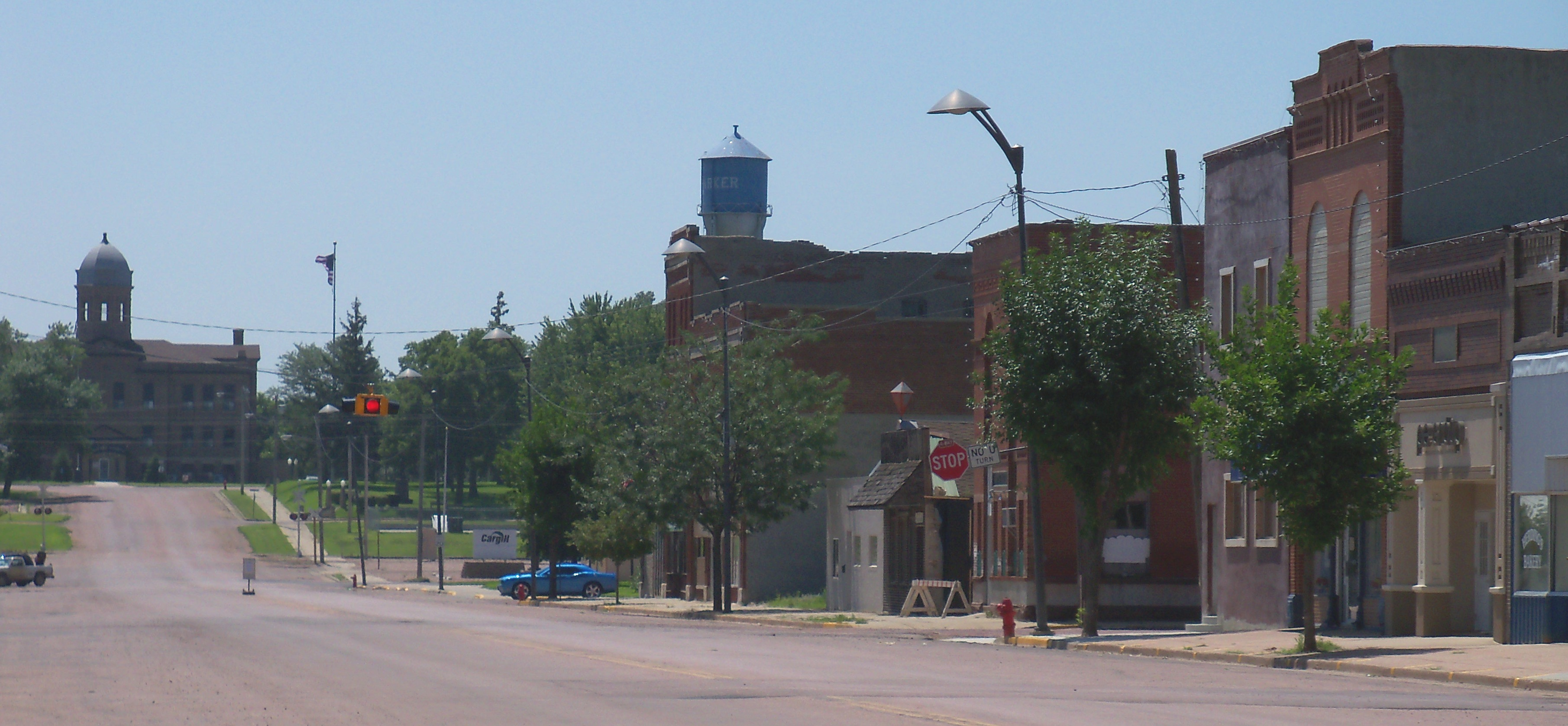
- Downtown Parker, South Dakota
- Motto: "Life's A Little Bigger In A Small Town"
- Location in Turner County and the state of South Dakota
- Coordinates: 43°24′02″N 97°07′48″W
- Country: United States
- State: South Dakota
- County: Turner
- Incorporated: 1883

Area
  - Total: 1.17 sq mi (3.04 km^{2})
  - Land: 1.17 sq mi (3.04 km^{2})
  - Water: 0 sq mi (0.00 km^{2})
- Elevation: 1,342 ft (409 m)

Population (2020)
  - Total: 1,194
  - Density: 1,018.5/sq mi (393.25/km^{2})
- Time zone: UTC−6 (Central (CST))
  - Summer (DST): UTC−5 (CDT)
- ZIP code: 57053
- Area code: 605
- FIPS code: 46-48380
- GNIS feature ID: 1267527
- Website: City of Parker

Parker is a city in Turner County, South Dakota, United States. The population was 1,194 at the 2020 census. It is the county seat of Turner County. Parker is bordered on its eastern side by South Dakota State Highway 19. Its northern side is bordered by South Dakota State Highway 44. Parker is located approximately 8 miles (13 km) northwest of Chancellor, 42 miles (68 km) east of Parkston and 41 miles (66 km) south of Madison.

== History ==
Parker was established in 1879 as county seat; it was incorporated as a city in 1883. The name Parker was the maiden name of a railroad official's wife.

== Geography ==
According to the United States Census Bureau, the city has a total area of 1.15 square miles (2.98 km^{2}), all land.

== Demographics ==
Historical population
Census	Pop.	Note	%±
1880	113		—
1890	728		544.2%
1900	893		22.7%
1910	1,224		37.1%
1920	1,288		5.2%
1930	1,229		−4.6%
1940	1,244		1.2%
1950	1,148		−7.7%
1960	1,142		−0.5%
1970	1,005		−12.0%
1980	999		−0.6%
1990	984		−1.5%
2000	1,031		4.8%
2010	1,022		−0.9%
2020	1,194		16.8%
U.S. Decennial Census; 2018 Estimate

=== 2020 census ===
As of the 2020 census, Parker had a population of 1,194. The median age was 36.8 years. 28.7% of residents were under the age of 18 and 17.9% of residents were 65 years of age or older. For every 100 females there were 93.2 males, and for every 100 females age 18 and over there were 97.4 males age 18 and over.

0.0% of residents lived in urban areas, while 100.0% lived in rural areas.

There were 470 households in Parker, of which 33.8% had children under the age of 18 living in them. Of all households, 53.6% were married-couple households, 17.9% were households with a male householder and no spouse or partner present, and 21.1% were households with a female householder and no spouse or partner present. About 30.6% of all households were made up of individuals and 16.6% had someone living alone who was 65 years of age or older.

There were 511 housing units, of which 8.0% were vacant. The homeowner vacancy rate was 0.8% and the rental vacancy rate was 16.5%.

Racial composition as of the 2020 census
Race	Number	Percent
White	1,091	91.4%
Black or African American	4	0.3%
American Indian and Alaska Native	6	0.5%
Asian	3	0.3%
Native Hawaiian and Other Pacific Islander	0	0.0%
Some other race	23	1.9%
Two or more races	67	5.6%
Hispanic or Latino (of any race)	50	4.2%

=== 2010 census ===
As of the census of 2010, there were 1,022 people, 438 households, and 292 families living in the city. The population density was 888.7 inhabitants per square mile (343.1/km^{2}). There were 489 housing units at an average density of 425.2 per square mile (164.2/km^{2}). The racial makeup of the city was 95.6% White, 0.3% African American, 0.4% Native American, 0.1% Asian, 0.2% Pacific Islander, and 1.5% from two or more races. Hispanic or Latino of any race were 2.0% of the population.

There were 438 households, of which 32.0% had children under the age of 18 living with them, 54.8% were married couples living together, 7.3% had a female householder with no husband present, 4.6% had a male householder with no wife present, and 33.3% were non-families. 29.9% of all households were made up of individuals, and 16% had someone living alone who was 65 years of age or older. The average household size was 2.33 and the average family size was 2.85.

The median age in the city was 39.8 years. 25.3% of residents were under the age of 18; 5% were between the ages of 18 and 24; 26.4% were from 25 to 44; 25.4% were from 45 to 64; and 17.9% were 65 years of age or older. The gender makeup of the city was 48.6% male and 51.4% female.

=== 2000 census ===
As of the census of 2000, there were 1,031 people, 431 households, and 293 families living in the city. The population density was 1,106.5 inhabitants per square mile (427.2/km^{2}). There were 450 housing units at an average density of 482.9 per square mile (186.4/km^{2}). The racial makeup of the city was 97.96% White, 0.39% African American, 0.48% Native American, 0.10% Asian, and 1.07% from two or more races. Hispanic or Latino of any race were 0.39% of the population.

There were 431 households, out of which 29.7% had children under the age of 18 living with them, 57.1% were married couples living together, 8.6% had a female householder with no husband present, and 32.0% were non-families. 28.8% of all households were made up of individuals, and 17.2% had someone living alone who was 65 years of age or older. The average household size was 2.34 and the average family size was 2.88.

In the city, the population was spread out, with 24.2% under the age of 18, 5.7% from 18 to 24, 26.0% from 25 to 44, 21.0% from 45 to 64, and 23.0% who were 65 years of age or older. The median age was 41 years. For every 100 females, there were 94.9 males. For every 100 females age 18 and over, there were 89.1 males.

As of 2000 the median income for a household in the city was $37,250, and the median income for a family was $44,226. Males had a median income of $28,698 versus $20,909 for females. The per capita income for the city was $17,225. About 7.7% of families and 7.4% of the population were below the poverty line, including 5.7% of those under age 18 and 12.6% of those age 65 or over.

== County fair ==
Parker hosts the Turner County Fair, the oldest county fair in South Dakota, for most of its years since the first fair in 1880. The Turner County Fair now hosts its own website, which details the fair's attractions, history, the school houses of Turner County, and annual grounds happenings.

== Education ==
The Parker School District was established in 1889 and has a long standing tradition of excellence in education, receiving the national Blue Ribbon Award for academic excellence in 2012 and was recognized by the governor for being a distinguished district for seven years in a row.

The district added a new elementary school building in 2022 as a part of ongoing expansion efforts.

Nicknamed the "Pheasants", their high school sports teams have achieved great success. Gayle Hoover coached the boys basketball teams from 1959-1993 and retired as the states all-time winningest basketball coach with 577 wins. Jill Christensen coached the volleyball program from 1983-2018 and as of 2023 is the states all-time winningest coach regardless of sport with 837 career wins. Both were inducted into the South Dakota sports hall of fame.
