= Freya Manfred =

American poet (born 1944)

Freya Manfred (born November 28, 1944, in Minneapolis, Minnesota), is a modern American poet. She is the oldest child of American novelist Frederick Manfred (Feike Feikema) and Maryanna Shorba Manfred. Her younger siblings are Marya Manfred and Frederick Manfred Junior.

== Early life and career ==
The Manfred family lived in Bloomington, Minnesota, for the first fifteen years of Freya's life. Here, she began writing illustrated poems and stories at the age of four. In 1959, the family moved to the prairie town of Luverne, Minnesota, where they built a home which is now the Interpretive Center for Blue Mounds State Park.

Freya attended Macalester College, where she majored in Art and English and graduated in 1966, summa cum laude. She received her MA in English at Stanford University in 1968. From 1968 to 1971 Freya taught creative writing and Freshman English at the University of South Dakota. From 1972 to 1980 she taught poetry workshops for grade school, middle school, high school, and college students for the National Endowment for the Arts in South Dakota, Minnesota, Massachusetts, New Hampshire, Vermont, and California.

In 1972 American poet, James A. Wright, nominated Freya's first book of poetry, A Goldenrod Will Grow (Thueson Press, 1971) for a Lamont Poetry Award. Her second book of poetry was Yellow Squash Woman (Thorp Springs Press, 1976). In 1975 American poet, Robert Bly nominated her for a Harvard/Radcliffe Grant, which resulted in the publication of her third book of poetry, American Roads (The Overlook Press, 1980). She also won an NEA Grant in 1980.

== Later life and career ==
In 1976 Freya married Thomas Whiting Pope, a Hollywood screenwriter, and later college professor. In 1980 they moved to Ojai, California, where their twin sons, Nicholas Bly Pope and Ethan Rowan Pope, were born. In 1983, the family moved to Bloomington, Minnesota.

Freya Manfred's last five collections of poetry were published by Scott King's Red Dragonfly Press. Her sixth collection, Swimming With A Hundred Year Old Snapping Turtle, won the 2009 Midwest Booksellers' Choice Award for Poetry. Her eighth collection is Speak, Mother, 2015. Her award-winning poetry has also appeared in over 100 reviews and magazines and over 50 anthologies.

Freya's first memoir, Frederick Manfred: A Daughter Remembers, (Minnesota Historical Society Press, 1999) was nominated for a Minnesota Book Award and an Iowa Historical Society Award. Philip Roth says, "This rare book about the intimacy between a father and his daughter is notable for its affection, sensitivity, generosity, and gratitude. In a larger sense it is the revealing examination of an American writer's lifelong struggle with his material and with his cultural fate." Her 2015 memoir from Nodin Press is Raising Twins: A True Life Adventure.

== Poetic identity ==
Nature and human relationships are the primary sources of Freya's poetry. A longtime Midwesterner, who has lived on both coasts, her poems often reflect a life lived near lakes, rivers, valleys, trees and animals. She values a poetry of place, what James A Wright once described as "A genius of place – a presiding presence in each place." Poet Robert Bly says, "What I like in [Freya's] poems is that they are not floating around in the air or the intellect. The body takes them in. They are brave. The reader and the writer meet each other in the body." Philip Roth says, "Freya Manfred always amazes me by how close she gets to everything she sees."

== Works ==
A Goldenrod Will Grow (1971), Groveland Press

Yellow Squash Woman (1976), Thorp Springs Press

American Roads (1979), Overlook/Viking Press

Frederick Manfred: A Daughter Remembers (1999), Minnesota Historical Society Press

Flesh and Blood (2000), Red Dragonfly Press

My Only Home (2003), Red Dragonfly Press

Swimming With a Hundred Year Old Snapping Turtle (2008), Red Dragonfly Press

The Blue Dress (2012), Red Dragonfly Press

Raising Twins: A Real Life Adventure (2015), Nodin Press

Speak, Mother (2015), Nodin Press
