= Golden Bowl =

Golden Bowl may refer to:

- The Golden Bowl, a 1904 novel by Henry James
  - The Golden Bowl (TV series), a 1972 BBC series adapted from James's novel
  - The Golden Bowl (film), a 2000 film adapted from James's novel
- The Golden Bowl (Manfred), a 1944 novel by Frederick Manfred
- Goldenbowl lily, a member of the genus Calochortus

== See also ==
- Golden bowl of Hasanlu, an ancient artefact from Iran
