= Michael Cimino =

American filmmaker (1939–2016)

- Cimino in 1981
- Born: Michael Antonio Cimino Jr. February 3, 1939; New York City, U.S.
- Died: July 2, 2016 (aged 77); Beverly Hills, California, U.S.
- Education: Michigan State University (BA); Yale University (BFA, MFA)
- Occupations: Film director; screenwriter; producer; author; songwriter
- Years active: 1972–2016
- Partners: Joann Carelli (1967–1975); Nongnuj Timruang (1977); Carina Fitzalan-Howard (1982); Barbra Streisand (1983); Alexandra Tydings (1996); Yvonne Sciò (2002); Kim Swennen (2008–2009)

Michael Antonio Cimino Jr. (/tʃɪˈmiːnoʊ/ chim-EE-noh, Italian: [anˈtɔːnjo tʃiˈmiːno]; February 3, 1939 – July 2, 2016) was an American film director, screenwriter, producer, author and songwriter. Notorious for his obsessive attention to detail and determination for perfection, Cimino achieved widespread fame with The Deer Hunter (1978), which won five Academy Awards, including Best Picture and Best Director.

With a background in painting and architecture, Cimino began his career as a commercial director in New York before moving to Los Angeles in the early 1970s to take up screenwriting. After co-writing the scripts for both Silent Running (1972) and Magnum Force (1973), he wrote the preliminary script for Thunderbolt and Lightfoot (1974). The latter became his directorial debut and one of the highest-grossing films of that year.

The accolades received for co-writing, directing, and producing The Deer Hunter led to Cimino receiving creative control of Heaven's Gate (1980). The film became a critical failure and a box-office bomb, which lost production studio United Artists an estimated $37 million. Its failure was seen by many observers as the end of the New Hollywood era, with studios next shifting focus from director-driven films toward high-concept, crowd-pleasing blockbusters. More recently, however, Heaven's Gate has undergone a dramatic reappraisal, even being named by BBC Culture as one of the greatest American films of all time.

Cimino made only four subsequent films and grew infamous for the number of projects left unfinished due to his uncompromising artistry. In 2002, Cimino claimed he had written at least 50 scripts overall. Several of his ambitious "dream projects" included adaptations of the novels Conquering Horse, The Fountainhead and Man's Fate as well as biopics on crime boss Frank Costello and Irish rebel Michael Collins.

== Early life ==
Cimino publicly shared few details of his early life and family background and is believed to have given false birth year information. Many Cimino biographies thus include inaccuracies about his early years, as well as his background in filmmaking.

Cimino's presumed birth date was February 3, 1939. A third-generation Italian-American, Cimino and his two younger brothers, Peter and Edward, grew up with their parents in the town of Westbury, on Long Island. He was regarded as a prodigy in early private education, but rebelled as an adolescent by consorting with delinquents, getting into fights, and coming home drunk. Of this time, Cimino described himself as

always hanging around with kids my parents didn't approve of. Those guys were so alive. When I was fifteen I spent three weeks driving all over Brooklyn with a guy who was following his girlfriend. He was convinced she was cheating on him, and he had a gun, he was going to kill her. There was such passion and intensity about their lives. When the rich kids got together, the most we ever did was cross against a red light.

His father was a music publisher. Cimino says his father was responsible for marching bands and organs playing pop music at football games. "When my father found out I went into the movie business, he didn't talk to me for a year," Cimino said.

He was very tall and thin... His weight never changed his whole life and he didn't have a gray hair on his head. He was a bit like a Vanderbilt or a Whitney, one of those guys. He was the life of the party, women loved him, a real womanizer. He smoked like a fiend. He loved his martinis. He died really young. He was away a lot, but he was fun. I was just a tiny kid.

His mother was a costume designer. After Cimino made The Deer Hunter, she said that she knew he had become famous because his name was in The New York Times crossword puzzle.

Cimino graduated from Westbury High School in 1956. He entered Michigan State University in East Lansing, Michigan. At Michigan State, Cimino majored in graphic arts, was a member of a weightlifting club, and participated in a group that welcomed incoming students. He graduated in 1959 with honors and won the Harry Suffrin Advertising Award. He was described in the 1959 Red Cedar Log yearbook as having tastes that included blondes, Thelonious Monk, Chico Hamilton, Mort Sahl, Ludwig Mies van der Rohe, Frank Lloyd Wright, and "drinking, preferably vodka."

In Cimino's final year at Michigan State, he became art director, and later managing editor, of the school's humor magazine Spartan. Steven Bach wrote of Cimino's early magazine work:

It is here that one can see what are perhaps the first public manifestations of the Cimino visual sensibility, and they are impressive. He thoroughly restyled the Spartan's derivative Punch look, designing a number of its strikingly handsome covers himself. The Cimino-designed covers are bold and strong, with a sure sense of space and design. They compare favorably to professional work honored in, say, any of the Modern Publicity annuals of the late fifties and are far better than the routine work turned out on Madison Avenue. The impact and quality of his work no doubt contributed to his winning the Harry Suffrin Advertising Award at MSU and perhaps to his acceptance at Yale University.

At Yale, Cimino continued to study painting as well as architecture and art history and became involved in school dramatics. In 1962, while still at Yale, he enlisted in the U.S. Army Reserve. He trained for five months at Fort Dix, New Jersey, and had a month of medical training in Fort Sam Houston, Texas. Cimino graduated from Yale University, receiving his Bachelor of Fine Arts in 1961 and his Master of Fine Arts in 1963, both in painting.

After graduating, Cimino moved to Manhattan and was given a job by Pablo Ferro with a small company that produced documentary and industrial films: "They taught me how to use a Moviola. I operated the Moviola and swept the floors and I was hooked — I decided to become a filmmaker." During this time, he also took ballet classes and studied under Lee Strasberg at the Actors Studio once every week in order to better understand how actors performed.

== Career ==
=== 1960s ===
A still from Cimino's "Take Me Along" commercial

Within eighteen months of directing TV ads, he was hired by Madison Pollack O'Hare to work on special assignments involving "graphic design concepts and unusual approaches to live film". While there, he handpicked the best cameramen MPO employed to shoot his commercials, including Gordon Willis and Owen Roizman, before either rose to fame. He directed ads for L'eggs hosiery, Kool cigarettes, Pepsi, Canada Dry and Maxwell House coffee, among others. "I met some people who were doing fashion stuff – commercials and stills. And there were all these incredibly beautiful girls," Cimino said. "And then, zoom – the next thing I know, overnight, I was directing commercials." Few of Cimino's early commercial work survived.

One of his more successful commercials was shot for United Airlines in 1967. Taking a song called "Take Me Along" from the short-lived Broadway musical, he created an ad in which a group of housewives plead, musically, to their husbands to take them along on their business trips. The commercial is filled with the dynamic visuals, American symbolism and lavish set design that would become Cimino's trademarks. Later that year, he made his most famous commercial; for Eastman Kodak, called "Yesterdays", which went on to win several awards that year. The elaborate commercial took six days to shoot — two on an intricately built set in New York and four on location in Connecticut. Cimino apparently shot close to eight thousand feet of film, which was whittled down to 2 minutes. Although the ads he made were considered among the most prestigious in the industry, they became increasingly costly. "The clients of the agencies liked Cimino," remarked Charles Okun, his production manager from 1964 to 1978. "His visuals were fabulous, but the amount of time it took was just astronomical. Because he was so meticulous and took so long. Nothing was easy with Michael."

At the height of his commercial career, Cimino met Joann Carelli, then a commercial director representative, and the two began to date. Encouraged by Carelli, Cimino began to write screenplays, despite no background in writing. To be more prolific, Cimino sought out collaborators to work with, including poet Thomas McGrath and playwright Deric Washburn, who had produced a one-act play off-Broadway. Washburn later recalled that there was always a big distance, socially, between him and Cimino:

"I remember trying to get to know him a little better. A friend had a house in Poughkeepsie, and I invited him up for the weekend. He shows up in his Rolls-Royce, and he's not comfortable there. But he wanted something from me, I think. Mike and I got closest when we started talking about a story. Then it was amazing. It was like one person. It was like a dance. We could boil together."

Thomas McGrath and Cimino co-wrote two scripts together, Paradise and Kef. McGrath also gave Cimino a copy of the 1959 Frederick Manfred novel Conquering Horse, tracing the history of the Dakota Indians in America before the arrival of the white man, which Cimino would go on throughout the rest of his life to try and make into a film.

=== 1970s ===
By 1970, Cimino's agent Michael Gruskoff was approached with an offer from studio executive Ned Tanen to produce a slate of low-budget films for Universal Pictures, with Conquering Horse among them. The estimated budget for the film had gone far over what initially was projected, and would have cost Universal substantially more than their cut-off figure of $1 million to produce it. Moreover, Cimino wanted to shoot the film in black-and-white and use authentic Sioux dialogue, with subtitles. Shortly after the project was cancelled, Gruskoff assigned Cimino to help draft the script for a story outline by Douglas Trumbull for his science fiction film Silent Running, and he brought aboard Deric Washburn to help. The two morphed the script to be more countercultural. However, Steven Bochco was later brought in and rewrote the story to be less bleak and more "accessible" to a mainstream audience.

The following year, Cimino and Joann Carelli moved to Los Angeles where they rented a house in Hidden Hills that belonged to British director J. Lee Thompson. Carelli told Cimino that the only way he would be able to direct a film is if he wrote an original screenplay and got the biggest star in Hollywood to agree to be in it. Cimino, who had never written on his own, began by writing stories about people he knew about. From this habit, the script for Thunderbolt and Lightfoot was born, which first began as a period story about the Irish outlaw folk heroes Capt. Thunderbolt and Capt. Lightfoot. Cimino gained representation from Stan Kamen of the William Morris Agency, who urged him to make it a contemporary story. Taking both their advice, Cimino took the spec script to Clint Eastwood, who loved it and wanted to direct it himself. Cimino told him that it wasn't for sale, and that he would have to direct the film or else there was no deal. Eastwood agreed, but under one condition: "I'll give you three days. If it doesn't work, I'll get another director." He also asked Cimino to finish John Milius' script treatment for the Dirty Harry sequel Magnum Force, which had a set shooting date. When Magnum Force was in production, Cimino was looking at various locations in Montana and preparing for Thunderbolt and Lightfoot. "We traveled a lot," said Cimino, "especially around the Great Falls; in the banks of the Dearborn and the Missouri; in the fields of wheat, east of Great Falls." In the film, Eastwood plays an aging Korean War veteran who, in the words of Cimino, "has lost his zest for life" and runs into an "exuberant, freedom-loving kid" (played by Jeff Bridges), who restores his youth. Bridges, for his part, felt hugely unprepared for the role, but was quickly reassured:

"Mike looked at me, and said, 'You know that game Tag?' 'Yeah,' I said. 'Well... you're it,' Mike told me. He went on to say that this guy, Lightfoot, was no one other than me, that I couldn't make a mistake, or a false move, even if I wanted to. I've never forgotten that bit of direction that that young director gave me on his first movie, that gift of confidence."

George Kennedy and Geoffrey Lewis were also cast to star in the film, chosen for the primary reason that neither actor had ever done comedic roles before. Cimino had since compared their chemistry in the film to that of Laurel and Hardy. The film shot from July to September with a schedule of forty-seven days on a budget of $4 million. Cimino was careful to make Eastwood happy by keeping things moving quickly and efficiently. "I knew that the only way I could keep control of the movie was to be ahead of schedule," he said. Eastwood was impressed enough with Cimino's work that he allowed him to finish it his way. "I owe such a debt to that man," he later said of Eastwood. The film became a solid box office success at the time grossing $25 million and earned Bridges an Academy Award nomination for Best Supporting Actor.

With the success of Thunderbolt and Lightfoot, Cimino landed a deal at United Artists to write and direct The Fountainhead, based on Ayn Rand's sprawling novel about an architect who refuses to compromise, which he had loved for years. He sent his script to Elliott Kastner, who was going to produce, and his first choice to play the character of Howard Rourk was Clint Eastwood. Taking its cue from more than the novel, Cimino's modern-day adaptation was largely modeled on architect Jørn Utzon's troubled building of the Sydney Opera House, as well as the construction of the Empire State Plaza in Albany, New York. "Making it a contemporary story meant that there was a lot of new work that had to be done [in adapting]," he said. According to Cimino, Eastwood turned the film down over concerns of being compared to his idol Gary Cooper, who had played the same character in the 1949 film adaptation. Over the years he continued to try to get it made, approaching different funding sources with copies of the script and each time rewriting it in the process.

He then worked for a year and a half at Paramount Pictures on a film from his original screenplay Perfect Strangers. Cimino described the film as a political love story that bore "some resemblance to Casablanca, involving the romantic relationship of three people." The film was sold to the studio as "a romantic Z" and was to star Roy Scheider, Romy Schneider and Oskar Werner in the lead roles. Cimino said they had come very close to doing it:

"We'd already shot two weeks of pre-production stuff, but because of various political machinations at the studio, the project fell through. This was just before David Picker left. He was the producer. There were internal difficulties, that's all. Nevertheless, I'd spent a year and a half of my life on something. It had been a difficult time. My father passed away while I was writing the screenplay. I kept working..."

Around this time he also spent two years developing two projects for 20th Century Fox. One film, Pearl, based on an unpublished book he wrote, was to be a musical biopic about singer-songwriter Janis Joplin. Cimino conceived the film's story with producer Marvin Worth and collaborated on the script in association with Oscar-winning screenwriter Bo Goldman. The film was made several years later under a rewritten script titled The Rose, with Joplin's name cut out after her family denied the producers the rights to her story. While Goldman received screenplay credit for his work, Cimino did not. Then, after meeting with James Toback, the two began work on The Life and Dreams of Frank Costello, a biopic chronicling four decades of the life of Mafia boss Frank Costello. Cimino saw the mobster as Gatsby; to him, he had a vision of America. "We got a good screenplay together," said Cimino, "but again, the studio, 20th Century Fox in this case, was going through management changes and the script was put aside." Cimino added, "Costello took a long time because Costello himself had a long, interesting life. The selection of things to film was quite hard." He also did a rewrite for United Artists of Frederick Forsyth's The Dogs of War to be directed by Norman Jewison, and was briefly attached to direct the film after Jewison left.

The film that came closest to production was an original for Paramount, titled Head of the Dragon, that was set in a "mythical South American country" and revolved around a polo-playing WASP who springs a Mafia killer from jail in order to assassinate a rebel leader. The project was described as Cimino's desperate attempt to come up with something commercial that might stand a chance at being made. With location scouting and pre-production work already three weeks in, the film was cancelled, due to issues Paramount was having with their other big production, Sorcerer, which was being shot in the same country. A month later, in October 1976, Cimino took what he thought would be another routine meeting at a production studio, where he gave a 1-hour pitch (with no script), verbally, to EMI executives for his ambitious Vietnam War drama The Deer Hunter. To his surprise, they accepted his pitch and gave him a set start date of March 17, later postponed to June.

I believe that this research is an integral part of the film; the time spent watching people, talking to them, hitting the road, sleeping in those towns, walking down those streets. You notice things, some consciously, others involuntarily, that otherwise... It really approaches the work of an actor, you absorb a number of details; you notice a lot of things which, in a certain way, find their way back into the film.

— Michael Cimino

Derived from some of Cimino's personal experiences, The Deer Hunter tells the story of three blue-collar steelworkers, portrayed by Robert De Niro, John Savage and Christopher Walken, who during the Vietnam War volunteer to serve together. Since he had to spend the next several months prepping for the film and scouting for locations, Cimino brought in Deric Washburn to help him write the film's script. According to Cimino, he would call Washburn every night and feed him lines of dialogue and scenes to write. When Cimino returned, he was shocked with what he read, recalling that he felt it was written by someone who was "mentally deranged". Washburn, who said he couldn't handle the pressure in writing within the time constraint, left the project. From there, Cimino wrote the screenplay by himself within six weeks. "I had to write the thing on buses, on trains, in cars, at night in hotels, I mean I worked like a dog." Despite this, Washburn received sole writer's credit from the Guild after he went to a lawyer demanding arbitration. Roy Scheider was initially considered for the lead role, but after he dropped out, Cimino took the script to Robert De Niro, who insisted that he accompany him for the location scouting. The film also starred John Cazale, who at the time was dying of cancer and was therefore considered a liability by EMI. The steel town of Clairton, Pennsylvania used in the film was not shot there, but was instead composed of eight different towns in four states, including several in Ohio; Cleveland, Steubenville and Mingo Junction. Principal photography began in June 1977, but since the film took place during the winter, everything had to be defoliated; the grass had to be browned and the leaves stripped from the trees, which made the film fall behind schedule. Many locals from the various towns they shot in played minor roles in the film. "They brought an exceptional characteristic to the film," Cimino said, "[they] had certain facial expressions. You couldn't create that in professional extras." For the deer-hunting sequences, Cimino had his crew assemble, paint and transport a prefabricated cabin up to the Cascade mountain range. He also specifically requested that wild deer be used, which they had to ship from a special game preserve in New Jersey. The Vietnam scenes were filmed on location in Thailand, on the River Kwai and near the Burmese border, and in Bangkok, where the conditions were arduous, doubling the film's initial budget of $8 million to $15 million. Once there, Cimino advised De Niro, Walken and Savage that they sleep in their uniforms and never take them off, wet or dry, for the entire month. Because of the unstable political situation in Thailand and the subject matter of the material, Cimino had been warned not to fly the processed footage back in. Cimino agreed not to see any dailies on the condition that "I am going to have every camera we have rolling all the time because there is no coming back here." As a result, the film took a whole three months just to view the footage that had been shot, and another three to edit it down. Cimino's chosen length came in at almost three and a half hours. Universal initially wanted to cut it down to two hours, so that more daily showings were possible. "If we had done that," said Cimino, "We would have lost important things. The first places people attack are those scenes that involve character development. A film lives, becomes alive, because of its shadows, its spaces, and that's what people wanted to cut." Despite its grim subject matter, The Deer Hunter performed well when it opened in December 1978, but quickly aroused controversy, particular for the film's depiction of Russian roulette, which the characters were forced to play when captured by the Viet Cong. Even though he had never intended the film to be political (himself referring to it as a story of what happens to ordinary people when they experience tragedy), some critics felt that Cimino was making a "right-wing statement", particularly with the film's ending. Nevertheless, the film became a massive critical and commercial success, winning five Oscars, including Best Picture and Best Director for Cimino.

The day after the Academy Awards, Cimino flew up to Kalispell, Montana to begin shooting his Western epic Heaven's Gate, which had been in pre-production for several months, finding locations, casting five hundred extras and building complicated sets. Joann Carelli, who had been a production consultant on The Deer Hunter, was the sole producer of the film, despite no longer having a romantic relationship with Cimino. An ambitious take on the American Western genre, the film follows a Harvard graduate who becomes a federal marshal investigating a Government-sanctioned plot to steal land from European settlers in Casper, Wyoming. The origins of the project dated back to a script Cimino had written earlier in the '70s titled The Johnson County War, based on a rare bit of history he stumbled across when researching the development of barbed wire and its use in the American West. At that time, his script was shelved due to its failure to attract big-name talent, such as John Wayne, who turned down the lead role. Later, in 1978, after a print of The Deer Hunter was screened for the head of production at United Artists, they offered Cimino a two-picture deal. What he wanted to do was The Fountainhead, but UA showed disinterest. Instead, he resurrected his screenplay for The Johnson County War, which he promptly rewrote before it went into production in April 1979 with an assembled cast of Kris Kristofferson, Isabelle Huppert and Christopher Walken. Cimino gave UA the initial budget estimation of $7.8 million, even though the period detail required for the film was astronomical. To authentically re-create the period, Cimino built an entire boomtown on the Montana location and transported a working steam locomotive from a Denver museum. He also had less time to prepare the film, since it was given a shorter pre-production period by United Artists to qualify for the December Oscar nomination deadline. Because each setup took such a long time to prepare, by the sixth day of filming the film was five days behind schedule. As with The Deer Hunter, Cimino was famously demanding of his cast and crew, including cinematographer Vilmos Zsigmond, whom he had liked working with before because of his "obstinacy" on set. Second assistant director Michael Stevenson since admitted that Cimino "lost his temper sometimes when people tried to interfere," but that the cast loved working with him "because Michael treated them with respect." When they weren't performing, the actors would take lessons on how to ride a horse, how to practice their characters' trades and how to dance. Even the extras used in the film were all considered with great detail; carefully chosen, dressed and even redressed if Cimino felt it wasn't right. They were also classified into specific groups of immigrants and merchants. "The idea," explained Cimino, "is that you must be able to look at any part of that immense screen and isolate from it any small piece according to your choice." Music arranger David Mansfield noted that the film's immigrant settlers were constantly filling out the background of crowd scenes. "Some bit character might be in the background while the lead actor is in the foreground. So you always see everybody in the community constantly, become familiar with them over the course of the picture." UA nearly ended up firing Cimino as the production budget continued to increase, with Norman Jewison or David Lean in mind to replace him. Ironically, a few years later, Cimino would be the first director approached to take over for Lean on the out-of-control production of The Bounty. Cimino, however, was intent on "painstakingly constructing his film according to photographs from the time" and immersing the audience into the world created in the film:

"I wanted you to feel what it was like to walk down a street in that period: to follow those noisy wagons, to cross all that activity, what you felt, what you heard. People made so much dust; my God, was it dusty! That makes the streets dirty... when hundreds of wagons go around, they raise dust. And very often, we took the time to record the background sound. In the store, for example, we recorded numerous conversations, with the intention of inserting them into the soundtrack later. This isn't general background noise; you hear people, in a corner, argue over the price of a knife, discuss the merits of a particular rifle... each of those people are engaged in a very specific activity and you hear them."

Shooting in Kalispell officially completed in October. By that point, $36 million was spent on the production. Cimino and Carelli then worked out a post-production schedule that would involve him delivering a film of three hours on May 1, 1980.

=== 1980s ===
One must love a place to be able to show grand landscapes on the screen. Nobody showed and made one feel Monument Valley like [John] Ford, although many tried. But him, he loved it, and if he was there and one could pose the question, "Why?", I am certain that he couldn't articulate a response, except to say that he deeply loved that place. When one loves a place, it shows in the images one makes.

— Michael Cimino

After editing the footage shot in Montana, filming for the Heaven's Gate prologue and epilogue began in March 1980. A rough edit of the film ended up screening for United Artists in June, running over five hours long. On November 18, Heaven's Gate had its world premiere in New York City. "I remember going to the New York premiere," said Jeff Bridges, one of the film's stars. "I'm not sure he [Cimino] had seen the movie complete; he was scrambling to put it together." In the 219-minute version that was shown, sound-editing problems in critical scenes made the plot hard for audiences to follow, and Cimino and cinematographer Vilmos Zsigmond tinted the film "with a kind of yellow glow" that was supposed to give an antique look, removed in the 2012 restoration. "Afterward, we heard that terrible stuttering applause," said Bridges, "and it was that sinking feeling. We tried to tell ourselves, 'Well, maybe they liked it so much that they are stunned into silence.' " The reviews were devastating. Before the film opened in Los Angeles, Cimino asked for it to be withdrawn and re-edited. In 1981, a shorter version was released, with added narration. A new poster campaign and a submission into the Cannes Film Festival slate did little to make a dent in financial losses. The failure of the film was also blamed for the collapse of United Artists, which was then sold by the Transamerica Corporation, having lost confidence in the company and its management. As a result, UA executive Steven Bach wrote an entire book devoted to the topic, Final Cut: Art, Money, and Ego in the Making of Heaven's Gate, the Film That Sank United Artists. Cimino referred to the book as "work of fiction" by a "degenerate who never even came on the set." Bach retorted when he told a reporter he didn't resent Cimino or wish the movie ill: "It would be like wishing ill of a corpse." With its scathing reviews and financial loss, Heaven's Gate quickly became a Hollywood legend.

Cimino intended to follow up Heaven's Gate with Conquering Horse through his two-picture deal with United Artists, but was never realized after its failure. The film, based on the Western novel written by Frederick Manfred, would have been a generational saga set in pre-white America that dealt with a young Sioux boy's rite of passage. "It's a story of the American Plains," said Cimino in 1982, "[taking] place in the Dakotas and Montana." Also at this time, Cimino had been attached as the director of The King of Comedy, which he withdrew from when Heaven's Gate was green lit, but vowed to return to once production ended. The film was first reported in 1979 as a Joann Carelli production, with Buck Henry making revisions to the script. However, by 1981, Martin Scorsese had already entered negotiations to direct. According to Cimino, in his version he would have cast Andy Kaufman in the lead role as Rupert Pupkin. "I shot videotape of Andy for weeks," he said. His version was to have also starred Meryl Streep and Orson Welles.

Following Heaven's Gate, Joann Carelli quickly landed him a picture deal at CBS Theatrical Films to direct Nitty Gritty, described by The New York Times as "a black comedy about news reporting". The film was scheduled to be released in 1982, alongside a slate of films including Table for Five, however, Cimino's never went into production, just as with several of the other reported projects. It was later listed as a lost project of Cimino's by the Los Angeles Times, who reported that it had been retitled Live on Tape prior to being dropped by CBS. He also allegedly proposed his Frank Costello biopic, then retitled Proud Dreamer, to CBS with Robert De Niro in mind to star, but his script was rejected due to the project's budget.

In early September 1982, Cimino approached short story writer Raymond Carver and his wife Tess Gallagher (both fans of Heaven's Gate) to rework a screenplay based on the life of Fyodor Dostoevsky, in hopes that he would direct it. According to Carver, Cimino presented him an existing screenplay commissioned by the veteran Italian film producer Carlo Ponti. The first draft had been written by Russian novelist Aleksandr Solzhenitsyn, and then translated to English by two Italian writers. Heavily researched, and taking Dostoevsky's near-execution as the film's focal point, Carver and Gallagher opted to rewrite the entire script, delivering a 220-page draft to Cimino in November. Cimino was impressed with the results, but Ponti returned to Europe shortly thereafter, halting further development. Fragments were later published in 1985, by Capra Press.

It will always be people who will interest me, I believe. It's people who give you the urge to make movies, characters. You have an attraction to a character, if he's interesting enough, that's what's important. I don't see myself making a film because it's from a certain genre, except a musical comedy, I would love to make a musical comedy. It provides a special pleasure which tempts me.

— Michael Cimino

In December 1982, after being unable to finalize a deal with director Herbert Ross at the time, Paramount Pictures offered the job of directing Footloose to Cimino. Producer Daniel Melnick warned him that if the film went over its budget of $7.5 million, Cimino would have to cover the expenses himself and he agreed. Cimino's proposed reimagination of the film, "a John Steinbeck inspired musical-comedy" set during the Great Depression, was to have followed a rich girl from Houston who falls in love with a dancer from a shanty town. Working from Dean Pitchford's original script, Cimino was at the helm of the film for several months, making more and more extravagant demands in terms of set construction and overall production. Just when the film was to begin shooting, he asked Melnick to let him rewrite the screenplay for an additional $250,000 and to delay the start date. Melnick fired him, and Herbert Ross directed Footloose instead. According to Melnick, "It might have been a good film [if Cimino had directed], but it wasn't the film we wanted to make. It wasn't the film we came to the party with." Craig Zadan, one of the film's producers, also stated, "Cimino wanted to make a darker film. We wanted to make entertainment."

Several other unproduced projects followed, including a collaboration with Steven Spielberg and Gary David Goldberg on a script titled Reel to Reel, which he was going to direct for Columbia Pictures, and a second collaboration with Raymond Carver on a film which they gave the elliptical title of Purple Lake. The latter of the two was written partly from a CBS documentary found by Joann Carelli called VisionQuest which was the name of an unorthodox social program to rehabilitate delinquent teenagers by sending them on a wagon train across the Rockies. Cimino also apparently tried to revive his Fountainhead adaptation again, even attracting the interest of Barbra Streisand for the role of Dominique Francon.

In August 1983, after Ronald F. Maxwell was dismissed as the director of The Pope of Greenwich Village, Cimino was named as a possible replacement. Cimino wanted to finesse its screenplay with some rewriting and restructuring, which would have taken beyond the mandated start date for shooting. Instead, as a favor to the producers who were on a deadline, Cimino generously went over his copious notes written on the script with the new director they hired, Stuart Rosenberg. According to MGM president Freddie Fields, Cimino's contributions to the film were invaluable; "He's been a terrific consultant."

In the summer of 1984, an old project Cimino had been attached to finally seemed to be moving toward production. The film was The Yellow Jersey, based upon a novel by Ralph Hurne about an aging, woman-chasing professional cyclist who nearly wins the Tour de France. The rights had been optioned back in 1973 by film producer Gary Mehlman, who then made a development deal with Columbia Pictures. In 1975, Cimino had been brought on board to direct the film and visited the Tour for the first time, for research. Over the next decade, the film generated expenses of nearly $2 million, and been in development with four studios and several independent production companies. Then, when Dustin Hoffman indicated an interest in starring in it, Mehlman took it back to Columbia in 1983. With Hoffman coming off the success of Columbia's Tootsie, "the film would have gone [into production] the moment he was ready," said Mehlman. By then, Colin Welland and Carl Foreman were brought aboard as scriptwriters, as well as Danish filmmaker Jørgen Leth (who had made the 1976 bicycle-racing documentary A Sunday in Hell), as Hoffman's research adviser. Cimino said that production was long controlled by Foreman, who died in June 1984. The following month, Mehlman, Leth, Cimino, Welland and Hoffman went to France for the Tour, for yet more research. Shooting with the Tour de France was initially scheduled for 1980 and nearly every year since. Welland was still working on the script and hoped to have a draft by October of that year. It has been rumored that Hoffman fired Cimino from the production, although multiple sources claim that the deal simply "fell apart with Cimino". After he exited, none of the replacement directors that Mehlman or the studio suggested were satisfactory to Hoffman, so he too left and the film continued to sink further into development hell.

After working on a script about the role of Chinese immigrants in the construction of the first transcontinental railroad in the American West, Cimino finally accepted Dino De Laurentiis' offer to adapt Robert Daley's novel Year of the Dragon into a feature film, due to similarities in subject matter. Cimino accepted under the conditions that the book be nothing more than a point of departure, that he keep the freedom to tell the story his way and to change characters, and De Laurentiis agreed. Since the project already had a set start date for shooting, Cimino enlisted the help of Oliver Stone in writing the screenplay. The two apparently did over a year of research for the film, frequenting several Chinatown nightclubs and bars each night "to insinuate ourselves into their life." "With Michael, it's a 24-hour day," Stone later said of working with Cimino. "He doesn't really sleep... he's truly an obsessive personality. He's the most Napoleonic director I ever worked with." At this time, Cimino was simultaneously doing extensive work for the production of The Yellow Jersey. Several actors were considered for the lead role of Stanley White, including Jeff Bridges, Christopher Walken and Nick Nolte. Cimino eventually settled on Mickey Rourke after collaborating with him briefly on the production of The Pope of Greenwich Village, as well as Heaven's Gate several years prior. "Mickey is a true original," Cimino said of Rourke, "He's like a slugger, a battler... Mickey's like Joe Frazier and John [Lone] is like Ali." Cimino took note of the design of other Chinatowns throughout the world, and used the research to replicate New York's Chinatown and Mott Street for a detailed backlot which was constructed in Wilmington, North Carolina. Since its construction, the set for the film has been re-used extensively for other Hollywood film productions. The street was re-created in such extraordinary detail that even Stanley Kubrick (who was born in the Bronx), thought it had been the real Chinatown. Cimino, who often liked to shoot interiors in one city and exteriors in another, also filmed parts in New York City, Toronto, Vancouver, Bangkok, Thailand and Chiang Rai. Confident that he'd deliver on time and within budget, Cimino had a wager going with De Laurentiis that if he didn't go over budget, he would get the luxurious Mercedes that John Lone's character drove in the film. If not, Cimino would forfeit $50,000 of his salary. "It was four days over schedule, but $130,000 under-budget," said production manager Randolph Cheveldave, so Cimino collected. Upon its release, Year of the Dragon was sharply criticized for what many saw as offensively stereotypical depictions of Chinese Americans, but still managed to turn a profit at the box office. Afterwards, De Laurentiis signed a picture deal for Cimino to direct a film adaptation of the Truman Capote novella, "Handcarved Coffins". De Laurentiis had planned to release the film in 1986 following his purchase of Embassy Pictures.

In 1986, Cimino accepted the deal to direct the adaptation of the best-selling Mario Puzo novel The Sicilian, after Dino De Laurentiis cancelled the production of Hand Carved Coffins. The Sicilian had been offered previously to directors Francis Ford Coppola, Martin Scorsese and Brian De Palma, who all declined. At the time Cimino boarded the project, it initially had Michael Corleone set up as a character, but due to rights issues, all Godfather references were removed. There had already been a screenplay by Steve Shagan, but since Cimino felt the film needed more "political bite", he brought aboard novelist Gore Vidal to help rewrite the script. Around 80 pages of material were added to Shagan's initial draft, either by Cimino himself or Vidal, who later sued the Writers Guild for receiving no credit. According to film critic F. X. Feeney, Cimino's first casting choice for Salvatore Giuliano was Daniel Day-Lewis, but since he was relatively unknown at the time, the producers suggested Christopher Lambert, whom Cimino accepted because his name guaranteed financing. During production, Cimino worked closely with Umberto Tirelli (a frequent collaborator of Luchino Visconti's, whom Cimino admired) on the period wardrobe required for the film. Cimino had specifically requested that he work with him directly during the fitting, much to Tirelli's chagrin, who exclaimed in rage, "Goddamn it! I promised myself when Luchino died that I would never work this hard again!" Cimino said this was the best backhanded compliment he ever received in his career. Filming began in Sicily that July, shot extensively in the capital city of Palermo as well as in the mountains of western Sicily. Soon after production ended in September, Cimino turned in his cut of the film, which ran over the agreed runtime of 105–125 minutes stipulated in his contractual obligation. When Gladden tried to re-edit the film, Cimino filed a lawsuit to stop them. Cimino's contract granted him final cut privilege as well as two test screenings of his longer version, which he was never given. Cimino lost, and the film was released a year later, in October. When released in 1987, the film did poorly, but received some critical acclaim, notably by F. X. Feeney, who saw Cimino's director's cut, released only in France.

In 1987, before the release of The Sicilian, Cimino began work on an epic saga chronicling the life of the Irish patriot Michael Collins, based on a screenplay by Eoghan Harris. After disagreements with Harris over Collins as a character, his draft was heavily rewritten by Cimino with the assistance of Robert Bolt, which the two developed in London. Their script, now titled Blest Souls, was described by the Los Angeles Times as "a love story set against the backdrop of the Irish rebellion". Joann Carelli assisted with casting for the project; finding Sean Bean and Tilda Swinton for the leads. Cimino started scouting for locations in Edinburgh, Liverpool and in Ireland. While there, him and his team of production managers sought permission from the Irish Government to use their army for the production, which they got. Bono and Bob Geldof were also signed on to compose the music. The film was backed by Nelson Entertainment and would have re-teamed Cimino with his Deer Hunter co-producer Barry Spikings. David Puttnam of Columbia Pictures reportedly gave Cimino the green light to begin shooting; however, the project became a casualty of The Coca-Cola Company pulling out of Columbia. Instead, an unrelated script by Neil Jordan was made into a film in 1996 that starred Liam Neeson as Collins. Bolt later admitted he didn't know what came of the project or their script: "Yes, [Cimino] fled back to America, and all of a sudden, that was that. I don't know what happened."

Less than three weeks after the Collins biopic was cancelled, Cimino started pre-production work on Santa Ana Wind, a contemporary romantic drama set in L.A. offered to him by Barry Spikings. Budgeted at roughly $15 million, the set start date for shooting was early December 1987. The screenplay was written by Floyd Mutrux and the film was to be bankrolled again by Nelson Entertainment. Cimino's representative added that the film was "about the San Fernando Valley and the friendship between two guys" and "more intimate" than Cimino's previous big-budget work like Heaven's Gate and the then unreleased The Sicilian. However, Nelson Holdings International Ltd. cancelled the project after disclosing that its banks, including Security Pacific National Bank, had reduced the company's borrowing power after Nelson failed to meet certain financial requirements in its loan agreements. A spokesman for Nelson said the cancellation occurred "in the normal course of business," but declined to elaborate. The film, also intended for distribution by Columbia, did not feature any major stars.

Cimino finished out his picture deal with Dino De Laurentiis in 1989 when Mickey Rourke suggested he direct the remake of the 1955 home invasion thriller The Desperate Hours. The film had been in preparation for several years with directors Christopher Cain and William Friedkin attached at different points. Rourke only agreed to do the film if Cimino would direct it due to his ability to transcend the material, "Michael's one of the few directors able to elevate beyond what an actor's capable of doing." Since Alex Thomson was unavailable, Cimino enlisted the services of rookie cinematographer Doug Milsome, whom he got to know through Stanley Kubrick. While shot on 35 mm film, Desperate Hours is the first of Cimino's works not to be photographed in his preferred Anamorphic aspect ratio. Principal photography began in October 1989 at Trout Lake near Telluride, Colorado. From there, the production moved to Salt Lake City. Like many of Cimino's works, the film was shot in a variety of locations, mainly in Utah. Although Cimino was allegedly shooting from his own separate script, Writers Guild arbitration established that since the first draft by Lawrence Konner and Mark Rosenthal (along with the original author Joseph Hayes), was the one Cimino agreed to, his name was removed from the credit. The interior house from the film, which was also designed by Cimino, was built at the Ventura Entertainment Center in Orem, Utah, with fully constructed rooms in order to create a look and feel of claustrophobia. It was also designed "with complete fluidity of movement, in any direction" featuring hidden compartments and passages so that the camera could be placed anywhere throughout the house. According to Cimino, co-star Anthony Hopkins would often get angered by Rourke's unprepared habits and improvisations on set: "Mickey's been shot in the head with Brando. This whole 'I don't have to know my fucking lines' thing. Tony Hopkins wanted to kill him." Filming wrapped that December, five days ahead of the schedule. De Laurentiis took a two-page ad in The Hollywood Reporter congratulating Cimino for finishing on time and within budget, dubbing the film "a picture of shattering importance." After poor previews however, De Laurentiis apparently edited out several scenes, including an intense, eight-minute confrontation between Lindsay Crouse and Kelly Lynch in "a huge, empty football field" because test audiences "read lesbian overtones" into their relationship. Cimino's original cut apparently lasted over two and half hours. The only known evidence of additional footage are from a few stills, which seemingly show a few of them.

=== 1990s ===
In 1991, Cimino participated in that year's Avoriaz Fantasy Film Festival, where he served as jury president and awarded director John Harrison with the Grand Prix for his film Tales from the Darkside: The Movie.

Following the poor reception of Desperate Hours, Cimino wrote an original screenplay called Heaven Is a Sometime Thing which he began submitting to studios circa 1992. It was conceived with Joann Carelli and told the story of a New Mexico mine-worker named C.J. who becomes a brilliant golfer and is estranged from his working-class waitress girlfriend when he meets an heiress and is taken up by high society. F. X. Feeney, who helped him with the script, compared it to the triangle of Montgomery Clift, Shelley Winters and Elizabeth Taylor in A Place in the Sun. The Washington Post reported that Cimino had developed the project at Paramount. He later resurrected the script and was able to publish it in France as a short novel.

Taking on "writer-for-hire work" in Hollywood, Cimino wrote an adapted script for Clint Eastwood's Malpaso Productions from the 1993 novel Paradise Junction, which Eastwood would have either directed/starred in. He was also writing a script for filmmaker John Woo based on his story titled Full Circle, which Woo claimed would "have a similar style to The Killer."

In the mid-90s, Oliver Stone encouraged producer Mario Kassar to help fund Cimino's ambitious Conquering Horse project. However, as Stone recalled, "He [Cimino] was too difficult to deal with. He was arrogant, and I don't know that he ever gave it up. He never could eat humble pie or didn't seem to."

There is nowhere in the world that you go that is not interesting, and my approach is to insinuate myself into the culture as much as I can. That's why, sometimes, it's hard for me to remember certain things because when I'm doing gangs in L.A., I'm really into the gang culture. I mean, I got to where I could read graffiti on the walls. I would go to rap clubs, and I mean, that's all that would be on [in] my car is rap music. And I'd drench myself in the culture, and it's hard to un-drench yourself. And just as you're doing that, you're inserting yourself into yet again a new culture.

— Michael Cimino

In 1995, Cimino was approached by Regency producer Arnon Milchan to helm The Sunchaser, which would ultimately become Cimino's last feature-length film. A spiritual road odyssey, the film stars Woody Harrelson as a Los Angeles doctor who is held at gunpoint by a teenage convict dying of abdominal cancer (played by Jon Seda), and forced to drive into Navajo Country in search of a sacred mountain lake with healing powers. The script by Charles Leavitt (which had been offered previously to Diane Keaton and Mel Gibson), was virtually rewritten by Cimino. Incorporating elements of his unproduced screenplays for both Conquering Horse and Purple Lake into it, the film had a personal resonance to Cimino; "When I was very young, I was lucky enough to spend some time... with the tribe of the Dakota Indians," he said. "I immersed myself so heavily in their culture that, in a way, it became my religion—a religion based on a very simple idea: a stone, a cloud, a rock, everything has spirit, is life. Sunchaser allowed me to return to this." Jack Nitzsche was the original composer but Cimino fired him after the two didn't get on well. Instead, he hired Maurice Jarre, who orchestrated a bombastic, old-school score. The Sunchaser made its debut at the 1996 Cannes Film Festival, where it screened in competition for the Palme d'Or. However, unsupported by its distributor, the film was released theatrically only in a few theaters in the southwest, where it played for a week, grossing roughly $30,000 on a budget of $31 million."

Cimino was to follow the film up with An American Dream in 1997, about the first Asian immigrant to join Al Capone's mob. Jason Scott Lee was attached to star and The Hollywood Reporter indicated that the film was to shoot in Chicago, San Francisco and South Korea. That same year, Cimino was reported to direct The Dreaming Place for Trimark Pictures. Originally titled Law of the Jungle, Variety reported that the film, which was in the early stages of development, was to be a male vigilante story along the lines of Paramount's Eye for an Eye. Rodney Patrick Vaccaro wrote the screenplay under the supervision of Cimino, and Jonathon Komack Martin was to executive produce the film. The planned budget was not revealed, however, it was Trimark's attempt to make a bigger-budgeted film than usual which is ultimately why it was never produced. According to Vaccaro, he and Cimino apparently collaborated on two projects in total together over a period of four years.

In July 1997, Cimino served as president of the international competition jury at the 42nd annual Taormina Film Fest.

As early as 1997, Cimino was attached as the director of a film called Brasil 1500, planned to debut in the United States under the title Gonçalo, after the main character. Variety magazine incorrectly referred to the film's title as 1500. This Brazilian-American co-production intended to portray the events of the day of the arrival of Pedro Álvares Cabral's flagship in Santa Cruz Cabrália on April 21, 1500. Written by first-time Brazilian scribe Fábio Fonseca, the film was to have been told through the eyes of a fictional character (similarly to Titanic), named Gonçalo, a Portuguese sailor from Cabral's fleet. Antonio Banderas was eyed as a possible star, with a supporting cast planned to be composed largely of Brazilian natives. Cimino and producer Ilya Salkind were also interested in casting several British actors for the project, chief among them being Paul Scofield. A budget of $35 million was estimated, with principal photography initially set for January and February 1998. Filming was then pushed back to early 1999, for a planned release in 2000, coinciding with the 500th anniversary of the discovery of Brazil. That year, Cimino was in Brazil to choose sets and scout locations, which included Porto Seguro and Portugal. For research, he read the famous epic poem Os Lusíadas, about the discovery of a sea route to India. Speaking at a press conference in Lisbon, Cimino said that unlike the films made about Christopher Columbus' discovery of the Americas, this film would follow a young man as its protagonist, "in a story very similar to that of Lawrence of Arabia," he said. He also claimed that an exact replica of Cabral's flagship had been constructed for the production. The film was not made due to producers Ilya Salkind and Jane Chaplin's failure to secure a deal with an international investor.

=== 2000s ===
After Gonçalo was rejected by Warner Bros., Paramount and Disney, Cimino began to work on writing his first novel, titled Big Jane. Set in 1951, and 173 pages in length, the story follows a "dynamite-looking, six-foot blonde who wears blue jeans, a Miss Universe of muscle," who travels by motorcycle across America and ends up fighting in the Korean War alongside a brigade of women. Initially conceived as a screenplay, Big Jane was meticulously translated from English to French and published on September 5, 2001, by publishing house Éditions Gallimard. Cimino later tried seeking interest from U.S. publishers, to no avail. He first appeared with the screenplay treatment (written in prose at novel length), at that year's Venice Film Festival, where he conducted a staged reading from the piece and proclaimed that the next time he would return with a film made from the story. Cimino was then honored at Deauville, where he received the Prix littéraire Lucien-Barrière, an award that previously went to Norman Mailer and Gore Vidal. "Oh, I'm the happiest, I think, I've ever been!" he said in response.

In September 2001, it was reported that Cimino would return to the director's chair to make Man's Fate, a 3-hour epic set against the backdrop of the Chinese Communist Revolution. Based on French author André Malraux's 1933 novel, the film, as described by Cimino, was to have depicted "the deep, emotional bonds that develop between several Europeans living in Shanghai during the tragic turmoil that characterized the onset of China's Communist regime." The roughly $25 million project was to have been shot wholly on location in Shanghai in June of the following year and would have benefited from the support of China's government, which said it would provide $2 million worth of local labor costs. The film's producer, Mirko Ikonomoff was in early talks to pre-sell Man's Fate to several European groups, including Italy's RAI and France's TF1, but failed in his attempts. Actors Johnny Depp, Daniel Day-Lewis, John Malkovich and Alain Delon were all in negotiations as possible stars for the project, as well as Uma Thurman or Nicole Kidman as the female lead. After failing to raise money elsewhere, Cimino took his script to Martha De Laurentiis who passed on it. "If you edit it down, it could be a very tight, beautiful, sensational movie," De Laurentiis said, "but violent, and ultimately a subject matter that I don't think America is that interested in." Cimino however, felt differently, "There was never a better time to try to do Man's Fate," he said, "because Man's Fate is what it's all about right now. It's about the nature of love, of friendship, the nature of honor and dignity. How fragile and important all of those things are in a time of crisis." In a March 2002 interview for Vanity Fair, Cimino called the screenplay "the best one I've ever done," adding that he had "half the money; [we're] trying to raise the other half." Up until his death, Cimino tried to get the film off the ground several times, struggling to secure financing. In what would be his last interview in March 2015, Cimino had said he still hoped to make the film someday.

Cimino was attached to produce the independent film The Silk Curtain about Empress Dowager Cixi, who ruled China for 47 years until 1908. Consulina Wong was to have directed from her own screenplay, and was to have starred as Cixi. Jason Scott Lee was also considered for a role. Cimino said he was drawn to The Silk Curtain by the strength of the characters and "the intimate story about their relationships played out against one of the most tumultuous periods in China's history." The film was to have been produced by COJODA Productions, and a private reading was held at the Kumu Kahua Theatre in Honolulu in 2002, but the project failed to pique interest from potential investors.

In 2003, Cimino published his second novel, a two-volume work; the first a partially fictitious memoir called Conversations en miroir (English translation: Shadow Conversations) which he co-authored with Francesca Pollock, and the other a short story called A Hundred Oceans. The latter of the two Cimino adapted from his pre-existing feature-length screenplay Heaven Is a Sometime Thing. Neither this, nor his first novel Big Jane were released in the states. Cimino has mentioned in interviews that he wrote a third book called Sailing to Byzantium (named after the poem by W. B. Yeats), about a dying tycoon who reflects on his life. He began writing it as early as 1997, and it still to this day, remains unpublished. He apparently sent an early draft of the novel to a friend, requesting later that they burn their copy: "I want to hear every page going into the incinerator." Also at this period, Cimino began to compose original music in his spare time.

I can't write without placing my characters in space, I need to see in three dimensions inside my head, to have a three-dimensional space. I don't make flat movies. I don't work in a two-dimensional plane, I want to take down the wall of the screen, to bring the public inside the story and the adventure, through their eyes. I need to pre-imagine the film's architecture, the film's space, even the space of the room to create my characters. I need to see before I can write, and if I can't see I can't write. In other words, it has to be real and three-dimensional inside my head before I can put it on paper.

— Michael Cimino

In 2004, after Terrence Malick exited as director of the Che Guevara biopic, Cimino apparently pitched himself to direct it. Steven Soderbergh was eventually chosen as the film's director.

In 2007, Cimino was asked by Cannes director Thierry Frémaux to contribute a 3-minute short segment for the collective film To Each His Own Cinema, celebrating the 60th year of the Cannes Film Festival. The project consisted of 34 short films by 36 acclaimed directors. Representing five continents and 25 countries, the filmmakers were invited to express "their state of mind of the moment as inspired by the motion picture theatre". Cimino's segment depicts a cigar-smoking French filmmaker who films a Cuban pop star's music video in a movie theater. Later, when she is shown the footage, she is angered by his editing decisions and begins to strangle him. While spoken entirely in different languages, the film has no subtitles. But as its title, ("No Translation Needed") suggests, they are not necessary.

=== 2010s ===
In the early 2010s, French film producer Vincent Maraval worked on various projects with Cimino, none of which came to fruition. One film, an original screenplay by Cimino himself titled Cream Rises, followed the daily lives of two young female models, (whom Maraval compared to Paris Hilton and Nicole Richie) who are "completely disconnected from reality" and live a hedonistic life in Los Angeles filled with empty sex and boozing. Cimino wanted Taylor Swift to play one of the leads, but since she was unknown at the time, Maraval passed on it. Halfway through the film, the more timid of the two girls is murdered and the other heads to the countryside to find her uncle, "An old cowboy farmer with very Western values", whom Christopher Walken was to embody. "It was something very contemporary," Maraval explained, "About the world of today and its confrontation with the world of yesterday. As if the cinema of Cimino looked at the cinema of today. It was very moving." The script for Cream Rises was also read by the TV channel Arte, who were apparently "enthusiastic" about possibly investing.

Other projects Cimino worked on with Maraval later in his life include a feature adaptation of the Tennessee Williams short story "One Arm" as well as a film about the history of America from the point of view of the Native Americans.

At the persistence of Joann Carelli, Cimino meticulously supervised a restoration of Heaven's Gate frame-by-frame, for The Criterion Collection, where he restored the original film's color. Cimino said, while at first hesitant to revisit the film, that his instincts quickly took over:

"The minute I sat down at the editing console, something else in me took over, and my hands began to work. My brain began to work. And before I knew it, I was working on this restoration, which I swore I would not do... The more I worked on it, the more I became absolutely blown away by the commitment of people like Kris [Kristofferson], and Chris Walken, Isabelle Huppert, all the actors. The intensity that they brought to every moment that they were on film, and off film. I owe a great debt to them because they dedicated the better part of a year to this enterprise. And when we first showed it, of course, in New York, it was like we all got guillotined at the same time. And I was always especially upset at the fact that the actors' work was never recognized. You know, for some reason I was singled out."

In 2012, at the 69th Venice Film Festival, the restored director's cut was screened and was met with a standing ovation. The film was also shown at the New York Film Festival, a return to "the scene of the crime" said Cimino, where it received subsequent acclaim, even being dubbed by critics as a misunderstood masterpiece. Cimino was deeply moved by the positive reception at the film's re-release, "All of those years, I felt like Heaven's Gate was a beautiful, fantastically colored balloon tied to a string fastened to my wrist, so the balloon could never fly," he said.

In 2015, he was awarded the Leopard of Honour at the Locarno Film Festival, for his life's work achievement. After receiving the award, the following day Cimino took part in a discussion about his career in front of an audience in one of his last public appearances. When asked if he was working on another project, he replied, "Always. I never stop. If you stop, you die."

== Death and legacy ==
Cimino was confirmed dead on July 2, 2016, at age 77, at his home in Beverly Hills, California. No cause has been disclosed officially to the public. Since his death, many directors, actors, and other public figures paid tribute to him, including Robert De Niro, Thierry Frémaux, Edgar Wright, William Friedkin, Paul Rust, Christopher McQuarrie, Kelly Lynch, Jason Reitman, Mark Romanek, Jay Baruchel, Mark Harris and Sophie Marceau. Film critic F. X. Feeney, a close friend of Cimino's, wrote:

"A few weeks before his death, Michael consulted a physician about a mild respiratory complaint but otherwise suffered no signs of ill health. When I last had lunch with him on June 19th, he was full of energy and plans. Nevertheless, because he was an intuitive man, I feel certain looking back that he had an inkling his life was drawing to a close. He took deliberate care to mend fences with as many people as he could in the last year of his life, and with me that last day he was more reflective than I'd ever known him to be about his early life. He was full of amused memories centered on his dad's fierce perfectionism. Friends and loved ones found him impossible to reach after the 28th of June, and – when the police entered his house after several days – the officer who found him tucked in his bed described him as "peacefully deceased." His heart had apparently stopped without trauma, in sleep. There was no funeral or public memorial thereafter, and he needs none. His monuments are onscreen."

His work has been lauded by such filmmakers as Stanley Kubrick, Agnès Varda, Martin Scorsese, Francis Ford Coppola, Miloš Forman, Spike Lee, Guillermo del Toro, Eric Roth, Steven Spielberg, Mark Romanek, Olivier Assayas, Greta Gerwig, Steven Soderbergh, Brett Ratner, David Gordon Green, James Gray and Quentin Tarantino.

When asked to explain the commercial failure of his films following The Deer Hunter, Cimino reasoned:

"We need to approach the problem from the opposite angle. If The Deer Hunter was such a success, it's because Vietnam was front-page news at the time. No one could ignore what was happening there. From the illiterate to the intellectual, everyone was confronted with this war and knew at least someone who had been there. My other films didn't rely on such obvious facts: you had to know the history of immigration from Eastern Europe to the West, or the importance of the triads in Asian society, or the relationship between the Church, the Mafia, and the aristocracy in Sicily. And how a man like [Salvatore] Giuliano, the Sicilian, fit into all of that."

The director was the subject of the 2021 documentary Michael Cimino, un mirage américain, featuring audio recordings conducted by French critic Jean-Baptiste Thoret. Reflecting on the time he spent with him, Thoret said:

"I understood that [Cimino] had a terrible time inhabiting the present, the reality of the life of every day. Physically but also in his way of thinking: he was always elsewhere. Not in an ethereal or disconnected way. He was in a very precise past and therefore also a bit in a fantasy... he fantasized about a relationship with America, with John Ford."

Joann Carelli and her daughter Calantha Mansfield have been the proprietors of Cimino's legacy following his death. According to biographer Charles Elton (who published a book on the late director in 2022), Carelli currently resides in Europe where she spends her time looking for funding for films based on some of Cimino's unpublished writings.

== Other projects ==
At some point between the releases Thunderbolt and Lightfoot and The Deer Hunter, Cimino attempted to write an adaptation of Fyodor Dostoevsky's Crime and Punishment.

In the month before he gave the pitch for The Deer Hunter, Cimino was briefly attached to helm James A. Michener's adventure novel Caravans, set in contemporary Afghanistan. The film had spent roughly a decade in development before it was released.

In 1976, Cimino met Oliver Stone who offered him the chance to direct his script adaptation of Midnight Express (before the book had even been published), which he loved. Cimino declined however, as he was already doing extensive pre-production work for The Deer Hunter, but the two remained in touch and would collaborate on several other projects. A few years later, he met Stone again, who was optioning his screenplay for Born on the Fourth of July. Al Pacino was attached to star as Ron Kovic. At that time, Cimino was eager to make another film about Vietnam and the stories of returning veterans, even going as far as to offer to work for free. However, the producer, Martin Bregman, declined. The film was later resurrected in 1989, and directed by Stone himself.

It was rumored that Cimino had been in early discussions with producer Robert Stigwood to direct the adaptation of the musical Evita at EMI, after he had finished The Deer Hunter. However, following the disastrous reception of Heaven's Gate in New York and Hollywood, a spokesman with Stigwood claimed that Cimino had never been involved with Evita at any capacity and that they "planned to seek a retraction from Time magazine," which had listed him as the film's director.

Producer Dino De Laurentiis purchased the film rights to the horror novel The Dead Zone after Stanley Donen left the project as director, at Lorimar. De Laurentiis approached Cimino to direct, and was very briefly attached but author Stephen King pushed for him to be replaced after disagreements over the rewriting of the script when King attempted to adapt it himself.

For a period of time in 1984, Cimino agreed to produce Platoon for Oliver Stone, with Emilio Estevez attached at that time to star as Staff Sgt. Barnes. Stone then signed on to co-write Cimino's Year of the Dragon for Dino De Laurentiis under the condition that he would next finance Platoon as a result. Cimino moved on after the project fell through with De Laurentiis at MGM, and from there the script was passed to John Daly and released in 1986. According to Stone, it was Cimino who had encouraged him to bring back his script for the film when Stone had given up on it: "He said 'It's going to come back', and I'm glad he said that."

Around the same time he was doing Year of the Dragon for Dino De Laurentiis, Cimino had a deal to direct a biopic at Embassy Pictures based on the William Kennedy novel Legs. Mickey Rourke was attached to play the gangster Legs Diamond, and had told the Chicago Tribune in 1985 that, "One side's waiting for a rewrite, the other side's waiting for the money for a rewrite," but felt that it still would be made eventually. Leonard Termo was also attached to the project, as Diamond's bodyguard.

One of Cimino's hopes since first arriving in Hollywood was to helm a big-budget, old-fashioned Hollywood musical loosely inspired by the Porgy and Bess opera. In a 1985 interview for Cahiers du cinéma, Cimino said that he wanted to reimagine it as a romantic tale of a young, black Gospel-singing girl from the South (loosely based on Eva Jessye) who falls for a white Juilliard concert pianist (loosely based on George Gershwin). Together, the two struggle to stage a Broadway production of Porgy and Bess. In the same edition, Cimino discussed his love for the work of Ayn Rand, expressing interest in someday adapting her novel Atlas Shrugged for the screen, in addition to The Fountainhead.

== Influences and style ==
=== Influences ===
I'm much more intrigued by a good building than by a good movie. I'm much more interested in a big bridge or a great new novel or a great painting. When I'm asked about my influences, instead of rolling out 20 filmmakers, I say Frank Lloyd Wright, [Edgar] Degas... [Gustav] Mahler...

— Michael Cimino

[T]here were three great figures whe were inescapable: Kurosawa, Ford and Visconti. They cast such long shadows. Often one feels like a firefly in summer. You light up the shadows for a season and then disappear. But their work stands apart. All of them came from a time when directors were able to make many more movies. Now we have this tragic waste of time between projects.

— Michael Cimino

Cimino has shown great admiration for Luchino Visconti, John Ford and Akira Kurosawa, dubbing them "The Holy Trinity of movies." He has also praised the work of film director Vincente Minnelli and "his attention to detail, especially in the musicals." He once named his literary influences as Vladimir Nabokov, Alexander Pushkin, Leo Tolstoy, Gore Vidal, Raymond Carver, Cormac McCarthy, the classics of Islamic literature, Frank Norris and Steven Pinker. Cimino also said that he liked to begin research for a new film by reading that country's poets; Li Bo (China: Year of the Dragon) and W. B. Yeats (Ireland: Blest Souls).

In 1992, Cimino participated in the Sight & Sound film polls. Held every ten years to select the greatest films of all time, directors were asked to select ten films of their choice. Cimino's choices were:

- The Leopard (Italy, 1963)
- They Were Expendable (USA, 1945)
- Ludwig (Italy/France, 1973)
- The Searchers (USA, 1956)
- La Strada (Italy, 1954)
- Children of Paradise (France, 1945)
- My Darling Clementine (USA, 1946)
- La Dolce Vita (Italy, 1960)
- Rocco and His Brothers (Italy, 1960)
- Seven Samurai (Japan, 1954)

=== Themes and style ===
Cimino's films have been noted for their controversial subject matter and striking visual style. Elements of Cimino's visual sensibility include shooting in Anamorphic widescreen, painterly compositions, jittery tracking shots and wide vista establishing shots that emphasize the Earth's landscape and nature. Cimino's films are also slowly paced, focusing less on story and more on characters, allowing the viewer to observe their nuances and the setting. The subject matter in Cimino's films frequently focuses on aspects of U. S. history and culture, notably disillusionment over the American Dream. Other trademarks include love triangles between main characters, sudden bursts of violence in seemingly tranquil or naturalistic settings and the casting of non-professional actors in supporting roles.

=== Frequent collaborators ===
Frequent collaborators of Cimino's included actors Mickey Rourke, Christopher Walken, Jeff Bridges, Clint Eastwood, Geoffrey Lewis, Richard Bauer and Caroline Kava, writers Deric Washburn, Oliver Stone, Thomas McGrath, Rodney Patrick Vaccaro and Raymond Carver, producers Joann Carelli, Dino De Laurentiis and Barry Spikings, cinematographers Vilmos Zsigmond, Alex Thomson and Doug Milsome, composer David Mansfield, and assistant director Brian W. Cook.

== Public image ==
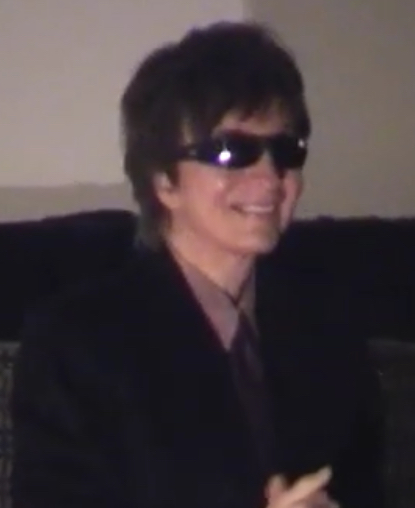
Cimino at the Cineteca di Bologna in 2003

Cimino developed a reputation for giving exaggerated stories about himself, his background, and his filmmaking experiences. "When I'm kidding, I'm serious, and when I'm serious, I'm kidding," said Cimino in a 2002 interview. "I am not who I am, and I am who I am not."

Following The Sunchaser, Cimino became more reclusive; spending the majority of the last two decades of his life retreating to his home in Beverly Hills where he wrote incessantly: "Books and screenplays. Sometimes songs." He even claimed he kept track of how many pages he wrote day-to-day, "One page one day, five the next. Sometimes zero. Those are the hard days because you still have to get your butt in the chair and keep writing." Cimino's agent, Mike Wise, called him "the Howard Hughes of Hollywood."

Due to his reclusive habits and fluctuations in his physical appearance, many rumors circulated about Cimino over the course of his life, with several claiming he had dressed in drag, gotten plastic surgery, or even undergone a sex change. Beginning in 1997, a columnist with Variety magazine devoted an item to dispelling unspecified "reports" that he had changed his name to "Michelle" and his gender via surgery. Cimino explained that he had not had nor intended to have a sex change and that he was not a cross-dresser, suspecting a former girlfriend of his to have started the rumors. His change in appearance was attributed to weight fluctuations, saying in 2002 that he'd gained weight while editing The Sunchaser: "They're always ordering food. You're in [the editing room] for twenty hours a day, seven days a week, getting no sleep." With the help of Sunchaser star Woody Harrelson, Cimino began fasting and lost roughly eighty pounds: "He had me on fat-free foods, yoga, etcetera... I am now back to my college wrestling weight," said Cimino.

== Filmography ==
=== Film ===
Year	Title	Director	Writer	Producer	Notes
1974	Thunderbolt and Lightfoot	Yes	Yes	No	
1978	The Deer Hunter	Yes	Yes	Yes	Co-written with Deric Washburn
1980	Heaven's Gate	Yes	Yes	No	
1985	Year of the Dragon	Yes	Yes	No	Co-written with Oliver Stone
1987	The Sicilian	Yes	Uncredited	Yes	Script revisions
1990	Desperate Hours	Yes	Uncredited	Yes	Script revisions
1996	The Sunchaser	Yes	Uncredited	Yes	Script revisions
2007	To Each His Own Cinema	Partial	Partial	No	Segment: "No Translation Needed"

Writer only

Year	Title	Notes
1972	Silent Running	Co-written with Deric Washburn and Steven Bochco
1973	Magnum Force	Co-written with John Milius
1976	The Outlaw Josey Wales	Uncredited; Script revisions with Philip Kaufman
1979	The Rose	Originally written as Pearl in 1974; Uncredited; co-written with Bo Goldman and Marvin Worth
1980	The Dogs of War	Initially slated to direct Uncredited draft later rewritten by Gary DeVore and George Malko

=== Known commercials ===
- 1965: "Come Alive!" for Pepsi
- 1967: "Take Me Along" for United Airlines
- 1967: "Yesterdays" for Eastman Kodak
- 1968: "I Am the Soft Drink Expert" for Canada Dry
- 1969: "The Coffee Moment" for Maxwell House

== Awards and nominations ==
Year	Award	Category	Film	Result
1978	Los Angeles Film Critics Association Award	Best Director	The Deer Hunter	Won
1979	Golden Globe Award	Best Motion Picture – Drama	The Deer Hunter	Nominated
1979	Golden Globe Award	Best Director	The Deer Hunter	Won
1979	Golden Globe Award	Best Screenplay	The Deer Hunter	Nominated
1979	Directors Guild of America Award	Outstanding Achievement in Feature Film	The Deer Hunter	Won
1979	Academy Award	Best Picture	The Deer Hunter	Won
1979	Academy Award	Best Director	The Deer Hunter	Won
1979	Academy Award	Best Original Screenplay	The Deer Hunter	Nominated
1981	Cannes Film Festival	Palme d'Or	Heaven's Gate	Nominated
1982	Golden Raspberry Award	Worst Director	Heaven's Gate	Won
1986	César Award	Best Foreign Film	Year of the Dragon	Nominated
1986	Golden Raspberry Award	Worst Director	Year of the Dragon	Nominated
1986	Golden Raspberry Award	Worst Screenplay	Year of the Dragon	Nominated
1996	Cannes Film Festival	Palme d'Or	The Sunchaser	Nominated
2012	Venice Film Festival	Persol Tribute to Visionary Talent		Won
2015	Locarno International Film Festival	Leopard of Honour		Won

Directed Academy Award performances
Under Cimino's direction, these actors have received Academy Award nominations (and one win) for their performances in their respective roles.

Year	Performer	Film	Result
Academy Award for Best Actor
1978	Robert De Niro	The Deer Hunter	Nominated
Academy Award for Best Supporting Actor
1974	Jeff Bridges	Thunderbolt and Lightfoot	Nominated
1978	Christopher Walken	The Deer Hunter	Won
Academy Award for Best Supporting Actress
1978	Meryl Streep	The Deer Hunter	Nominated

Honors

- Honorary Colonel, Royal Thai Air Force, Thailand (1984)

== Bibliography ==
- 2001: Big Jane. Paris: Gallimard. ISBN 978-2070417605.
- 2003: Conversations en miroir. Co-authored with Francesca Pollock. Paris: Gallimard. ISBN 978-2070313150.
- 2006: Byzantium (unpublished)

== Sources ==
- Heard, Christopher (2006). Mickey Rourke: High and Low. London, England: Plexus Publishing Ltd. ISBN 978-0-85965-386-2.
- Medved, Harry; Medved, Michael (1984). The Hollywood Hall of Shame: The Most Expensive Flops in Movie History. Angus & Robertson. ISBN 0207149291.
