= Buckskin Man Tales =

Series of Western novels by Frederick Manfred

The Buckskin Man Tales is a series of five Western novels by American author Frederick Manfred which traces themes through the 19th-century Great Plains. Each novel is set in a different time and place on the American frontier, with most of them telling fictionalized stories about real historical people and events. In order of publication, the books are:

- Lord Grizzly (1954), set around 1820–1825
- Riders of Judgment (1957), set in 1892
- Conquering Horse (1959), set before 1800
- Scarlet Plume (1964), set in 1862–1863
- King of Spades (1965), set in 1860–1876
