= Mound Township, Rock County, Minnesota =

Mound Township, Minnesota
- Township
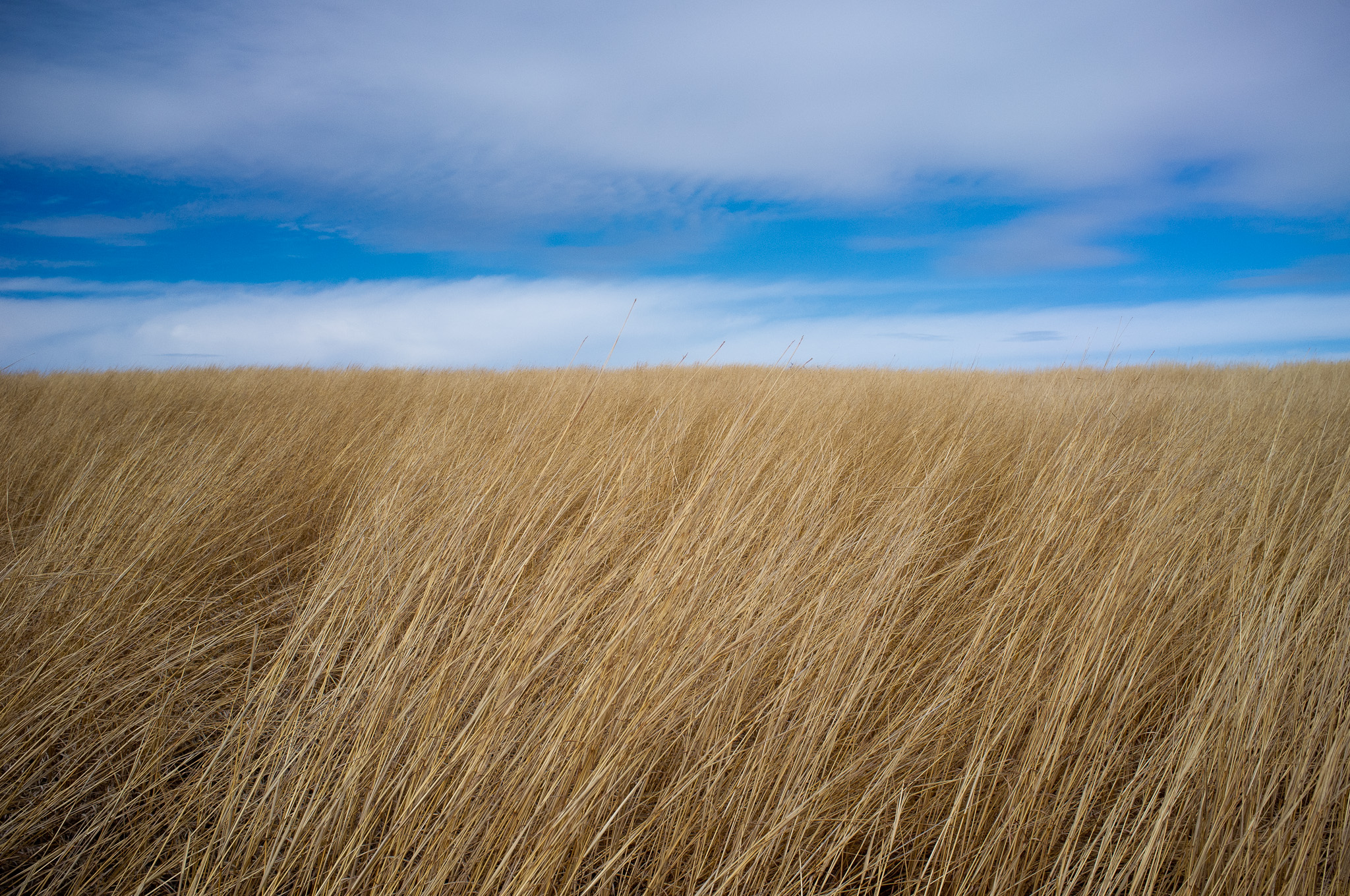
- Prairie in Blue Mounds State Park, Mound Township

- Location within the state of Minnesota Mound Township, Minnesota (the United States)
- Coordinates: 43°42′54″N 96°14′27″W
- Country: United States
- State: Minnesota
- County: Rock

Area
  - Total: 35.8 sq mi (92.8 km^{2})
  - Land: 35.7 sq mi (92.5 km^{2})
  - Water: 0.12 sq mi (0.3 km^{2})
- Elevation: 1,601 ft (488 m)

Population (2000)
  - Total: 257
  - Density: 7.3/sq mi (2.8/km^{2})
- Time zone: UTC-6 (Central (CST))
  - Summer (DST): UTC-5 (CDT)
- FIPS code: 27-44494
- GNIS feature ID: 0665050

Mound Township is a township in Rock County, Minnesota, United States. The population was 257 at the 2000 census.

Mound Township was organized in 1877, and named after a local plateau.

== Geography ==
According to the United States Census Bureau, the township has a total area of 35.8 square miles (92.8 km^{2}), of which 35.7 square miles (92.5 km^{2}) is land and 0.1 square mile (0.3 km^{2}) (0.33%) is water.

== Demographics ==
As of the census of 2000, there were 257 people, 92 households, and 77 families residing in the township. The population density was 7.2 people per square mile (2.8/km^{2}). There were 95 housing units at an average density of 2.7/sq mi (1.0/km^{2}). The racial makeup of the township was 96.89% White, 0.39% African American, 2.72% from other races. Hispanic or Latino of any race were 3.89% of the population.

There were 92 households, out of which 34.8% had children under the age of 18 living with them, 80.4% were married couples living together, and 16.3% were non-families. 12.0% of all households were made up of individuals, and 3.3% had someone living alone who was 65 years of age or older. The average household size was 2.79 and the average family size was 3.08.

In the township the population was spread out, with 25.7% under the age of 18, 8.2% from 18 to 24, 25.7% from 25 to 44, 28.0% from 45 to 64, and 12.5% who were 65 years of age or older. The median age was 40 years. For every 100 females, there were 105.6 males. For every 100 females age 18 and over, there were 107.6 males.

The median income for a household in the township was $44,688, and the median income for a family was $46,042. Males had a median income of $25,750 versus $26,406 for females. The per capita income for the township was $22,343. About 5.1% of families and 6.7% of the population were below the poverty line, including 9.6% of those under the age of eighteen and none of those 65 or over.

== Politics ==
Mound Township is located in Minnesota's 1st congressional district, represented by Mankato educator Tim Walz, a Democrat. At the state level, Mound Township is located in Senate District 22, represented by Republican Doug Magnus, and in House District 22A, represented by Republican Joe Schomacker.
