= Conquering Horse =

Novel by Frederick Manfred

First edition (publ. McDowell, Obolensky)

Conquering Horse is Frederick Manfred's first novel in a five-volume series he called The Buckskin Man Tales. It tells a mythic story about Indian life on the Great Plains before the arrival of white people to the region. Film director/writer Michael Cimino and producer Michael Gruskoff attempted to adapt Manfred's novel to film, but the project, which was in development at Universal in 1970, was tabled in 1971 because of budget issues. At one point in 1979, he reached a deal with United Artists to make the film, under the condition Heaven's Gate was a hit. The movie bombed, so this never came to fruition either.
