= Big Jane =

2001 novel by Michael Cimino

- Author: Michael Cimino
- Translator: Anne Derouet
- Language: English
- Genre: Picaresque novel
- Publisher: Gallimard
- Publication date: 5 September 2001
- Publication place: France
- Pages: 187
- Awards: Prix littéraire Lucien-Barrière (2001)

Big Jane is a novel by American filmmaker and screenwriter Michael Cimino. It was first published in French by Gallimard in 2001, in the publisher's La Noire collection, in a translation by Anne Derouet. It was Cimino's first novel.

== Plot summary ==
Set in the early 1950s, the novel follows Jane Kiernan, a 19-year-old girl from Long Island who escapes her abusive father and future prospect as a local cashier and travels across the United States by motorcycle with Billy McCain. The narrative chronicles her relationship with him and two other men until her journey takes her to Texas, Death Valley and Los Angeles. Eventually she volunteers for service in the Korean War.

== Publication and award ==
Big Jane was published in France in September 2001. The Bibliothèque nationale de France records the Gallimard edition as a 187-page volume in the La Noire collection, translated by Anne Derouet. Cimino presented the novel at the Venice International Film Festival in September 2001, where actors Bijou Phillips and Nick Stahl participated in a reading of its opening chapter. Contemporary Italian reporting described the event as Cimino's presentation of his first novel and reported his hope that it would eventually be adapted into a film. On 6 September 2001, Cimino received the Prix littéraire Lucien-Barrière for Big Jane at the Deauville American Film Festival.

== Critical reception ==
The novel was reviewed mostly in French and Italian publications. Samuel Blumenfeld, writing in Le Monde in September 2001, compared the novel with Cimino's films, particularly its depiction of Jane’s journey through 1950s America. He argued however that some of the qualities associated with Cimino's filmmaking were absent from the novel, describing Big Jane’s prose as “a dry novel that strings together dialogue”. Blumenfeld also characterized the novel as being organized around speed. Grégoire Bénabent at Chronic'art described Big Jane as "a picaresque book in the form of a spirited and moving road movie". Bénabent added that the novel “features Cimino's abrupt lyricism, his magnificent loser characters, betrayed by their country, but driven by the same visceral love for their land. They reflect Cimino himself, a great classical filmmaker, reminiscent of Ford, with the swagger of an effeminate cowboy” Francine Bordeleau reviewed Big Jane in the cultural journal Spirale in March–April 2002 in an article titled "Faire son cinéma". The review appeared on pages 24–25 of issue 183 and considered Big Jane alongside books by Catherine Breillat, Anne Brochet, Bernard Giraudeau and Marina Vlady. Fabio Tasso reviewed the Italian edition for Drammaturgia in 2003. He described Cimino's language as "direct and immediate", alternating between lyrical and crude passages, and emphasized the novel's concentration on action and dialogue. Tasso argued that Cimino's cinematic background was visible in the prose, particularly in passages resembling screenplay sequences in terms of their visual quality. Tasso further interpreted the novel as "an intense metaphor for the disintegration of the American Dream", while also identifying a possibility of redemption through continuing the journey and discovering one's place in a contradictory reality. Another Le Monde review by Gérard Meudal described the journey as an "eternal call of the great American open spaces" and emphasized the nostalgia surrounding Jane's journey. He added that “Cimino's characters are propelled into the world like marbles in a pinball machine, ultimately resulting in the same kind of collisions: bright sunshine for Billy and the Korean War for Jane.”

== Academic discussion ==
Big Jane has also been discussed in academic work on Cimino. Cédric Donnat's doctoral dissertation at Paris Nanterre University, Les choses qui s'effacent : le cinéma de Michael Cimino à l'épreuve de l'histoire (1974–1996), discusses Cimino's literary career and his decision to publish Big Jane in France. Donnat places the novel within the continuation of Cimino's artistic concerns and discusses the relationship between his filmmaking and his prose. This dissertation was subsequently published as Le cinéma de Michael Cimino : l'Amérique, un rêve évanoui by Classiques Garnier in 2019.

== Translations ==
An Italian translation of Big Jane, by Paolo Penza, was published by Fandango Libri in Rome in 2002.

== Film adaptation ==
Before the novel's publication, Cimino appeared with a treatment—written in prose at novel length—at the 58th Venice International Film Festival, where he conducted a staged reading from the piece and proclaimed that "next time, I'll return to Venice with a film made from this story." When asked in 2003 if he would still like to make a film version of Big Jane, Cimino responded, "I'd love to, and someone even suggested it to me. It may or may not become one: but for now it's a book, and I'm happy it's in this form. If I'd thought of it as a film, I'd probably still be waiting to shoot it, and it might have ended up like the fifty unrealized projects I have in the pipeline." He did, however, elude to the idea of producing a soundtrack album comprised of the songs featured in the novel, and said that he had even recorded a few.
