= Michael Gruskoff =

American film producer

- Occupation: Film producer

Michael Gruskoff is an American film producer.

== Life and career ==
Born to a Jewish family, Gruskoff started his career in the New York mailroom of the William Morris Agency, and then took a job with Creative Management Associates, where he represented Dennis Hopper, Peter Fonda, Robert Redford, Natalie Wood, Faye Dunaway, James Coburn, Steve McQueen, Peter Sellers, Al Ruddy, and Irwin Winkler. Although Ned Tanen of Universal Pictures asked him to set up and run an independent film division, he instead accepted a three picture production contract. Working with Douglas Trumbull, Michael Cimino, Sam Shepard, and Steven Bochco, he independently developed three low budget scripts: The Last Movie, Silent Running, and Conquering Horse, a Sioux language script which never made it to film but was the precursor to Dances with Wolves. In 1974, he produced Young Frankenstein, thanks to his earlier relationship with Mel Brooks, with whom he worked at William Morris, and Mike Medavoy, who he worked with at CMA. In 1999, he was hired by Nick Wechsler and Keith Addis to work for their production company, Industry Entertainment, as an in-house producer and mentor to their junior producers including Geyer Kosinski, David Seltzer, Margaret Riley, Rosalie Swedlin, Julia Chasman, Marc Evans, and David Carmel.

Gruskoff won a Cesar Award for the film Quest for Fire.

== Filmography ==
Producer

- Silent Running (1972)
- Young Frankenstein (1974)
- Rafferty and the Gold Dust Twins (1975)
- Lucky Lady (1975)
- Nosferatu the Vampyre (1979)
- My Favorite Year (1982)
- Until September (1984)
- Love at Stake (1987)
- Article 99 (1992)
- Prelude to a Kiss (1992)
- Puss 'n Boots (2006)

Executive Producer

- The Last Movie (1971)
- Quest for Fire (1981)
- Pink Cadillac (1989)
- Vivaldi (2006)
