= Scarlet Plume =

1964 novel by Frederick Manfred

Scarlet Plume is a novel by Frederick Manfred, the fourth in The Buckskin Man Tales. The Dakota War of 1862 is shown from the point of view of a woman captured by the Sioux at the beginning of the war. The novel presents the Yankton Sioux from a stylized and sympathetic perspective; although the cultural, anthropological, and historical details are accurate, the story itself is a romance in the technical sense that the word applies to Hawthorne.
