= Riders of Judgment =

1965 novel by Frederick Manfred

First edition by Random House.

Riders of Judgment is a 1965 Western novel by Frederick Manfred and the fifth book chronologically in his series The Buckskin Man Tales, which traces themes through five novels set in the 19th-century Great Plains. Riders of Judgment fictionalizes Wyoming's Johnson County War of 1892, based on Manfred's original research (which relied heavily on Johnson County Historian Thelma Condit). His analysis of events is close to the story as recounted in Helena Huntington Smith's The War on Powder River, which was published about ten years after Manfred's novel.

The novel was the source for the made-for-television film The Johnson County War, starring Tom Berenger, Burt Reynolds, and Luke Perry. Manfred's novelization uses Nate Champion, Jack Flagg, and John Tisdale as the models for his Hammett brothers, Cain, Harry, and Dale, and turns Frank Canton into a strange family nemesis called variously Hunt Lawton and Link Keeler. Manfred changes the names of the county and the nearby towns.
