= Lord Grizzly =

1954 biographical novel by Frederick Manfred

- First edition (publ. McGraw-Hill)
- Author: Frederick Manfred
- Language: English
- Publisher: McGraw-Hill
- Publication date: 1954
- OCLC: 3217854
- LC Class: PZ3.M313705 Lo

Lord Grizzly is a 1954 biographical novel by Frederick Manfred. It was part of his Buckskin Man Tales series of five novels. It was Manfred's first novel published under his new pen name, with his prior seven novels published under the name Feike Feikema. A screenplay was written by the husband of the author's daughter Freya, but no film was ever produced. The novel was a bestseller and it was a finalist for the National Book Award in 1955.

== Plot ==
It describes the survival ordeal of a real mountain man, Hugh Glass, who was attacked by a bear and abandoned in the wilderness by his companions (a young Jim Bridger and John S. Fitzpatrick), on the assumption he could not possibly live. Glass, with a broken leg and open wounds, had to crawl most of the way to Fort Kiowa to reach safety. When crawling back, Hugh could only dwell on revenge to the men who abandoned him.

== History ==
Manfred previously wrote seven novels from 1944 to 1951, under the name Feike Feikema, and they received poor reception. Due to his expanding family and debt, the author started a poll at a street corner in Minneapolis, Minnesota, in order to determine if changing his name would help improve the sale of his books. He legally changed his name to Frederick Manfred, but publishers continued to have no interest. Manfred asked a groceryman, milkman, and fuel seller in the neighborhood if he could pay them in a few months as a favor. Manfred returned to his writing and later wrote Lord Grizzly after doing much research. Part of Manfred's research for the novel was reading about life on the frontier during the 1880s, including reading around 60 books. Manfred created his own splint for his leg as Hugh Glass may have done after a bear broke Glass's leg during a fight. He inched along his backyard in Bloomington, Minnesota, as well as river bluffs, to act out what it would have been like for Glass. Since Glass only ate what he was able to catch without a weapon, Manfred ate ants, mice, grub worms, and grasshoppers. Manfred said that grasshoppers taste better than ants. Manfred journeyed across South Dakota along the Grand River to reach Chamberlain, South Dakota, where Fort Kiowa once was. A representative from a book publisher was interested in the novel and sent it in for printing. A pocket book company later bought the rights for the novel to be republished in 1956. The novel is part of Manfred's Buckskin Man Tales.

== Film ==
The husband of Manfred's daughter Freya, Tom Pope, produced a screenplay for Lord Grizzly, but studios were not interested at the time due to it being a western. When the film The Revenant, based on the 2002 novel about Hugh Glass, was released, Manfred's daughter and her husband were sad that it was not based on Lord Grizzly.

== Reception ==
Madison Jones of The New York Times wrote in reference to the five Buckskin Man Tales novels, "But the very best of these novels, and surely a Western classic, is Lord Grizzly." William Carlos Williams said, "I have never in my lifetime of reading about our West met with anything like it." Lord Grizzly was a bestseller, and a finalist for the National Book Award in 1955.
