= Blest Souls =

Unfinished 1988 film project by Michael Cimino

- Directed by: Michael Cimino
- Written by: Eoghan Harris; Robert Bolt; Michael Cimino
- Produced by: Barry Spikings; Joann Carelli; Michael Cimino
- Starring: Sean Bean; Tilda Swinton
- Cinematography: Alex Thomson
- Edited by: Françoise Bonnot
- Music by: Bono; Bob Geldof
- Production company: Nelson Entertainment
- Distributed by: Columbia Pictures
- Country: Ireland
- Language: English
- Budget: £20 million

Blest Souls is an unfinished epic historical romance film by Michael Cimino. Set in the 1920s during the Irish War of Independence, the film was to follow the life of revolutionary leader and IRA founder Michael Collins, and his secret love affair with Hazel Lavery. It was intended as Cimino's follow-up to The Sicilian (1987), another period production with biographical elements set in a European country. The first iteration of the screenplay was written by Eoghan Harris but, after disagreements, Cimino brought on Robert Bolt to help develop a new draft. Sean Bean, at the time a relatively unknown stage actor, was set to portray Collins.

Controversy regarding a film being made about Collins was generated from the start, and while reports differ as to why it was ultimately cancelled, co-producer Joann Carelli and assistant director Michael Stevenson claimed it was due to threats against the production that were made to Columbia Pictures. Despite this, a film on the subject, entitled Michael Collins (1996), was made, but without the involvement of any members of this production.

== Cast ==
- Sean Bean as Michael Collins, an Irish revolutionary and co-founder of the Irish Republican Army (Note: Other such stars as Mickey Rourke, Liam Neeson, Gabriel Byrne and Robert Redford were mooted for the role.)
- Tilda Swinton as Hazel Lavery, Collins' love interest

== Production ==
=== Development and writing ===
In early 1987, Michael Cimino agreed to direct an epic saga chronicling the life of the Irish rebel Michael Collins, based on a screenplay by Eoghan Harris. The film was backed by Nelson Entertainment and would have re-teamed Cimino with British producer Barry Spikings, who had co-produced The Deer Hunter (1978). David Puttnam of Columbia Pictures gave Cimino the greenlight to begin shooting. The project reportedly generated controversy from the start, drawing criticism from both Catholics and Protestants in Ireland. Northern Irish Protestants were particularly vocal, believing that Collins was less a national hero than a terrorist, and that the film should not be made.

Upon disagreement with Harris over Collins as a character, his draft was heavily rewritten by Cimino with the assistance of Robert Bolt, which the two developed at his home in London over the course of three months. A production representative noted that Bolt, who at the time had recently suffered a stroke, was "not working very rapidly." Their script, retitled as Blest Souls, was described subsequently by the Los Angeles Times as "a love story set against the backdrop of the Irish rebellion."

=== Pre-production and casting ===
"Unless you have experienced the changing of the seasons in a place, it is difficult to truly know it. Something happens when you are in a new place and the seasons change—from spring to summer, from summer to autumn, from autumn to spring, from spring to winter; it doesn't matter—the very act of witnessing a change changes you.

I hadn't really given it much thought, but for me at least, reading Yeats feels very different after having spent a long time in Ireland, having spent time in Sligo and Connemara, having heard the music of the language, having walked along the rivers, having seen a vast stretch of the countryside. You simply cannot help but read him differently, and the same goes for Lampedusa. When you read The Leopard, you are struck by the work's excellence and its depth, yet you view the work in a whole new light once you have spent so much time [in Sicily]. This is especially true when you have actually worked in a place, rather than merely visited it, because you were compelled to get things done, to interact directly with people, and to do so across every stratum of society: with the nobility, the middle class, the working class, and the peasantry. Whatever the social spectrum may be in a given country, you inevitably end up dealing with, and getting to know, a whole array of different people. Even The Quiet Man, a film I have always loved, seems different to me now. You hear a different resonance."

— Michael Cimino

Cimino spent countless hours reading the work of Irish poet W. B. Yeats for inspiration and to better "insinuate [him]self into another culture". He began location scouting in Edinburgh, Liverpool and in Ireland, accompanied by assistant director Michael Stevenson, who had previously worked on the productions of Heaven's Gate (1980), Year of the Dragon (1985), and The Sicilian (1987). While on a recce, Cimino and a team of production managers gained permission from the Irish Parliament to use their army for the production. Cimino also "nudged" the Liverpool City Council into making a modest investment—£200,000 a year for two years—in municipal film finance. As Liverpool's film liaison officer Paul Mingard recalled, there were plans in place to close off a street for a month, and Cimino had "offered to pay handsomely."

Cimino's longtime collaborator and producer, Joann Carelli, found the relatively unknown Sean Bean and Tilda Swinton to play the leads. Other actors who had been considered for the Collins role included Mickey Rourke, Liam Neeson, Gabriel Byrne and Robert Redford. Irish rock musicians Bono and Bob Geldof were additionally hired early on during pre-production to compose the score.

=== Filming and cancellation ===
Principal photography was due to begin in September 1987. On 1 August, Cimino shot rehearsal footage of Bean and Swinton at Burghley House in Lincolnshire, but on 18 August, the project was "temporarily postponed". By this time, Nelson had spent $2 million on pre-production costs alone. According to Carelli, the cancellation did not occur as a result of "budget, weather and script problems" as reported at the time, but rather political pressure:

One day, the Columbia production team call Michael in London and tell him to come to California. He gets on a plane. Meanwhile, a company producer goes to the team office in London and says to them: "This is ancient history! Finished!" The reason they gave: at the Atlanta headquarters of Coca-Cola, some Irishmen had threatened to blow it up if they shot a film about Michael Collins. I said to myself, "Rubbish! How dumb! Who would believe that?"

This news took Cimino by complete surprise. Carelli, nor Stevenson, were aware of the real cause considering Columbia's apparent satisfaction with the script, and since it was highly unlikely that anyone from the studio could have been worried about the weather in England and Ireland in August.

=== Aftermath ===
Bolt later admitted he didn't know what came of the project or their script: "[Cimino] fled back to America, and all of a sudden, that was that. I don't know what happened." Afterwards, Nelson executives assured Cimino that they were going to store the Blest Souls sets in readiness for a later start date if he took on an alternative project in its place. The film, entitled Santa Ana Wind, was scheduled to be filmed on location in Los Angeles in early December 1987, but was not produced either.

In the winter 1990/1991 issue of the film magazine Sight and Sound, John Pym commented on the fate of Blest Souls, writing:

Michael Cimino's desire to protect his privacy is complete. A few years ago, he planned an epic film, scripted by Robert Bolt, on the Irish patriot Michael Collins ("the title was Blest Souls, a line from Yeats"). He declines to explain why exactly Collins holds such a fascination for him—"It's too personal for me to speak of"—nor will he reveal the actor he had in mind for the lead. His enthusiasm for the project—which became a casualty of David Puttnam's departure from Columbia Pictures—remains, however, razor sharp. The Deer Hunter was produced by two enterprising Britons, Michael Deeley and Barry Spikings. Is there not now some pioneering British producer with the gumption to take on Blest Souls? The script is ready; the director's copious research notes stored safely at Elstree; the locations chosen; the Irish Cabinet, having been addressed by Cimino, is convinced of the film's impartiality and has offered full co-operation; Mrs Thatcher, the director maintains, gave permission for the use of the exterior of 10 Downing Street...

A separate project about Collins written by Neil Jordan later resurfaced and was made into a film in 1996 starring Neeson as Collins. Reflecting on his career in 2003, Cimino again mentioned the Collins project:

I never stop thinking and "making" films, but the problem is that in Hollywood, for every film you make, there are six you don't. For example, after spending a year in Ireland and England on a project about the life of Michael Collins, everything suddenly ground to a halt. Why? Because Coca-Cola had pulled out of Columbia.
