= Silent Running =

1972 American science fiction film by Douglas Trumbull

- Theatrical release poster by George Akimoto
- Directed by: Douglas Trumbull
- Written by: Deric Washburn; Michael Cimino; Steven Bochco
- Produced by: Michael Gruskoff; Marty Hornstein; Douglas Trumbull
- Starring: Bruce Dern; Cliff Potts; Ron Rifkin; Jesse Vint
- Cinematography: Charles F. Wheeler
- Edited by: Aaron Stell
- Music by: Peter Schickele
- Production company: Trumbull/Gruskoff Productions
- Distributed by: Universal Pictures
- Release date: March 10, 1972
- Running time: 89 minutes
- Country: United States
- Language: English
- Budget: $1,350,000

Silent Running is a 1972 American science fiction film. It is the directorial debut of Douglas Trumbull, and stars Bruce Dern, Cliff Potts, Ron Rifkin and Jesse Vint.

== Plot ==
In the future, all forests on Earth have become extinct from careless environmental exploitation. As many specimens as possible have been preserved in a series of enormous greenhouse-like geodesic domes serving as closed ecological systems attached to large cargo spaceships, forming part of a fleet of eight "American Airlines Space Freighters", stationed outside the orbit of Saturn.

Freeman Lowell, one of four crewmen, is the resident botanist and ecologist on one of these ships, the Valley Forge. He carefully maintains a variety of plants for their eventual return to Earth and the reforestation of the planet. He spends most of his time in the domes, cultivating the crops and attending to the animal life.

The crew of each ship receives orders to jettison and destroy their domes and return the freighters to commercial service. After four of the six Valley Forge domes are jettisoned and destroyed with nuclear charges, Lowell rebels and opts to save his ship's plants and animals. He kills crewmate John Wolf, who was trying to plant explosives in Lowell's favorite dome, and his right leg is seriously injured in the process. He then jettisons the other remaining dome and the rest of his crew mates.

Enlisting the aid of the ship's three service robots, Lowell stages a fake premature explosion as a ruse and sends the Valley Forge speeding toward Saturn in an attempt to hijack the ship and flee with the last forest dome. He reprograms the drones to perform surgery on his leg and sets the Valley Forge on a risky course through Saturn's rings. Later, as the ship endures the rough passage, Drone 3 is lost, but the ship and its remaining dome emerge relatively undamaged on the other side of the rings. Lowell gives the surviving drones the names Dewey (Drone 1) and Huey (Drone 2), while the lost Drone 3 is named Louie (a nod to Huey, Dewey, and Louie).

Lowell, Huey, and Dewey set out into deep space to maintain the forest. Lowell reprograms Huey and Dewey to plant trees and play poker. He also has them bury Wolf in the bio-dome. Lowell begins speaking to them constantly, as if they are people.

Huey is damaged when Lowell accidentally collides with it while driving a buggy recklessly, and Dewey sentimentally refuses to leave Huey's side during the repairs. As time passes, Lowell is horrified when he discovers that his bio-dome is dying, but is unable to come up with a solution to the problem. When the Berkshire—another space freighter waiting to see if the Valley Forge has survived the trip around Saturn—eventually reestablishes contact, he knows that his crimes will soon be discovered. It is then that he realizes a lack of light has restricted plant growth, and he races to install lamps to correct this situation. In an effort to save the last forest before the Berkshire arrives, Lowell jettisons the bio-dome to safety. He then detonates nuclear charges, destroying the Valley Forge, the damaged Huey, and himself in the process. The final scene is of the now well-lit forest greenhouse drifting into deep space, with Dewey tenderly caring for it, holding Lowell's battered old watering can.

== Cast ==
During a shooting break, double-amputee actor Mark Persons is visible inside the tiny Drone 1 (Dewey) costume with its cover plate removed.

- Bruce Dern as Freeman Lowell
- Cliff Potts as John Wolf
- Ron Rifkin as Marty Barker
- Jesse Vint as Andy Keenan
- Mark Persons as Drone 1 (Dewey)
- Cheryl Sparks and Steven Brown as Drone 2 (Huey)
- Larry Whisenhunt as Drone 3 (Louie)

Note: Although the end credits do not associate the main actors with their character names, each crew member may be correctly identified by a patch on their right breast. The patch is in the form of a maritime signal flag corresponding to the initial letter of their surname.

== Production ==
Douglas Trumbull was involved with creating effects for 2001: A Space Odyssey (1968), whose director, Stanley Kubrick, had wanted that film's Stargate sequence to be about Saturn; however, technical difficulties prevented completion of the sequence's special effects within the limited time available. The Saturn idea was scrapped, and Kubrick substituted Jupiter instead. Trumbull developed the sequence after production, and it was recreated for Saturn in Silent Running.

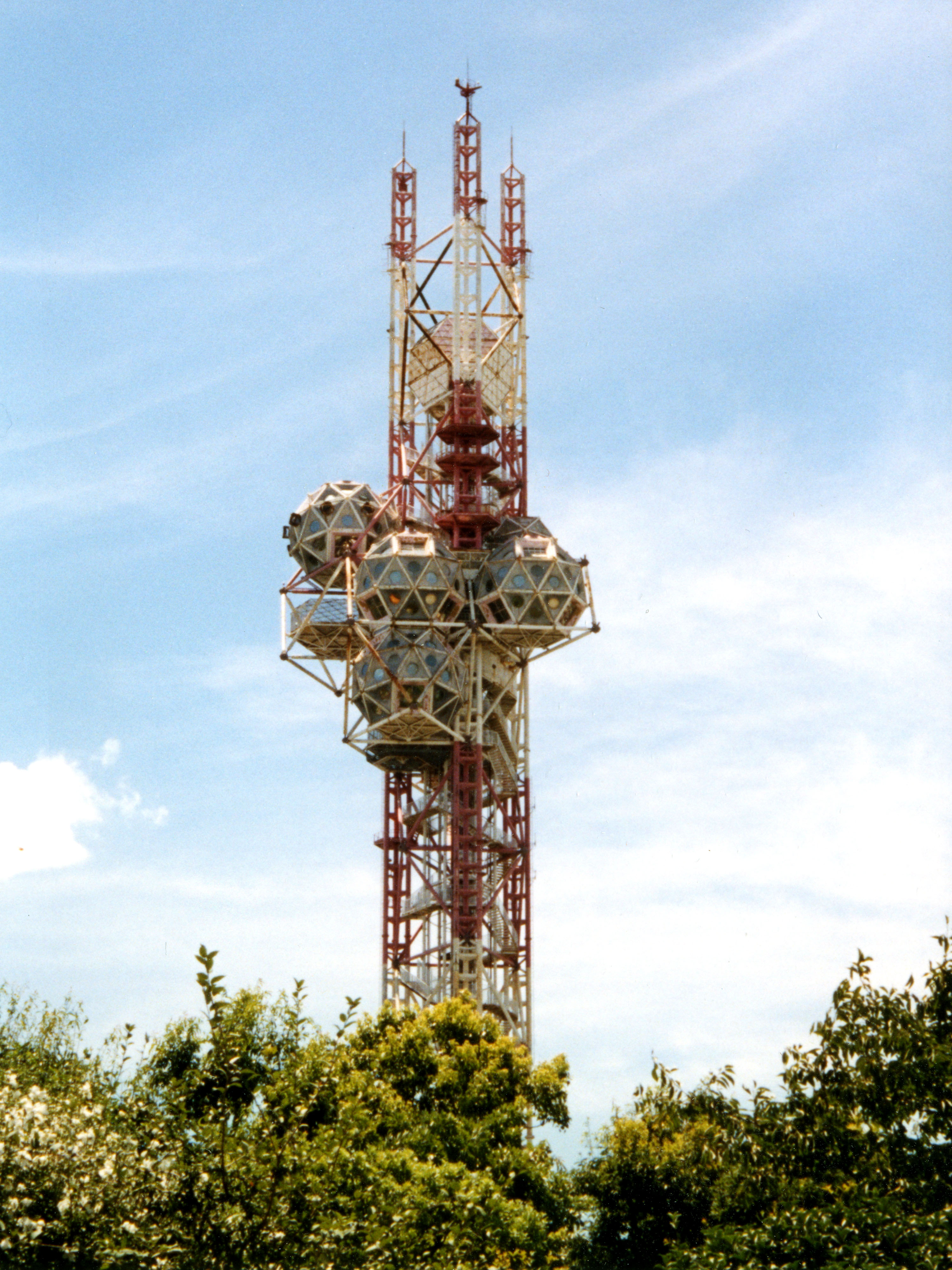
The Expo Tower from the 1970 Worlds Fair in Japan was an influence on the design of the Valley Forge

The interiors were filmed aboard the decommissioned Korean War aircraft carrier USS Valley Forge (LPH-8), which was docked at the Long Beach Naval Shipyard in Long Beach, California. Shortly after filming was completed, the carrier was scrapped. The forest environments were originally intended to be filmed in the Mitchell Park Domes in Milwaukee, but the production budget forced the sequences to be shot in a newly completed aircraft hangar in Van Nuys, California. Trumbull stated in the commentary accompanying the 2002 DVD release that the general structure of the Valley Forge spaceship was inspired by the Expo Tower at the 1970 World's Fair in Osaka, Japan, and that the geodesic domes containing the last forests of Earth's future on the Valley Forge were based on the Missouri Botanical Garden's Climatron dome.

Three freighters are shown in the film: the Valley Forge, the Berkshire and the Sequoia. Five other ships that carried domes—the Yellowstone, Acadia, Blue Ridge, Glacier, and Mojave—are also mentioned. Each ship features a designation on the hull that notes the area from which some of its flora and fauna samples were taken. The Valley Forge is listed as "Bahia Honda Subtropical," indicating at least some specimens were taken from this area of the Florida Keys.

The model of the Valley Forge was 25 feet (7.6 m) long, and took six months to build from a combination of custom castings and the contents of approximately 800 prefabricated model-aircraft or tank kits. After filming was completed, American Airlines expressed an interest in sending the model on the tour circuit, but this was not feasible due to its fragility. (During filming, pieces of the model frequently detached.) It was subsequently dismantled after sitting for several years in Trumbull's personal storage facility. Several pieces, including the domes, wound up in the hands of collectors. Several domes survive, including one that now rests in the Science Fiction Museum and Hall of Fame in Seattle, and another that was sold at auction in 2008.

The three drones were played by four bilateral amputees, an idea inspired by Johnny Eck, a sideshow performer of the early 20th century who was born without lower limbs. The 20-pound (9.1 kg) drone suits were custom-tailored for the actors. The suits are in Trumbull's personal collection.

The sound effects, including the drones, were created by uncredited composer Joseph Byrd. They were generated on a modified ARP 2600 synthesizer with added Oberheim Synthesizer Expander Modules (SEMs).

Footage from the film would later be reused in Universal Pictures's 1978 series Battlestar Galactica and its sequel Galactica 1980, notably depicting the agro ships. Shots of the internal domes would also be re-used, with Bruce Dern making a fleeting cameo appearance in the episode "The Magnificent Warriors" due to re-use of footage from the film.

== Soundtrack ==
The soundtrack was written by Peter Schickele, a bassoonist who also composed comedy music under the name P. D. Q. Bach. It contains two songs written by Schickele and Diane Lampert, which were performed by vocalist Joan Baez: "Silent Running" and "Rejoice in the Sun". The two songs were issued as a single by Decca (32890). An LP was released by Decca in 1972 (DL 7–9188) and later reissued by Varèse Sarabande on black (STV-81072) and green (VC-81072) vinyl. In 1998, a limited-release CD by the Valley Forge Record Groupe included an additional track with the spoken introduction "God Bless These Gardens." A CD with audio restoration was released in 2016 by Intrada, Special Collection Volume 369.

The title song was later covered by David Matthews on his 1977 album Dune.

The band 65daysofstatic recorded an alternative soundtrack to the film, released in 2011 and commissioned by the Glasgow Film Festival.

== Reception ==
On the review aggregator website Rotten Tomatoes, 71% of 35 critics' reviews are positive. The website's consensus reads: "It doesn't fulfill the potential of its ambitious themes, but Silent Running stands as a decidedly unique type of sci-fi journey marked by intimate character work and a melancholic mood." Metacritic, which uses a weighted average, assigned the film a score of 67 out of 100, based on 13 critics, indicating "generally favorable" reviews.

Vincent Canby, reviewing the film for The New York Times, said that Silent Running "is no jerry-built science fiction film, but it's a little too simple-minded to be consistently entertaining." Carl Sagan criticized the "technically proficient" film for depicting a future in which people have forgotten the inverse-square law, and that plants need sunlight. Roger Ebert awarded the film his highest rating of four stars and praised Dern as "a very good, subtle actor." Gene Siskel gave the film two stars out of four and compared it unfavorably to 2001: A Space Odyssey, saying that it had "the same effects but none of the wit or intelligence." Arthur D. Murphy of Variety lauded the "excellent special effects" and "broadly entertaining script" but faulted the "crucial miscasting" of Dern, explaining, "Walking around often in robes which crudely suggest some kind of airborne vegetarian Noah, and otherwise suggesting an out-to-lunch mentality, his characterization does not evoke empathy." Charles Champlin of the Los Angeles Times praised the film for avoiding "the usual heavy hokum associated with the [sci-fi] genre" and called it "a solid and well-disciplined first film. The spaceries really are impressive and the movie is an ingenious family entertainment which offers something to think about." Gary Arnold of The Washington Post called the film "the most original and interesting science-fiction melodrama since Planet of the Apes and a new classic of the genre." Penelope Gilliatt of The New Yorker wrote: "The robots have endearing qualities, paddling about as if in galoshes, and they play a wonderful game of poker, but this is sci-fi with the soul of an editorial." British film critic Mark Kermode has said that the film is a personal favorite and that he prefers it to 2001.

Nods and various easter eggs to the film would make their way in numerous genre media, including Ronald D. Moore's 2003 Battlestar Galactica miniseries and Steven Spielberg's 2018 film adaptation Ready Player One. As testament to the film's cult status, a screen-matched costume jumpsuit worn by Bruce Dern originating from Douglas Trumbull's personal collection sold for US$40,625 in 2020.

The picture won the 1972 Golden Asteroid for best picture at the International Science Fiction Film Festival in Trieste, Italy.

Joel Hodgson credits Silent Running as being a direct influence on the concept of Mystery Science Theater 3000, with both Silent Running and MST3K featuring a single human aboard a spaceship accompanied only by robot companions. MST3K and its Joel Robinson character also occasionally reflected Freeman Lowell (Dern)'s hippie-like nature.

== Adaptation ==
A novelization of the film was published by Scholastic Books in 1972. It was written by longtime children's book author Harlan Thompson, based on the screen story and screenplay by Michael Cimino, Deric Washburn and Steven Bochco. It features expanded scenes (in flashback) taking place on Earth.

== Remake ==
In October 1998, it was reported that Simon West had entered into a deal with Universal Pictures to develop and direct a remake of Silent Running from a script by Rudy Gaines and John Rice.

== Home media ==
The film has been released several times on home video by Universal Pictures Home Entertainment, beginning with the Betamax "pan and scan" release in 1982, and several VHS releases that followed. A DVD was released featuring the film's original 1.85:1 aspect ratio, first on March 18, 1998, and then again on May 21, 2002 - this time with various extra features. A Blu-ray of the film was released (for Region B) on 14 November 2011 by Eureka for the film's 40th-anniversary, initially in a steelbook case. Another was released by Arrow on 17 November 2020, from a 4K scan and 2K restoration of the film, with additional extras. Both were released under license from Universal Studios, with transfers approved by director Douglas Trumbull. This same approved 4K transfer was used to create a 4K UHD version of the film, again released by Arrow Video in December 2022.

== See also ==
- Astrobotany
- Closed ecological system
- Environmentalism
- List of American films of 1972
- Plants in space
- Space farming
- Space habitat
