= Until September =

1984 film by Richard Marquand

- Theatrical release poster
- Directed by: Richard Marquand
- Written by: Janice Lee Graham
- Produced by: Michael Gruskoff; Vincent Malle
- Starring: Karen Allen; Thierry Lhermitte; Christopher Cazenove; Marie-Catherine Conti
- Cinematography: Philippe Welt
- Edited by: Sean Barton
- Music by: John Barry
- Production company: United Artists
- Distributed by: MGM/UA Entertainment Co.
- Release date: September 21, 1984
- Running time: 95 mins
- Country: United States
- Language: English
- Budget: $3.5 million
- Box office: $4,239,154 (domestic)

Until September is a 1984 romantic drama film directed by Richard Marquand and starring Karen Allen and Thierry Lhermitte. The plot concerns an American tourist and a French banker who fall in love in Paris. It was panned by critics, and underperformed at the box office.

== Plot ==
Moe Alexander (Karen Allen) is an American tourist in Paris. When she misses her plane home, she ends up being stuck in Paris for a while until her visa gets approved and goes to stay at the apartment of a friend who is away for the summer. There she meets Xavier de la Perouse (Thierry Lhermitte), a wealthy French banker. Xavier is married but his wife and family are away. As he spends time with Moe, their mutual attraction is overwhelming and they fall in love.

== Cast ==
- Karen Allen as Mo Alexander
- Thierry Lhermitte as Xavier de la Perouse
- Christopher Cazenove as Philip
- Hutton Cobb as Andrew
- Michael Mellinger as Colonel Viola
- Nitza Shaul as Sylvia
- Rachel Robertson as Carol
- Raphaëlle Spencer as Jenny
- Joanna Pavlis as Marcia
- Helen Desbiez as Sophie
- Steve Gadler as Carry
- Gérard Caillaud as Airline Official

== Production ==
Janice Lee Graham wrote the screenplay based on the eleven years she lived in Paris. After being hired as a secretary for 20th Century Fox executive Edward S. Feldman she sold the script to Michael Gruskoff in 1982. Principal photography began on July 18, 1983, in Paris.

== Reception ==
Until September earned $4,239,154 from its brief theatrical run in North America. It debuted in sixth place for its opening weekend. It was universally panned by critics, holding a 0% rating on Rotten Tomatoes.
