= Blue Mounds State Park =

State park in Minnesota, United States

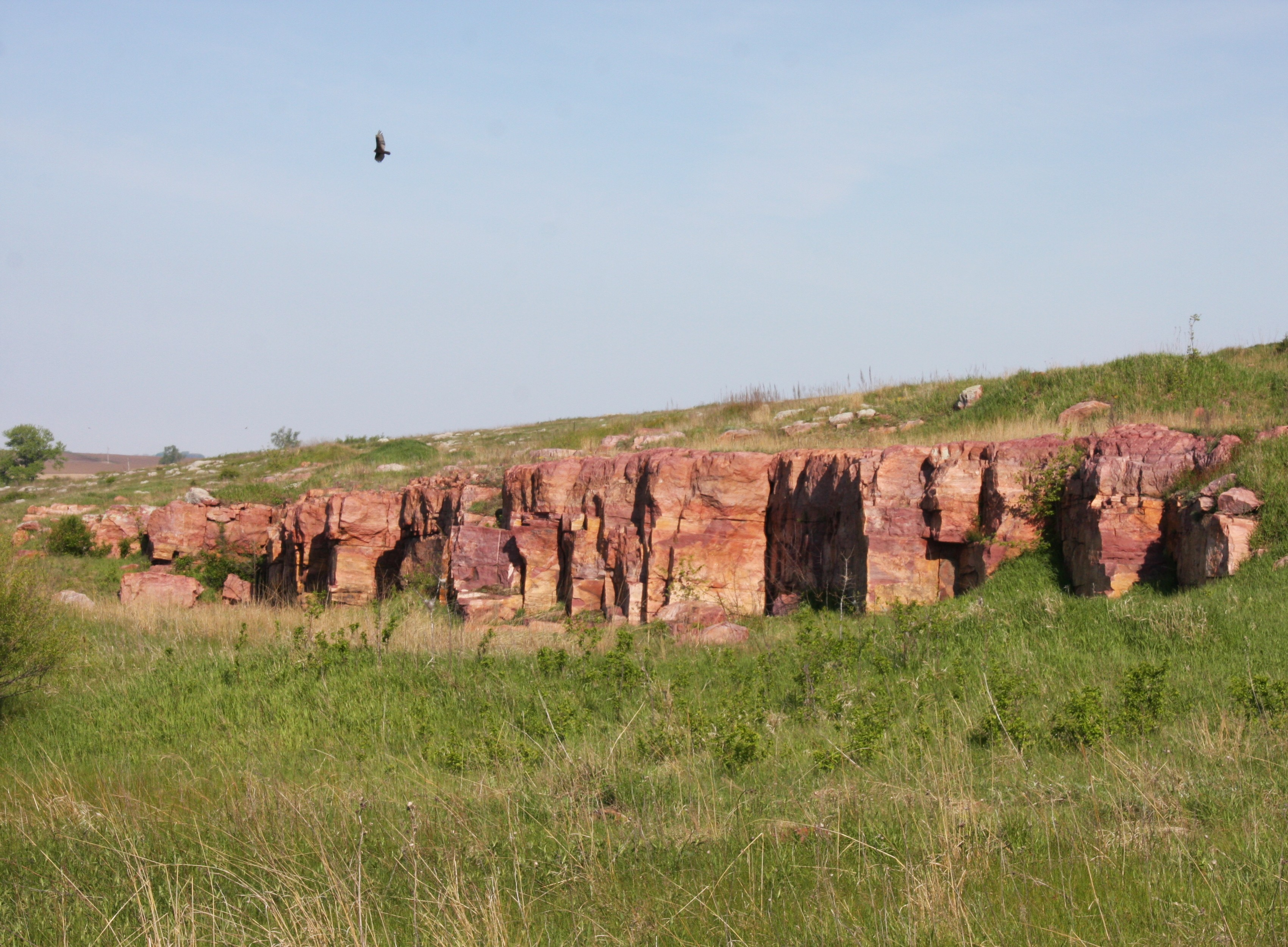
- Sioux Quartzite bedrock in Blue Mounds State Park

- Location within Minnesota Location within the United States
- Location: Rock, Minnesota, United States
- Coordinates: 43°42′24″N 96°11′13″W
- Area: 1,567 acres (6.34 km^{2})
- Elevation: 1,608 ft (490 m)
- Established: 1937
- Governing body: Minnesota Department of Natural Resources
- Blue Mounds State Park WPA/Rustic Style Historic Resources
- U.S. National Register of Historic Places
- U.S. Historic district
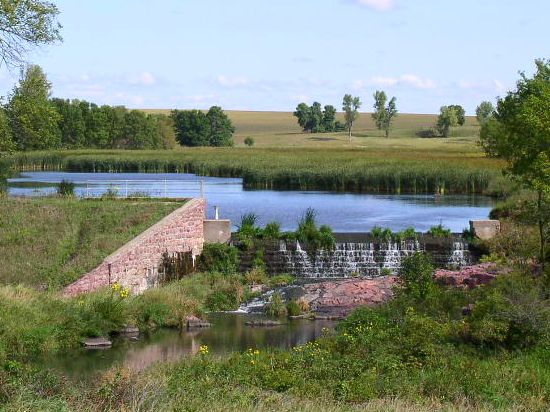
- Upper Dam and Upper Mound Lake, constructed 1938
- Location: Mound Township
- Coordinates: 43°43′2″N 96°11′21″W
- Area: 60 acres (24 ha)
- Built: 1937–1942
- Architect: National Park Service, Minnesota Division of Drainage & Waters, Works Progress Administration
- Architectural style: NPS Rustic
- MPS: Minnesota State Park CCC/WPA/Rustic Style MPS
- NRHP reference No.: 89001657
- Added to NRHP: 1989-10-25

Blue Mounds State Park is a state park in Rock County, Minnesota, United States, near the town of Luverne. It protects an American bison herd which grazes on one of the state's largest prairie remnants.

The state park is named after a linear escarpment of Precambrian Sioux Quartzite bedrock which, although pink in color, is said to have appeared blueish in the distance to early settlers. Parts of the cliff are up to 100 feet (30 m) high. Unusual in the surrounding prairie landscape, they are a popular site for rock climbing.

The park also preserves a 1,250-foot-long (380 m) line of rocks aligned by Plains Indians which marks where the sun rises and sets on the spring and fall equinoxes. It also has a small reservoir for swimming, the only lake in Rock County. The park's interpretive center was once the home of the author Frederick Manfred.

Four structures and one building in the park, built by the Works Progress Administration in the 1930s, are listed on the National Register of Historic Places.

== Wildlife ==
The park is home to a small population of coyotes and deer as well as various birds.

=== Bison herd ===
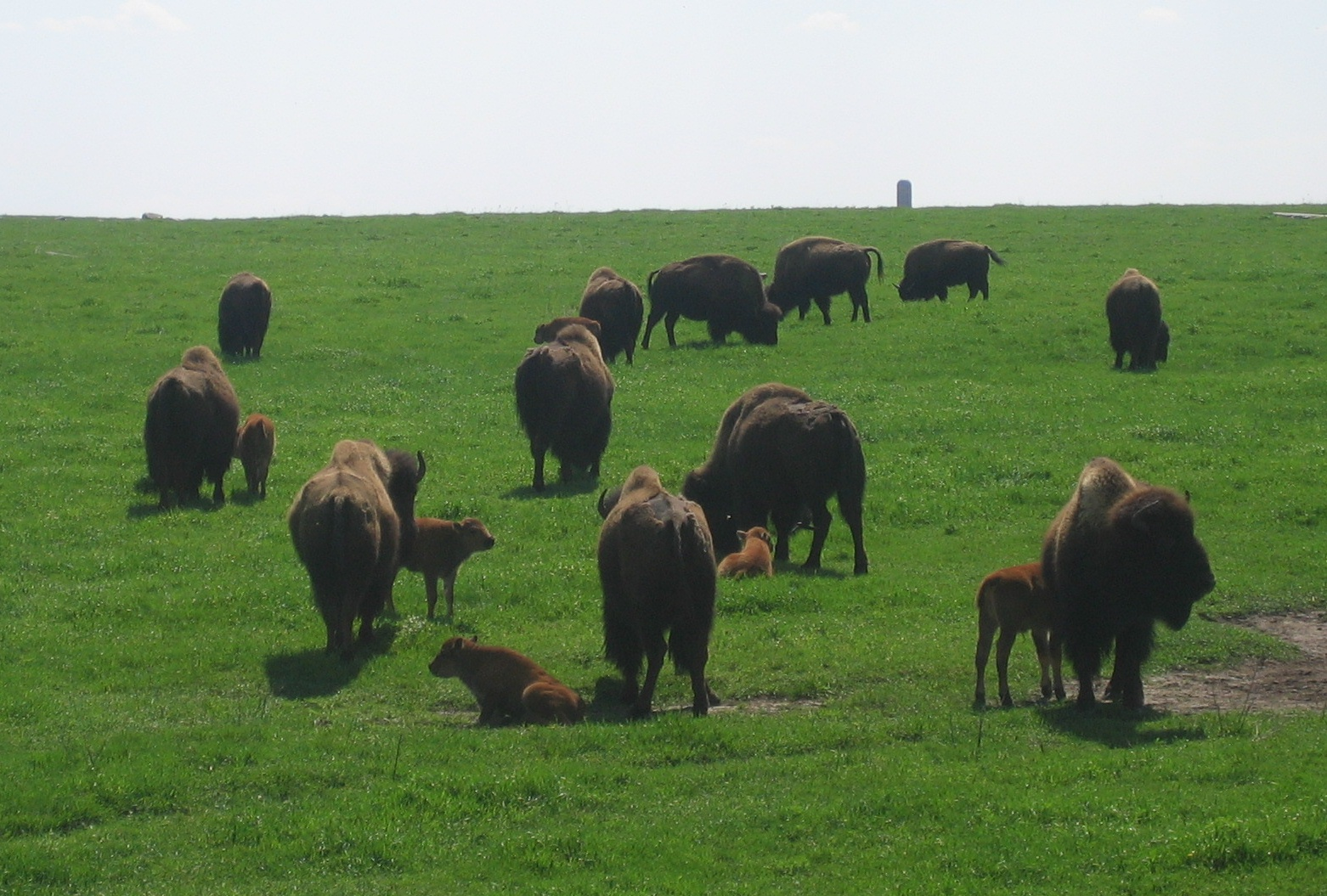
Bison herd in the park in spring

In 1961, three bison were acquired from the Fort Niobrara National Wildlife Refuge in Nebraska. In 2012, the Minnesota Zoo and the Minnesota Department of Natural Resources entered into an agreement to form a partnership and develop a Minnesota Bison Conservation Herd. In 2017, a bull with Yellowstone genetics was added to the herd. Diverse genetics allows for healthier populations as the park participates in the conservation of bison. The herd varies in size from roughly 65 animals in the winter to around 100 in the summer, after calves are born. To keep the population at a sustainable level, individuals are sold in a fall auction. The bison range is fenced off, and visitors are warned not to approach when these strong and unpredictable animals are near the fenceline.

== Cultural history ==
According to local folklore the mound was used as a buffalo jump before European settlement, but no archaeological evidence has yet been found as verification. The soil of the mound was too thin and boulder-strewn for farming, saving it from the plow, although it was grazed.

Parkland was originally established north of the Blue Mound for the purpose of providing work relief during the Great Depression and water recreation. WPA crews built two dams on Mound Creek, creating Upper and Lower Mound Lake — 18 acres (7.3 ha) and 28 acres (11 ha) respectively — and facilities such as picnic grounds and a beach house. The 195-acre (79 ha) Mound Springs Recreational Reserve opened in 1937. In the 1950s trees were planted around the lakes and campground. The lower dam was destroyed by flooding in June 2014, draining Lower Mound Lake, and in June 2016 the Minnesota Department of Natural Resources announced the dam would not be rebuilt.

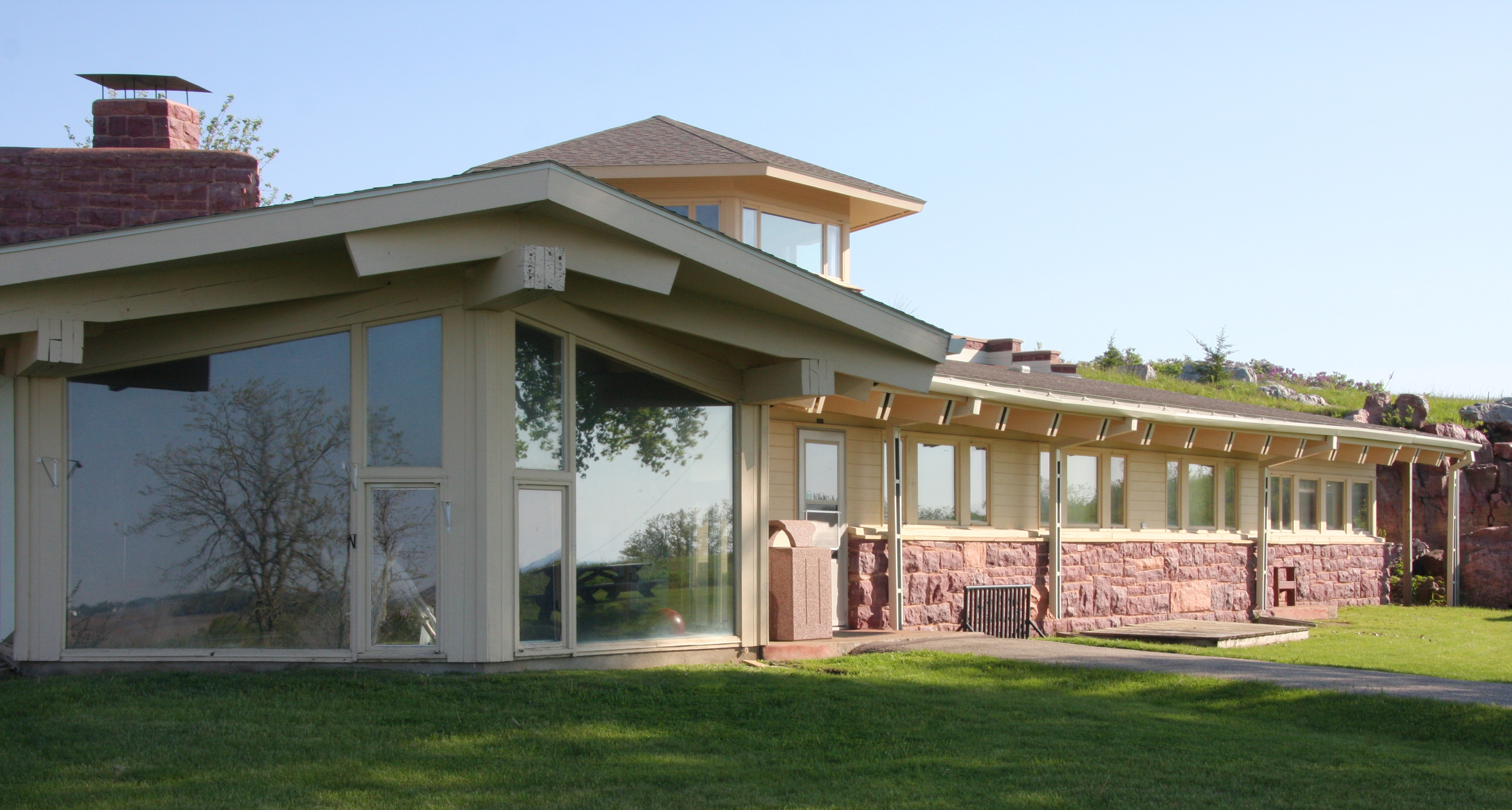
The Frederick Manfred House

Land was added in 1955 and 1961, at which point the name was changed to Blue Mounds State Park. More lands were authorized in 1963 and 1965 to include the whole of Blue Mound and property to either side. The state bought Frederick Manfred's house in 1972 to turn into an interpretive center, although they let him live there for three more years. Because the house was at the southern end of the mound and the developed part of the park was at the north end, a connecting road was surveyed across the top. Local conservationists argued the state out of this plan several times in the 1970s, citing the impact to the environment atop the mound. In 1986 a road was paved from the house south to a county highway instead, so that visitors to the interpretive center must hike in from the north or drive around the edge of the park to the south entrance.

In 1989 the WPA developments were listed on the National Register of Historic Places as a 60-acre (24 ha) historic district. The district contains five contributing properties—four structures and one building: Upper Dam, Upper Mound Lake, Lower Dam, Lower Mound Lake (all created in 1938) and a latrine (built 1939–42) located by the current cart-in campground. They are considered historically significant as examples of New Deal federal work relief and recreational development in southwestern Minnesota, and architecturally significant for their unique National Park Service rustic design using Sioux Quartzite. The two dams are particularly noteworthy, blending into the natural rock walls of the creek, an exceptional application of rustic style to utilitarian structures.

== Incidents ==
Blue Mounds State Park was the site of a murder on May 20, 2001, when Carrie Nelson, then 20, was beaten to death while working alone in the park office. A coroner said the wounds to her head appeared as if she'd been struck with a rock. The killer apparently stole about $2,000 from the park coffers. The case went unsolved for six years until May 2007 when, in a routine check of DNA samples of prison inmates in South Dakota, police found a match with DNA samples gathered from the crime scene. The samples linked Randy Leeroyal Swaney, 35, to the murder. He was serving time for a 2004 burglary. In August 2008, Randy Swaney was sentenced to life in prison.
