= The Golden Bowl (Manfred novel) =

1944 novel by Frederick Manfred

First edition (publ. Webb, St. Paul, MN)

The Golden Bowl is the first novel by Frederick Manfred, published in 1944 under his birth name Feike Feikema. It was published by the Minnesota-based Webb Publishing Co.. Manfred insisted on this title, which is identical to Henry James' better known novel, even when his friend Sinclair Lewis argued against it.

== Plot ==
The novel is set during the Dust Bowl in Oklahoma. It follows a few months in the life of Maury Grant, an itinerant farm boy whose family has been wiped out in the disaster. Grant becomes a reluctant hired hand at the Thor family farm in southwestern South Dakota, leaving them in despair of the hopelessness of their situation, returning a few weeks later and, Manfred implies, remaining. The last pages depict a "black blizzard" with gripping vividness.

== Background ==
Manfred drew on his life experience to write the story. He grew up on an Iowa farm, then after graduating from college, he struck out to see the country, hoboing west to Yellowstone and back. The Golden Bowl is based on those adventures and his firsthand experience of the Dust Bowl. (Many years later, Manfred would write a memoir of his cross-country adventure, The Wind Blows Free.)

The Golden Bowl has been in and out of print repeatedly, including a fiftieth-anniversary edition by the South Dakota Humanities Center.
