= Frederick Manfred =

American writer (1912–1994)

- Born: Frederick Feikes Feikema VII; January 6, 1912; Doon, Iowa, U.S.
- Died: September 7, 1994 (aged 82); Luverne, Minnesota, U.S.
- Occupation: Novelist
- Children: Freya Manfred
- Writing career
- Pen name: Feike Feikema
- Genre: Western
- Notable work: Lord Grizzly

Frederick Feikema Manfred (January 6, 1912 – September 7, 1994) was an American writer of Westerns, very much connected to his native region: the American Midwest, and the prairies of the West. He named the area where the borders of Minnesota, Iowa, South Dakota, and Nebraska meet "Siouxland."

== Biography ==
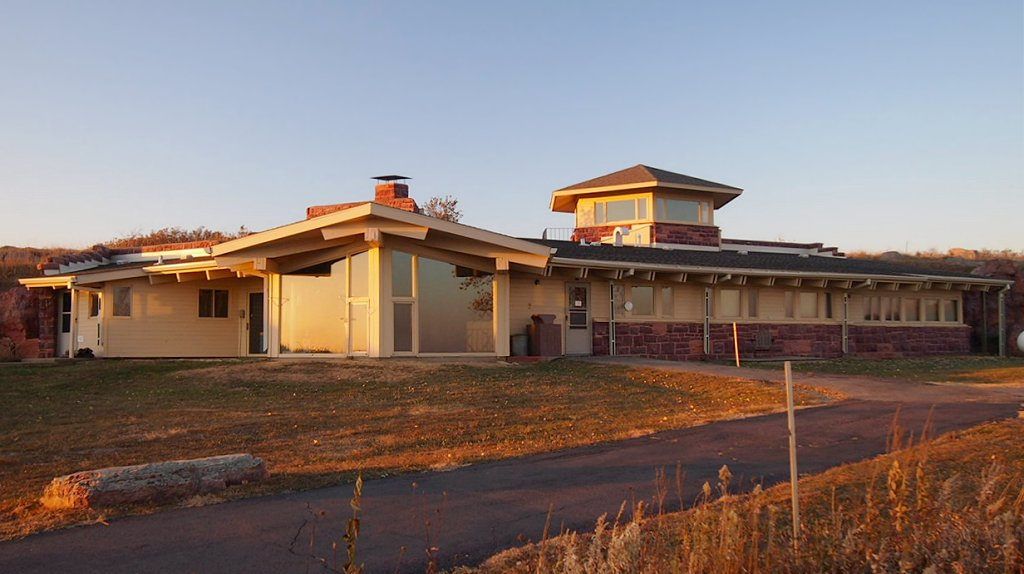
Manfred's house outside Luverne, Minnesota, for a time used as the Blue Mounds State Park interpretive center

Manfred was born in Doon, Iowa. He was baptized Frederick Feikes Feikema VII, and he used the name Feike Feikema when he published his first books. He was the oldest of six boys, all over six feet tall, and was himself six feet nine inches tall. Manfred was a third generation Frisian American, whose family originated in the village of Tzum, in the Dutch province of Friesland.

Manfred was raised in the Christian Reformed Church. James Bratt argues that Manfred rebelled against this upbringing, being filled with "religious doubts and ethical chafings." Bratt goes on to discuss this influence that this upbringing had on Manfred's writing, and suggests that the qualities of his work - "earthy detail, metaphysical sweep, both set to biblical cadence - are precisely those of his native faith."

In 1937, Manfred starting working as a sports reporter for The Minneapolis Journal. He was fired a couple years later, due to his involvement in union organization. Shortly after this, Manfred developed tuberculosis and entered Glen Lake Sanatorium in Oak Terrace, Minnesota, in April 1940. It was in this sanatorium that he met his future wife Maryanna Shorba. Manfred left the sanatorium in 1942 and worked on the staff of Modern Medicine and as assistant campaign manager for Hubert Humphrey, who was a candidate for mayor of Minneapolis. He fictionalized this period in his book Boy Almighty, published under the name Feike Feikema.

Manfred published The Primitive, the first novel in his World's Wanderer trilogy, in 1949. It was poorly received, and the next two books in the trilogy, The Brother (1950) and The Giant (1951), met with mixed reviews. In 1952 Manfred decided to change his name from Frederick Feikema to Frederick Feikema Manfred, and Frederick Manfred became his publishing name. Lord Grizzly, the first of The Buckskin Man Tales, was the first work Manfred published under his new name. It was a best seller and one of the finalists for the National Book Award in 1954. The Buckskin Man Tales are the novels Lord Grizzly, Conquering Horse, Scarlet Plume, King of Spades, and Riders of Judgment.

For a time he lived in a house which is now the derelict interpretive center of Blue Mounds State Park in Rock County, Minnesota. He attended Calvin College in Michigan. He had three children with his wife Maryanna Shorba Manfred: Freya Manfred, Frederick Manfred Jr., and Marya Manfred.

Manfred was the writer-in-residence in the English Department at the University of South Dakota during the 1970s and 1980s. According to his daughter Freya Manfred, "Many of those who drank coffee with him, watched him, listened to him, learned from him, are now well-known national or regional writers: Pete Dexter, Michael Doane, Elly Welt, William Earls, Dan O'Brien, Linda Hasselstrom, Craig Volk, Bill Holm, John Calvin Rezmerski, and Joe and Nancy Paddock."

Manfred died in Luverne, Minnesota in 1994, of a brain tumor, at the age of 82. In 2013, a Frisian translation was published of Manfred's autobiographical novel Green Earth, titled De Griene Ierde.

== Fiction ==
- The Golden Bowl (1944)
- Boy Almighty (1945)
- This is the Year (1947), Doubleday & Company
- The Chokecherry Tree (1948)
- The Primitive (1949), Doubleday & Company
- The Brother (1950)
- The Giant (1951)
- Lord Grizzly (1954), ISBN 0-8398-2591-9, about the ordeal of mountain man Hugh Glass
- Morning Red (1956)
- Riders of Judgment (1957), ISBN 0-8398-2593-5 fictionalization of Wyoming's Johnson County War
- Conquering Horse (1959), ISBN 0-8398-2590-0
- Scarlet Plume (1964), ISBN 0-8398-2594-3
- King of Spades (1965), ISBN 0-8398-2592-7
- The Man Who Looked Like the Prince of Wales (1965)
- Eden Prairie (1968)
- The Manly-Hearted Woman (1976)
- Milk of Wolves (1976)
- Green Earth (1977)
- Sons of Adam (1980)
- Flowers of Desire (1989)
- No Fun On Sunday (1990)
- Of Lizards and Angels (1992)

Note: There are also a handful of non-fiction titles, notably The Wind Blows Free, a memoir of the Dust Bowl, Conversations with Frederick Manfred, and Prime Fathers and Duke's Mixture, anthologies of FM's essays.

== Sources ==
- "Frederick Manfred." Dictionary of Literary Biography 212:185-197. 1999.
- The Frederick Manfred Information Page
- Robert C. Wright, Frederick Manfred (Twayne's United States Authors series; TUSAS 336)
