= KLOH =

Radio station in Minnesota

- Pipestone, Minnesota; United States
- Broadcast area: Pipestone-Marshall
- Frequency: 1050 kHz
- Branding: KLOH 1050

Programming
- Format: Country
- Affiliations: Fox News Radio

Ownership
- Owner: Collin Christensen and Carmen Christensen; (Christensen Broadcasting, LLC)
- Sister stations: KCLP, KDWC, KISD, KJOE KMZM KJAM (AM)

History
- First air date: June 23, 1955
- Call sign meaning: K Land Of Hiawatha

Technical information
- Licensing authority: FCC
- Facility ID: 70737
- Class: B
- Power: 9,380 watts day 432 watts night
- Transmitter coordinates: 43°59′43.00″N 96°20′41.00″W
- Translator: 94.1 K231DG (Pipestone)

Links
- Public license information: Public file; LMS
- Webcast: Listen live
- Website: klohradio.com

KLOH (1050 AM) is a radio station broadcasting a country music format serving Pipestone, Minnesota, with rimshot coverage in the Sioux Falls, South Dakota area. The station once broadcast in AM stereo using the Motorola C-QUAM system. KLOH is currently owned by Collin Christensen and Carmen Christensen, through licensee Christensen Broadcasting, LLC.

== History ==
KLOH officially signed on the air in June 1955, licensed to the Pipestone Radio Corporation. The call letters were chosen to stand for "K-Land Of Hiawatha," a reference to the local Pipestone National Monument and the regional cultural heritage. Originally a daytime-only operation with 1,000 watts, its first studios were located in a basement downtown next to the Eagle Cafe. In 1961, the station moved to its current "twin tower" transmitter and studio site west of Pipestone. The station was purchased in 1976 by Wallace Christensen, whose family has owned and operated the station for nearly 50 years. In late 2025, the Christensen family expanded their regional footprint by acquiring four additional stations in Luverne, Minnesota, and Madison, South Dakota.

== Programming ==
KLOH is the exclusive home for Pipestone Area High School sports. Bill VanHoecke covers Arrow football, volleyball, boys' and girls' basketball, baseball, and softball. KLOH is also a South Dakota State University affiliate. They cover Jackrabbit Football and Men's and Women's basketball. News and Weather is delivered each hour on the station from FOX News Radio and Weatherology. It is a member of the Linder Farm Network. and on weekends, the station features shows like Under the Hood Show, along with several local church services. The station is a primary regional affiliate for South Dakota State University (SDSU) Jackrabbit Athletics, carrying football and both men's and women's basketball.
