= KISD (FM) =

- Pipestone, Minnesota; United States
- Broadcast area: Pipestone-Worthington-Marshall-Sioux Falls
- Frequency: 98.7 MHz
- Branding: Oldies Channel 98.7 FM KISD

Programming
- Format: Oldies
- Affiliations: The True Oldies Channel

Ownership
- Owner: Collin Christensen and Carmen Christensen; (Christensen Broadcasting, LLC)
- Sister stations: KCLP, KDWC, KJOE, KLOH KJAM (AM) KMZM

History
- First air date: November 20, 1969 (as KLOH-FM)
- Former call signs: KLOH-FM (1968–1987)

Technical information
- Licensing authority: FCC
- Facility ID: 70738
- Class: C0
- ERP: 100,000 watts
- HAAT: 309 meters (1,014 ft)
- Transmitter coordinates: 43°53′52″N 95°56′50″W

Links
- Public license information: Public file; LMS
- Webcast: Listen live
- Website: www.kisdradio.com

KISD (98.7 FM) is a radio station broadcasting an oldies format. The station serves the Pipestone and Worthington areas, with rimshot coverage in the Marshall and Sioux Falls areas. The station is currently owned by Collin Christensen and Carmen Christensen, through licensee Christensen Broadcasting, LLC. KISD derives a portion of its programming from Scott Shannon's The True Oldies Channel from ABC Radio. Hourly nationwide news updates come from FOX News Network.

== History ==
The station first began broadcasting in November 1969 under the call sign KLOH-FM. It was established as a sister station to Pipestone's AM outlet, KLOH, which had been on the air since 1955. KLOH-FM was largely a simulcast of its AM sister for two decades. In 1976, Wallace "Wally" Christensen purchased both KLOH AM and FM from the Ingstad Corporation. Under Christensen's ownership, the station split from its simulcast of it sister. KLOH-FM changed its calls to KISD on September 16, 1987. With the call change, the station flipped to oldies, a format which it has kept for nearly 40 years.

In 2025, Christensen Broadcasting expanded their reach by purchasing stations in the region from Connoisseur Media.
