= KJOE =

Coordinates: 43.898°N 95.948°W

- Slayton, Minnesota; United States
- Broadcast area: Pipestone-Worthington-Marshall
- Frequency: 106.1 MHz (HD Radio)
- Branding: K-Joe 106.1

Programming
- Format: Country
- Affiliations: Fox News Radio

Ownership
- Owner: Collin Christensen and Carmen Christensen; (Christensen Broadcasting, LLC)
- Sister stations: KCLP, KDWC, KISD, KLOH KMZM KJAM (AM)

History
- First air date: 1993
- Former call signs: KAED (1993); KLOH-FM (1993-1995)

Technical information
- Licensing authority: FCC
- Facility ID: 70736
- Class: C2
- ERP: 10,000 watts
- HAAT: 296 meters

Links
- Public license information: Public file; LMS
- Webcast: Listen Live
- Website: KJOE Online

KJOE (106.1 FM) is a radio station in Slayton, Minnesota, United States, broadcasting a country music format. The station serves the Pipestone and Worthington areas, with rimshot coverage in the Marshall area. The station is owned by Collin Christensen and Carmen Christensen, through licensee Christensen Broadcasting, LLC. The station is carries local sports coverage, providing live broadcasts for Murray County Central (MCC) athletics and regional high school tournaments.

== Programming ==
KJOE is home to Murray County Central School's Sports and Joel Herrig has the call of Basketball, Volleyball, and Football. On Weekdays, The Jeff and Ryan KJOE Morning show starts at 6am and goes to 8:45am, then Rick Frietag to 12pm, Joel Herrig to 3, Mylan Ray to 7, Joe Dagel to 10, and the KJOE Overnight Show with Wade Post 10pm to 6am weeknights. The station is also home to many church services on Sundays. Other programming include; MN Matters on Sunday mornings along with several area church services, and the KLOH/KJOE Sportsman's Report.

== History ==
The station was first authorized in the early 1990s as part of a new frequency allocation for the Slayton market. It officially signed on the air in 1993. Prior to adopting its current identity, the station briefly held the call sign KAED in early 1993, followed by KLOH-FM later that year to align with its sister AM station KLOH. On February 17, 1995, the station officially transitioned to its current KJOE call letters and "K-Joe 106.1" branding.
