= National Register of Historic Places listings in Rock County, Minnesota =

Location of Rock County in Minnesota

This is a list of the National Register of Historic Places listings in Rock County, Minnesota. It is intended to be a complete list of the properties and districts on the National Register of Historic Places in Rock County, Minnesota, United States. The locations of National Register properties and districts for which the latitude and longitude coordinates are included below, may be seen in an online map.

There are 20 properties and districts listed on the National Register in the county. A supplementary list includes two additional sites that were formerly on the National Register.

This National Park Service list is complete through NPS recent listings posted September 19, 2025.

== History ==
Rock County's National Register properties reflect its role as an agricultural region, served by a few population centers connected to eastern markets by railroads. The first and largest community, Luverne, was established in 1867 and platted in 1872, a later start to settlement than most other parts of Minnesota. Rail lines were constructed in the 1870s and 80s, directly influencing the placement of most of the rest of Rock County's towns.

The construction methods of Rock County's listings reveal the changing availability and fashion of building materials. The oldest structures were of wood framing. Increased investment is indicated by the use of brick, in such structures as the 1879 Pierce J. Kniss House and 1880 farmhouse at the Jacob Nuffer Farmstead. Then, from the 1890s to 1905, locally quarried Sioux Quartzite became briefly fashionable, but its extreme hardness soon quashed its appeal among builders.

== Current listings ==
	Name on the Register	Image	Date listed	Location	City or town	Description
1	Blue Mounds State Park WPA/Rustic Style Historic Resources	Blue Mounds State Park WPA/Rustic Style Historic Resources	October 25, 1989 (#89001657)	Off U.S. Route 75 north of Luverne; 43°43′02″N 96°11′21″W	Luverne	Park facilities with five contributing properties built 1937–42, significant as examples of New Deal federal work relief, regional recreational development, and National Park Service rustic design using Sioux Quartzite.
2	Bridge No. 1482	Bridge No. 1482	June 25, 1992 (#92000775)	Off U.S. Route 75 south of Luverne, Schoneman Park; 43°37′30″N 96°12′42″W	Luverne	Rare Minnesota example of the early and uncommon king post style of steel truss bridge, built in 1908 by the Hewett Bridge Company. Nominated after being moved in 1990 from its original location on the Rock River.
3	Bridge No. L-2162	Bridge No. L-2162	November 6, 1989 (#89001839)	County Road 51 over Split Rock Creek; 43°46′46″N 96°25′56″W	Jasper	Circa-1907 example of an early rural reinforced-concrete arch bridge, of a distinctive vernacular design by prolific local bridge builder Perley N. Gillham. Further notable as Minnesota's longest reinforced concrete bridge built during the first decade of their use.
4	Bridge No. L-2315		November 6, 1989 (#89001841)	Township Road 89 over the Rock River; 43°33′21″N 96°09′11″W	Luverne	Circa-1901 example of an early rural reinforced-concrete arch bridge, of a distinctive vernacular design by prolific local bridge builder Perley N. Gillham.
5	Bridge No. L-2316		November 6, 1989 (#89001843)	Township Road 89 over the Rock River; 43°33′31″N 96°09′11″W	Luverne	Circa-1906 example of an early rural reinforced-concrete arch bridge, of a distinctive vernacular design by prolific local bridge builder Perley N. Gillham.
6	Bridge No. L-4646	Bridge No. L-4646	November 6, 1989 (#89001844)	6th St. over Spring Brook; 43°36′55″N 96°21′35″W	Beaver Creek	1911 example of an early rural reinforced-concrete arch bridge, of a distinctive vernacular design by prolific local bridge builder Perley N. Gillham.
7	First National Bank of Beaver Creek	First National Bank of Beaver Creek	March 18, 1980 (#80002148)	304 E. 1st Ave. 43°36′50″N 96°21′50″W	Beaver Creek	1917 Classical Revival building with an unusually well-executed design for a small town bank. Also representative of local commercial developments.
8	J.W. Gerber House	J.W. Gerber House	March 18, 1980 (#80002151)	324 W. Main St. 43°39′17″N 96°12′52″W	Luverne	1901 Colonial Revival house of a successful local businessman and civic leader. Also noted as one of Rock County's finest examples of residential architecture.
9	R.B. Hinkly House	R.B. Hinkly House	June 10, 1975 (#75001027)	217 N. Freeman Ave. 43°39′22″N 96°12′36″W	Luverne	1892 Queen Anne-styled house notable for its fine Sioux Quartzite construction and prescient incorporation of electrical, plumbing, and telephone amenities. Now a house museum.
10	Holy Trinity Church-Episcopal	Holy Trinity Church-Episcopal	March 18, 1980 (#80002152)	220 N. Cedar St. 43°39′22″N 96°12′27″W	Luverne	1891 Gothic Revival church, a center of religious life in early Luverne that is also noted for its fine Sioux Quartzite construction.
11	Jasper Stone Company and Quarry	Jasper Stone Company and Quarry	January 5, 1978 (#78001562)	309 S. Sherman Ave. 43°50′47″N 96°23′33″W	Jasper	Quarry established c. 1890, an early regional source of Sioux Quartzite for construction, and since World War I a leading international producer of silicon dioxide for industrial abrasives.
12	Kenneth School	Kenneth School	March 18, 1980 (#80002150)	230 W. 1st Ave. 43°45′15″N 96°04′28″W	Kenneth	Only remaining example of Rock County's few two-story schools, built in 1901 very soon after Kenneth was founded. No longer extant.
13	Pierce J. Kniss House	Pierce J. Kniss House	March 18, 1980 (#80002153)	209 N. Estey St. 43°39′21″N 96°12′43″W	Luverne	Exemplary Italian Villa style house built 1878–79 by notable local architect George Soutar and builder Joseph H. Jones, owned successively by Luverne co-founder and entrepreneur P.J. Kniss and judge P.E. Brown.
14	Luverne Carnegie Library	Luverne Carnegie Library	March 18, 1980 (#80002154)	205 N. Freeman Ave. 43°39′20″N 96°12′36″W	Luverne	1904 Carnegie library noted for its role in local education. Now the Carnegie Cultural Center.
15	Frederick and Maryanna Manfred House	Frederick and Maryanna Manfred House	June 3, 2022 (#100007790)	1341 141st St. in Blue Mounds State Park; 43°41′30″N 96°11′45″W	Luverne	1961 house of author Frederick Manfred (1912–1994). Also noted for its exceptional organic architecture, blended into a rocky hill.
16	Maplewood Chapel	Maplewood Chapel	March 18, 1980 (#80002155)	1042 W. Warren St. 43°39′15″N 96°13′53″W	Luverne	Rare example of a cemetery chapel in southwestern Minnesota, built in Gothic Revival style in 1895.
17	Jacob Nuffer Farmstead	Jacob Nuffer Farmstead	March 18, 1980 (#80002149)	County Roads 53 and 57; 43°33′33″N 96°18′53″W	Hills	Century Farm representing local settlement and agriculture, with five contributing properties built 1880s–1900, including an 1890 farmhouse additionally notable for its fine and locally unusual brick construction.
18	Omaha Depot	Omaha Depot	March 18, 1980 (#80002156)	106 E. Fletcher St. 43°39′06″N 96°12′33″W	Luverne	1913 railway station symbolizing the importance of railroads in Rock County's development.
19	Palace Theater	Palace Theater	March 18, 1980 (#80002157)	104 E. Main St. 43°39′15″N 96°12′34″W	Luverne	1915 movie theater significant for its elaborate Art Nouveau interior.
20	Rock County Courthouse and Jail	Rock County Courthouse and Jail	April 18, 1977 (#77000769)	204 E. Brown St. 43°39′24″N 96°12′25″W	Luverne	Richardsonian Romanesque government buildings constructed 1887–1890, one of Minnesota's few remaining courthouse and jail complexes.

== Former listings ==
	Name on the Register	Image	Date listed	Date removed	Location	City or town	Description
1	Close Brothers Land Company Tenant House		March 18, 1980 (#80002147)	May 7, 1990	Co. Hwy. 5	Beaver Creek	1883 house representative of the hundreds of farmsteads developed and sold by a major southwest Minnesota land speculator along railroad land grants. Demolished in 1989 after being damaged by fire.
2	Worthington and Sioux Falls Freight Depot	Worthington and Sioux Falls Freight Depot	March 18, 1980 (#80002158)	April 26, 1993	106 E Fletcher St	Luverne	Rock County's first railway station, built in 1876. Demolished in 1992.

== See also ==
- List of National Historic Landmarks in Minnesota
- National Register of Historic Places listings in Minnesota
