= KJAM =

KJAM may refer to:

- KJAM (AM), a radio station (1390 AM) licensed to serve Madison, South Dakota, United States
- KMZM, a radio station (103.1 FM) licensed to serve Madison, South Dakota, which held the call sign KJAM-FM from 1959 to 2026
- KJTJ-LP, a low-power radio station (107.5 FM) licensed to serve Sidney, Nebraska, United States, which held the call sign KJAM-LP from 2014 to 2015
