= KDWC =

Radio station in Luverne, Minnesota

- Luverne, Minnesota; United States
- Broadcast area: Luverne–Rock Rapids
- Frequency: 800 kHz

Programming
- Format: Contemporary Christian
- Affiliations: ABC News Radio; Westwood One

Ownership
- Owner: Christensen Broadcasting LUV LLC
- Sister stations: KCLP; KISD; KJOE; KLOH

History
- First air date: March 1, 1971 (as KQAD)
- Former call signs: KQAD (1971–2026)

Technical information
- Licensing authority: FCC
- Facility ID: 39259
- Class: D
- Power: 500 watts day; 80 watts night
- Transmitter coordinates: 43°39′0.9″N 96°10′20.1″W
- Repeater: 106.1 KJOE-HD3 (Slayton)

Links
- Public license information: Public file; LMS
- Webcast: Listen live
- Website: christensenbroadcastnetwork.com/stations/kdwc-radio/

KDWC (800 AM) is a radio station broadcasting a contemporary Christian format. Licensed to Luverne, Minnesota, United States, the station serves the Luverne and Rock Rapids areas. The station is owned by Christensen Broadcasting LUV LLC.

== History ==
In the late 1960s well-known local newspaperman, Al McIntosh, became aware of an application pending at the Federal Communications Commission (FCC) to locate an AM radio station in Luverne. This application was initiated by the owner of a radio station in York, Nebraska, so McIntosh convinced four other local businessmen, Mort Skewes, Warren Schoon, Rollie Swanson, and Dominic Lippi, to join forces and submit a competing application to the FCC. These two applications were mutually exclusive, and sat in the hands of the FCC for upwards of two years before local stakeholders accelerated the process. In the spring of 1968, Paul Hedberg, an experienced owner of another radio station in southern Minnesota, joined the five businessmen from Luverne, and together they entered negotiations with their competitor to withdraw his application with the FCC. Soon thereafter the FCC granted the six-member ownership group, now organized as Siouxland Broadcasting, the construction permit for KQAD. At its inception KQAD broadcast a pop music format, and was affiliated with the ABC Radio Network.

Six months after the debut of KQAD, its sister station KQAD-FM went on the air. KQAD-FM became known as KLQL.

In March 2026, KQAD changed its format from classic hits to contemporary Christian under new KDWC call letters.
