= KZTP =

Radio station in Sibley, Iowa–Worthington, Minnesota

Coordinates: 43°32′30″N 95°45′05″W

- Sibley, Iowa; United States
- Broadcast area: Worthington, Minnesota
- Frequency: 104.3 MHz
- Branding: La Voz 104.3

Programming
- Language: Spanish
- Format: Full service

Ownership
- Owner: Radio Works, LLC; (Absolute Communications, LLC)
- Sister stations: KITN, KUSQ, KWOA

History
- First air date: 2008 (as KIMZ)
- Former call signs: KIMZ (2008–2009); KUSQ (2009–2012)
- Call sign meaning: K Z The Party (former branding)

Technical information
- Licensing authority: FCC
- Facility ID: 164085
- Class: A
- ERP: 3,400 watts
- HAAT: 134 meters

Links
- Public license information: Public file; LMS
- Webcast: Listen Live
- Website: KZTP Online

KZTP (104.3 FM, "La Voz 104.3") is a radio station in Worthington, Minnesota (licensed to Sibley, Iowa). Owned by Radio Works, LLC through licensee Absolute Communications, LLC, it broadcasts a full service Spanish format.

== History ==
The station first signed on the air in 2008 with a regional Mexican format under the KIMZ call letters. It flipped to a country format as "US 104" with the KUSQ call letters in 2009, which competed against Luverne-based KLQL. After the station's parent company, Absolute Communications, purchased Three Eagles Communications stations in Worthington, the KUSQ format and call letters were moved to the 100,000 watt 95.1 FM signal.

On January 5, 2012, KUSQ changed their format to Top 40/CHR, branded as 104.3 The Party with the KZTP call letters. Before the flip to CHR, the only other station with the format in the area was Marshall-based KKCK. While KKCK utilized a full 100,000 watts with a large coverage area, the tower is nearly 60 miles away, which makes it harder to receive than the local stations on portable radios. Sioux Falls-based KKLS-FM can be heard in areas west of Worthington. Most of the station's programming came from Dial Global's "Hits Now!" network.

On March 28, 2021, at 12:01 a.m., KZTP flipped to Contemporary Christian music as 104.3 The Bridge; the station will carry a mix of CCM, worship music, Christian rock and hip-hop. The station will maintain its local sports coverage.

On July 29, 2024, KZTP changed their format from contemporary Christian to full service Spanish, branded as "La Voz 104.3".
