= KITN (FM) =

- Worthington, Minnesota; United States
- Frequency: 93.5 MHz
- Branding: 93.5 Rewind FM

Programming
- Format: Classic hits

Ownership
- Owner: Radio Works, LLC; (Absolute Communications II, L.L.C.)
- Sister stations: KUSQ, KWOA, KZTP

History
- First air date: November 21, 1994
- Former call signs: KLFN (1994, CP)

Technical information
- Licensing authority: FCC
- Facility ID: 30878
- Class: C2
- ERP: 50,000 watts
- HAAT: 142 meters (466 ft)
- Transmitter coordinates: 43.5252°N 95.4133°W

Links
- Public license information: Public file; LMS
- Webcast: Listen live
- Website: myradioworks.net/rock-it-93-5

KITN (93.5 FM) is a radio station licensed to Worthington, Minnesota and serving Nobles County, southwestern Minnesota, and parts of northwestern Iowa. The station is owned by Radio Works, LLC, and broadcasts a classic hits format branded as "93.5 Rewind FM."

== History ==
KITN launched on November 21, 1994, and carried a country music format until 2002, when it flipped to classic hits as "93.5 The Eagle". Three Eagles Communications, which had recently purchased KITN, KWOA and KWOA-FM (now KUSQ), also owned Luverne based KLQL "K101", which also carried a country format. In 2007, the classic rock format of "The Eagle" was moved to 95.1 FM, and the adult contemporary format moved was moved 93.5 FM as "93.5 The Breeze". In 2012, Absolute Communications, which already owned 104.3 FM, purchased Three Eagles' Worthington stations. The country format on 104.3 FM was moved to 95.1 FM along with the KUSQ call letters. 93.5 FM flipped to a mainstream rock format as "Rock-It 93.5" and 104.3 FM flipped to a Top 40 (CHR) format as "104.3 The Party". KITN would drop mainstream rock for a classic hits format, branded as "Rewind FM," on January 1, 2023.
