= KITN =

KITN may refer to:

- KITN (FM), a radio station licensed to Worthington, Minnesota, United States
- WFTC, a television licensed to Minneapolis–Saint Paul, Minnesota, United States, which carried the KITN callsign from 1984 to 1994
- "Killing in the Name", a song by American rock band Rage Against The Machine
- Knights in the Nightmare, a strategy role-playing game
