= KCLP (FM) =

Radio station in Luverne, Minnesota

- Luverne, Minnesota; United States
- Broadcast area: Luverne–Rock Rapids–Worthington–Marshall–Sioux Falls
- Frequency: 101.1 MHz
- Branding: The Rock Farm

Programming
- Format: Mainstream rock
- Affiliations: ABC News Radio

Ownership
- Owner: Christensen Broadcasting LUV LLC
- Sister stations: KDWC; KISD; KJOE; KLOH

History
- First air date: September 1, 1971 (as KQAD-FM at 100.9)
- Former call signs: KQAD-FM (1971–1983); KLQL (1983–2026)
- Former frequencies: 100.9 MHz (1971–1983)

Technical information
- Licensing authority: FCC
- Facility ID: 39260
- Class: C1
- ERP: 100,000 watts
- HAAT: 162 meters (531 ft)
- Transmitter coordinates: 43°48′23.8″N 96°12′24.1″W
- Repeater: 106.1 KJOE-HD2 (Slayton)

Links
- Public license information: Public file; LMS
- Webcast: Listen live

KCLP (101.1 MHz, "The Rock Farm") is an FM radio station broadcasting a mainstream rock format, serving Luverne, Rock Rapids, and Worthington, with rimshot coverage in the Sioux Falls area. The station is owned by Christensen Broadcasting LUV LLC.

== History ==
The station was initially licensed to the six founders of Luverne's AM radio station, KQAD, as its FM sibling. KQAD-FM first broadcast at 100.9 MHz and with a power of 6,000 watts. In 1982, KQAD-FM's ownership group (Paul Hedberg, Al McIntosh, Mort Skewes, Warren Schoon, Rollie Swanson, and Dominic Lippi) learned that they could substantially increase the station's power and range with a slight move up the dial from 100.9 to 101.1 MHz. In his autobiography Paul Hedberg explains the reasoning behind this change: "since FM was surging in popularity we decided to go ahead with this upgrade. We submitted the application for a construction permit to effect the change, and it was granted in late 1982. A new 500-foot tower was built north of Luverne, just west of the community of Hardwick. A 12-bay antenna with a 20 kW Gates transmitter delivered our new 100,000-watt signal, and this more than doubled KQAD-FM's coverage. With this new power and frequency we decided to separate the stations’ programming. We switched our FM to a country and western format, and changed the call letters to KLQL-FM. We wanted to emphasize our new format with a cowboy boot in the logo: KLQL was going to be K101."

On March 16, 2026, KLQL changed its format from country to mainstream rock, branded as "The Rock Farm" under new KCLP call letters.
