= Hinkly House Museum =

House museum in Luverne, Minnesota

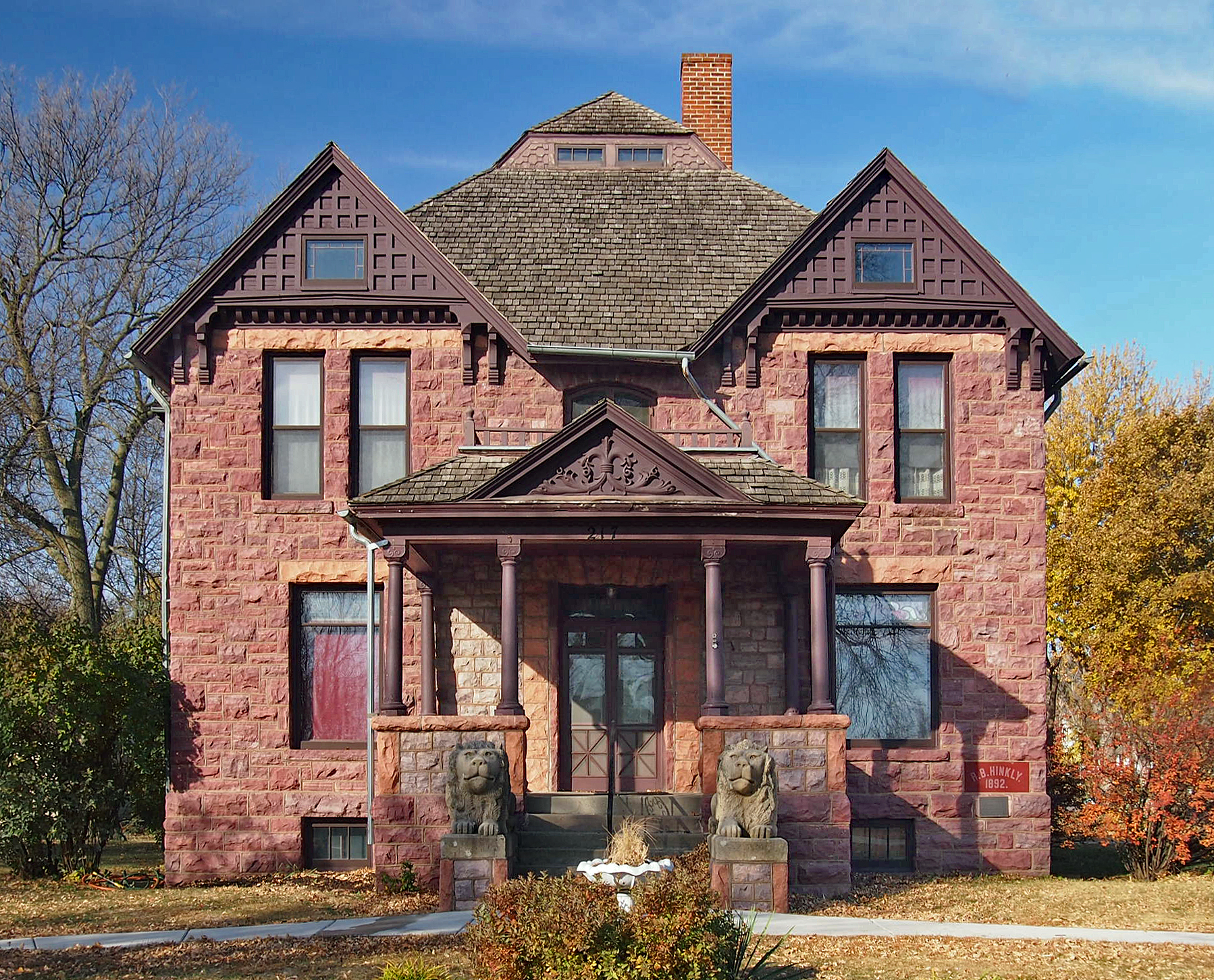
- Exterior of the museum
- Established: 1959
- Location: 217 N Freeman Ave, Luverne, Minnesota 56156
- Coordinates: 43.655994°N 96.209961°W
- Type: Local history
- Executive director: Wendel Buys
- Website: Hinkly House Museum

- R.B. Hinkly House
- U.S. National Register of Historic Places
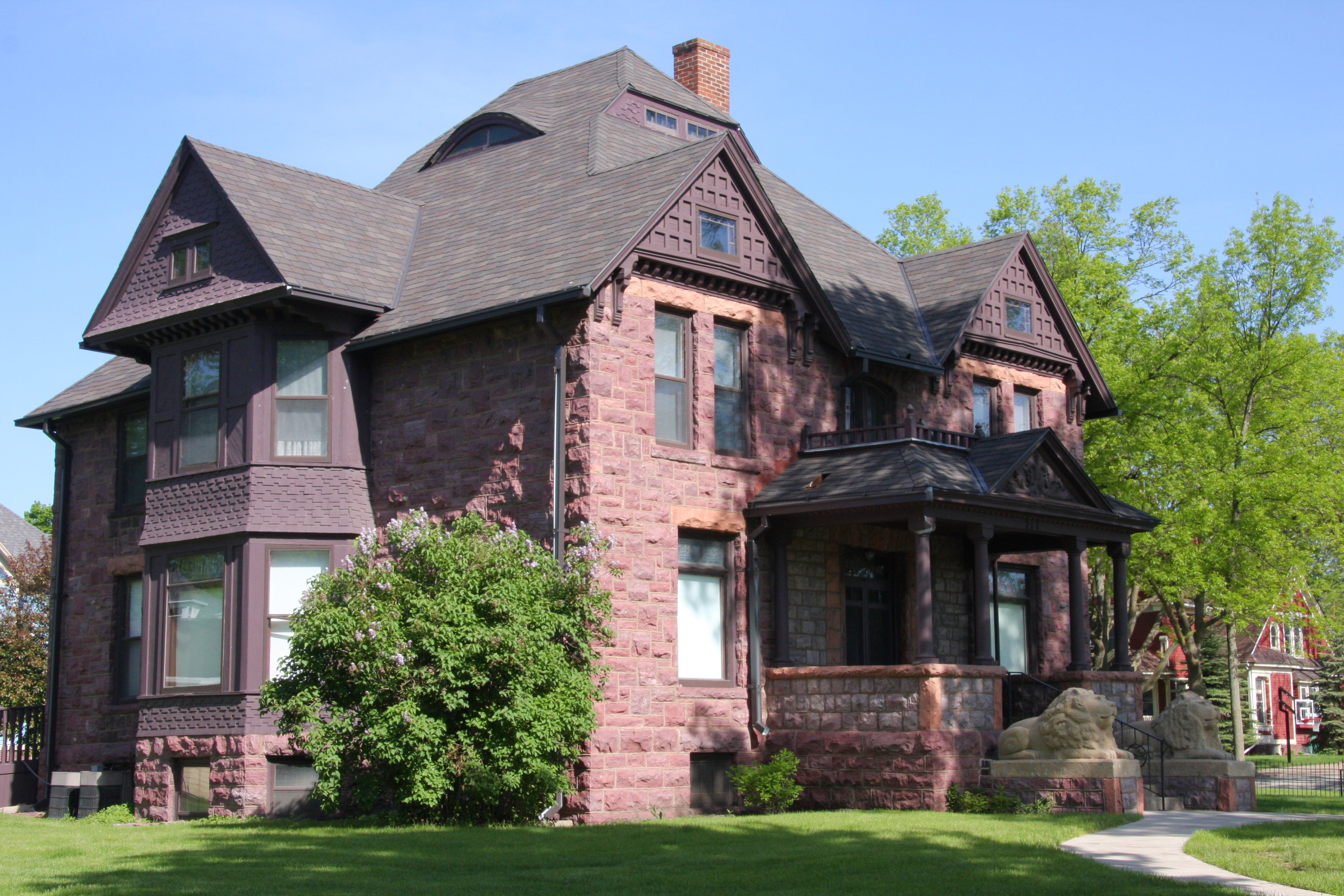

- Location within Minnesota Location within the United States
- Location: 217 N Freeman Ave, Luverne, Minnesota 56156
- Area: Less than one acre
- Built: 1892
- NRHP reference No.: 75001027
- Added to NRHP: June 10, 1975

The Hinkly House Museum is a restored Victorian mansion located in Luverne, Rock County, Minnesota owned and operated by the Rock County Historical Society. The house was listed on the National Register of Historic Places in 1975.

== History ==
Built in 1892 by (Ray Benjamin) R.B. Hinkly, a prominent local businessman and one of Luverne's founders, the house is executed with Queen Anne design features. The house is constructed from Sioux Quartzite mined from Hinkly's own quarry (now part of Blue Mounds State Park). At the time it was built, it was thought to be the "most handsome house" in all of southern Minnesota.

Donated to the Rock County Historical Society in 1959, the Hinkly House Museum features twelve rooms, two bathrooms, and a spacious attic, all restored to reflect the style of the late 1800s. Visitors can tour the house and period furnishings, wallpapers recreated to match the originals, and ceilings that echo the designs of the era.

A unique feature of the Hinkly House is the basement tunnel connecting to a hidden dynamite storage room in the backyard, a reminder of Hinkly's involvement in quarrying. The careful restoration throughout the house offers a glimpse into the lives of a wealthy family in late 19th-century Minnesota.

=== R.B. Hinkly ===
Hinkly's career spanned law, media, and finance. Before banking, he practiced law and edited a newspaper in Claremont, Iowa. He then played a key role in establishing financial institutions across Minnesota and South Dakota. He founded the Luverne Brick and Tile Company, Luverne's largest industry. In addition, he owned several thousand acres of land in Rock County and Texas.

== Operations ==
The heirs of the R. B. Hinkly family presented the house to the Rock County Historical Society in 1959. Today the Rock County Historical Society owns and manages the day-to-day operations of house museum. The museum is open for public tours seasonally from June to August and also anytime by appointment. The house also occasionally hosts exhibits such as a replica of President Abraham Lincoln's coffin in the house's parlor room.

== See also ==
- National Register of Historic Places listings in Rock County, Minnesota
- List of museums in Minnesota
