= KUSQ =

Coordinates: 43.542°N 95.752°W

- Worthington, Minnesota; United States
- Frequency: 95.1 MHz
- Branding: US 95

Programming
- Format: Country

Ownership
- Owner: Radio Works, LLC; (Absolute Communications II, LLC)
- Sister stations: KITN, KWOA, KZTP

History
- First air date: May 1961
- Former call signs: KWOA-FM (1961–2012)

Technical information
- Licensing authority: FCC
- Facility ID: 48972
- Class: C1
- ERP: 100,000 watts
- HAAT: 198 meters (650 ft)

Links
- Public license information: Public file; LMS
- Website: myradioworks.net/us-95-1

KUSQ (95.1 FM, "US 95") is a radio station broadcasting a country music format serving the Worthington, Minnesota area. The station is currently owned by Radio Works, LLC through licensee Absolute Communications II, LLC.

== History ==
The station signed on with the KWOA-FM call letters in May 1961. It was the only 100,000 watt FM station on the air between Mankato, Minnesota and Sioux City, Iowa. The station was always programmed separately from its sister AM station with the exception of some simulcast newscasts. Its format was Beautiful Music as "Stereo 95" until May 1980 when it switched to Adult Contemporary as "FM 95". The station renamed itself as "KO95" in 1985 retaining its Adult Contemporary format.

Three Eagles Communications purchased the Worthington radio station group in 1999. In 2007, the classic rock format on KITN "93.5 The Eagle" was moved to 95.1 FM as "95.1 The Eagle", and the adult contemporary format moved to 93.5 FM as "93.5 The Breeze". In 2012, Absolute Communications, which already owned 104.3 FM, purchased Three Eagles' Worthington stations. The Country format on KZTP was moved to 95.1 along with the KUSQ call letters. KITN flipped to a Rock format as "Rock-It 93.5" and 104.3 flipped to a Top 40 (CHR) format as "104.3 The Party"
