= KWOA =

Coordinates: 43°37′48″N 95°40′32″W

- Worthington, Minnesota; United States
- Frequency: 730 kHz
- Branding: The Fan 730 AM & 100.3 FM

Programming
- Format: Sports
- Affiliations: Compass Media Networks

Ownership
- Owner: Radio Works, LLC; (Absolute Communications II, LLC)
- Sister stations: KITN, KUSQ, KZTP

History
- First air date: 1947
- Call sign meaning: K Worthington On Air

Technical information
- Licensing authority: FCC
- Facility ID: 48971
- Class: D
- Power: 1,000 watts day 159 watts night
- Translator: 100.3 K262AR (Worthington)

Links
- Public license information: Public file; LMS
- Website: KWOA Online

KWOA (730 AM) is a radio station located in Worthington, Minnesota, United States, which broadcasts a sports format.

== History ==
KWOA first began broadcasting in 1947, licensed to Worthington, Minnesota. The call letters were originally established to signify "K Worthington On Air." For several decades, the station served as a "Middle-of-the-Road" (MOR) outlet before transitioning to a country music format during the 1970s. By the mid-1980s, the station shifted to a news/talk format, which it maintained until its most recent rebranding. In 2012, Absolute Communications II, L.L.C. (operating as Radio Works) acquired the station as part of a $2.2 million purchase from Three Eagles Communications. On August 14, 2017, the station flipped to its current sports format, rebranding as "The Fan 730."

April 2013, its transmitting tower was toppled by a blizzard. However, the station continued transmitting using a longwire antenna to provide storm-related information to its listeners.
