= Quentin C. Aanenson =

American fighter pilot (1921–2008)

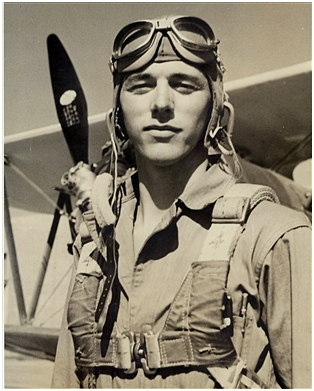
- Quentin C. Aanenson at Thunderbird Field, Phoenix, Arizona, during Primary flight training.
- Born: April 21, 1921; Luverne, Minnesota, U.S.
- Died: December 28, 2008 (aged 87); Bethesda, Maryland, U.S.
- Burial place: Arlington National Cemetery, Arlington County, Virginia, U.S.
- Spouse: Jacqueline Greer Aanenson (m. 1945)
- Children: 3
- Military career
- Allegiance: United States
- Branch: U.S. Army Air Forces
- Service years: 1942–1945
- Rank: Captain
- Units: 391st Fighter Squadron; 366th Fighter Group; 9th Air Force
- Conflicts: World War II: European campaign; Normandy landings

Quentin C. Aanenson (April 21, 1921 – December 28, 2008) was an American fighter pilot. He was a World War II veteran and former captain of the 391st Fighter Squadron, 366th Fighter Group, 9th Air Force, Army Air Forces. He flew the P-47 Thunderbolt in the Normandy D-Day invasion and subsequent European campaign.

== Life ==
Originally from Luverne, Minnesota, Aanenson enlisted in the U.S. Army Air Forces in 1942 but was not called up to active duty until February 1943. He left for Santa Ana Air Force Base for pre-flight training and then to Primary Flight School at Thunderbird Field near Phoenix, Arizona. In September 1943, he attended Basic Flight School at Gardner Field near Bakersfield, California. Aanenson then received Advanced Flight Training at Luke Field, Phoenix, Arizona, where he was commissioned a second lieutenant on January 7, 1944. From January to May 1944, he trained at Harding Field in Baton Rouge, Louisiana, where he met his wife, Jacqueline "Jackie" Greer Aanenson.

Aanenson demonstrated exceptional courage and ability as a fighter pilot, amassing tens of kills and beating all odds to survive the early months of his tour of duty. Later in the war, he was taken out of the cockpit and embedded with advance troops, with his skills put to good use as a quick-response aircraft attack coordinator. He eventually documented his experiences for his family. This was later turned into a documentary video, A Fighter Pilot's Story, which Aanenson wrote, produced and narrated. The film was first televised on November 12, 1993, then broadcast on over 300 public television stations in June 1994. The documentary reported a remarkable coincidence, in which Aanenson's P-47 was called down to assist some American troops under attack by a tank. He surveyed the scene, then reported to the troops that the tank was too close to them for him to fire upon it without risking injury to the Americans. However, since the soldiers were sure to be killed if the tank wasn't stopped, Aanenson decided to attack, and he managed to destroy the tank cleanly. About two years after the war, Aanenson met a new neighbor who started to recount the story. About halfway through, Aanenson finished the memorable event for him, and for a time they both shared in the emotion of the event.

Aanenson was a Commander of the French Legion of Honor, representing all Americans who served in France. He was also featured in the documentary The War by Ken Burns, recounting his experiences during World War II as a fighter pilot. At the conclusion of Episode Five of the series, Aanenson narrated a poignant and ominous letter he had written to his future wife but had never sent, considered by some critics to be of similar style to the Sullivan Ballou letter in Burns' The Civil War. Written December 5, 1944, the letter reads:

Dear Jackie,

For the past two hours, I've been sitting here alone in my tent, trying to figure out just what I should do and what I should say in this letter in response to your letters and some questions you have asked. I have purposely not told you much about my world over here, because I thought it might upset you. Perhaps that has been a mistake, so let me correct that right now. I still doubt if you will be able to comprehend it. I don’t think anyone can who has not been through it.

I live in a world of death. I have watched my friends die in a variety of violent ways...

Sometimes it's just an engine failure on takeoff resulting in a violent explosion. There's not enough left to bury. Other times, it's the deadly flak that tears into a plane. If the pilot is lucky, the flak kills him. But usually he isn't, and he burns to death as his plane spins in. Fire is the worst. In early September one of my good friends crashed on the edge of our field. As he was pulled from the burning plane, the skin came off his arms. His face was almost burned away. He was still conscious and trying to talk. You can't imagine the horror.

So far, I have done my duty in this war. I have never aborted a mission or failed to dive on a target no matter how intense the flak. I have lived for my dreams for the future. But like everything else around me, my dreams are dying, too. In spite of everything, I may live through this war and return to Baton Rouge. But I am not the same person you said goodbye to on May 3. No one can go through this and not change. We are all casualties. In the meantime, we just go on. Some way, somehow, this will all have an ending. Whatever it is, I am ready for it.

Quentin

== Later years ==
Following the war, Quentin and Jackie married and had three children and eight grandchildren. He worked in the insurance field after graduating from Louisiana State University.

Aanenson died from cancer at his home in Bethesda, Maryland, on December 28, 2008, aged 87. He was buried with full military honors at Arlington National Cemetery. Jackie died on January 11, 2018, aged 94.

== Tributes ==
The painting Thunderbolt Patriot by William R. Farrell, now in the permanent collection of the Smithsonian Institution's National Air and Space Museum, depicts Aanenson having just returned from a combat mission over Germany during World War II.

The airfield at Luverne Municipal Airport (KLYV) was named Quentin Aanenson Field in his honor.

== Sources ==
- Official website of Quentin C. Aanenson DVD still available as of Jan 2016.
- Obituary, startribune.com, December 30, 2008. Accessed April 20, 2024.
- Drury University: A Fighter Pilot's Story
- Biography
