= Luverne Senior High School =

Coordinates: 43°39′42″N 96°12′52″W

Luverne High School

Location
- 709 N Kniss; Luverne, Minnesota 56156; United States

Information
- Type: Public
- Established: 1878
- Principal: Ryan Johnson
- Staff: 23.79 (FTE)
- Enrollment: 378 (2022-23)
- Student to teacher ratio: 15.89
- Mascot: Cardinals
- Colors: Red and White
- Website: www.isd2184.net

Luverne Senior High School is a high school located in Luverne, Minnesota, United States. Luverne High School is the only public high school in Luverne.
