= Palace Theater (Luverne, Minnesota) =

1910s era Movie Theater

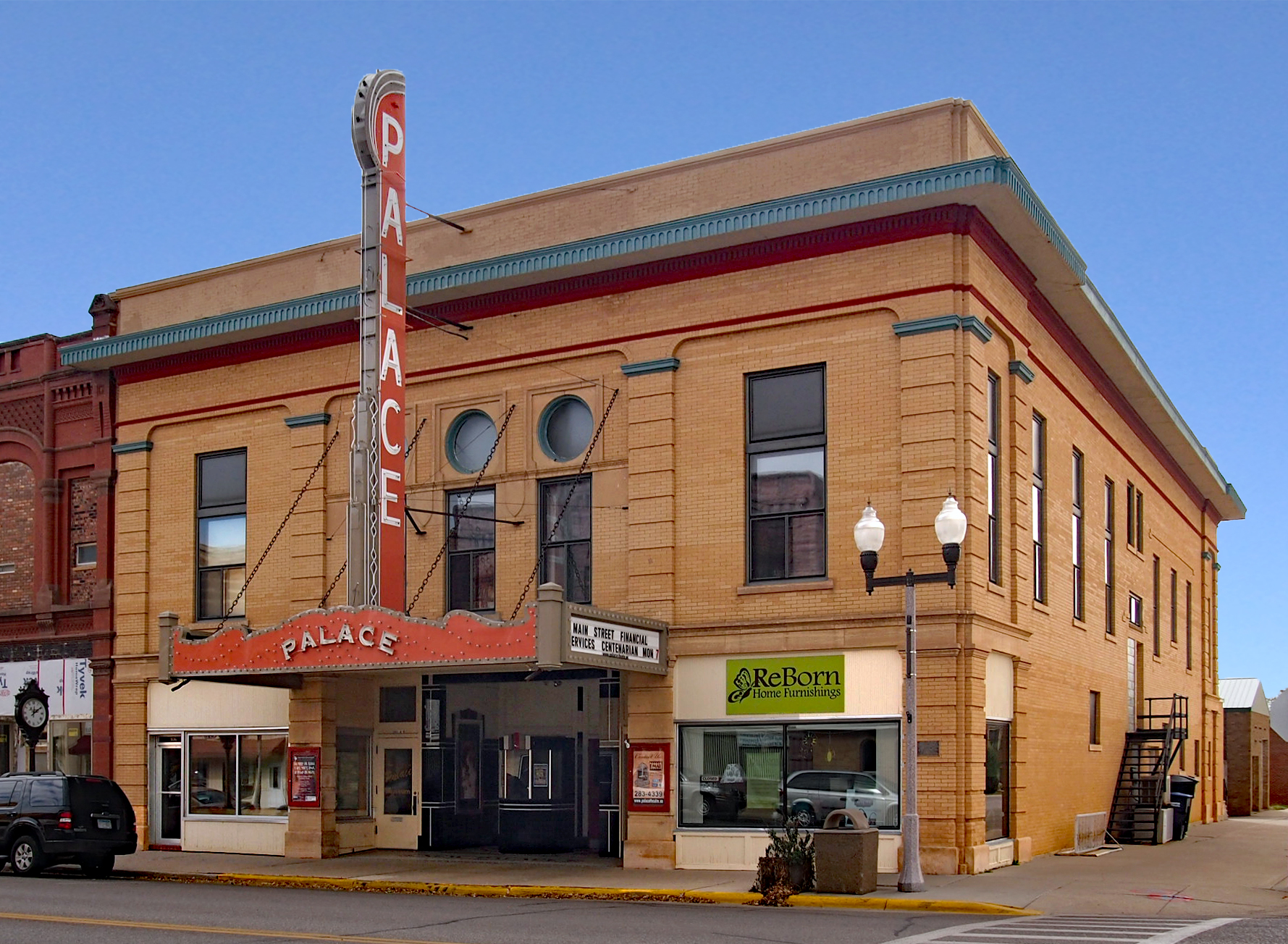
- Interactive map of Palace Theater
- Address: 104 Main Street; Luverne, Minnesota; United States
- Coordinates: 43°39′15.7″N 96°12′34.51″W
- Owner: City of Luverne
- Type: Performing arts center
- Designation: Listed on the NRHP in Rock County, Minnesota

Construction
- Opened: 1915
- Architect: W.E.E. Greene

Website
- www.palacetheatre.us

The Palace Theater is a historic theater and performing arts center in Luverne, Minnesota. Located downtown, it is owned by the city of Luverne and operated by the Blue Mound Area Theatre Board of Directors. The theater offers live events, movies, concerts, live theater, seminars, and performances by the Green Earth Players.

The 550-seat theater was built in 1915, as a venue for silent films, and live theater. It was constructed in 1915 by architect W.E.E. Greene for owners Herman and Maude Jochims. Much of the theater remains original, including the painted wall panels, stage curtains, and the stylistic wall and ceiling decor.

The Palace has its original theatre organ, made by the Geneva Organ Company. The organ was installed in 1926 to provide accompanying music for the silent movies. The organ has recently been restored, and is one of only a few theater organs that remain where first installed. In addition, it is the oldest working theater organ of its make and model in the United States.

The second story of the building was designed and used as a ballroom. It was later turned into an apartment for the Jochims. It now houses many pictures and pieces of furniture from the original Palace Theater.

The Palace Theatre was placed on the National Register of Historic Places on November 19, 1978.
