= Luverne Municipal Airport =

Airport in Minnesota, United States

Luverne Municipal Airport Quentin Aanenson Field
- IATA: none; ICAO: KLYV; FAA LID: LYV

Summary
- Airport type: Public
- Owner: City of Luverne
- Serves: Luverne, Minnesota
- Elevation AMSL: 1,435 ft (437 m)
- Coordinates: 43°37′00″N 096°13′04″W

Map
- Location of airport in Minnesota/United States LYV (the United States)

Runways
Direction	Length		Surface
Direction	ft	m	Surface
18/36	4,200	1,280	Asphalt

Statistics (2010)
- Aircraft operations: 8,400
- Based aircraft: 16
- Sources: Minnesota DOT, FAA.

Luverne Municipal Airport (ICAO: KLYV, FAA LID: LYV), also known as Quentin Aanenson Field, is a public use airport in Rock County, Minnesota, United States. It is owned by the City of Luverne and located two nautical miles (4 km) south of its central business district. This airport is included in the National Plan of Integrated Airport Systems for 2011–2015, which categorized it as a general aviation facility.

Although many U.S. airports use the same three-letter location identifier for the FAA and IATA, this airport is assigned LYV by the FAA but has no designation from the IATA.

== Facilities and aircraft ==
Quentin Aanenson Field covers an area of 85 acres (34 ha) at an elevation of 1,435 feet (437 m) above mean sea level. It has one runway designated 18/36 with an asphalt surface measuring 4,200 by 75 feet (1,280 x 23 m).

For the 12-month period ending July 21, 2010, the airport had 8,400 general aviation aircraft operations, an average of 23 per day. At that time there were 16 single-engine aircraft based at this airport.

== See also ==
- List of airports in Minnesota
