= Holy Trinity Episcopal Church (Luverne, Minnesota) =

Historic church in Minnesota, United States

- Holy Trinity Church--Episcopal
- U.S. National Register of Historic Places
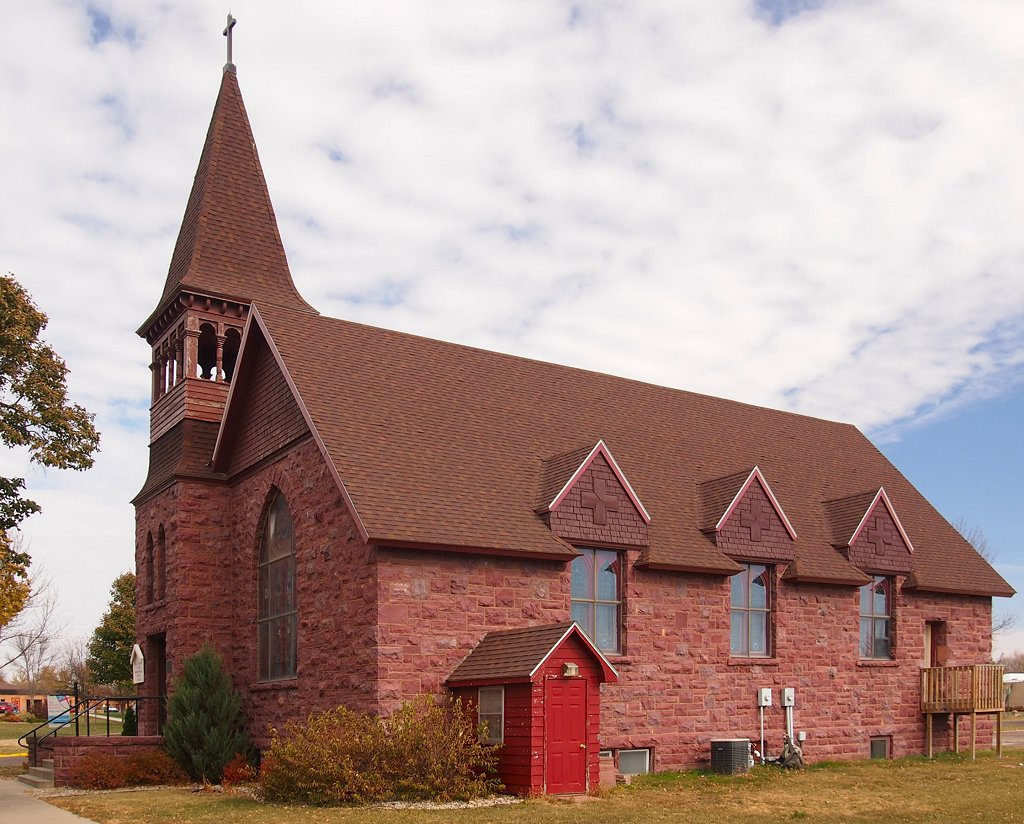
- Holy Trinity Church from the south-southwest

- Location within Minnesota Location within the United States
- Location: N. Cedar and E. Luverne Sts., Luverne, Minnesota
- Coordinates: 43°39′20″N 96°12′40″W
- Area: less than one acre
- Built: 1891
- Architect: W.E.E. Greene
- MPS: Rock County MRA
- NRHP reference No.: 80002152
- Added to NRHP: March 18, 1980

Holy Trinity Church-Episcopal is a historic Gothic Revival stone church at North Cedar and East Luverne Streets in Luverne, Minnesota, United States.

Its first rector, the Rev. C.S. Ware, and Bishop Mahlon Norris Gilbert set its cornerstone on August 19, 1891. The church was completed late that same year, costing $6,000. It was built with Sioux Quartzite from a local quarry.

The building was added to the National Register of Historic Places in 1980. It was an active parish of the Episcopal Church in Minnesota until 2016, when the church closed its doors and was offered for sale.
