= Harold Dammermann =

American businessman, farmer, and politician

Harold H. Dammermann (July 13, 1932 – August 29, 2009) was an American businessman, farmer, and politician.

Dammermann was born in Luverne, Rock County, Minnesota. He lived with his wife and family in Maynard, Chippewa County, Minnesota and was a businessman, a farmer, and the owner of Impact Plastic Company.

Dammermann served on the Maynard School Board. He also served in the Minnesota House of Representatives in 1969 and 1970.
