= W.E.E. Greene =

American architect

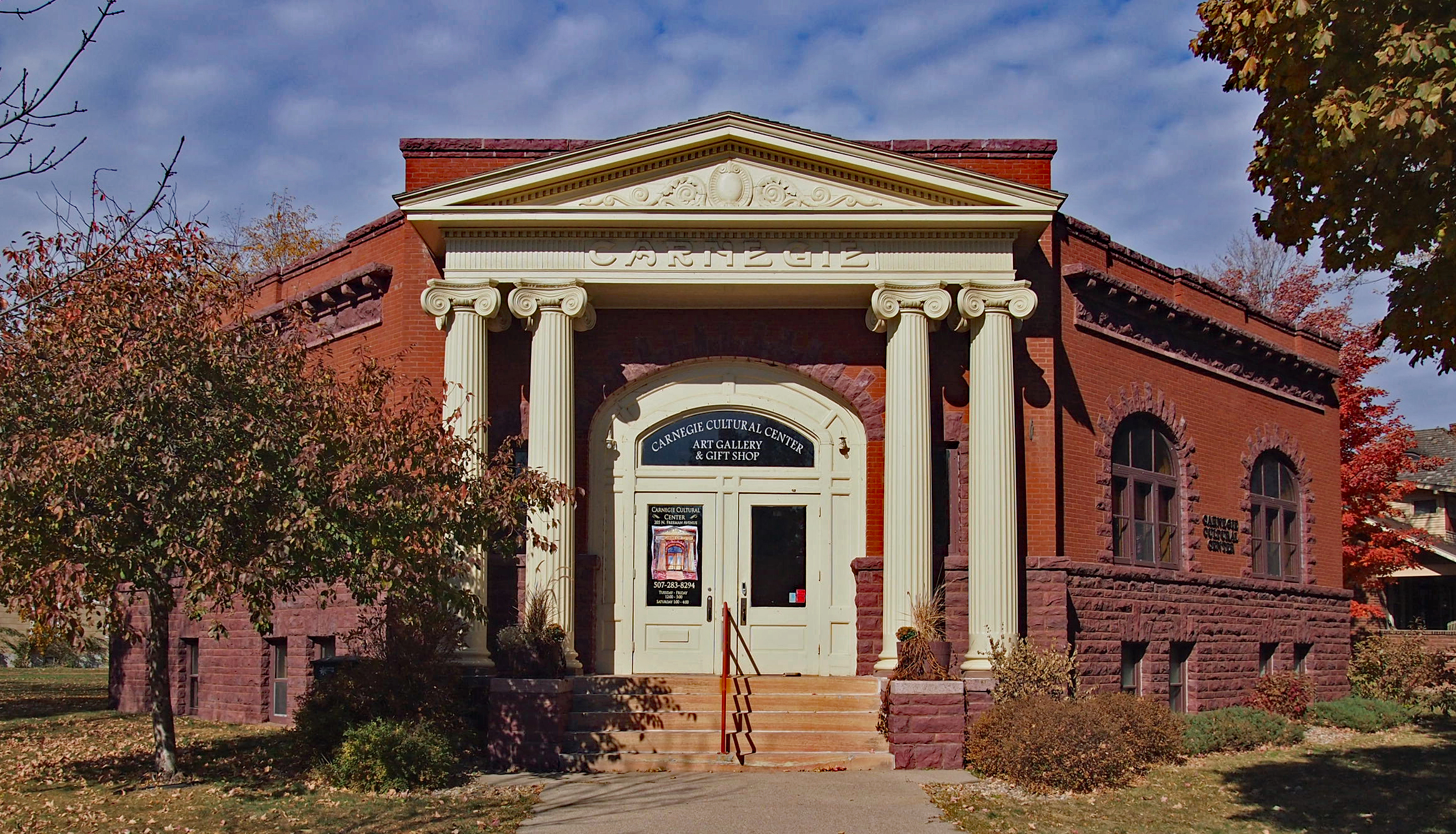
The former Luverne Carnegie Library, designed by Greene in 1904.

W.E.E. Greene was an architect and contractor who worked primarily in Luverne and Worthington in Minnesota. He was a resident of Luverne. Several of his works are listed on the U.S. National Register of Historic Places.

Works in Luverne include:

- Holy Trinity Episcopal Church, North Cedar and East Luverne Streets, NRHP-listed
- J. W. Gerber House, 324 W. Main St., NRHP-listed
- Luverne Carnegie Library, 205 N., Freeman Ave., NRHP-listed
- Maplewood Chapel, W. Warren St., NRHP-listed
- Palace Theater (Luverne, Minnesota), Main St. and Freeman Ave., NRHP-listed

Works in Worthington include:

- Hotel Thompson (Worthington, Minnesota), 300-310 10th St., NRHP-listed
