= Al McIntosh =

American journalist

Al McIntosh, Rock County Star Herald (Tollefson Publishing)

Alan Cunningham McIntosh (October 7, 1905 – July 23, 1979) was editor of the Rock County Star-Herald of Luverne, Minnesota. He was president of the Minnesota Newspaper Association in 1949. The association now recognizes individuals who have provided exceptional service to the field of journalism with its Al McIntosh Distinguished Service to Journalism Award.

Ken Burns included several World War II-era excerpts from McIntosh's weekly column in his documentary "The War," which are voiced by Tom Hanks. In an interview on the radio show Fresh Air, Burns claimed that McIntosh could have pursued a more prestigious journalistic career but chose to take the reins of a small-town newspaper. Burns also opined in the same interview that McIntosh would be the most important discovery his team made in the creation of the documentary.

McIntosh owned and published the Star-Herald from 1940 until 1968, and first became famous after writing an editorial titled “I Am a Tired American” in 1965.

== Life and career ==
McIntosh was the son of the Rev. and Mrs. Donald M. McIntosh. His family lived in Grand Forks, North Dakota, before moving to Sioux City, Iowa, where he graduated from Central High School in 1922. McIntosh then attended Morningside College in Sioux City for three years, before enrolling at the University of Nebraska where he received his degree in 1928.

He started his journalism career as editor of Nebraska Agwan, a university humor magazine, and as part-time employee at the Lincoln Star. After graduation, he established himself at the Sioux City Journal as a writer as well as businessman. When the Rock County Star was offered for sale, he bought it, assuming ownership July 1, 1940.

Two years later, the editor and publisher of the Rock County Herald, A.O. Moreaux, was killed in an auto accident. The estate offered the Herald to McIntosh, and he bought it, consolidating the two publications and changing the name to the Rock County Star-Herald.

He died in his sleep on July 23, 1979, at age 73.

== Published works ==
- McIntosh's wartime columns were published September 1, 2007, by MBI Publishing Company's Zenith Press in a book titled Selected Chaff.
- Short excerpts of his columns appear in the companion book to Burns' documentary "The War."

== Tributes ==
Ken Burns wrote:

Al McIntosh might be the single greatest archival discovery that we ever made.... He turned down big city jobs, wanting to own and run his own paper, and he had this task of explaining the unexplainable to his fellow neighbors. He did so magnificently and wrote as beautifully as any editor I’ve ever come across.

Geoffrey C. Ward wrote:

The columns [of Al McIntosh] deserve a lasting place in American cultural history.
