= KJAM (AM) =

Radio station in Madison, South Dakota

- Madison, South Dakota; United States
- Broadcast area: Eastern South Dakota
- Frequency: 1390 kHz
- Branding: Dakota's Best

Programming
- Format: Classic hits

Ownership
- Owner: Christensen Broadcast Group, Inc.
- Sister stations: KMZM

History
- First air date: 1959
- Call sign meaning: Dr. Joseph A. Muggly

Technical information
- Licensing authority: FCC
- Facility ID: 39580
- Class: D
- Power: 500 watts day; 62 watts night
- Transmitter coordinates: 44°0′36.9″N 97°10′19.2″W

Links
- Public license information: Public file; LMS
- Webcast: Listen live
- Website: www.amazingmadison.com

KJAM (1390 kHz, "Dakota's Best") is an AM radio station licensed to serve Madison, South Dakota. The station is owned by Christensen Broadcast Group, Inc. It airs a full-service classic hits music format with local news and information programming.

The call letters assigned by the Federal Communications Commission. are the initials of the original owner, Dr. John A. Muggly.
