= KMZM =

Radio station in Madison, South Dakota

- Madison, South Dakota; United States
- Frequency: 103.1 MHz
- Branding: Amazing Madison 103.1

Programming
- Format: Country

Ownership
- Owner: Christensen Broadcast Group, Inc.
- Sister stations: KJAM

History
- First air date: 1959 (as KJAM-FM)
- Former call signs: KJAM-FM (1959-2026)
- Call sign meaning: Amazing Madison

Technical information
- Licensing authority: FCC
- Facility ID: 39578
- Class: C2
- ERP: 33,000 watts
- HAAT: 93 meters (305 ft)
- Transmitter coordinates: 43°59′7.9″N 97°7′43.2″W

Links
- Public license information: Public file; LMS
- Webcast: Listen live
- Website: amazingmadison.com

KMZM (103.1 MHz, "Amazing Madison 103.1") is a full-service radio station licensed to serve Madison, South Dakota. The station is owned by Christensen Broadcast Group, Inc. It airs a country music format.

Notable on-air personalities include Peg Roehrich, Matt Groce, Stace Osthus, Maddie Osthus, and Joey D.

KMZM is also the home for area high school football and basketball broadcasts, as well as Dakota State University. During the summer, KMZM also broadcasts amateur baseball games from the Corn Belt League. KMZM's weekend programming includes local church services, as well as a country countdown show hosted by Maddie Osthus.

The station was assigned the KJAM-FM call letters by the Federal Communications Commission. In March 2026, KJAM-FM rebranded as "Amazing Madison 103.1" under new KMZM call letters.
