= Rimshot (broadcasting) =

In radio and television broadcasting a rimshot is a station that attempts to reach a larger media market from a distant suburban, exurban, or even rural location. The term is primarily used with FM stations, and mainly in North America.

The name derives not from the sound of a rimshot in music, but an analogy derived from basketball, where the rim of a basket is the furthermost portion of the goal, and a shot that rebounds against it may or may not pass through the rim and basket, like a station outside a metropolitan area's urban core.

Rimshot stations are often at a disadvantage compared to higher-strength signals in a market. Many rimshot operators attempt to serve the larger market with a signal that has deficiencies in the intended listening area, especially if its transmitter site is constrained by both topographical and regulatory constraints.

Many (if not most) rimshot stations are "move-ins", having moved to about halfway between their city of license (which they are legally required to cover and serve) and the metro area which they actually care about. In this manner, the broadcast range of the station ideally covers both. Although stations have traditionally been required to keep their main studio in their community of license, this has become less and less meaningful as more and more have been granted waivers to consolidate radio studios at a single location due to concentration of media ownership and the repeal of rules requiring a studio within 20 miles (32 km) of the station's city of license.

In the U.S., it was FCC MM docket 80-90 that allowed FM stations to have closer spacing, thereby allowing move-ins, and some new stations as well. This has generally been allowed, especially when it makes room for additional stations in outlying areas. In these cases, the table of allotments is amended in a rulemaking proceeding, although this is not always a requirement to move a station in most cases, depending on each particular situation.

On an international level, stations which attempt to serve another country are called "border blasters". These are primarily Mexican AM stations operating at very high power on clear channels to reach the American Southwest and beyond via skywave at night.

In Canada, the CRTC restricts most same-market duopolies in television to channels broadcasting in different languages. Hence, English-language duopolies in major Canadian markets have involved stations licensed to rimshot major cities or serve different portions of a larger metropolitan area (such as Victoria and Chilliwack for Vancouver, Hamilton and Barrie for Toronto, Pembroke for Ottawa and Sherbrooke for Montreal).
