= Luverne, Minnesota =

Luverne
- City
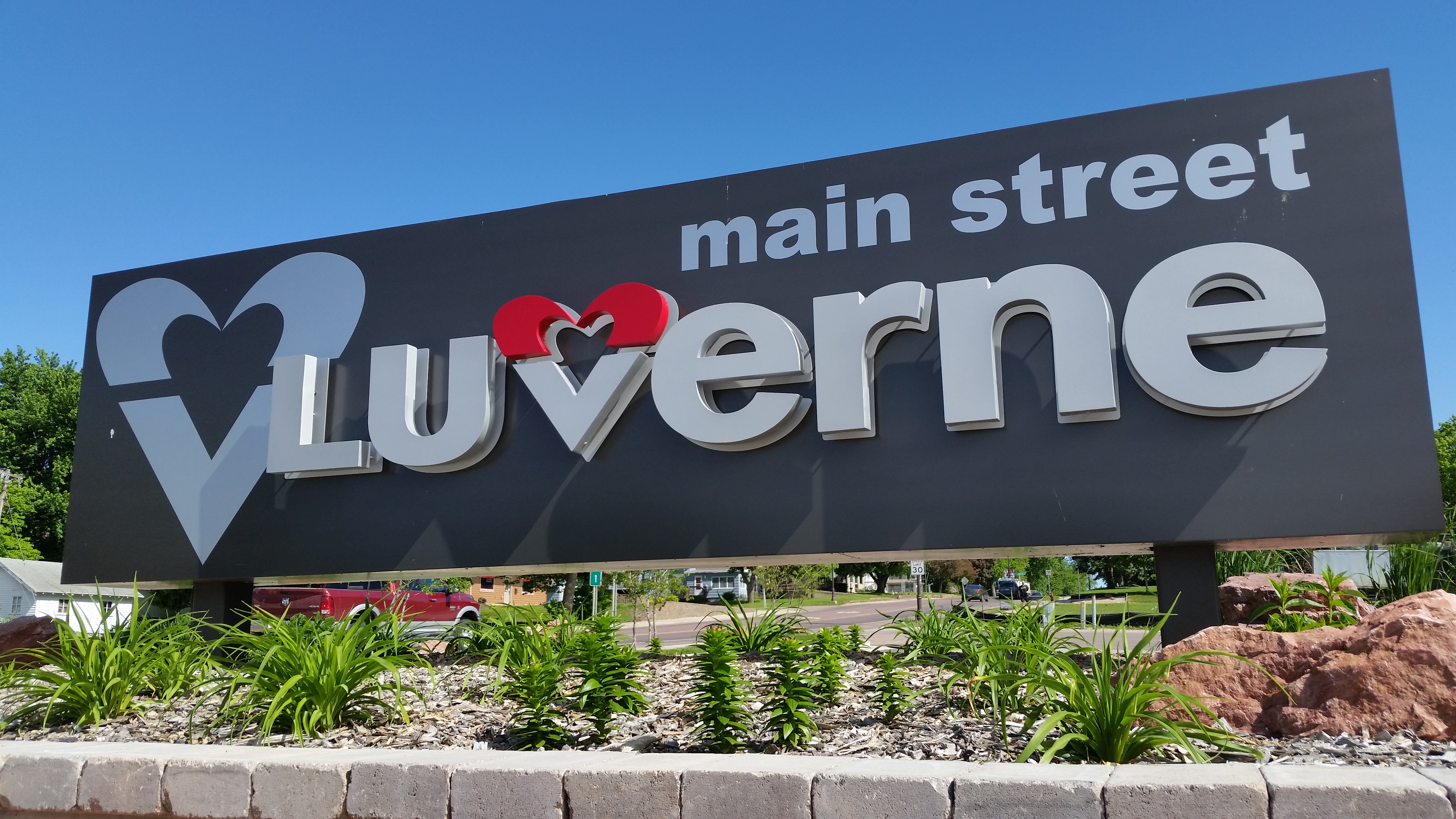
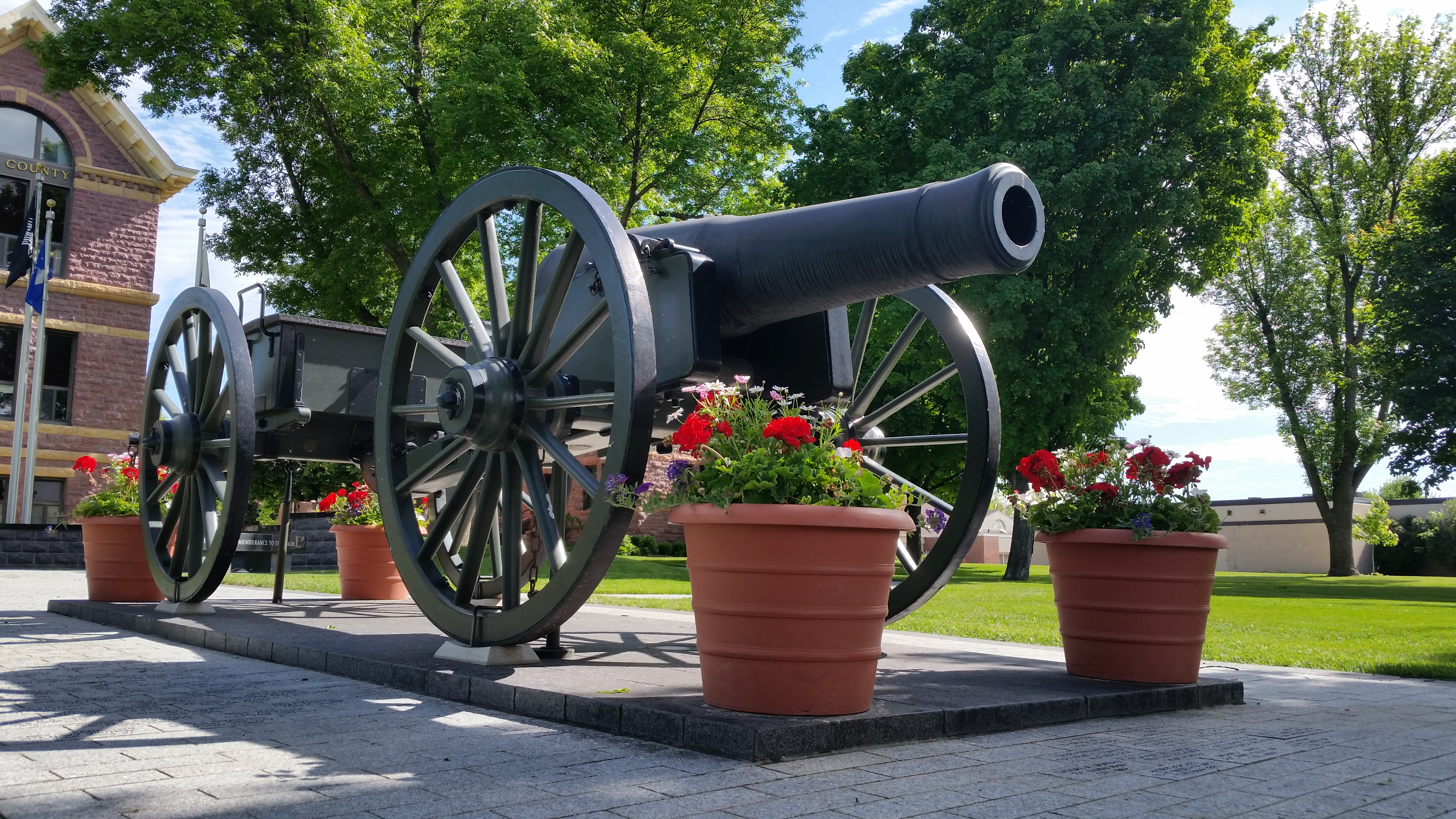
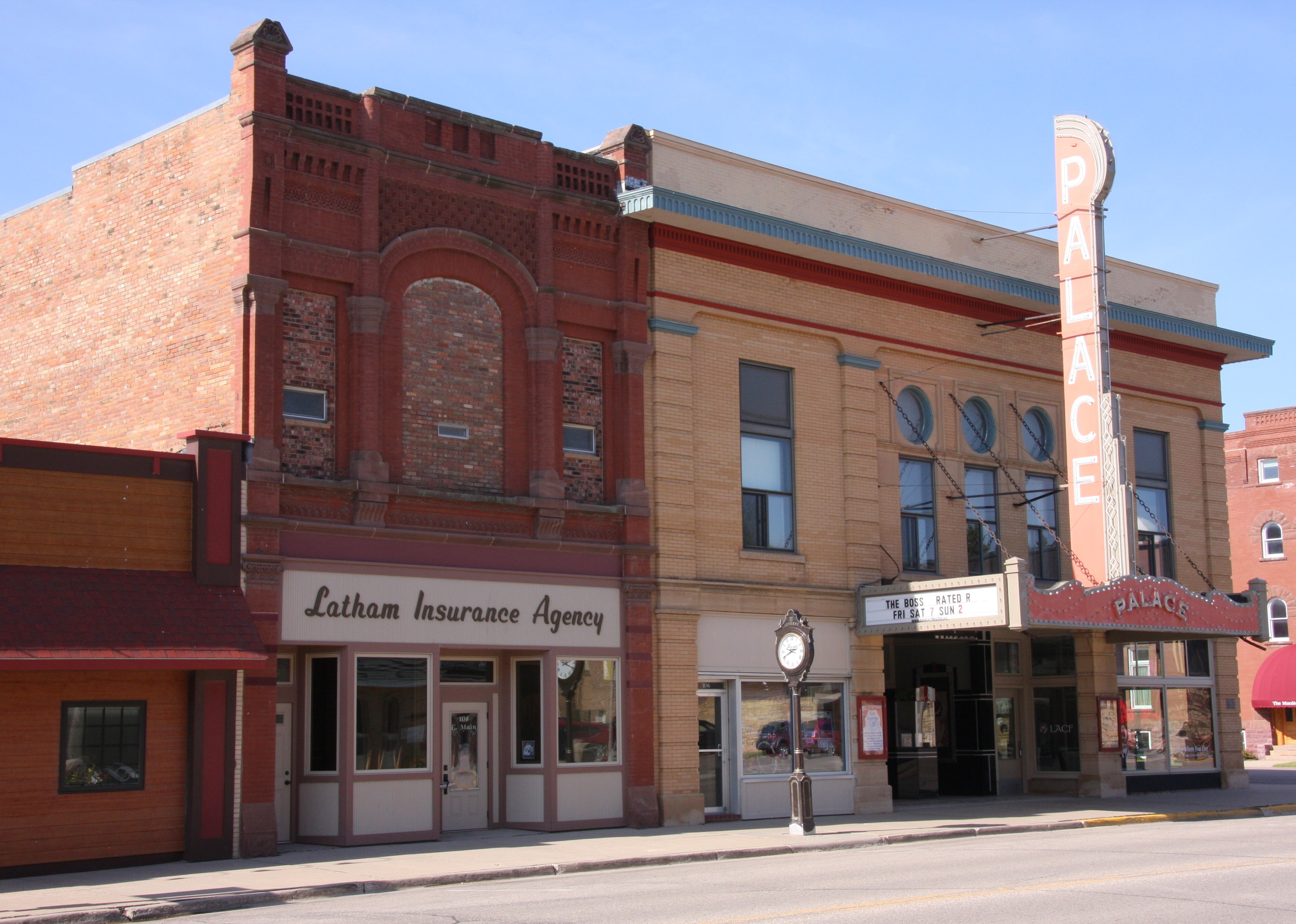
- Motto: "Love the Life!"
- Location of Luverne within Rock County and state of Minnesota
- Coordinates: 43°39′21″N 96°12′53″W
- Country: United States
- State: Minnesota
- County: Rock

Government
  - Type: Mayor–council
  - Mayor: Pat Baustian

Area
  - Total: 3.68 sq mi (9.53 km^{2})
  - Land: 3.67 sq mi (9.51 km^{2})
  - Water: 0.0077 sq mi (0.02 km^{2})
- Elevation: 1,463 ft (446 m)

Population (2020)
  - Total: 4,946
  - Density: 1,346.4/sq mi (519.86/km^{2})
- Time zone: UTC-6 (Central (CST))
  - Summer (DST): UTC-5 (CDT)
- ZIP code: 56156
- Area code: 507
- FIPS code: 27-38564
- GNIS feature ID: 2395787
- Website: City of Luverne

Luverne (/ləˈvɜːrn/ lə-VURN) is a city in and the county seat of Rock County, Minnesota, United States, along the Rock River. Its population was 4,946 as of the 2020 census. Luverne is part of the Sioux Falls metropolitan statistical area (MSA), which is home to over 300,000 people.

Luverne has been featured in numerous films and television series. It is one of four towns profiled in the 2007 Ken Burns documentary The War. It is also the main setting for the second season of the TV show Fargo.

== History ==
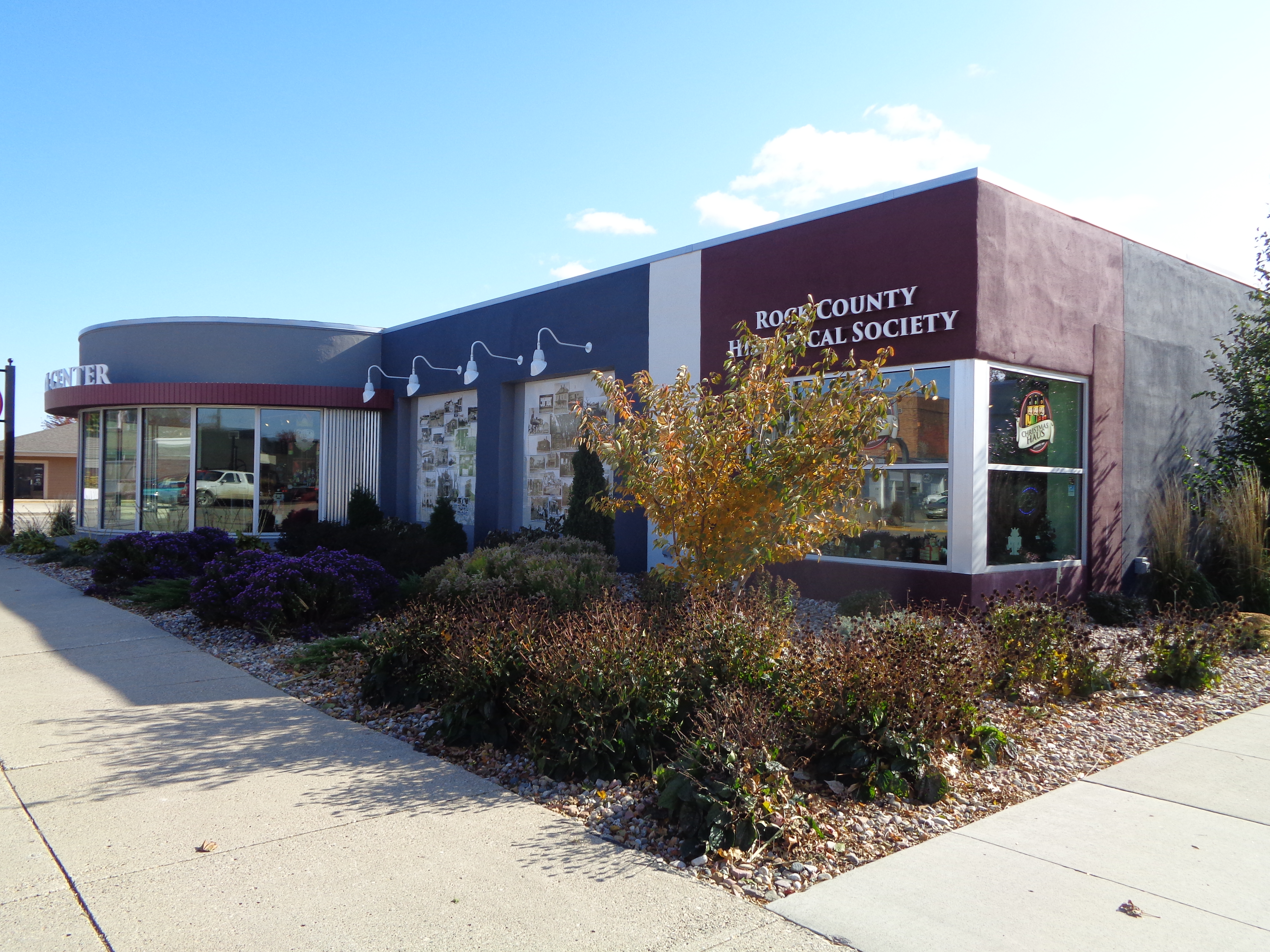
Rock County History Center

A post office called Luverne has been in operation since 1868. Luverne was platted in 1870 and named for Luverne Hawes, the daughter of a settler.

== Geography ==
According to the United States Census Bureau, the city has a total area of 3.69 square miles (9.56 km^{2}), of which 0.01 square miles (0.03 km^{2}) is covered by water. Rock County holds the distinction of being one of four counties in Minnesota without a natural lake.

== Demographics ==
Historical population
Census	Pop.	Note	%±
1880	679		—
1890	1,466		115.9%
1900	2,223		51.6%
1910	2,540		14.3%
1920	2,782		9.5%
1930	2,644		−5.0%
1940	3,114		17.8%
1950	3,650		17.2%
1960	4,249		16.4%
1970	4,703		10.7%
1980	4,568		−2.9%
1990	4,382		−4.1%
2000	4,617		5.4%
2010	4,745		2.8%
2020	4,946		4.2%
U.S. Decennial Census; 2013 Estimate

=== 2020 census ===
As of the 2020 census, Luverne had a population of 4,946. The median age was 41.2 years. 25.1% of residents were under the age of 18 and 24.2% of residents were 65 years of age or older. For every 100 females there were 91.7 males, and for every 100 females age 18 and over there were 88.2 males age 18 and over.

96.9% of residents lived in urban areas, while 3.1% lived in rural areas.

There were 2,096 households in Luverne, of which 28.2% had children under the age of 18 living in them. Of all households, 44.8% were married-couple households, 18.0% were households with a male householder and no spouse or partner present, and 32.0% were households with a female householder and no spouse or partner present. About 37.3% of all households were made up of individuals and 20.0% had someone living alone who was 65 years of age or older.

There were 2,254 housing units, of which 7.0% were vacant. The homeowner vacancy rate was 2.0% and the rental vacancy rate was 7.1%.

Racial composition as of the 2020 census
Race	Number	Percent
White	4,509	91.2%
Black or African American	37	0.7%
American Indian and Alaska Native	20	0.4%
Asian	34	0.7%
Native Hawaiian and Other Pacific Islander	4	0.1%
Some other race	85	1.7%
Two or more races	257	5.2%
Hispanic or Latino (of any race)	261	5.3%

=== 2010 census ===
As of the 2010 census. 4,745 people, 2,048 households, and 1,257 families were residing in the city. The population density was 1,289.4 inhabitants per square mile (497.8/km^{2}). The 2,237 housing units had an average density of 607.9 per square mile (234.7/km^{2}). The racial makeup of the city was 96.3% White, 0.8% African American, 0.2% Native American, 0.6% Asian, 0.4% from other races, and 1.6% from two or more races. Hispanics or Latinos of any race were 2.7% of the population.

Of the 2,048 households, 27.7% had children under 18 living with them, 49.0% were married couples living together, 9.1% had a female householder with no husband present, 3.3% had a male householder with no wife present, and 38.6% were not families. About 35.8% of all households were made up of individuals, and 19% had someone living alone who was 65 or older. The average household size was 2.23 and the average family size was 2.89.

The median age in the city was 42.1 years; 24.4% of residents were under 18; 6.4% were 18 to 24; 22% were 25 to 44; 24.3% were 45 to 64; and 23% were 65 or older. The gender makeup of the city was 46.8% male and 53.2% female.

=== 2000 census ===
As of the 2000 census, 4,617 people, 1,968 households, and 1,247 families residing in the city. The population density was 1,356.1 inhabitants per square mile (523.6/km^{2}). The 2,161 housing units had an average density of 634.7 per square mile (245.1/km^{2}). The racial makeup of the city was 97.27% White, 0.67% African American, 0.32% Native American, 0.58% Asian, 0.58% from other races, and 0.56% from two or more races. Hispanics or Latinos of any race were 1.56% of the population.

Of the 1,968 households, 26.4% had children under 18 living with them, 53.8% were married couples living together, 7.3% had a female householder with no husband present, and 36.6% were not families. Around 33.9% of all households were made up of individuals, and 21.2% had someone living alone who was 65 or older. The average household size was 2.25 and the average family size was 2.90.

In the city, the age distribution was 23.8% under 18, 6.9% from 18 to 24, 22.3% from 25 to 44, 20.6% from 45 to 64, and 26.4% who were 65 or older. The median age was 43 years. For every 100 females, there were 89.4 males. For every 100 females 18 and over, there were 83.5 males

The median income for a household in the city was $36,271 and for a family was $46,745. Males had a median income of $30,549 versus $22,660 for females. The per capita income for the city was $18,692. About 5.7% of families and 8.8% of the population were below the poverty line, including 7.1% of those under 18 and 10.0% of those 65 or over.

== Government ==
Luverne is located in Minnesota's 1st congressional district, represented by Brad Finstad, a Republican. At the state level, Luverne is located in Senate District 22, represented by Republican Bill Weber, and in House District 22A, represented by Republican Joe Schomacker.

== Education ==
The Luverne Public Schools system provides education for kindergarten through grade 12. A new elementary school addition opened on 1 December 1998. Luverne Senior High School is the system's high school.

Luverne has an active chapter of Dollars for Scholars. According to its website, Luverne Dollars for Scholars has an endowment over $9.7 million.

== Parks and recreation ==
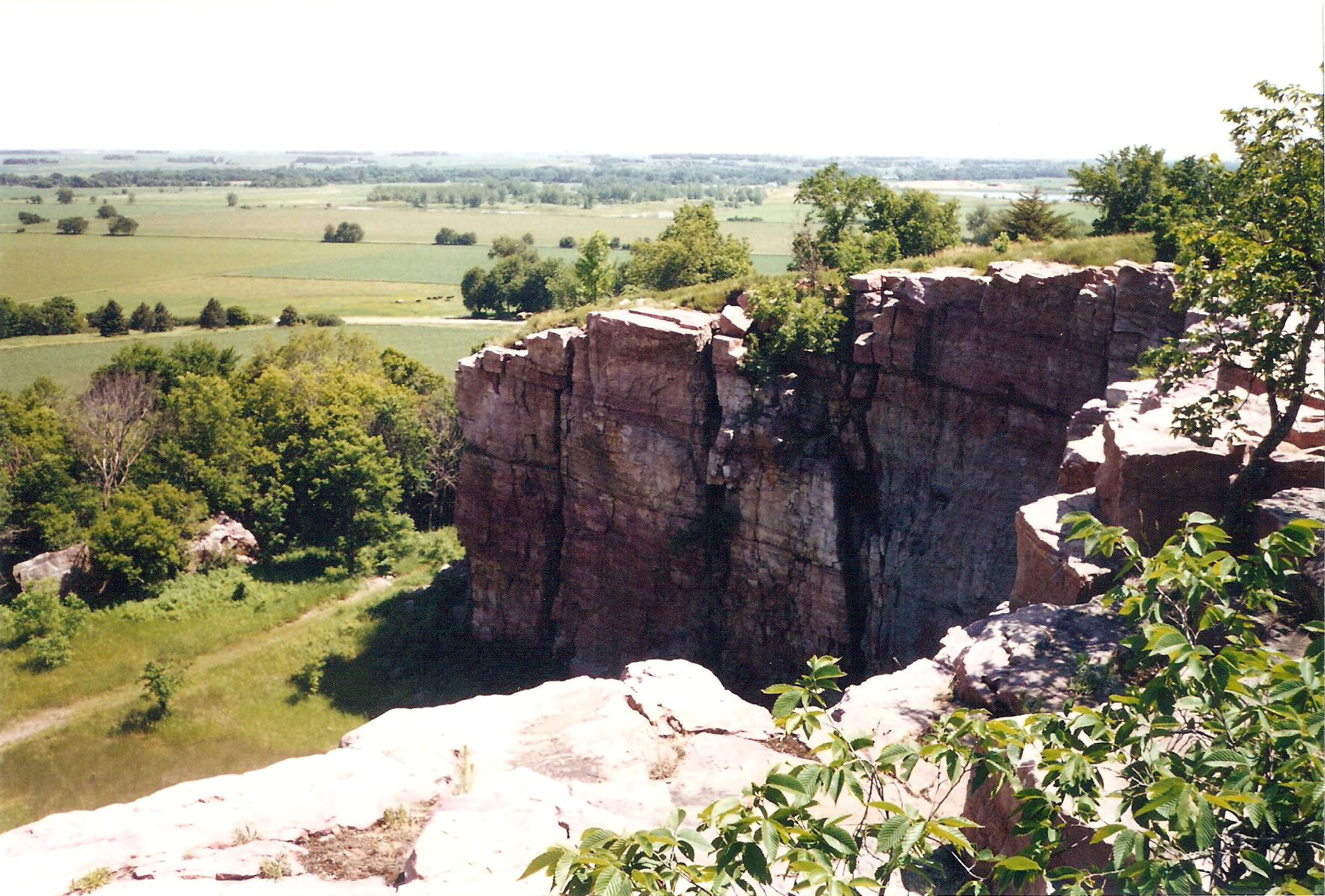
Sioux quartzite cliff at Blue Mounds State Park

The Blue Mound Biking and Hiking Trail is a six-mile (10 km) path that stretches from Main Street in downtown Luverne to the lower lake parking lot at Blue Mounds State Park. Along the path, visitors can see open scenery and agricultural fields, tree-lined shade, and a view of the Blue Mound cliff line. A portion of the trail branches off and goes to the top of the 90-foot (27 m) cliff line for a panoramic view of the community.

In addition to a large city park beside the Rock River, Luverne maintains 10 neighborhood parks.

== Arts and culture ==
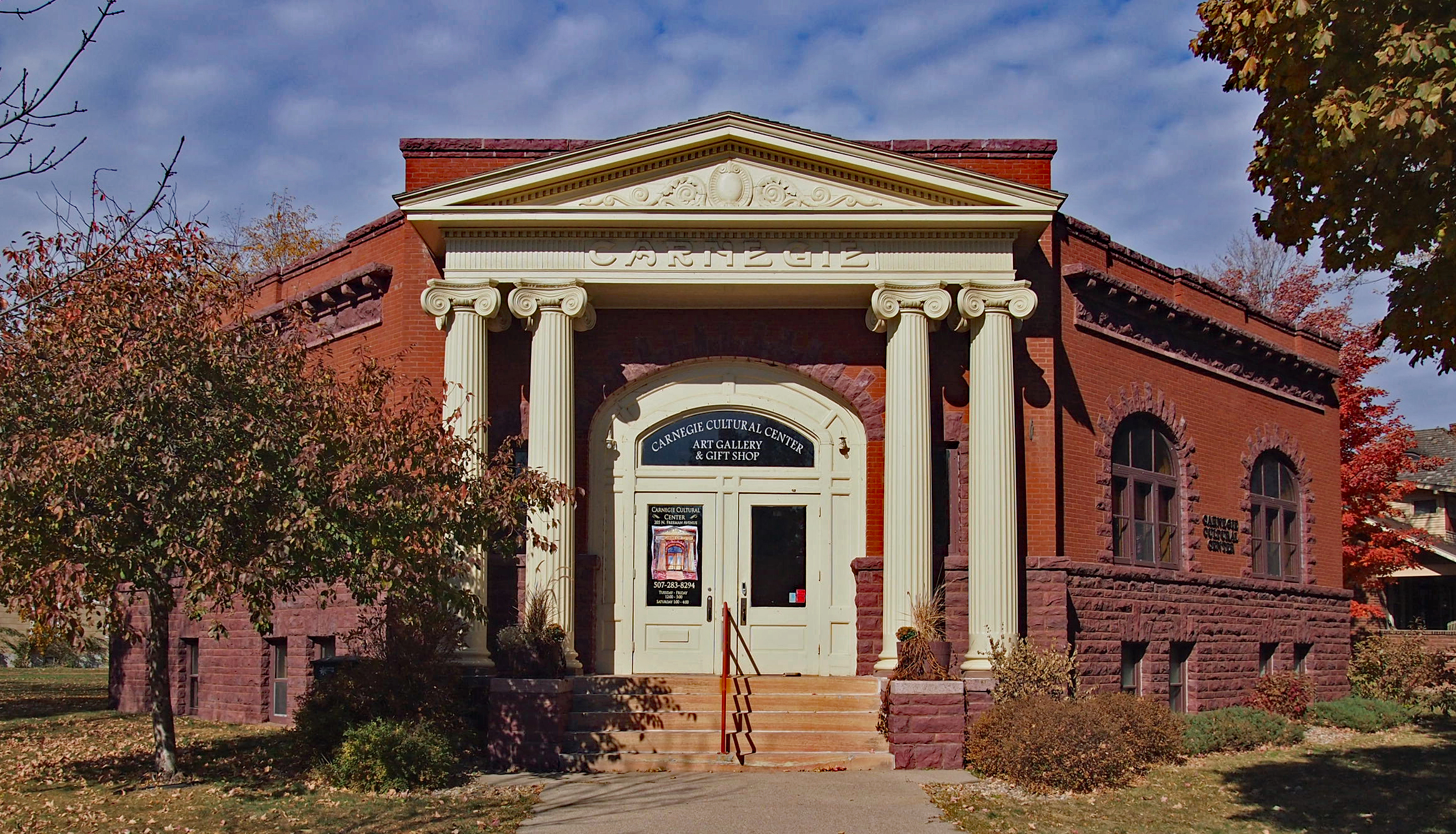
Carnegie Cultural Center (former Luverne Public Library)

- Palace Theater on Main Street underwent a $1 million renovation. Then on September 6, 2007, the theater hosted the world premiere of Ken Burns' epic 15-hour PBS documentary, The War—first aired on PBS September 23, 2007. Luverne is one of four U.S. cities that serve as anchor points for The War. The series tells the story of World War II from the perspective of "so-called ordinary Americans" who fought and lived through the global cataclysm. GOP presidential candidate and former Pennsylvania Senator Rick Santorum held a town hall meeting at the Palace Theatre January 30, 2012. The packed gathering occurred one week prior to the Minnesota precinct caucuses held to influence the selection of delegates for party nominees as part of the 2012 presidential campaign.
- Carnegie Cultural Center in Luverne, Minnesota, is a historic building originally constructed in 1902 as a Carnegie library. After the Council for Arts and Humanities of Rock County ended its lease in 2020, the city repurposed the space. Luverne Street Music, a non-profit that connects music instructors with students, now occupies the building. The Carnegie Cultural Center underwent renovations in to create soundproof music studios in the basement while preserving the open floor plan and architectural details of the main level.
- Rock County History Center showcases the history of Rock County through exhibits, artifacts, and documents. It features permanent displays such as a collection of over 5,300 nutcrackers, alongside temporary exhibits on specific historical topics. The center also houses a research area with historical documents and photographs for public exploration.
- Green Earth Players produce children's summer theater at the Palace Theater.
- Verne Drive-in Movie Theater features new films for viewing outdoors.
- Rock County Veterans Memorial, dedicated May 28, 2007, is located on the south lawn of the historic and refurbished Rock County Courthouse. Many have likened the quality of the Memorial to what would be seen in Washington, DC. The memorial was built by KA.H.R.—a family foundation. Supplementing the Memorial are individual paver stones that honor by name Rock County veterans of all services. The design allows future Rock County veterans to be added to the site. Many surviving World War II honorees were aboard an Honor Flight sent to the World War II Memorial in Washington, DC, on May 1, 2010. Minnesota Governor Tim Pawlenty and the state's First Lady took a personal interest in the Rock County group by being present at the send-off and previously hosting a group of Rock County World War II veterans at the Governor's Mansion. Among the veterans on the Honor Flight was long-serving former State Representative Wendell O. Erickson. The memorial lists 10 men as killed or missing in action in the Vietnam War, but four of those named (Boyd Beyer, Harold Keith Binford, Arlo Hemme and Dale Ruddvy) do not appear on records of those killed or missing in the war.
- Brandenburg Gallery – Photography from Luverne native and National Geographic photographer Jim Brandenburg is located on the first two floors of the Rock County Veterans Memorial Building dedicated in July 2009 on Luverne Street at Courthouse Square. Featured subjects include wildlife and the outdoors, with a focus on the vanishing prairie. Profits from the gallery support the mission of the Brandenburg Prairie Foundation.
- Herreid Military Museum and the Heritage Gallery occupy two upper floors of the Rock County Veterans Memorial Building. Dedicated in 2009, the new galleries building adjoins the new Kahler Terrace, providing an outdoor setting for community events. A tunnel connects the building to the Rock County Courthouse, itself beautifully renovated in 1987–88. Both structures were built from locally quarried Sioux quartzite. The Memorial Building's transformation from the former county jail and sheriff's residence to a museum complex was driven by the KA.H.R. Foundation of Warren Herreid II and Jeannine Rivet.

== Transportation ==
=== Roads ===
Interstate 90 and U.S. Route 75 are two of the main routes in the city. Iowa borders to the south and South Dakota to the west. The regional center of Sioux Falls, South Dakota, is a 30-minute drive on Interstate 90.

=== Air ===
Luverne is served by Quentin Aanenson Field. A lengthened runway and expanded facilities went into service in 2009. The airport is named after World War II flying ace Quentin C. Aanenson.

== Notable people ==
- Quentin C. Aanenson – World War II flying ace, born in Luverne. Aanenson completed 75 flying missions, earning numerous medals. Aanenson participated in Ken Burns' The War series. Luverne's airfield is named after him
- Jim Brandenburg – award-winning nature photographer for National Geographic and other publications, filmmaker, and environmentalist, he was twice named Magazine Photographer of the Year and in 1988 Wildlife Photographer of the Year by Great Britain's Natural History Museum and BBC Wildlife.
- Jerilyn Britz – U.S. Women's Open golf champion in 1979 and winner of the 1980 LPGA Mary Kay Classic, she finished in second place at two other major championships. She played on the LPGA tour 1974–1999; she first played golf at age 17 at Luverne Country Club course.
- Charles F. Crosby, Minnesota and Wisconsin legislator, lawyer
- Walter J. Croswell, Minnesota farmer and state legislator
- Harold H. Dammermann, Minnesota businessman, farmer, state legislator
- W.E.E. Greene, a local architect, several of whose works in Luverne are listed in the National Register of Historic Places
- Jay LaDue, Minnesota state senator and farmer
- Al McIntosh – editor and publisher of The Rock County Star Herald, president of the forerunner to the National Newspaper Association and the Minnesota Newspaper Association
- Frederick Manfred – an author, his work includes 18 novels set in the American West and Upper Midwest, often located in the Iowa-Minnesota-South Dakota tristate area he named "Siouxland".
- Monti Ossenfort – American football general manager of the NFL Arizona Cardinals (2023–present)
- Shantel VanSanten – model and actor, born in Luverne and best known for her role in the television series One Tree Hill and The Boys
- James Russell Wiggins – an executive editor of The Washington Post and ambassador to the United Nations, he began his career by publishing a Luverne newspaper and then editing the St. Paul Pioneer Press.
- Dick Wildung is a University of Minnesota two-time All-American, College Football Hall of Fame, and Green Bay Packer Hall of Fame member.
